= MRC 0051–097 =

Radio galaxy in the constellation of Cetus

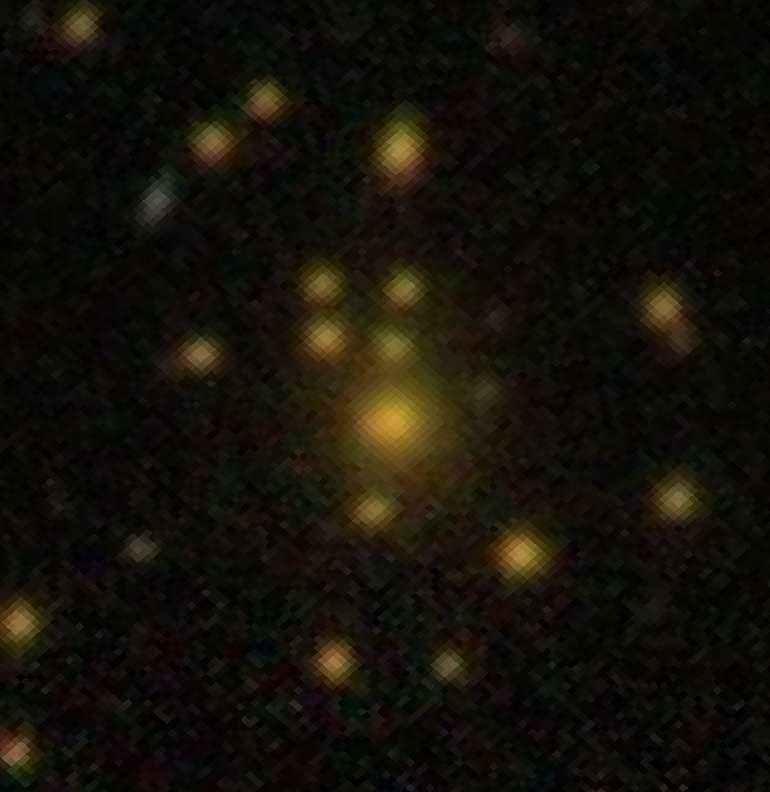
- SDSS image of MRC 0051–097

Observation data (J2000.0 epoch)
- Constellation: Cetus
- Right ascension: 00^{h} 53^{m} 54.20^{s}
- Declination: −09° 28′ 22.41″
- Redshift: 0.269904
- Heliocentric radial velocity: 80,915 ± 15 km/s
- Distance: 3,877.1 ± 271.4 Mly (1,188.71 ± 83.21 Mpc)
- Group or cluster: WHL J005354.2–092823

Characteristics
- Type: BrClG
- Size: ~875,500 ly (268.43 kpc) (estimated)

Other designations
- 2MASX J00535416–0928230, 6dF J0053542–092823, APMUKS(BJ) B005123.00–094437.8, GLEAM J005354–092824, LEDA 2822398, [LHC2018] J013.47580–09.47303, OGC 0666, NVSS J005354–092825, NYU-VAGC 0306384, PMN J0053–0928, WHL J005354.2–092823 BCG

MRC 0051–097 also known as OGC 666 and NYU-VAGC 0306384, is a radio galaxy located in the constellation of Cetus. The redshift of the galaxy is (z) 0.269 and it was first discovered by astronomers with the Molongo Radio Telescope in February 1981.

== Description ==
MRC 0051–097 is an elliptical galaxy residing as the brightest cluster galaxy of the WHL J005354.2–092823 galaxy cluster with 47 confirmed galaxy member candidates. The R-band magnitude of the galaxy is 17.03. The stellar velocity dispersion is 308 kilometers per seconds while the galaxy effective radius is 15.7 kiloparsecs. The absolute magnitude has been estimated as -23.62 whereas the physical size is 347 kiloparsecs.

The radio source of the galaxy is found mainly compact on sub-arcsecond scales with its total flux density estimated to be 0.337 mJy at 1400 MHz frequencies by NRAO VLA Sky Survey (NVSS) with a calculated solar elongation of 34.9°. The spectral index of the source is -0.83α while the scintillation index is less than 0.02.

A study has found the source is a double with a 162 MHz flux density of 1.634 mJy with a normalized scintillation index of 18.9. Radio imaging by Faint Images of the Radio Sky at Twenty-Centimeters (FIRST) detected four separate components associated with the source. Evidence found the galaxy is found powered by its active galactic nucleus (AGN) with its total log radio luminosity estimated to be 25.86 W Hz^{−1} and has a 1.4 GHz flux density of 337.4 mJy. The stellar mass of the galaxy is 11.39 M_{☉}. The K-band magnitude of the galaxy is 12.681 based on its isothopal K magnitude calculated by the 2MASS survey.
