= BZQ J1727+5510 =

BL Lacertae object in the constellation Draco

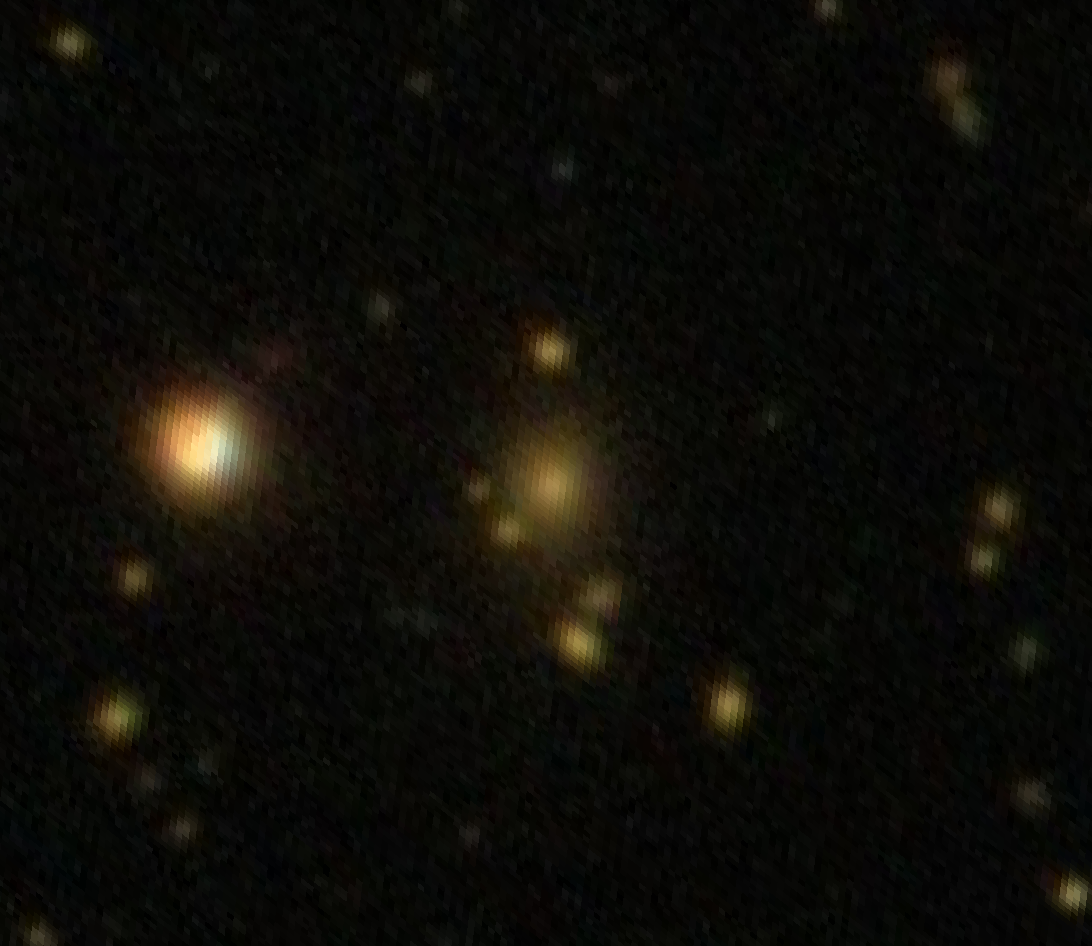
- SDSS image of BZQ J1727+5510

Observation data (J2000.0 epoch)
- Constellation: Draco
- Right ascension: 17^{h} 27^{m} 23.46^{s}
- Declination: +55° 10′ 53.53″
- Redshift: 0.247177
- Heliocentric radial velocity: 74,102 ± 4 km/s
- Distance: 3,574.2 ± 250.2 Mly (1,095.84 ± 76.71 Mpc)
- Group or cluster: Abell 2270
- magnitude (J): 15.34

Characteristics
- Type: BrClG;FSRQ Sy2?
- Size: ~405,000 ly (124.3 kpc) (estimated)

Other designations
- 2MASX J17272346+5510538, Abell 2270:[REK2022] BCG, OGC 1369, GB6 J1727+5510, CRATES J1727+5510, GMBCG J261.84782+55.18156 BCG, LEDA 2493307, NVSS J172723+551053, RX J1727.3+5510:[BEV98] 002, SDSS J172723.47+551053.5

BZQ J1727+5510 also known as OGC 1369 and GB6 J172722+551059, is a BL Lacertae object located in the constellation of Draco. The redshift of the object is (z) 0.247 and it was first discovered in the Cosmic Lens All-Sky Survey (CLASS) in October 2001, by astronomers who classified it as a radio source with a flat radio spectrum. It is the brightest cluster galaxy of the galaxy cluster Abell 2270.

== Description ==
BZQ J1727+5510 is an elliptical galaxy with an estimated R-band luminosity of 8.2 magnitude based on an R-band luminosity measurement made by the Sloan Digital Sky Survey (SDSS). It is categorized as a Type 2 active galactic nucleus (AGN) displaying emission lines of singly ionized oxygen, doubly ionized oxygen as well as both h-gamma and h-beta in its optical spectrum. The total star formation rate of the galaxy is estimated to be 93.5^{+69.4}_{−57.3} M_{☉} per year, with the galaxy having an estimated age of 7.49^{+1.77}_{−1.81} billion years. The total infrared luminosity of the galaxy is 11.97^{+0.24}_{−0.41} L_{☉}. The galaxy's stellar mass has been calculated to be 11.73 ± 0.11 M_{☉} while the central supermassive black hole has a mass of 7.12 M_{☉}. The g –r color offset of the galaxy is -0.39 magnitude.

A study in published in 2026 has reclassified BZQ J1727+5510 as a Type 1 AGN from a Type 2 AGN. It has a radio luminosity of 41.68 erg s^{−1} that is obtained from the Faint Images of the Radio Sky at Twenty-Centimeters (FIRST) survey conducted at 1.4 GHz frequencies. The galaxy also displays detected doubly ionized oxygen (O III) outflows with the O III emission lines displaying an outflow strength of 510.30 kilometers per second.

Radio imaging made by the Very Long Baseline Interferometry (VLBI) found BQZ J1727+5510 has a parsec-scale jet that is orientated at a position angle of -18° with the median distance of the jet and core components estimated to be 3.6 milliarcseconds based on a standard average deviation. The mean flux density of the galaxy is 236 mJy, with detected variability of 4.1%.
