= TXS 1040+243 =

Radio galaxy in the constellation Leo Minor

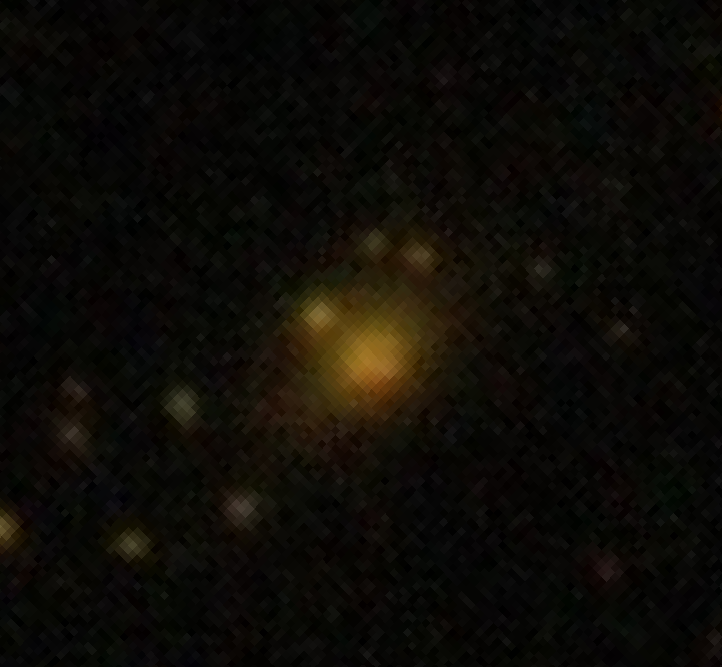
- SDSS image of TXS 1040+243

Observation data (J2000.0 epoch)
- Constellation: Leo Minor
- Right ascension: 10^{h} 43^{m} 43.32^{s}
- Declination: +24° 04′ 47.44″
- Redshift: 0.366680
- Heliocentric radial velocity: 109,928 ± 21 km/s
- Distance: 5,303.3 ± 371.2 Mly (1,626.00 ± 113.82 Mpc)
- Group or cluster: WHL J104343.3+240447
- magnitude (K): 14.90

Characteristics
- Type: BrClG
- Size: ~870,900 ly (267.03 kpc) (estimated)

Other designations
- 2MASX J10434332+2404470, 7C 1040+2420, NVSS J104343+240447, RX J1043.7+2404, TN J1043+2404, VLSS J1043.7+2404, B2 1040+24B, SDSS J104343.28+240446.7, WHL J104343.3+240447 BCG, LEDA 3759627

TXS 1040+243 also known as TN J1043+4304, is a radio galaxy located in the constellation of Leo Minor. The redshift of the galaxy is (z) 0.366 and it was first discovered as an astronomical radio source by astronomers with the Bologna Northern Cross Telescope in September 1972, where it was designated as B2 1040+24B.

== Description ==
TXS 1040+243 is an elliptical galaxy of Type E. It is also a red luminous galaxy residing as the brightest cluster galaxy of the WHL J104343.3+240447 galaxy cluster with 32 confirmed galaxy member candidates. The R-band magnitude of the galaxy is found to be 17.30 magnitude, while its absolute magnitude is -23.80.

The galaxy contains an active galactic nucleus (AGN) and is categorized as a compact radio galaxy containing a non-bent type source, with its total radio flux density calculated by the NRAO VLA Sky Survey (NVSS) estimated in units of 49.80 mJy at 1.4 GHz frequencies. The radio spectrum of the source is categorized as being ultra steep with the radio spectra index of -1.59 ± 0.07α at low frequencies, with the radio structure orientated at the position angle of 90°.

A study would find it is compact double made up of two unresolved components, with a major axis of 3.2 arcseconds. These components are estimated to have angular sizes of 3.2 and 1.3 arcseconds in total, with flux densities of 44.4 ± 1.4 mJy at 1365 MHz and 2.5 ± 0.59 mJy at 4860 MHz respectively. Evidence suggested the source has an elongated morphology that is mainly depicted by a single elliptical profile component, with evidence of a radio core detected by Faint Images of the Radio Sky at Twenty-Centimeters (FIRST). The core flux density is estimated to be 49.85 mJy while the total radio power is calculated to be 23.49 × 10^{24} WHz^{−1}.
