= SDSS J112155.27+104923.2 =

Elliptical galaxy in the constellation Leo

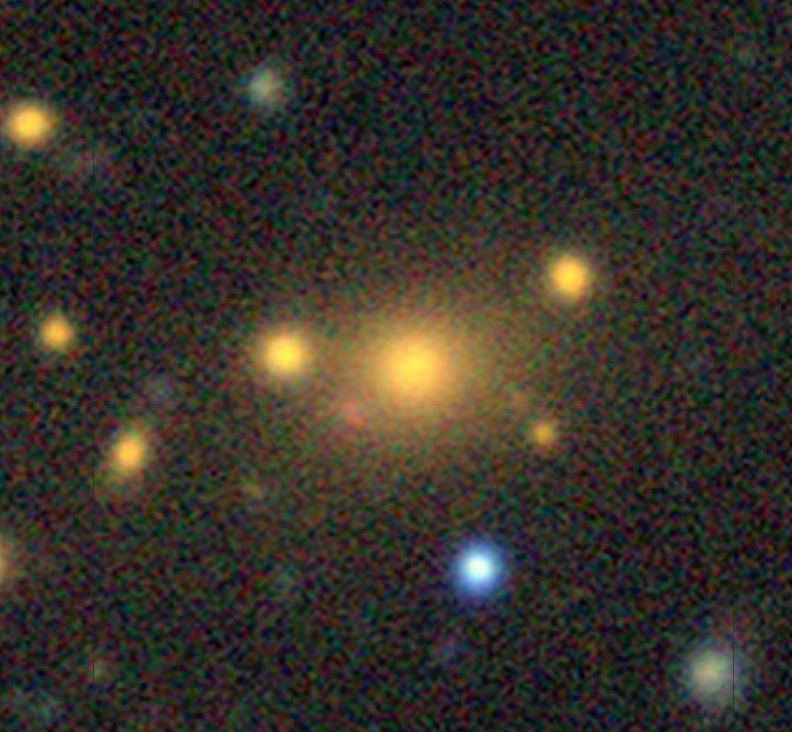
- DESI Legacy Surveys image of SDSS J112155.27+104923.2

Observation data (J2000.0 epoch)
- Constellation: Leo
- Right ascension: 11^{h} 21^{m} 55.31^{s}
- Declination: +10° 49′ 23.09″
- Redshift: 0.240504
- Heliocentric radial velocity: 72,101 ± 7 km/s
- Distance: 3,485.5 ± 244.0 Mly (1,068.65 ± 74.81 Mpc)
- Group or cluster: WHL J112155.3+104923
- magnitude (K): 14.34

Characteristics
- Type: BrClG
- Size: ~615,000 ly (188.5 kpc) (estimated)

Other designations
- 2MASX J11215527+1049232, [HWH2012] 12, LEDA 1385000, [LHC2018] J170.48035+10.82310, NVSS J112155+104927, WHL J112155.3+104923 BCG

SDSS J112155.27+104923.2 is an elliptical galaxy located in the constellation of Leo. The redshift of the galaxy is estimated to be (z) 0.240 and it was first discovered by astronomers in October 2007, from a sample of fossil groups in the Sloan Digital Sky Survey (SDSS).

== Description ==
SDSS J112155.27+104923.2 is an elliptical galaxy residing as the brightest cluster galaxy of the WHL J112155.3+104923 galaxy cluster with 23 confirmed galaxy member candidates. The R-band magnitude of the galaxy is 17.14 while the total stellar mass of the galaxy is 11.24 M_{☉}. The absolute magnitude of the galaxy is -23.84 magnitude.

It is also categorized as a fossil galaxy dominating the fossil group called FGS 12, with its total X-ray luminosity estimated to be 3.85 × 10^{43} erg/s while the velocity dispersion is 251 ± 21 kilometers per seconds. The effective surface brightness is 18.61 ± 0.34 magnitudes per square arcsecond while its effective radius is 11.1 ± 3.0 kiloparsec. The position angle of the galaxy is orientated at 100.9 ± 3.0°.

The galaxy is found to contain an active galactic nucleus. Radio imaging made with Very Large Array at 1.4 GHz, finds the radio source is mainly point-like and elongated with the total radio extent being 11.0 arcseconds and has an root mean square noise of 57 ɥJy beam^{−1}. The total radio flux density is estimated to be 4.8 mJy while the total radio luminosity is 23.90 W Hz^{−1}. A study suggested the source is mainly elongated depicted as a single elliptical component with the radio core detected by Faint Images of the Radio Sky at Twenty-Centimeters (FIRST) having a flux density of 4.19 mJy.
