= SDSS J103034.78+141541.8 =

Radio galaxy in the constellation Leo

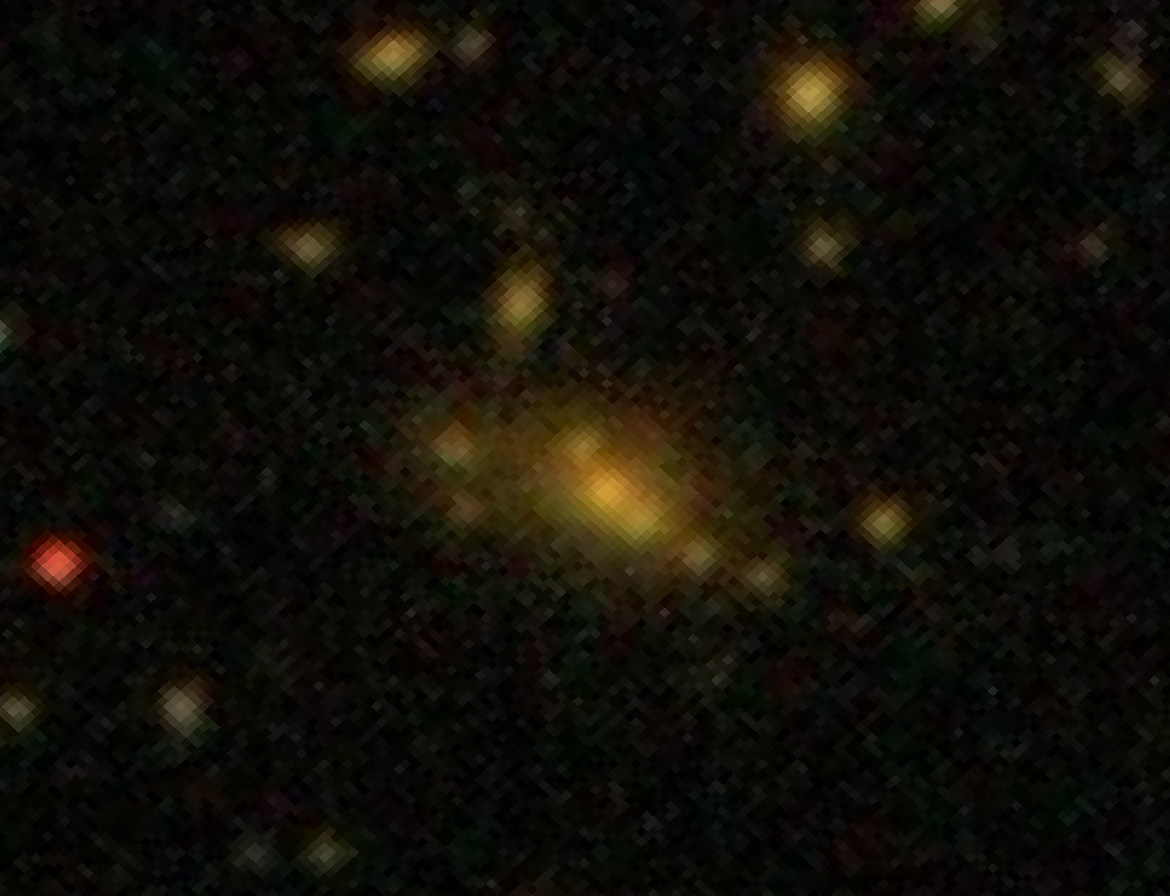
- The radio galaxy SDSS J103034.78+141541.8

Observation data (J2000.0 epoch)
- Constellation: Leo
- Right ascension: 10^{h} 30^{m} 34.74^{s}
- Declination: +14° 15′ 41.71″
- Redshift: 0.317379
- Heliocentric radial velocity: 95,148 ± 20 km/s
- Distance: 4,593.5 ± 321.6 Mly (1,408.37 ± 98.59 Mpc)
- Group or cluster: WHL J103034.8+141542
- Magnitude (J): 14.59

Characteristics
- Type: BrClG
- Size: ~950,000 ly (291.2 kpc) (estimated)

Other designations
- 2MASX J10303479+1415418, NVSS J103034+141546, LEDA 1453633, SDSS J103034.78+141541.8, WHL J103034.8+141542 BCG, [YHW2016] J157.64494+14.26161, RX J1030.5+1416

SDSS J103034.78+141541.8 also known as RX J1035.5+1416, is a radio galaxy located in the constellation of Leo. The redshift of the galaxy is (z) 0.31 and it was first discovered as a faint source from the ROSAT survey in May 2000.

== Description ==
SDSS J103034.78+141541.8 is an elliptical galaxy with an optical morphological classification of Type E. It is a luminous red galaxy residing as the brightest cluster galaxy (BCG) of the galaxy cluster, WHL J103034.8+141542 with at least 61 confirmed galaxy member candidates. The total r-band magnitude of the galaxy is estimated to be 16.65 and its r-band absolute magnitude is -24.30 magnitude.

The galaxy dominates the center of a fossil group, with its estimated half viral radius being 0.875 arcmin. It is also an X-ray source, with the source 61 arcseconds from the center. The total X-ray luminosity is 2.07E+0.44 erg s^{−1} between 0.5 to 2 keV.

The nucleus is active and it has been classified as a non-bent tailed radio galaxy containing a compact radio source, with its total flux density of 6.50 mJy obtained by the NRAO VLA Sky Survey (NVSS) at 1.4 GHz frequencies. The total radio power has been estimated to be 2.11 × 10^{24} WHz^{−1}. A radio core has been detected by the Faint Images of the Radio Sky at Twenty-Centimeters (FIRST), with the core flux density estimated as 4.72 mJy. The radio morphology of the source is blended with other sources, appearing to consist of one single blob of radio emission. The luminosity distance of the source is 1673.3 megaparsecs.
