= SDSS J110347.36+055047.5 =

Radio galaxy in the constellation of Leo

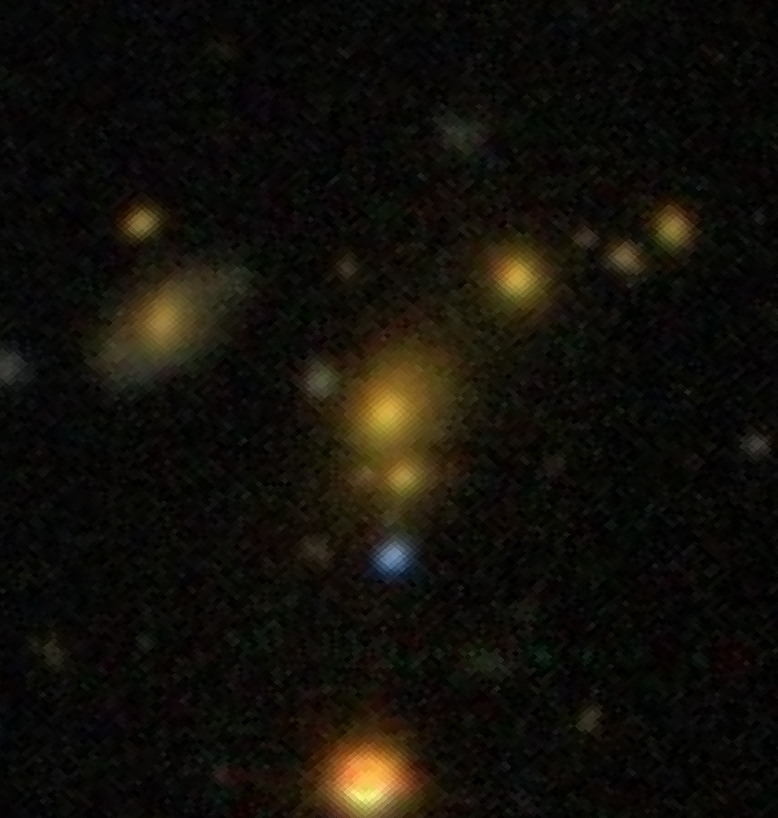
- SDSS image of SDSS J110347.36+055047.5

Observation data (J2000.0 epoch)
- Constellation: Leo
- Right ascension: 11^{h} 03^{m} 47.35^{s}
- Declination: +05° 50′ 47.50″
- Redshift: 0.244480
- Heliocentric radial velocity: 73,655 ± 31 km/s
- Distance: 3,543.2 ± 248.0 Mly (1,086.35 ± 76.05 Mpc)
- Group or cluster: WHL J110347.4+055048
- magnitude (J): 14.47
- magnitude (H): 13.71

Characteristics
- Type: BrClG
- Size: ~678,000 ly (207.9 kpc) (estimated)

Other designations
- 2MASX J11034735+0550471, ASK 232491.0, [LHC2018] J165.94736+05.84654, NVSS J110347+055048, [THW2016] J165.9472+05.8481, WHL J110347.4+055048 BCG, LEDA 3469909

SDSS J110347.36+055047.5 also known as [LHC2018] J165.94736+05.84654, is a radio galaxy located in the constellation of Leo. The redshift of the galaxy is estimated to be located at (z) 0.244.

== Description ==
SDSS J110347.36+055047.5 is an elliptical galaxy of Type E morphology, residing as the brightest cluster galaxy of the WHL J110347.4+055048 galaxy cluster belonging as part of a supercluster with 25 confirmed galaxy member candidates. The R-band magnitude of the galaxy has been found to be 16.98 while its absolute magnitude is calculated to be -23.42.

The central nucleus is found to be active and it has been categorized as a non-bend compact radio galaxy or a low-excitation radio galaxy (LERG) with its total flux density estimated as 6.60 mJy by NRAO VLA Sky Survey (NVSS). The radio morphology is mainly elongated, depicted as a single elliptical profile component although radio contour imaging made by Faint Images of the Radio Sky at Twenty-Centimeters (FIRST) suggested the radio morphology is compact and described by a single point-like component. There is also a presence of a radio core with its total core flux density of 2.04 mJy while the total radio emission flux density is 4.70 mJy. The luminosity distance of the source is 1239.6 megaparsecs. Radio imaging by NVSS also showed there is a single component with a total integrated radio flux density of 4.70 mJy. The G-band magnitude of the galaxy is 18.14 while the I-band magnitude is 16.52.

A study found the total stellar mass of the galaxy is 11.33 M_{☉}. The log radio luminosity is 23.91 W Hz-1 while the radio flux density at 1.4 GHz is 4.7 mJy. The rest-frame r^{0.1} magnitude is -22.685. Evidence found the galaxy is powered by its active galactic nucleus.
