= SDSS J102040.84+315510.0 =

Radio galaxy in the constellation Leo Minor

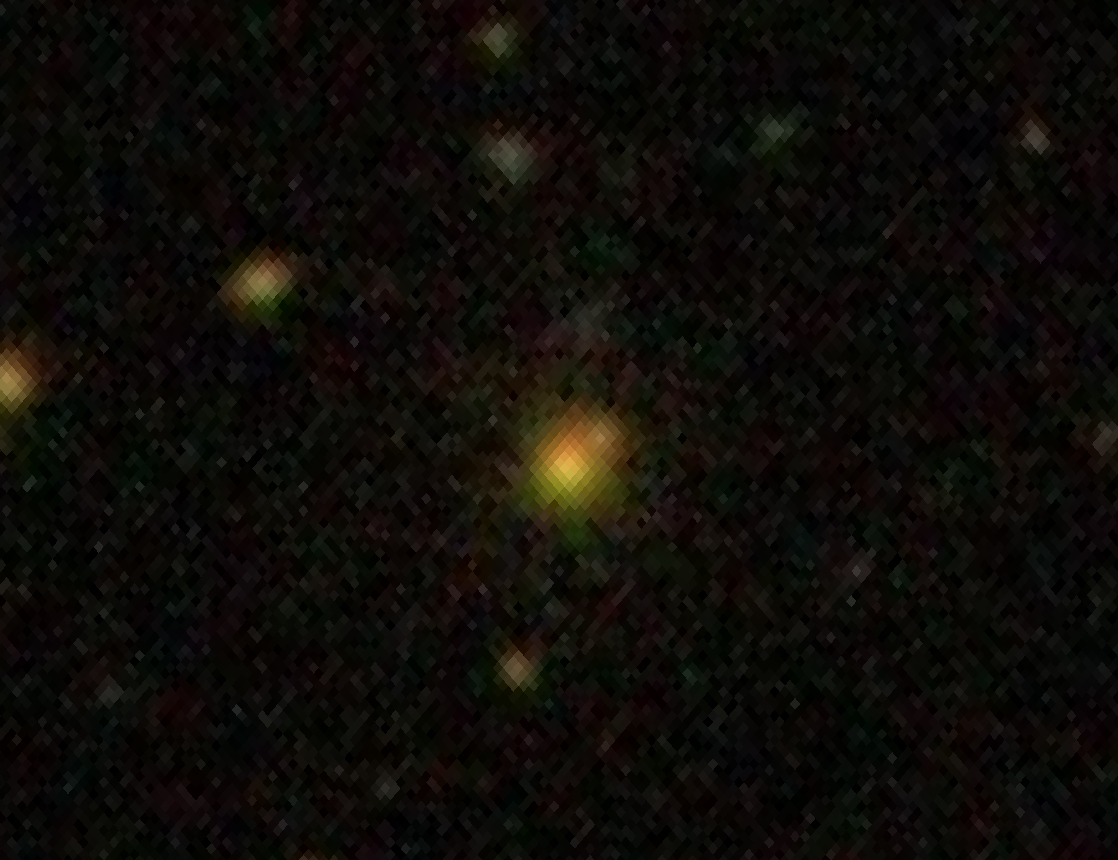
- The radio galaxy SDSS J102040.84+315510.0

Observation data (J2000.0 epoch)
- Constellation: Leo Minor
- Right ascension: 10^{h} 20^{m} 40.83^{s}
- Declination: +31° 55′ 10.21″
- Redshift: 0.285579
- Heliocentric radial velocity: 85,614 ± 14 km/s
- Distance: 4,132.0 ± 289.2 Mly (1,266.89 ± 88.68 Mpc)
- Group or cluster: WHL J102040.8+315510
- magnitude (J): 15.40

Characteristics
- Type: BrClG
- Size: ~456,000 ly (139.9 kpc) (estimated)

Other designations
- 2MASX J10204086+3155104, 7C 1017+3210 NED02, LEDA 1971163, RGZ J102040.8+315509, RGZ J102040.8+315510, NVSS J102040+315512, WHL J102040.8+315510 BCG, [YHW2016] J155.17015+31.91944

SDSS J102040.84+315510.0 also known as J102040.8+315510.0, RGZ J102040.8+315509 and WISEA J102040.83+315510.2, is a radio galaxy located in the constellation of Leo Minor. The redshift of the galaxy has been estimated to be (z) 0.285.

== Description ==
SDSS J102040.84+315510.0 is a red luminous galaxy residing as the brightest cluster galaxy (BCG) of the galaxy cluster, WHL J102040.8+315510, with at least 18 confirmed galaxy member candidates. The total r-band magnitude of the galaxy has been estimated as 17.65 while its absolute magnitude is -23.15. The g–r color value is 1.58 magnitude.

It is an elliptical galaxy. The nucleus is active and it has been categorized as a Fanaroff-Riley Class Type II radio galaxy with the total flux density calculated by the NRAO VLA Sky Survey (NVSS) at 1.4 GHz frequencies being 60.90 mJy. The calculated radio luminosity is 17.0 × 10^{24} W Hz^{-1}.

The radio lobes are resolved, with the first lobe having a length of 140.4 kiloparsecs while the other lobe has a length of 175.3 kiloparsecs. The angular separation of the lobes are estimated to be 18.9 and 23.5 arcseconds respectively. The 1.4 GHz flux densities of the lobes at 3σ cuts obtained by the Faint Images of the Radio Sky at Twenty-Centimeters (FIRST), are found to be 17.3 mJy and 19.9 mJy.

It is a bent wide-angle tail (WAT) radio galaxy, with the opening angle of the radio jet estimated to be 156.6° and the jet curvature is 125.9°. The largest linear size of the source is 325.0 kiloparsecs in total. The source is also bent with its bending angle being 2.8° while the excessive bending angle is -6.0°.
