= RGZ J145001.5+144747 =

Radio galaxy in the constellation Boötes

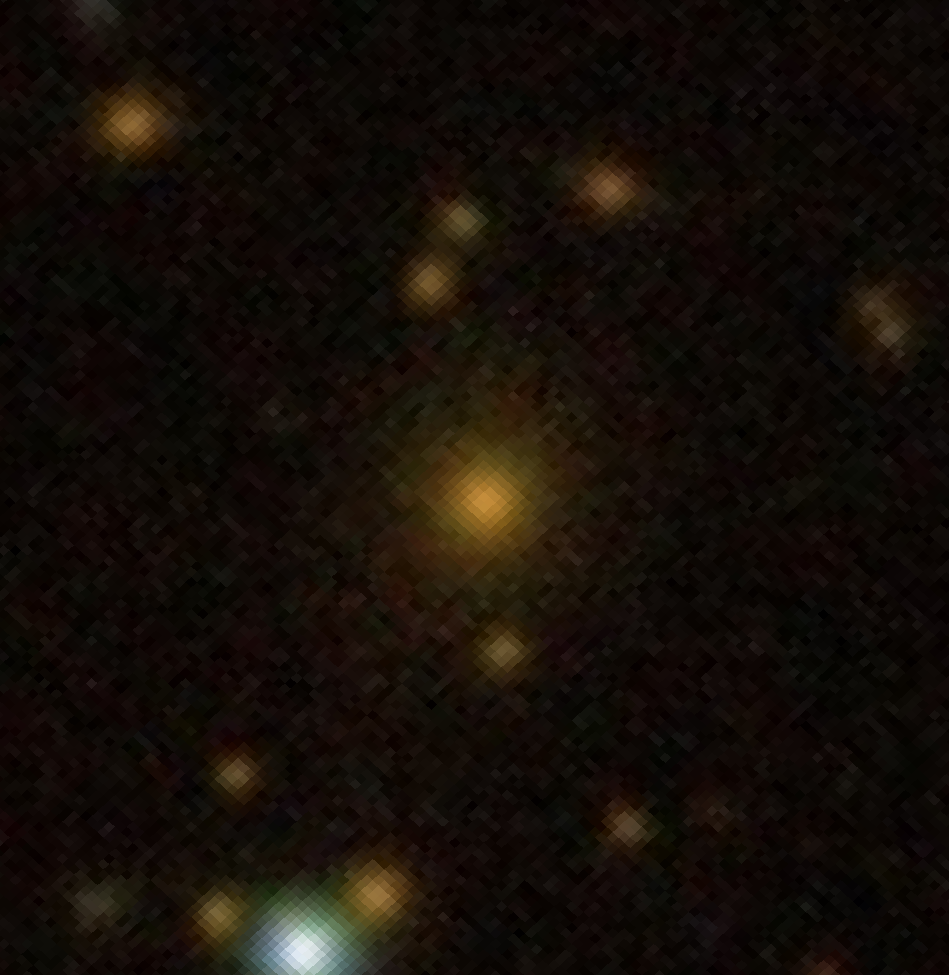
- SDSS image of RGZ J145001.5+144747

Observation data (J2000.0 epoch)
- Constellation: Boötes
- Right ascension: 14^{h} 50^{m} 01.50^{s}
- Declination: +14° 47′ 47.79″
- Redshift: 0.299553
- Heliocentric radial velocity: 89,804 ± 14 km/s
- Distance: 4,342.1 ± 303.9 Mly (1,331.28 ± 93.19 Mpc)
- Group or cluster: GMBCG J222.50624+14.79665
- magnitude (J): 14.88

Characteristics
- Type: BrClG
- Size: ~867,000 ly (265.9 kpc) (estimated)

Other designations
- 2MASX J14500148+1447476, GMBCG J222.50624+14.79665 BCG, LEDA 1467420, [LHC2018] J222.50625+14.79665, NVSS J145001+144748, SDSS J145001.49+144747.9, WHL J145001.5+144748 BCG

RGZ J145001.5+144747 also known as J145001.6+144748, is a radio galaxy located in the constellation of Boötes. The redshift of the galaxy is (z) 0.299 and it is the brightest cluster galaxy (BCG) of the galaxy cluster, GMBCG J222.50624+14.79665.

== Description ==
RGZ J145001.5+144747 is categorized as a luminous red supergiant elliptical galaxy with a z-band absolute magnitude of -23.04. The supermassive black hole located at the center of the galaxy is 8.65 M_{☉} while the g–r color values of the galaxy is 1.59 magnitude.

The nucleus is active and is a Fanaroff-Riley Class type I radio galaxy. There are two resolved radio lobes present in the east and west, with measured lobe lengths of 87 and 80 kiloparsecs. The flux density at 1.4 GHz calculated by Faint Images of the Radio Sky at Twenty-Centimeters (FIRST) for both lobes are estimated to be 29.9 and 34.1 mJy respectively at flux density cuts of 3σ. The radio source is a double and has an approximate measured bending angle of 0.8°. The source also has a C-shaped morphology with a total extent of 0.15 megaparsecs and a total radio luminosity of 25.39 W Hz^{−1}, suggesting the galaxy is located in a rich galaxy environment.

A study published in 2025, found it is a bent-tail radio galaxy (BTRG), which can be further classified as a wide-angle tail (WAT) radio galaxy. The total flux density at 3 GHz frequencies is estimated to be 47.54 mJy. The opening angle of the source is 143.4°, with the curvature of its radio jets estimated as 55.3 arcseconds. The largest linear size of the source is 285 kiloparsecs.
