= WISEA J122413.39+160600.8 =

Radio galaxy in the constellation Coma Berenices

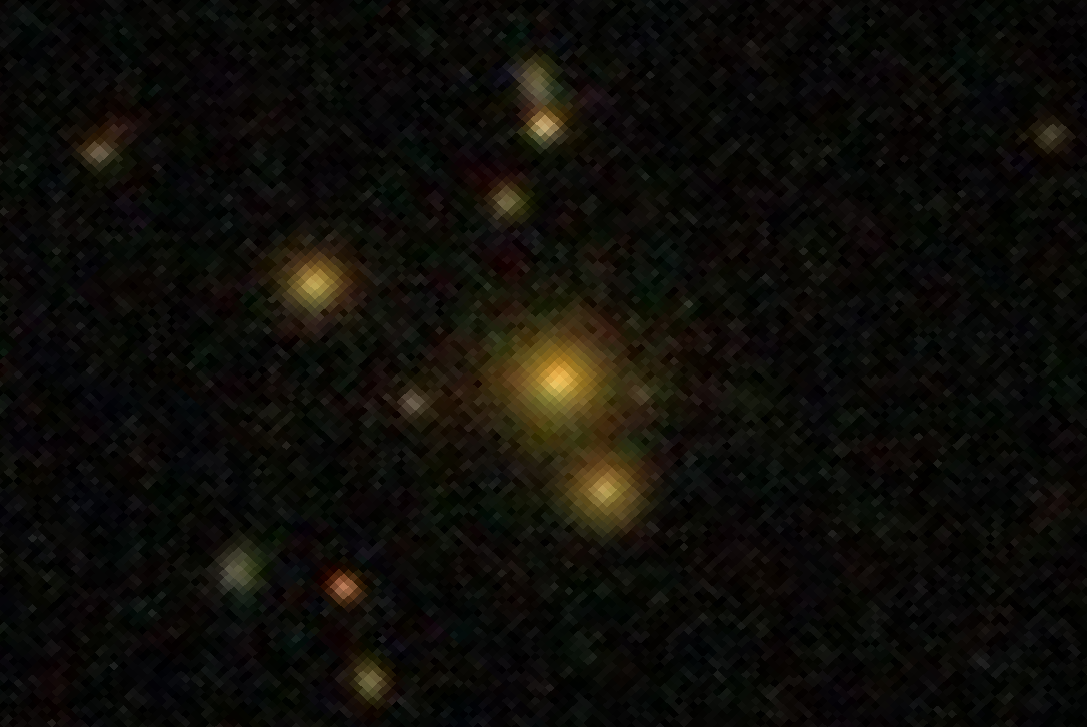
- SDSS image of WISEA J122413.39+160600.8

Observation data (J2000.0 epoch)
- Constellation: Coma Berenices
- Right ascension: 12^{h} 24^{m} 13.39^{s}
- Declination: +16° 06′ 00.89″
- Redshift: 0.233690
- Heliocentric radial velocity: 70,059 ± 13 km/s
- Distance: 3,385.8 ± 237.0 Mly (1,038.09 ± 72.67 Mpc)
- Group or cluster: WHL J122413.4+160601
- magnitude (K): 14.32

Characteristics
- Type: BrClG
- Size: ~619,500 ly (189.94 kpc) (estimated)

Other designations
- 2MASX J12241338+1606004, [LHC2018] J186.05581+16.10019, NYU-VAGC 1771198, SDSS J122413.38+160600.7, WHL J122413.4+160601 BCG, LEDA 3788214

WISEA J122413.39+160600.8 also known as NYU-VAGC 1771198, is a radio galaxy located in the constellation of Coma Berenices. The redshift of the galaxy is estimated to be at (z) 0.233.

== Description ==
WISEA J122413.39+160600.8 is an elliptical galaxy residing as the brightest cluster galaxy of the WHL J122413.4+160601 galaxy cluster with nine confirmed galaxy member candidates. The R-band magnitude of the galaxy is 16.76 whereas its absolute magnitude is -23.32. The stellar velocity dispersion of the galaxy is 310 kilometers per seconds and it has a galaxy effective radius of 10.7 kiloparsecs. The total physical size is 346 kiloparsecs.

The galaxy shows a presence of a central active galaxy nucleus and is categorized as a Fanaroff-Riley Class Type II radio galaxy with a total flux density of 87.00 mJy measured by NRAO VLA Sky Survey at 1.4 GHz frequencies. Radio imaging made with Faint Images of the Radio Sky at Twenty-Centimeters (FIRST) found it is a hybrid radio galaxy with the first radio lobe displaying a FR-I morphology while the other lobe has a FR-II morphology. The radio core is detected and it has a core flux density of 4.23 mJy. The luminosity distance of the source is 1177.9 megaparsecs. The total radio power at 1.4 GHz is estimated to be 25.17 W Hz^{-1}.

A study in 2025 described it as a narrow-angle-tail (NAT) radio galaxy. The radio jets are resolved with the opening angle estimated to be 36.8° whereas the jet curvature radius is 12.3 arcseconds. The spectral index is found to be 0.94α between 1.4 and 3 GHz frequencies. The largest angular size of the source is 85 arcseconds while the largest linear size is 327.0 kiloparsecs. The g–r color value of the galaxy is 1.48 magnitude.
