= SDSS J114033.75+563927.8 =

Radio galaxy in the constellation of Ursa Major

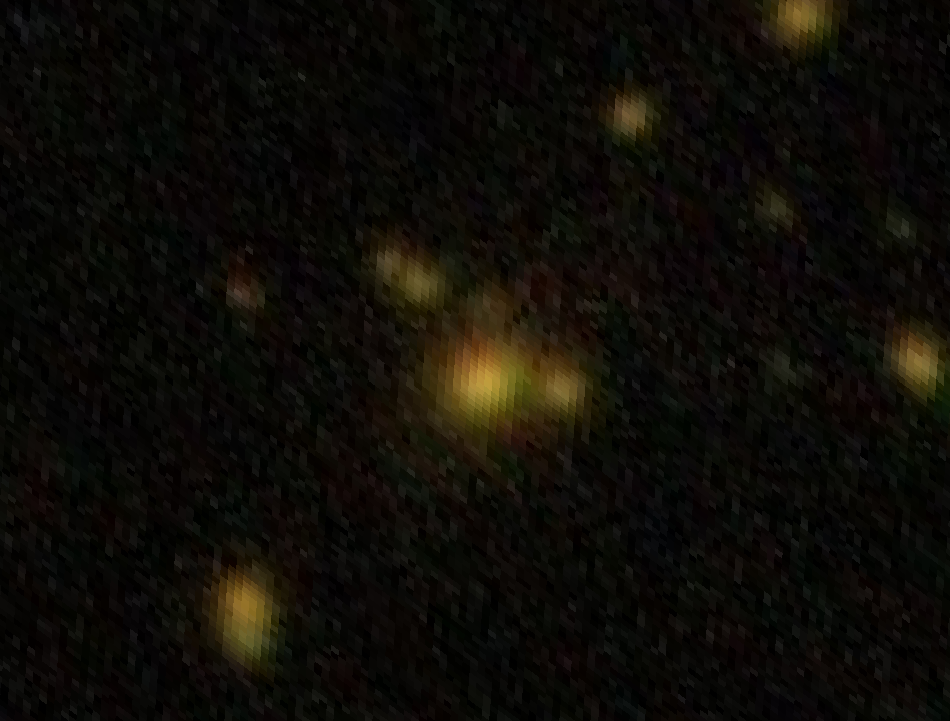
- SDSS image of SDSS J114033.75+563927.8

Observation data (J2000.0 epoch)
- Constellation: Ursa Major
- Right ascension: 11^{h} 40^{m} 33.72^{s}
- Declination: +56° 39′ 28.09″
- Redshift: 0.296712
- Heliocentric radial velocity: 89,115 ± 20 km/s
- Distance: 4,290.4 ± 300.3 Mly (1,315.45 ± 92.08 Mpc)
- Group or cluster: WHL J114033.7+563928
- magnitude (J): 15.28
- magnitude (H): 14.50

Characteristics
- Type: BrClG
- Size: ~588,000 ly (180.4 kpc) (estimated)

Other designations
- 2MASX J11403379+5639275, ILT J114033.7+563929.2, SAGA DR3 916076200000001062, LEDA 2543688, NVSS J114033+563928, WHL J114033.7+563928 BCG, [YHW2016] J175.14056+56.65778

SDSS J114033.75+563927.8 also known as SAGA DR3 916076200000001062, is a radio galaxy located in the constellation of Ursa Major. The redshift of the galaxy has been estimated to be (z) 0.296.

== Description ==
SDSS J114033.75+563927.8 is the brightest cluster galaxy of the WHL J114033.7+563928 galaxy cluster belonging to a supercluster with 54 confirmed galaxy member candidates. Its R-band magnitude is 17.59 while its absolute magnitude is -23.43. The host is classified as an elliptical galaxy with a g–r color magnitude of 1.67 and a total surface brightness of 20.735 magnitude per arcsecond square based on DESI Legacy Surveys imaging. The axis ratio of the host galaxy is 0.650 and the position angle is -58.596°. The total stellar mass has been calculated as 12.66 M_{☉}.

The central nucleus is active and has been categorized as a non-bent compact radio galaxy with an estimated flux density of 21.00 mJy by the NRAO VLA Sky Survey (NVSS). The radio morphology is elongated, mainly described by a single elliptical profile component, although radio imaging by Faint Images of the Radio Sky at Twenty-Centimeters (FIRST) suggested a compact morphology, described by a single point-like component. There is a radio core, with the core flux density estimated as 20.59 mJy, and the radio emission flux density is 20.80 mJy. The total radio power is 5.89 × 10^{24} WHz^{−1}.
