= WN B1127.5+4927 =

Radio galaxy in the constellation Ursa Major

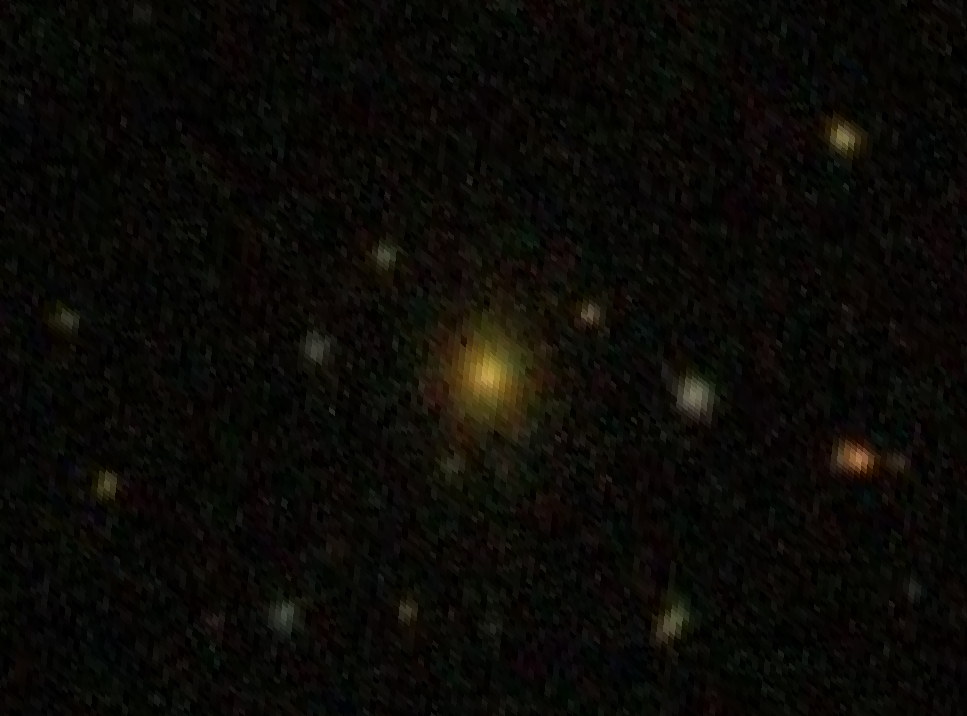
- SDSS image of WN B1127.5+4927

Observation data (J2000.0 epoch)
- Constellation: Ursa Major
- Right ascension: 11^{h} 30^{m} 18.32^{s}
- Declination: +49° 11′ 16.08″
- Redshift: 0.260465
- Heliocentric radial velocity: 78,085 ± 18 km/s
- Distance: 3,766.3 ± 263.6 Mly (1,154.74 ± 80.83 Mpc)
- Group or cluster: WHL J113018.3+491116
- magnitude (K): 14.90

Characteristics
- Type: BrClG
- Size: ~291,000 ly (89.1 kpc) (estimated)

Other designations
- 2MASS J11301832+4911163, [LHC2018] J172.57632+49.18780, LEDA 2335893, NYU-VAGC 0795797, RGZ J113018.3+491116, SDSS J113018.32+491116.0, WHL J113018.3+491116 BCG, [YHW2016] J172.57631+49.18781

WN B1127.5+4927 also known as RGZ J113018.3+491116 and NYU-VAGC 0795797, is a radio galaxy located in the constellation of Ursa Major. The redshift of the galaxy is (z) 0.260 and it was first discovered as a background astronomical radio source by astronomers in January 1989.

== Description ==
WN B1127.5+4927 is a red luminous galaxy residing as the brightest cluster galaxy of the WHL J113018.3+491116 galaxy cluster with 29 confirmed galaxy member candidates. The R-band magnitude of the galaxy has been estimated to be 17.46 magnitude while the absolute magnitude is -23.20. Its stellar velocity dispersion is calculated to be 284 kilometers per seconds and has an effective radius of 13.8 kiloparsecs. The total physical size of the galaxy is 222 kiloparsecs. The R-band luminosity is 6.90 × 10^{10} L_{ʘ} while the Z-band luminosity is 8.47 × 10^{10} L_{ʘ}.

The central nucleus is found to be active and is categorized as a bend Fanaroff-Riley Class Type II radio galaxy hosting a FRII-like radio source. The total flux density measured by NRAO VLA Sky Survey (NVSS) has been estimated to be 15.90 mJy at 1.4 GHz frequencies. The angular size of the source is 39 arcseconds whereas the linear size is 157.2 kiloparsecs. The total radio luminosity at 1.4 GHz is 25.04 W Hz^{−1}.

A study published in 2012, has found a pair of resolved radio lobes. The projected length of the first lobe is found to be 81.1 kiloparsecs while the second lobe has a projected length of 118.1 kiloparsecs. The angular separation of the lobes are estimated to be 12.7 and 18.4 arcseconds respectively. The galaxy also contains a presence of a double radio source with an unresolved radio core. The eastern and western lobes have linear sizes of 100 × 52 and 80 × 72 kiloparsecs respectively in total. Evidence also found the source is bend with a measured bending angle of 0.0° while the excess bending angle is -7.3°.
