= SDSS J104902.07+542348.9 =

Radio galaxy in the constellation Ursa Major

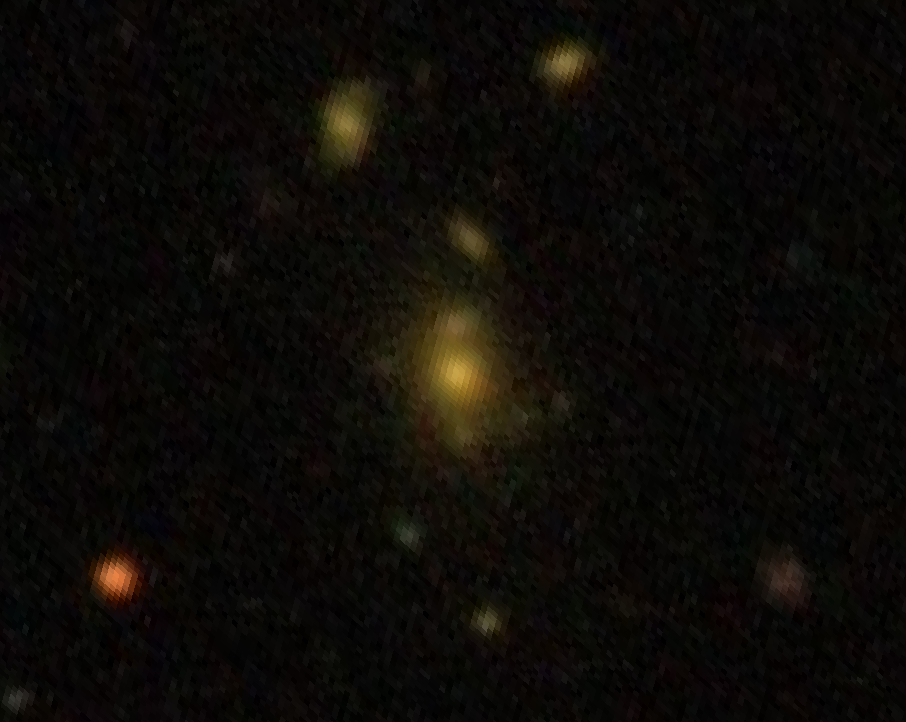
- SDSS image of SDSS J104902.07+542348.9

Observation data (J2000.0 epoch)
- Constellation: Ursa Major
- Right ascension: 10^{h} 49^{m} 02.06^{s}
- Declination: +54° 23′ 49.20″
- Redshift: 0.249140
- Heliocentric radial velocity: 74,690 ± 15 km/s
- Distance: 3,601.5 ± 252.1 Mly (1,104.23 ± 77.30 Mpc)
- Group or cluster: WHL J104902.1+542349
- magnitude (J): 15.19

Characteristics
- Type: BrClG AGN
- Size: ~651,000 ly (199.6 kpc) (estimated)

Other designations
- 2MASX J10490201+5423483, 7C 1045+5439, [BKH2005] 0906-004, LEDA 2468439, [LHC2018] J162.25867+54.39699, NVSS J104902+542348, [YCH2015] J162.2586+54.3969, WHL J104902.1+542349 BCG

SDSS J104902.07+542348.9 also known as [LHC2018] J162.25867+54.39699, is a radio galaxy located in the constellation of Ursa Major. The redshift of the galaxy is estimated to be (z) 0.249.

== Description ==
SDSS J104902.07+542348.9 is an elliptical galaxy in stages of a gravitational interaction with another galaxy. It is also the brightest cluster galaxy of the WHL J104902.1+542349 galaxy cluster with 15 confirmed galaxy members. The R-band magnitude of the galaxy has been calculated to be 16.94 magnitude while its absolute magnitude is -23.63.

The nucleus is found to be active and it has been categorized as a non-bent compact radio galaxy with its total flux density estimated to be 16.40 mJy by NRAO VLA Sky Survey (NVSS). The radio source morphology is mainly elongated, described as a single elliptical profile component although radio imaging made with NVSS suggested the radio emission is blended together with other radio sources. A radio core is detected and it has a core flux density of 12.80 mJy while the radio emission has the same flux density as the core. The total radio flux density at 1.4 GHz is 16.4 mJy while the total radio power is 3.10 × 10^{24} WHz^{−1}.

A study has found the stellar mass of the galaxy is 11.33 M_{☉}. The log radio luminosity is 24.47 W Hz^{−1} whereas the rest frame r^{0.1} magnitude is -22.74 with further evidence that the central AGN (active galactic nucleus) is powering the source. The infrared J-band and H-band magnitudes of the galaxy are estimated to be 16.19 and 15.34 respectively while the W3 band magnitude is 11.98.
