= RGZ J172749.5+534647 =

Radio galaxy in the constellation Draco

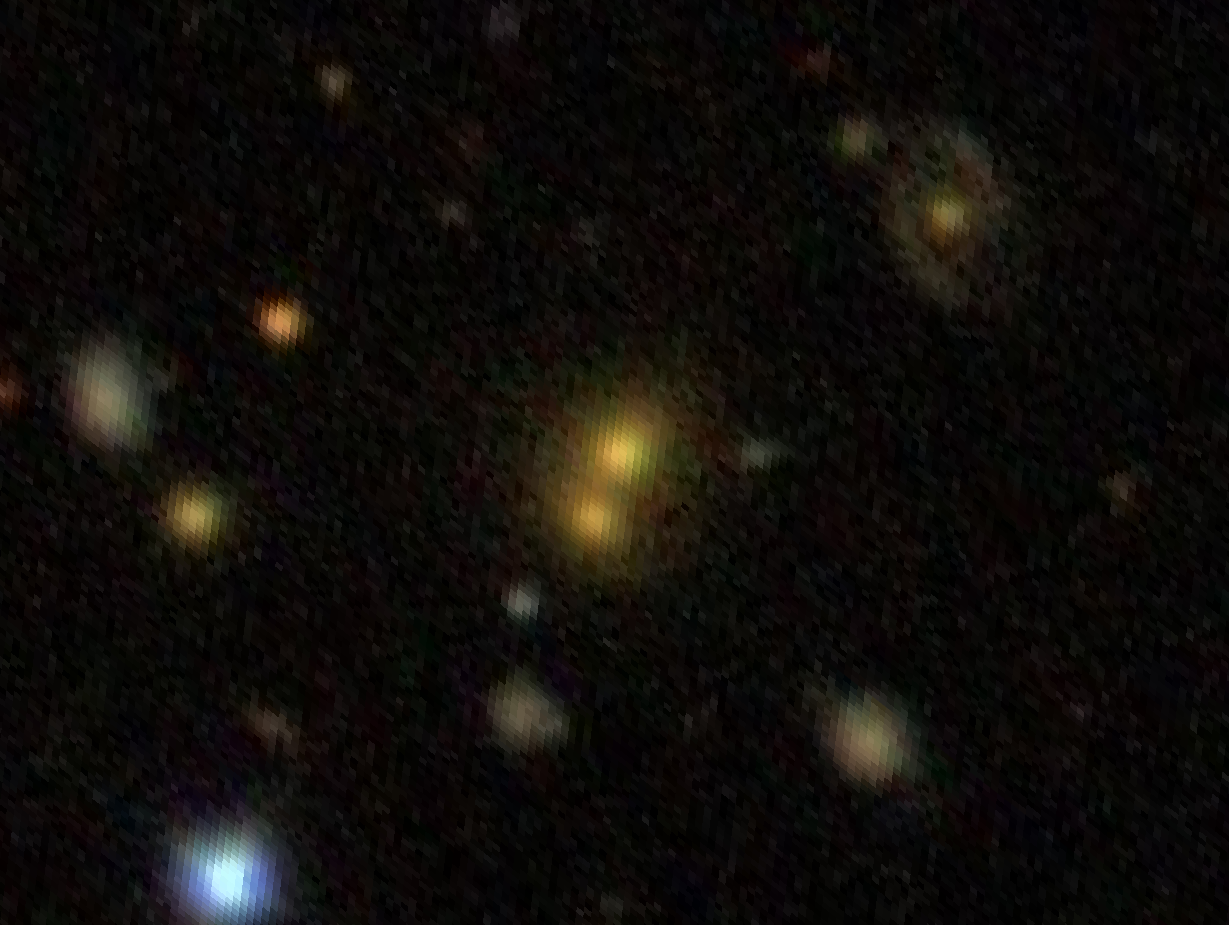
- SDSS image of RGZ J172749.5+534647

Observation data (J2000.0 epoch)
- Constellation: Draco
- Right ascension: 17^{h} 27^{m} 49.70^{s}
- Declination: +53° 46′ 51.98″
- Redshift: 0.207131
- Heliocentric radial velocity: 62,096 ± 9 km/s
- Distance: 2,984.7 ± 208.9 Mly (915.12 ± 64.06 Mpc)
- Group or cluster: WHL J172749.7+534652
- magnitude (J): 14.80

Characteristics
- Type: FR II
- Size: ~562,000 ly (172.4 kpc) (estimated)

Other designations
- 2MASX J17274974+5346513, NVGRC J172749.9+534647, LEDA 2450625, RGZ J172749.5+534647, SDSS J172749.68+534651.6, WHL J172749.7+534652 BCG

RGZ J172749.5+534647 also known as J172749+534651, is a radio galaxy in the constellation of Draco. The redshift of the galaxy is (z) 0.207.

== Description ==
RGZ J172749.5+534647 is a red luminous galaxy residing as the brightest cluster galaxy (BCG) of the galaxy cluster, WHL J172749.7+534652 with at least 18 confirmed galaxy member candidates. The r-band magnitude for the galaxy is estimated to be 17.22 magnitude. The absolute magnitude of the galaxy is -22.77.

The nucleus is categorized as active and it is a Fanaroff-Riley Class Type II radio galaxy. A study published in 2011, reported the presence of both a radio core and hot spot features. The total radio luminosity is 26.6 W Hz^{-1} and the radio flux density is 1040.5 mJy at 1.4 GHz frequencies. The source has a total angular size of 146.4 arcseconds and a linear size of 496.37 kiloparsecs.

The radio lobes are resolved, with the eastern radio lobe having a 1.4 GHz flux density of 188.2 mJy, while the western lobe has a flux density of 486.7 mJy, based on data made by the Faint Images of the Radio Sky at Twenty-Centimeters (FIRST) at 3σ flux density cuts. The lengths of the lobes at 3σ cuts are 193 and 239 kiloparsecs respectively. It is also a giant radio source approximately 4.5 arcseconds in extent and is further categorized as a double-lobed galaxy with a possible core-jet structure.
