= 4C 10.45 =

Quasar in the constellation Serpens

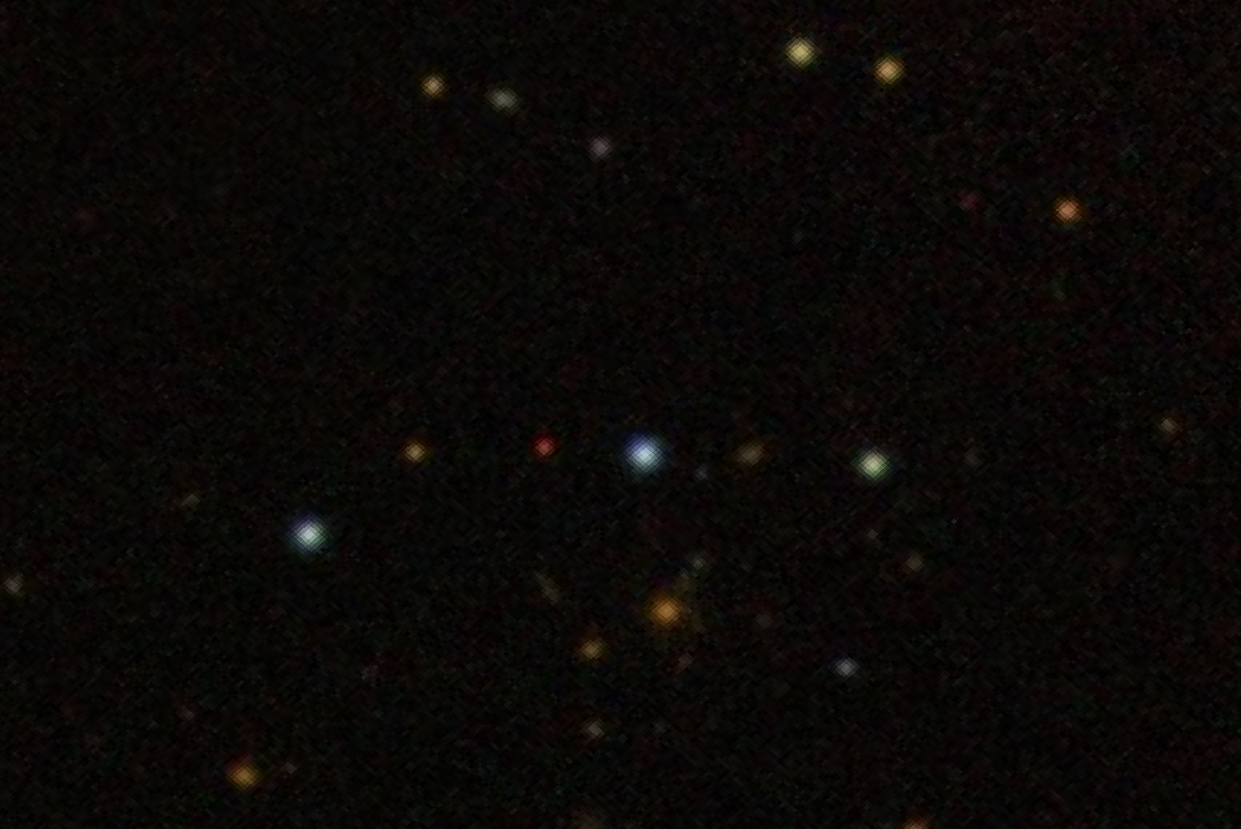
- SDSS image of 4C 10.45.

Observation data (J2000.0 epoch)
- Constellation: Serpens
- Right ascension: 16^{h} 08^{m} 46.20^{s}
- Declination: +10° 29′ 07.77″
- Redshift: 1.232890
- Heliocentric radial velocity: 369,611 km/s
- Distance: 8.772 Gly
- Apparent magnitude (V): 18.70

Characteristics
- Type: FSRQ; LPQ blazar
- Size: ~160,000 ly (49 kpc) (estimated)

Other designations
- PKS 1606+10, 2MASS J16084620+1029075, LEDA 2818941, OS +111, DA 401, NVSS J160846+102908, FIRST J160846.1+102907, CoNFIG 238, TXS 1606+105, VERA J1608+1029, WMAP 009, RX J1608.7+1028, SDSS J160846.20+102907.7

4C 10.45 is a radio-loud quasar located in the constellation of Serpens. The redshift of the object is (z) 1.232 and it was first discovered in 1968 by astronomers, designated as PKS 1606+10 based on a Parkes Catalogue of Radio Sources survey. The radio spectrum of the quasar is flat, thereby classifying it a flat-spectrum radio quasar.

== Description ==
4C 10.45 has been categorized as a blazar, being variable on the electromagnetic spectrum. It has shown extreme gamma-ray activity on 29 October 2024 and on 27 May 2025, with daily average fluxes of 0.9 ± 0.2 × 10^{−6} photons cm^{−2} s^{−1} and 1.0 ± 0.2 × 10^{−6} photons cm^{−2} s^{−1} respectively. It was also shown to be a bright optical state indicating an active state. EGERT (Energetic Gamma Ray Experiment Telescope) observations have showed the source having a gamma-ray spectrum of 1.64 ± 0.24 × 10^{−9}.

The source of 4C 10.45 is compact, being made of a radio core that is 0.5 milliarcseconds in size, with evidence of radio emission extending towards northwest direction. The total peak flux density of the core and extended components at six centimeters are estimated to be 1.5 and 1.6.

Observations with Very Long Baseline Interferometry (VLBI) also showed the source has a presence of a jet made out of various components. This jet also displays a sharp bend by one milliarcsecond from the core region between the position angles of -80° and -40°. A weak knot feature is seen at the position of the jet bend. The jet angle along the line of sight is estimated to be 1.8° with an apparent opening angle of 8.8°. VLBI observations found four of the components in the jet are moving in superluminal motions while the other component is stationary. The velocities of the four moving components are estimated to be 3.4 ± 1.7, 2.4 ± 1.1, 8.0 ± 5.9 and 6.1 ± 6.0 hours per second while the stationary component barely moves at 0.0 ± 0.9 hours per second.

The optical spectrum of the quasar shows two emission lines classified as being broad. When studied, it has lines of mainly C III and ionized magnesium (Mg II). It is also found the quasar shows a narrow-line type and is surrounded by foreground galaxies.
