= MACS J1447.4+0827 BCG =

Brightest cluster galaxy in the constellation Boötes

MACS J1447.4+0826 BCG
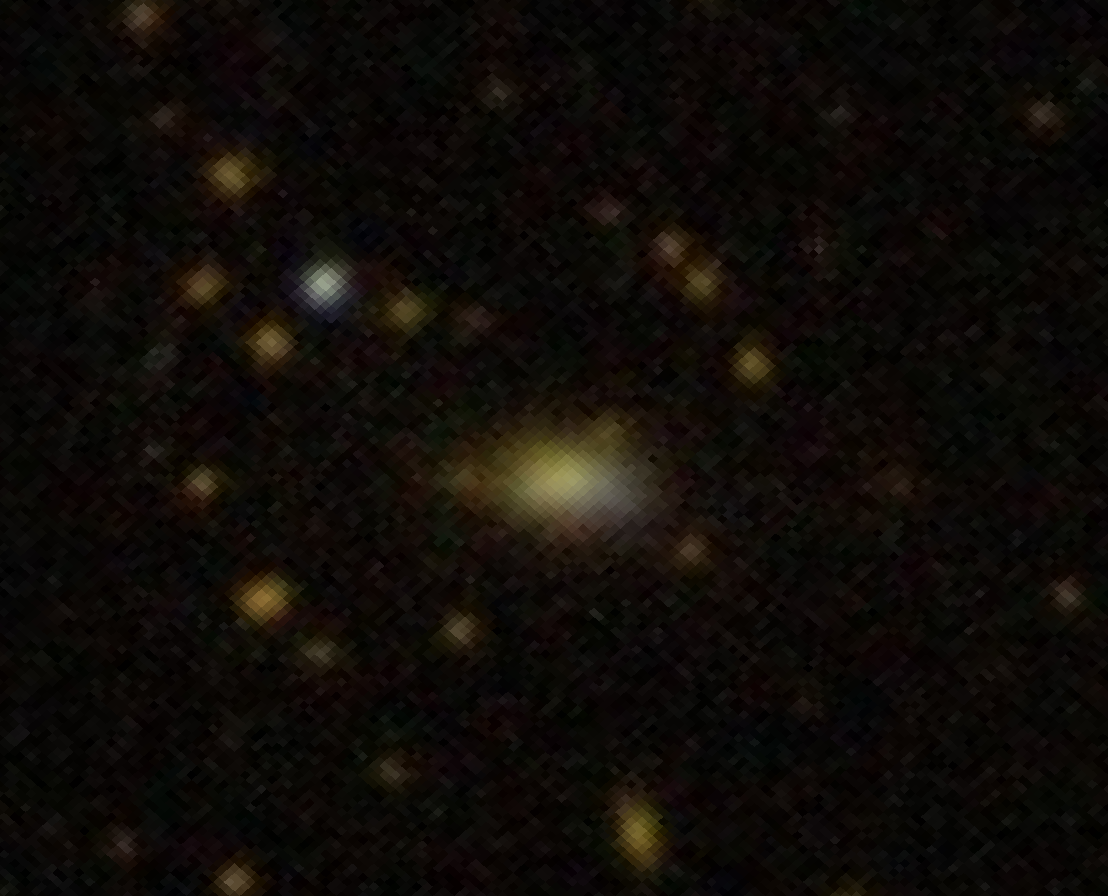
- SDSS image of MACS J1447.4+0827 BCG

Observation data (J2000.0 epoch)
- Constellation: Boötes
- Right ascension: 14^{h} 47^{m} 26.00^{s}
- Declination: +08° 28′ 25.09″
- Redshift: 0.375463
- Heliocentric radial velocity: 112,561 ± 3 km/s
- Distance: 5,415.8 ± 379.1 Mly (1,660.48 ± 116.23 Mpc)
- Magnitude (J): 15.06
- Magnitude (H): 14.81

Characteristics
- Type: BrCIG
- Size: ~569,000 ly (174.6 kpc) (estimated)

Other designations
- 2MASX J14472597+0828253, NVSS J144726+082825, MACS J1447.4+0827 BCG, SDSS J144726.02+082825.1 LEDA 3833752

MACS J1447.4+0827 BCG (short for MACS J1447.4+0827 Brightest Cluster Galaxy), is a massive elliptical galaxy residing as the brightest cluster galaxy of the X-ray luminous galaxy cluster, MACS J1447.4+0827 which is also known as RX J1447.4+0827. The redshift of the galaxy is estimated to be (z) 0.37 and it contains an active galactic nucleus (AGN) based on evidence of a central point-like region that is coincident with its position.

== Description ==
MACS J1447.4+0827 BCG is classified as a central galaxy. When observed with the Hubble Space Telescope (HST), it is contains filament structures depicted as optically bright with an extent of around 25 kiloparsecs in total. Two of the filament structures are shown positioned from west to south and west to north respectively.

The nucleus of the galaxy is active and it has been classified as a radio galaxy with the presence of strong emission lines in its optical spectrum. Radio imaging made by the Very Large Array (VLA), showed there is a compact radio component that coincides with an X-ray source and the presence of radio emission that is extending outwards by 160 kiloparsecs. There is also evidence of two X-ray cavities located both north and south from the BCG, with a cavity power of 6 × 10^{44} erg s^{−1.}These cavities have an elliptical morphology and an extent of 32 kiloparsecs in. Two collimated radio jets emerge outwards with a measured radius of 20 kiloparsecs. A diffused component extends from the inner jet regions. This component is estimated to have a spectral index of -1.2 ± 1.0 and has a total radio power of 3.0 ± 0.3 × 10^{24} W Hz^{−1}. A study also found the jets are also aligned together with the cavities. The mass of the central supermassive black hole of the BCG is estimated to be in the range of 9 to 10 × 10^{9} M_{☉}.

The total star formation rate of the BCG is found be 60-80 M_{☉} per year. There is also evidence of a molecular gas reservoir region, elongated from east to west direction, with the total molecular gas mass estimated as 9 × 10^{10} M_{☉}. A study showed detections of carbon oxide (CO) emitting components located in the center, and both the subregions located in the eastern and western directions. One of the components is shown to have a high velocity dispersion of 200 kilometers per seconds.
