= ILT J160811.30+325427.2 =

Radio galaxy in the constellation Corona Borealis

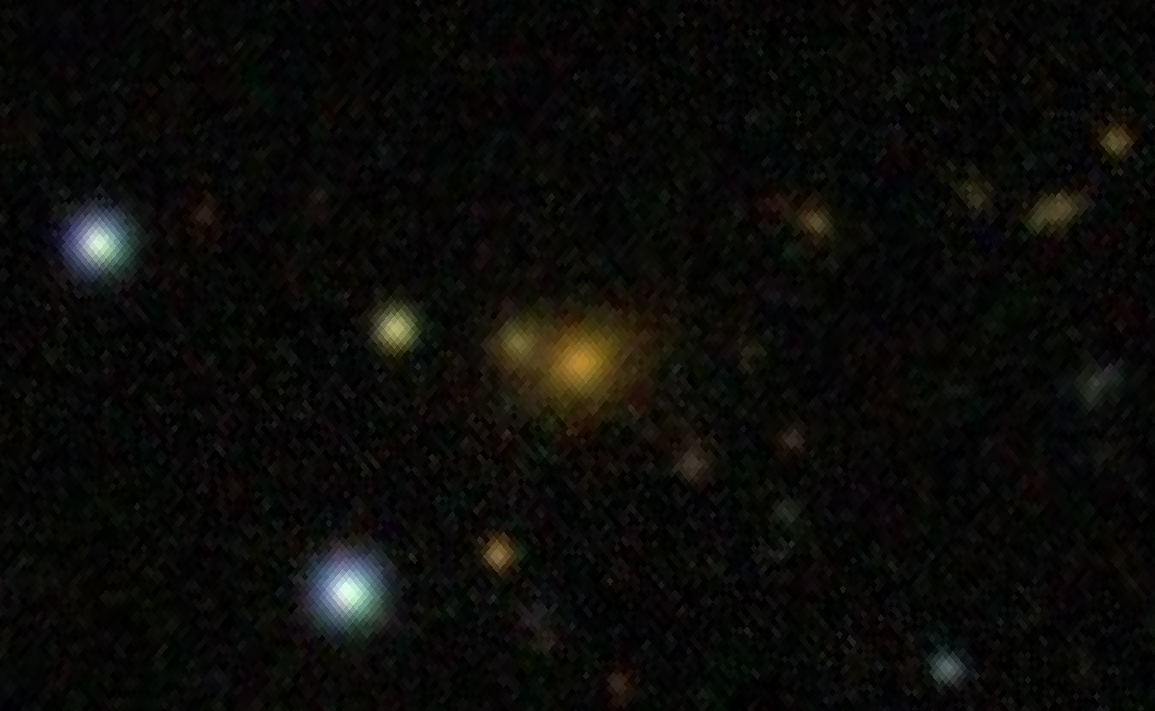
- SDSS image of ILT J160811.30+325427.2

Observation data (J2000.0 epoch)
- Constellation: Corona Borealis
- Right ascension: 16^{h} 08^{m} 10.899^{s}
- Declination: +32° 54′ 18.70″
- Redshift: 0.303826
- Heliocentric radial velocity: 91,085 ± 17 km/s
- Distance: 4,384.6 ± 306.9 Mly (1,344.33 ± 94.10 Mpc)
- Group or cluster: WHL J160810.9+325419
- magnitude (K): 15.04

Characteristics
- Type: BrClG
- Size: ~461,000 ly (141.2 kpc) (estimated)

Other designations
- 2MASX J16081090+3254194, [PFR2025] J242.0471+32.908, [YHW2016] J242.04532+32.90520, SDSS J160810.80+325418.9, WHL J160810.9+325419 BCG, LEDA 3569818

ILT J160811.30+325427.2 is a radio galaxy located in the constellation of Corona Borealis. The redshift of the galaxy is estimated to be (z) 0.303.

== Description ==
ILT J160811.30+325427.2 is an elliptical galaxy residing as the brightest cluster galaxy of the WHL J160810.9+325419 galaxy cluster with nine confirmed galaxy member candidates. The R-band magnitude of the galaxy is estimated to be 17.57 while its absolute magnitude is -23.54

The galaxy has a presence of an active galactic nucleus and is categorized as a bend-tail or a Fanaroff-Riley Class Type II radio galaxy hosting a FR II-like radio source with its total flux density estimated to be 87.00 mJy by NRAO VLA Sky Survey (NVSS) at 1.4 GHz frequencies. Radio imaging made by Faint Images of the Radio Sky at Twenty-Centimeters (FIRST) found the radio morphology is mainly hybrid with one radio lobe being of Fanaroff-Riley Type I while the other lobe is of Fanaroff-Riley Type II. The radio core is detected and has a flux density of 3.91 mJy while the radio emission has a flux density of 65.60 mJy.

A study found it is a giant double-double radio galaxy with its components position from east to west directions. The projected sizes of both its inner and outer radio lobes are estimated to be 740 and 142 kiloparsecs in extent. The misalignment angle between its outer lobes and the radio core is 26.4° whereas the misalignment angle between both the outer and inner lobes is 5.5°. It is also a C-shaped radio galaxy residing in a poor galaxy environment, with the total source extent estimated as 0.23 megaparsecs. The total radio luminosity is 25.33 W Hz^{-1} while the total radio power has been found to be 26.61 × 10^{24} WHz^{-1}.
