= SDSS J092255.18+541828.2 =

Radio galaxy in the constellation Ursa Major

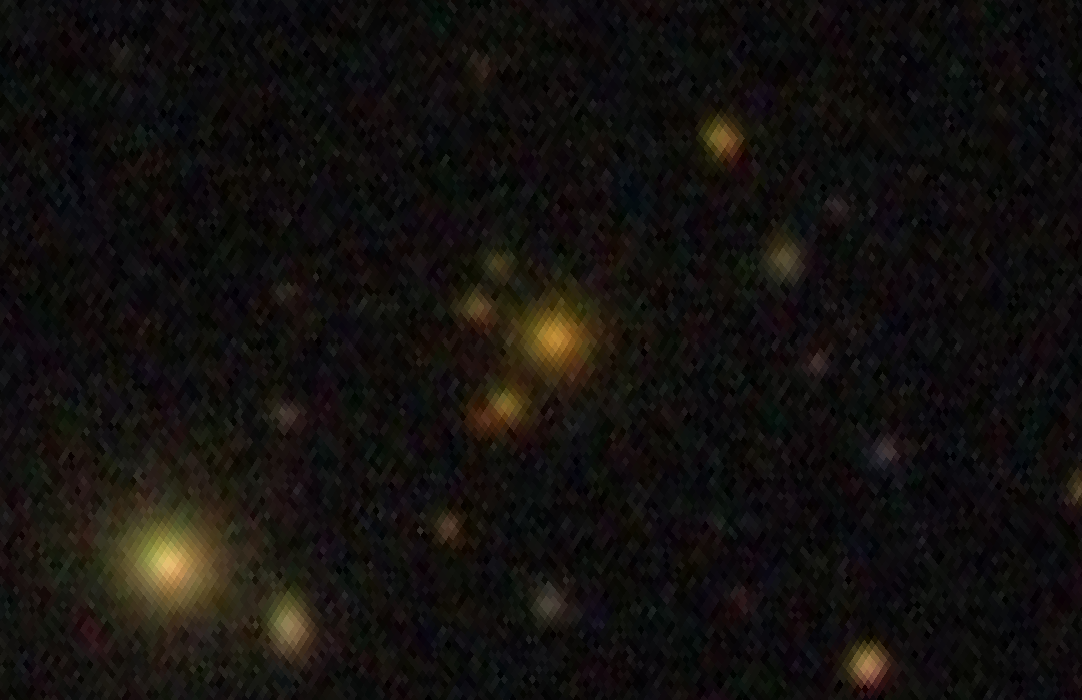
- The radio galaxy SDSS J092255.18+541828.2

Observation data (J2000.0 epoch)
- Constellation: Ursa Major
- Right ascension: 09^{h} 22^{m} 55.25^{s}
- Declination: +54° 18′ 28.06″
- Redshift: 0.337095
- Heliocentric radial velocity: 101,058 ± 22 km/s
- Distance: 4,868.9 ± 340.8 Mly (1,492.81 ± 104.50 Mpc)
- Group or cluster: WHL J092255.2+541829
- magnitude (K): 14.63

Characteristics
- Type: FR II
- Size: ~710,000 ly (217.6 kpc) (estimated)

Other designations
- 2MASX J09225523+5418285, LEDA 2465719, [VFK2015] J140.73028+54.30805, [YHW2016] J140.72986+54.30793, WHL J092255.2+541829 BCG

SDSS J092255.18+541828.2 also known as J092255+541828 and [VFK2015] J140.73028+54.30805, is a radio galaxy located in the constellation of Ursa Major. The redshift of the galaxy is (z) 0.337.

== Description ==
SDSS J092255.18+541828.2 is a red luminous galaxy residing as the brightest cluster galaxy of the WHL J092255.2+541829 galaxy cluster with eight confirmed galaxy member candidates. The R-band magnitude of the galaxy is estimated to be 18.23 magnitude. The absolute magnitude of the galaxy is -22.98.

The nucleus is found to be active and it has been classified as a non-bend tail Fanaroff-Riley Type II radio galaxy with its total flux density of 41.00 mJy estimated by NRAO VLA Sky Survey (NVSS) at 1.4 GHz frequencies. The total radio luminosity is found to be 25.66 W Hz^{-1} with the total angular size of the source being 53 arcseconds while the total linear size of the source is 255.39 kiloparsecs. There is no detection of either a radio core or hotspot features. Evidence suggested the source has a size of 48.94 arcseconds while the radio luminosity is 25.15 W Hz^{-1}.

A study finds both of the radio lobes are resolved with the lobe flux density of 0.0418 mJy and have a projected separation of 0.0135°. A radio core is also detected in additional, with the core's flux density estimated to be 0.0094 mJy. There are two Gaussian components present. The total radio power has been estimated as 17.10 × 10^{24} WHz^{-1}.
