= SDSS J121143.17+080108.3 =

Radio galaxy in the constellation Virgo

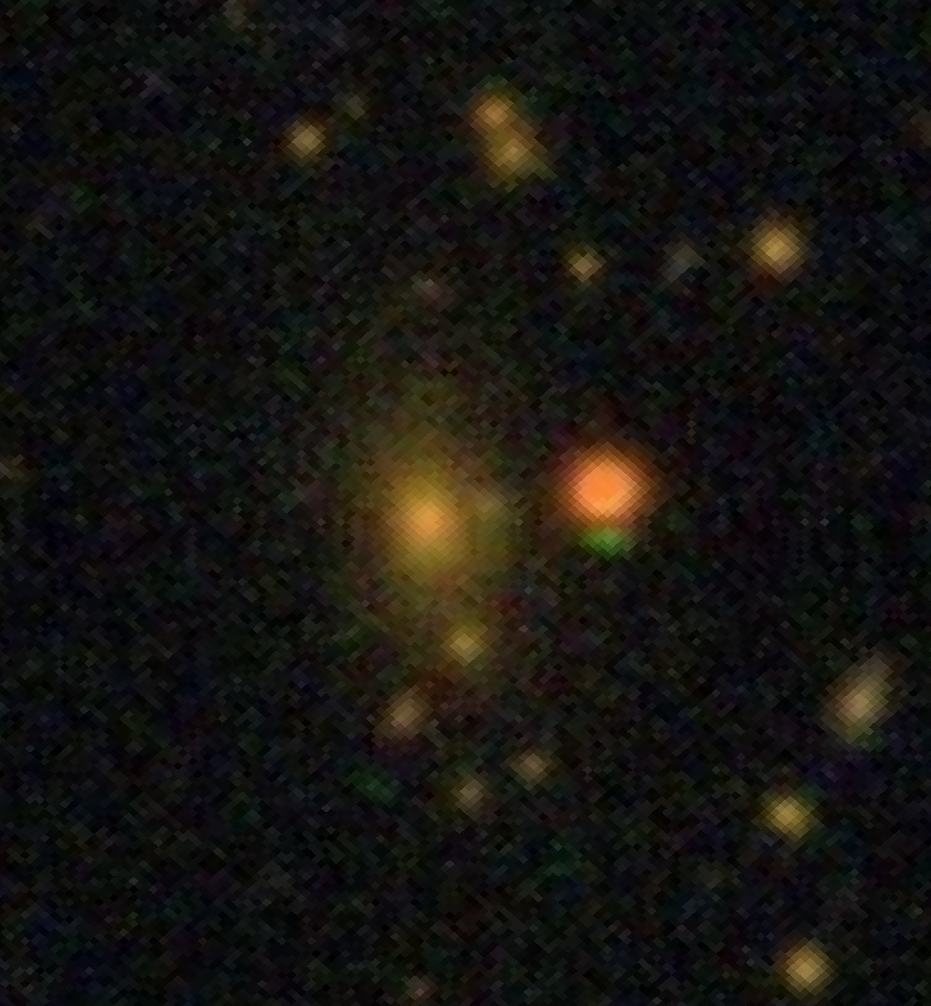
- The radio galaxy SDSS J121143.17+080108.3

Observation data (J2000.0 epoch)
- Constellation: Virgo
- Right ascension: 12^{h} 11^{m} 43.15^{s}
- Declination: +08° 01′ 08.15″
- Redshift: 0.248118
- Heliocentric radial velocity: 74,384 ± 13 km/s
- Distance: 3,597.5 ± 251.8 Mly (1,103.01 ± 77.21 Mpc)
- Group or cluster: WHL J121143.2+080108
- magnitude (K): 13.06

Characteristics
- Type: BrClG
- Size: ~924,000 ly (283.4 kpc) (estimated)

Other designations
- 2MASX J12114313+0801071, OGC 0092, LEDA 1336878, [BCB2018] BCG 00304, [LHC2018] J182.92989+08.01896, RGB J1211+080, NVSS J121143+080108, TXS 1209+382, WHL J121143.2+080108 BCG, [YHW2016] J182.92986+08.01897

SDSS J121143.17+080108.3 also known as OGC 92, is a radio galaxy located in the constellation of Virgo. The redshift of the galaxy is (z) 0.248 and it was first discovered as a discrete astronomical radio source from the 87GB Catalogue of Radio Sources by astronomers in April 1991.

== Description ==
SDSS J121143.17+080108.3 is a supergiant elliptical galaxy with a Type E galaxy morphology. It is also a red luminous galaxy residing as the brightest cluster galaxy (BCG) in the center of the galaxy cluster, WHL J121143.2+080108, with 47 confirmed galaxy member candidates.

The total r-band magnitude of the galaxy is 16.44 magnitude and the total infrared i-band luminosity is estimated to be 24.32 × 10^{10} L_{☉}. The absolute magnitude of the galaxy is -24.16. A total stellar mass of 11.51 h^{−2} M_{☉} has been calculated for the galaxy.

Its nucleus is active and it has been categorized as an ordinary Fanaroff-Riley Class Type I radio galaxy with its total radio flux density estimated as 85.00 mJy at 1.4 GHz frequencies by NRAO VLA Sky Survey (NVSS). The radio power at 1.4 GHz is 15.82 × 10^{24} WHz^{−1}. The size of the source is approximately 33.63 arcseconds. A study published in 2018 has calculated the 1.4 GHz flux density is 87.1 mJy and the radio luminosity is 25.19 WH z^{−1}.
