= SDSS J094836.34+154813.3 =

Radio galaxy in the constellation Leo

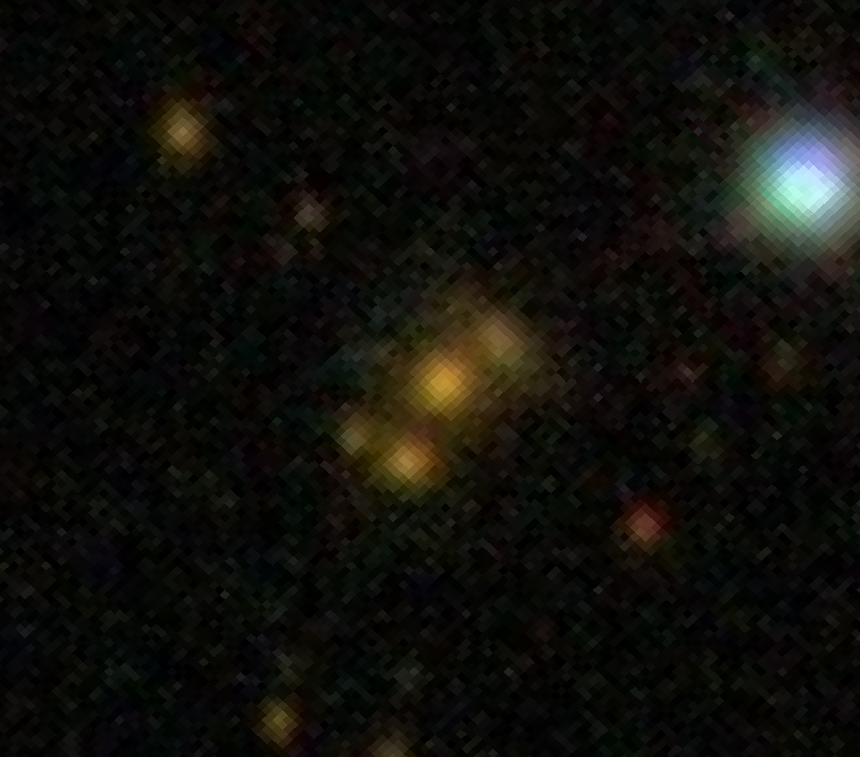
- SDSS image of SDSS J094836.34+154813.3

Observation data (J2000.0 epoch)
- Constellation: Leo
- Right ascension: 09^{h} 48^{m} 36.35^{s}
- Declination: +15° 48′ 13.37″
- Redshift: 0.334707
- Heliocentric radial velocity: 100,343 ± 21 km/s
- Distance: 4,842.4 ± 339.0 Mly (1,484.68 ± 103.93 Mpc)
- Group or cluster: WHL J094836.3+154813
- magnitude (J): 15.63
- magnitude (K): 14.96

Characteristics
- Type: FR I
- Size: ~743,000 ly (227.8 kpc) (estimated)

Other designations
- 2MASX J09483633+1548132, [LHC2018] J147.15141+15.80372, NVSS J094836+154812, TXS 0945+160, [YHW2016] J147.15141+15.80371, WHL J094836.3+154813 BCG, LEDA 3747350

SDSS J094836.34+154813.3 also known as [LHC2018] J147.15141+15.80372, is a radio galaxy located in the constellation of Leo. The redshift of the galaxy has been determined to be (z) 0.334.

== Description ==
SDSS J094836.34+154813.3 is an elliptical galaxy residing as the brightest cluster galaxy of the WHL J094836.3+154813 with 22 confirmed galaxy member candidates, but it does not belong to any superclusters. The R-band magnitude of the galaxy is 17.60 magnitude while the absolute magnitude is -23.64.

The central nucleus of the galaxy is active and it has been classified as a Fanaroff-Riley Class Type I radio galaxy with its total flux density calculated as 41.70 mJy by NRAO VLA Sky Survey (NVSS). The radio morphology is mainly elongated, depicted as a single elliptical profile component. There is a presence of a radio core with a core flux density of 37.69 mJy while the total radio emission flux is 42.70 mJy. The total radio power has been calculated to be 16.31 × 10^{24} WHz^{−1}.

A study found the total stellar mass of the galaxy is 11.32 M_{☉}. The log radio luminosity is 25.17 W Hz^{−1} while the radio flux density at 1.4 GHz frequencies is 41.7 mJy. The rest-frame r^{0.1} magnitude is -22.963. Evidence found the galaxy is powered by its own active galactic nucleus (AGN).
