= SDSS J1715+6008 =

Seyfert type 2 galaxy in the constellation Draco

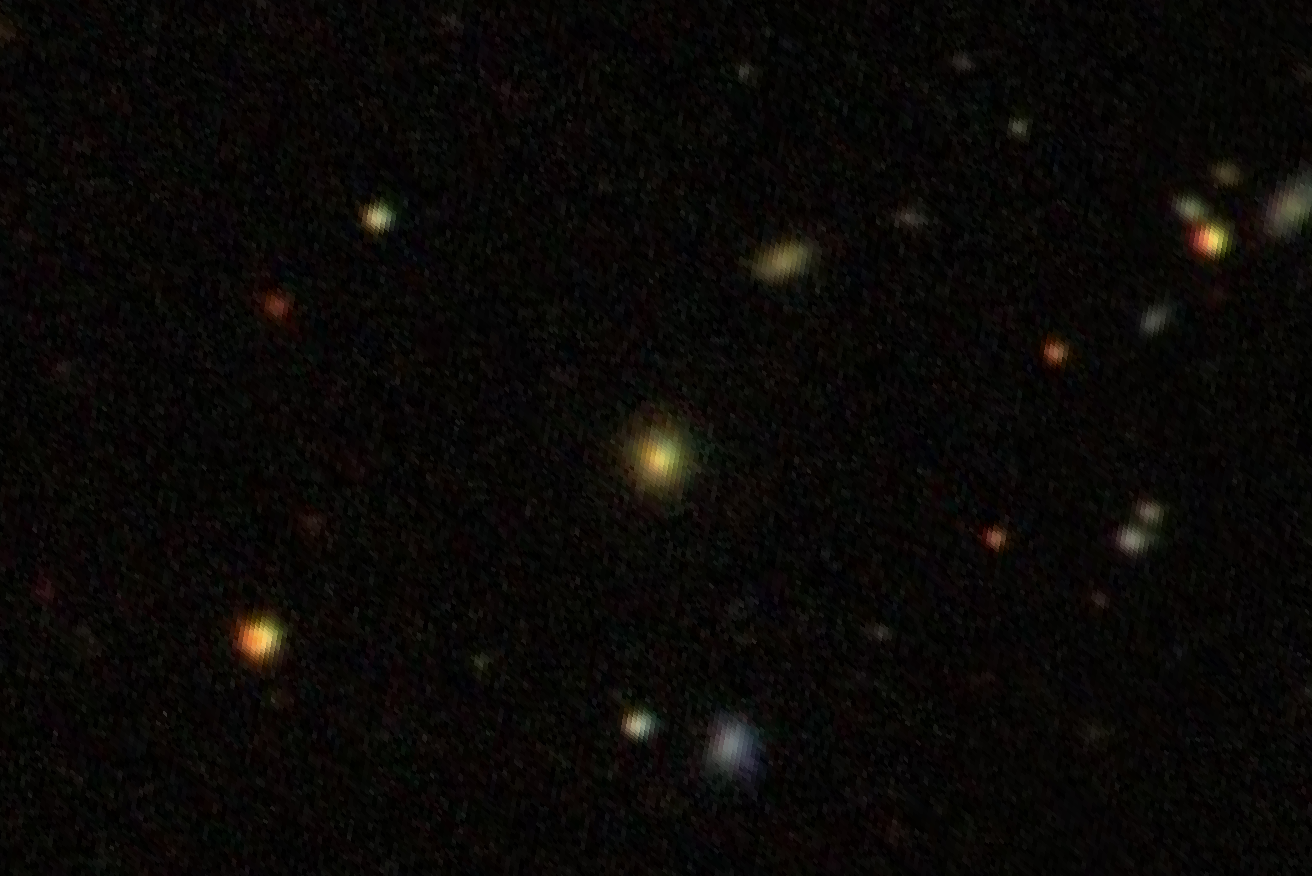
- The Seyfert 2 galaxy SDSS J1715+6008.

Observation data (J2000.0 epoch)
- Constellation: Draco
- Right ascension: 17^{h} 15^{m} 44.02^{s}
- Declination: +60° 08′ 35.50″
- Redshift: 0.156857
- Heliocentric radial velocity: 47,025 km/s ± 4
- Distance: 2.022 Gly
- Apparent magnitude (V): 18.66
- Apparent magnitude (B): 19.51

Characteristics
- Type: QSO2
- Size: ~137,600 ly (42.20 kpc) (estimated)

Other designations
- 1715+6011, 5MUSES 305, NVSS J171543+600833, LEDA 3137164, 2MASS J17154401+6008352, SDSS J171544.02+600835.4, QFeedS J1715+6008

SDSS J1715+6008 is an active Seyfert type 2 galaxy located in the constellation of Draco. The redshift of the galaxy is (z) 0.156 and it was first discovered as an astronomical radio source from the Faint Images of the Radio Sky at Twenty-Centimeters survey by astronomers in 1997. This galaxy is also known to host two active galactic nuclei (AGN) based on evidence of two X-ray sources, with a separation of 1.9 kiloparsecs from each other.

== Description ==
SDSS J1715+6008 is classified as both a radio-quiet (RQ) quasar and a doubly ionized oxygen (O II) emitter. Its host appears to have an undisturbed appearance based on Sloan Digital Sky Survey imaging, without any prominent companions or tidal features. This is somewhat unusual despite the presence of two binary black holes, although there are signs of weakly disturbed features located within its central regions. The black holes are estimated to have formed around 0.5 to 1 billion years ago and each has an estimated total mass of 7.2 × 10^{10} M_{☉}. The total [O II] luminosity of the black holes is approximately 3.6 × 10^{42} erg s^{−1}.

A study published in 2015 found interstellar gas in the form of a rotating disk which extends outwards by many kiloparsecs. The stellar line features are however in opposite directions, indicating bi-conical outflows. In its optical spectrum SDSS J1715+6008 displays several emission lines, with one of the peaks described as blueshifted, with its [O ii] peaks mainly separated by around 350 kilometers per seconds.

The radio structure of SDSS J1715+6008 is complex. Radio imaging made with the Very Large Array (VLA) has found there is a bright source in the center with extended radio emission. At 11.5 GHz frequencies the source is described as extended, with secondary peaks of emission located southwest from the nucleus, a resolved radio core and two flat spectrum regions. There is also a radio jet on one side. There is also evidence the ionized outflows are mainly driven by its own jet.
