= IRAS F11119+3257 =

Galaxy in the constellation Ursa Major

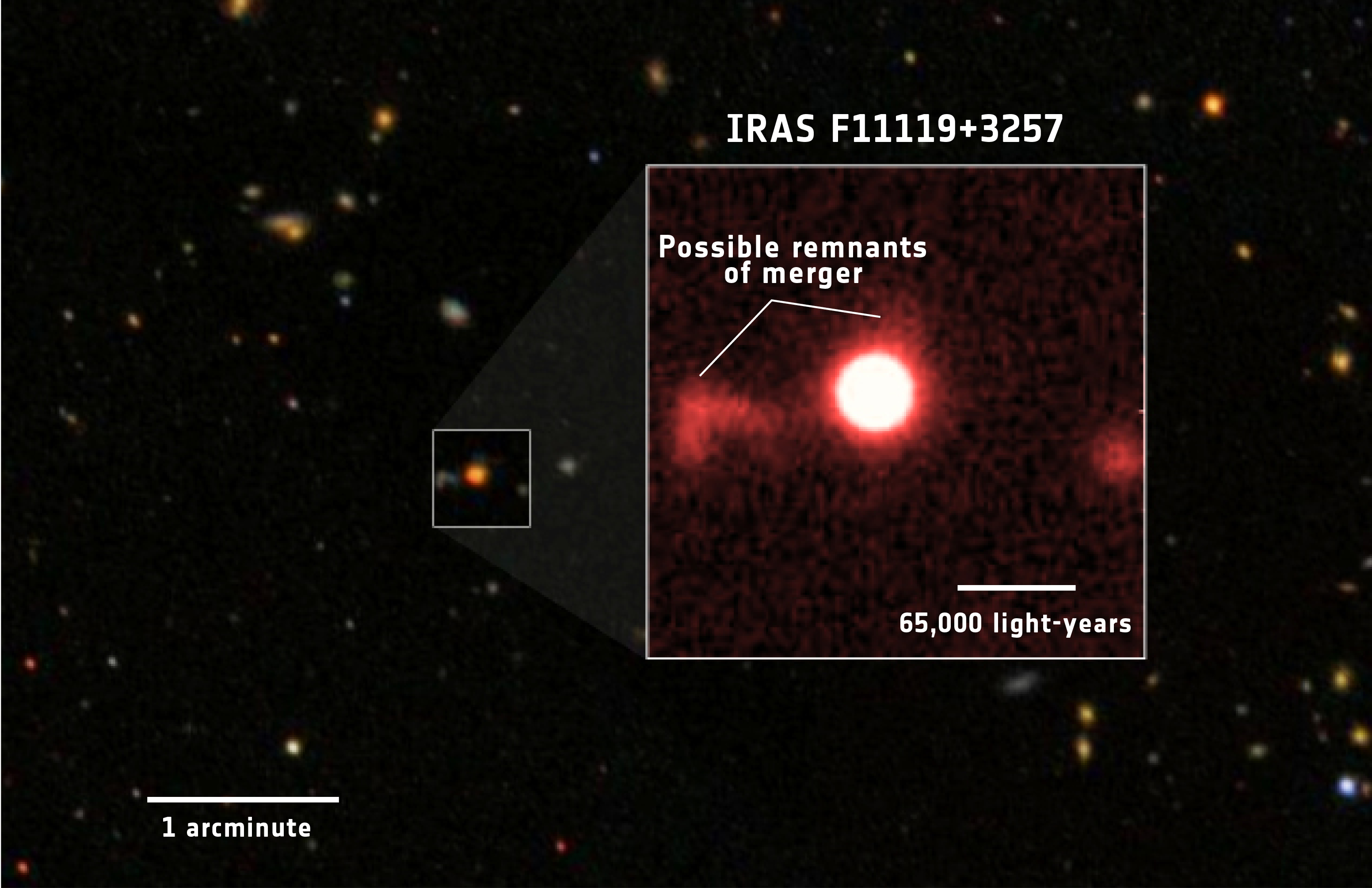
- The quasar IRAS F11119+3257

Observation data (J2000 epoch)
- Constellation: Ursa Major
- Right ascension: 11h 14m 38.91s
- Declination: +32d 41m 33.34s
- Redshift: 0.187580
- Heliocentric radial velocity: 56,235 km/s
- Distance: 2.519 Gly (772.3 Mpc)
- Apparent magnitude (V): 0.54
- Apparent magnitude (B): 0.43
- Surface brightness: 19.2

Characteristics
- Type: Sbrst; ULIRG, Sy1
- Apparent size (V): 0.13' x 0.10'
- Notable features: Luminous infrared galaxy

Other designations
- B2 1111+32, PGC 34264, F2M J111438.91+324133.29, NVSS J111438+324133, FIRST J111438.9+324133, IVS B1111+329

IRAS F11119+3257 or simply as F11119+3257, is a galaxy located in constellation Ursa Major. With a redshift of 0.187580, it has a light travel time distance of 2.5 billion light-years and is considered an ultraluminous infrared galaxy (ULIRG).

== Characteristics ==
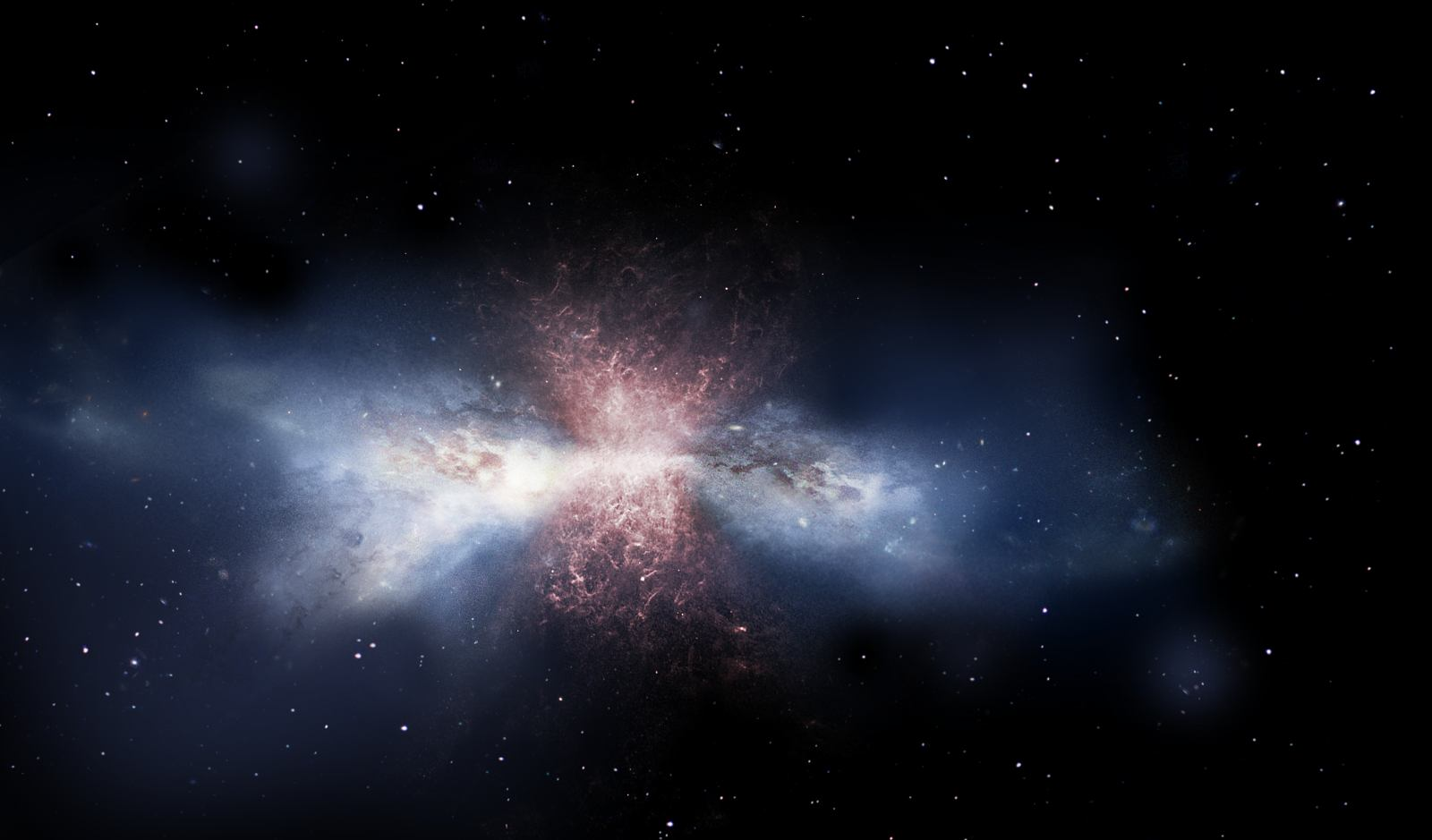
Artist's impression of strong galactic wind emitting out from supermassive black hole similar to IRAS F11119+3257

The nucleus of IRAS F11119+3257 is active. It has been classified as a narrow-line Seyfert 1 galaxy and has a post-merger morphology. It is also a categorized as type-1 quasar with fast outflows based on NuSTAR and Suzaku observations. The emission lines that contain high ionization levels are mainly dominated by blueshifted components.

The radio emission of IRAS F11119+3257, is dominated by its active galactic nucleus (AGN). There is an evidence of a central accretion disk. It is also found the galaxy has molecular outflow based on detections of both blue and redshifted wings in the CO(1–0) emission line profile. The estimated molecular mechanical outflow power is around 44.4 ± 0.5 erg s^{-1,} confirming only 2% of the total luminosity has been emitted out by its active galactic nucleus. The central supermassive black hole mass of the galaxy is 2 × 10^{7} solar masses. Apart from the molecular outflows, the galaxy exhibits X-ray emitting winds driven through radiation, suggesting its energy is conserved through quasar-mode feedback. Moreover the radio spectrum is peaked at 0.53 ± 0.06 GHz frequencies.

A two-sided radio jet has been discovered in IRAS F11119+3257 based on observations conducted in 2020. The jet is shown to have a separation gap of 200 parsecs in total and is found moving at fast speeds of 0.57c. Evidence also found it is a compact symmetrical object (CSO), depicted as unusual with a measured kinematic age of 6 x 10^{5} years.
