= WISEA J131142.45+563236.6 =

Radio galaxy in the constellation Ursa Major

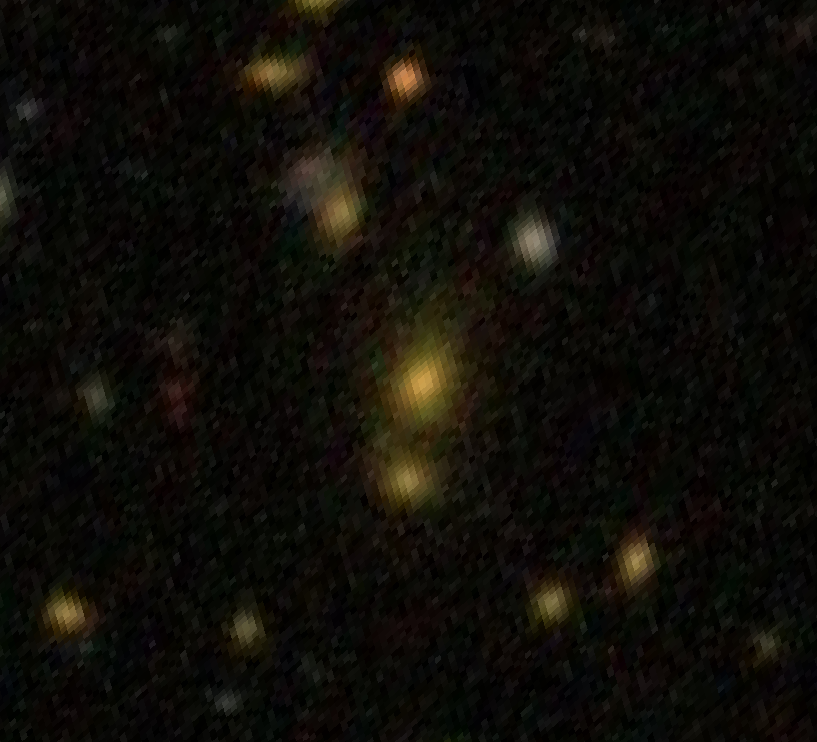
- SDSS image of WISEA J131142.45+563236.6

Observation data (J2000.0 epoch)
- Constellation: Ursa Major
- Right ascension: 13^{h} 11^{m} 42.45^{s}
- Declination: +56° 32′ 36.61″
- Redshift: 0.248274
- Heliocentric radial velocity: 74,431 ± 12 km/s
- Distance: 3,587.2 ± 251.1 Mly (1,099.84 ± 76.99 Mpc)
- Group or cluster: WHL J131142.5+563236
- magnitude (K): 14.93

Characteristics
- Type: BrClG
- Size: ~488,000 ly (149.5 kpc) (estimated)

Other designations
- 2MASX J13114252+5632361, ILT J131143.18+563232.8, LEDA 2540114, NVSS J131142+563236, RGZ J131142.4+563236, SDSS J131142.45+563236.2, WHL J131142.5+563236 BCG

WISEA J131142.45+563236.6 also known as RGZ J131142.4+563236, is a radio galaxy located in the constellation of Ursa Major. The redshift of the galaxy is estimated to be (z) 0.248 and it was first discovered in the Sixth Cambridge Survey of Radio Sources by astronomers in September 1990.

== Description ==
WISEA J131142.45+563236.6 is a red luminous galaxy residing as the brightest cluster galaxy of the WHL J131142.5+563236 galaxy cluster with 20 confirmed galaxy member candidates. The R-band magnitude of the galaxy is 17.85 while the R-band absolute magnitude of the galaxy is -22.69.

The nucleus is active and it has been classified as a wide angle-tail Fanaroff-Riley Class Type II radio galaxy. The radio jets are detected with the jets having an opening angle of 168.7° and curvature radius of 556.9 arcseconds. The largest known angular size of the source is 48 arcseconds while the largest linear size is 193.0 kiloparsecs. The spectral index of the source is 1.11α between 1.4 and 3 GHz frequencies. The radio power has been calculated to be 4.56 × 10^{24} WHz^{-1}.

A study found there are presence of two radio lobes. When observed, the lobes are found to have measured projected lengths of 72.1 and 102.5 kiloparsecs. The angular separation of the lobes are calculated to be 11.7 and 16.7 arcseconds from each other respectively. The total radio luminosity is 4.6 × 10^{24} W Hz^{-1} while the total radio flux density calculated by NRAO VLA Sky Survey (NVSS) is 24.3 mJy. The source is also bent with the bending angle measured to be 3.6° while the excess bending angle is -6.7°.

Evidence found the R-band luminosity of the galaxy is 4.81 × 10^{10} L_{ʘ}.
