= SDSS J081641.02+092332.5 =

Radio galaxy in the constellation Cancer

- DESI Legacy Surveys image of SDSS J081641.02+092332.5

Observation data (J2000.0 epoch)
- Constellation: Cancer
- Right ascension: 08^{h} 16^{m} 41.07^{s}
- Declination: +09° 23′ 32.52″
- Redshift: 0.255717
- Heliocentric radial velocity: 76,662 ± 14 km/s
- Distance: 3,700.1 ± 259.0 Mly (1,134.47 ± 79.41 Mpc)
- Group or cluster: WHL J081641.0+092332
- Magnitude (J): 15.50

Characteristics
- Type: E
- Size: ~889,000 ly (272.5 kpc) (estimated)

Other designations
- 2MASX J08164102+0923330, 2MASS J08164102+0923329, LEDA 1364446, [LHC2018] J124.17092+09.39237, NVSS J081641+092330, WHL J081641.0+092332 BCG, WISEA J081641.07+092332.5, [YHW2016] J124.17091+09.39236

SDSS J081641.02+092332.5 also known as [YHW2016] J124.17091+09.39236, is a radio galaxy located in the constellation of Cancer. The redshift of the galaxy is found to be (z) 0.255.

== Description ==
SDSS J081641.02+092332.5 is an elliptical galaxy residing as the brightest cluster galaxy of the WHL J081641.0+092332 galaxy cluster with 47 confirmed galaxy members. The R-band magnitude of the galaxy has been calculated to be 16.06 magnitude while its absolute magnitude is -24.63.

The nucleus is active and it has been categorized as a non-bent Fanaroff-Riley Class Type I radio galaxy with its total flux density of 19.80 mJy by NRAO VLA Sky Survey (NVSS). The radio morphology of the source is elongated, mainly described as a single elliptical profile component. There is a presence of a detected radio core with its total core flux density calculated to be 17.42 mJy and has a total radio emission flux density of 19.60 mJy. The total radio power of the source is found to be 3.94 × 10^{24} WHz^{−1}.

A study found the total stellar mass of the galaxy is 11.59 M_{☉}. The log radio luminosity is found to be 24.58 W Hz^{−1} whereas the total flux density at 1.4 GHz is 19.8 mJy. The rest frame r^{0.1} magnitude is estimated to be -23.42. Evidence found the source is mainly powered by its own AGN (active galactic nucleus).
