= OJ 508 =

Quasar in the constellation of Lynx

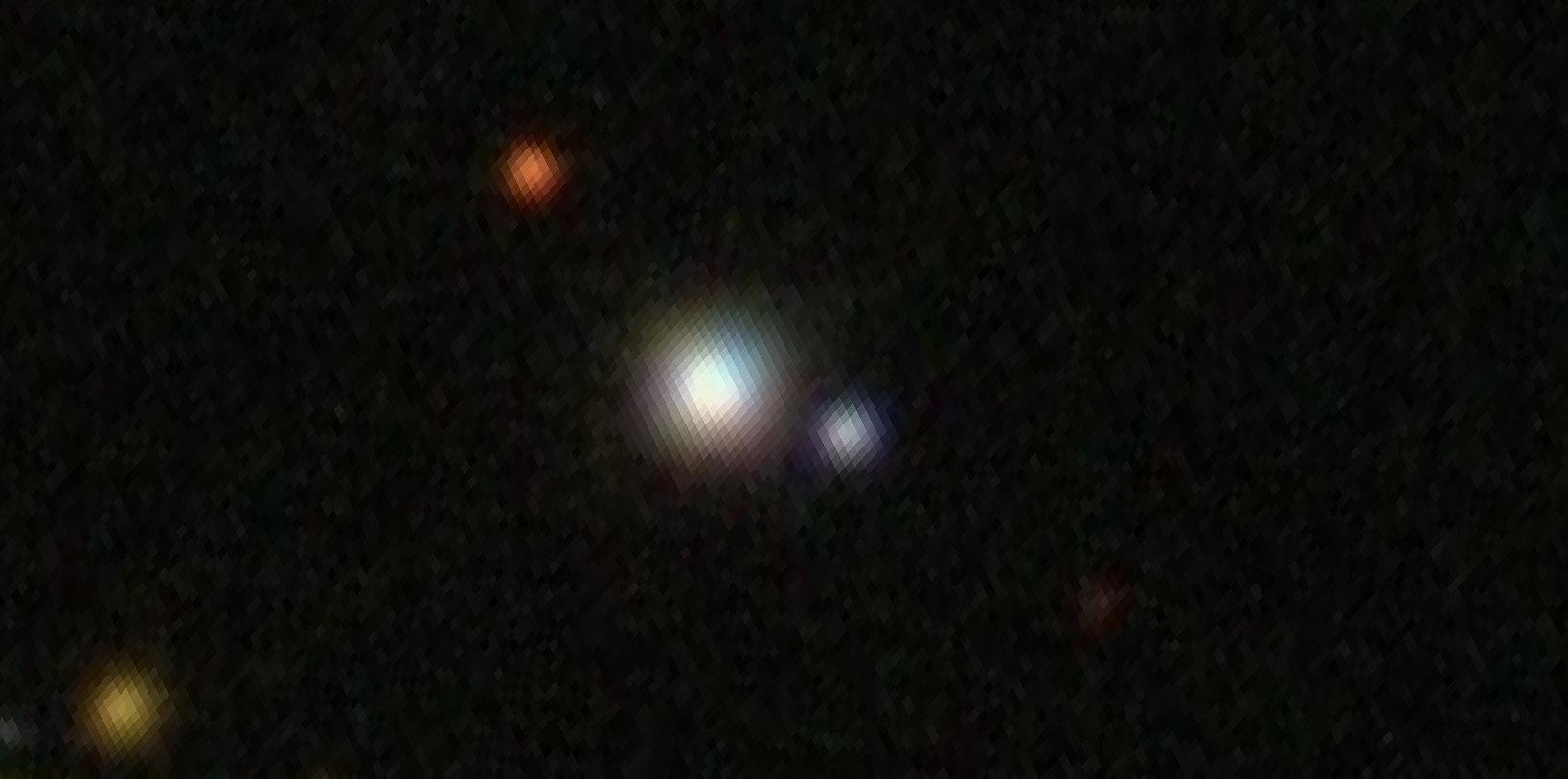
- SDSS image of OJ 508

Observation data (J2000.0 epoch)
- Constellation: Lynx
- Right ascension: 08^{h} 08^{m} 39.66^{s}
- Declination: +49° 50′ 36.53″
- Redshift: 1.434400
- Heliocentric radial velocity: 430,022 km/s
- Distance: 9.355 Gly
- Apparent magnitude (V): 19.18
- Apparent magnitude (B): 19.55

Characteristics
- Type: blazar; HPQ FSRQ
- Size: ~170,000 ly (52 kpc) (estimated)

Other designations
- SDSS J080839.56+495036.5, LEDA 2355150, BP 71, INTREF 344, QSO B0804+599, GB1 0805+500, FIRST J080839.6+495036

OJ 508 also known as SBS 0804+499, is a quasar located in the constellation of Lynx. The redshift of the quasar is estimated to be (z) 1.434 and it was first discovered as an astronomical radio source in 1981 by astronomers. The radio spectrum of the quasar is estimated to be flat, making it a flat-spectrum radio quasar.

== Description ==
The radio source of OJ 508 is compact. When observed with Very Long Baseline Interferometry (VLBI), the source has an asymmetrical complicated radio structure made up of an unresolved component and weak extended structure that is located in the southeast region. Further observations found there are multiple components displaying superluminal motion. In addition, the quasar has a broad radio jet travelling southeast from east direction, reaching about one to three milliarcseconds. Imaging made at 22 Hz, showed this jet has a twisted appearance. The radio core of the quasar is only 0.15 milliarcseconds in extent, with the presence of extended radio emission east.

OJ 508 is described as a highly polarized quasar (HPQ). The quasar has polarization levels ranging between 8.6% up to 11.3%. It is variable on a short measured timescale which lasted around 22 days. An outburst was detected from the quasar, beginning in 1997 and ending at the end of the monitoring period. The modulation index of the quasar was observed rising 18% at various wavelengths before declining 14% when observed at 1.3 centimeter wavelengths. High amplitude variability was observed, increasing to 35% in April 1990.

The host galaxy of OJ 508 has been classified as unresolved, but has a faint tidal tail extension that is expanding by 3.5 arcseconds north from the quasar, and also in off-center direction. This is possibly a recent sign of a tidal interaction. Later, when observed in 2010, it was found the disturbed morphology of the quasar isn't related to any interactions. A faint galaxy is 10 arcseconds away from the quasar.
