= NGC 6263 =

Galaxy in the constellation Hercules

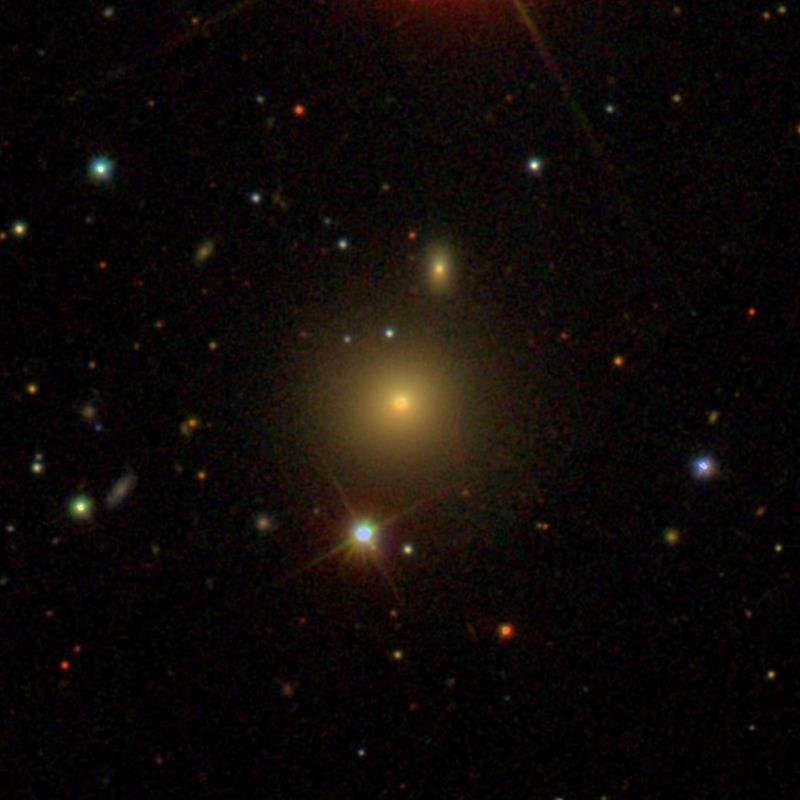
- SDSS image of NGC 6263

Observation data (J2000 epoch)
- Constellation: Hercules
- Right ascension: 16^{h} 56^{m} 43.239^{s}
- Declination: +27° 49′ 19.96″
- Redshift: 0.034541±0.000120 km/s
- Distance: 473.9 million light years (118.03 Mpc)
- Apparent magnitude (V): 14.1

Characteristics
- Type: E
- Size: 124,000 light years
- Apparent size (V): 0.843′ × 0.742′

Other designations
- LEDA 59292, UZC J165643.2+274919, AWM 5-4, 2MASX J16564323+2749199, Z 1654.7+2754, FBQS J1656+2749, MCG+05-40-008, Z 169-14, FIRST J165643.1+274919, NPM1G +27.0546, GIN 627, UGC 10618

NGC 6263 is an elliptical galaxy in the constellation Hercules. It was discovered by Albert Marth on June 28, 1864.
