= 3C 223 =

Galaxy in the constellation Leo Minor

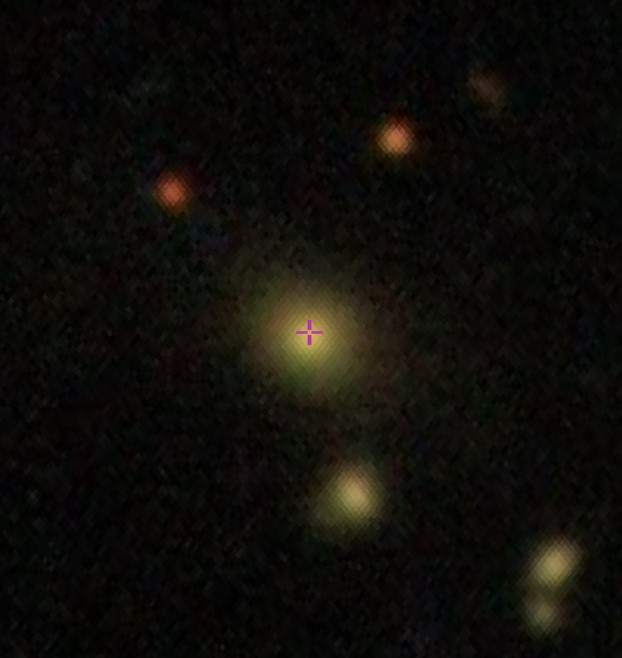
- The galaxy 3C 223

Observation data (Epoch J2000)
- Constellation: Leo Minor
- Right ascension: 09^{h} 39^{m} 52.761^{s}
- Declination: +35° 53′ 58.91″
- Redshift: 0.136730
- Distance: 549 Mpc (1.79 billion ly) h^{−1}_{0.73}
- Type: Sy2, Rad, AGN, G, QSO, X, gam G
- Apparent magnitude (V): 18.60

Other designations
- DA 269, LEDA 27575, 4C 36.16, QSO B0936+361

3C 223 is a Seyfert galaxy located in the constellation of Leo Minor. It hosts a Type 2 quasar nucleus, found to be radio-loud with a rare, Compton-thick active galactic nucleus.

3C 223 is also a radio galaxy. With a projected size of ≥1 megaparsecs, it is classified a giant radio source according to researchers who presented Very Large Array images. Based on spectral study results, the source of 3C 223 is found to be younger.

== Gallery ==
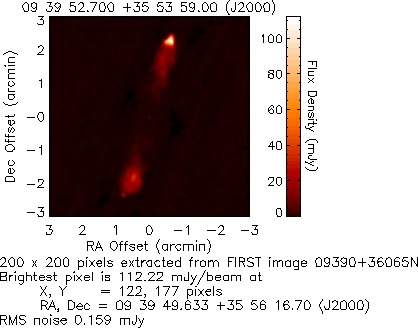
3C 223 by Faint Images of the Radio Sky at Twenty-Centimeters

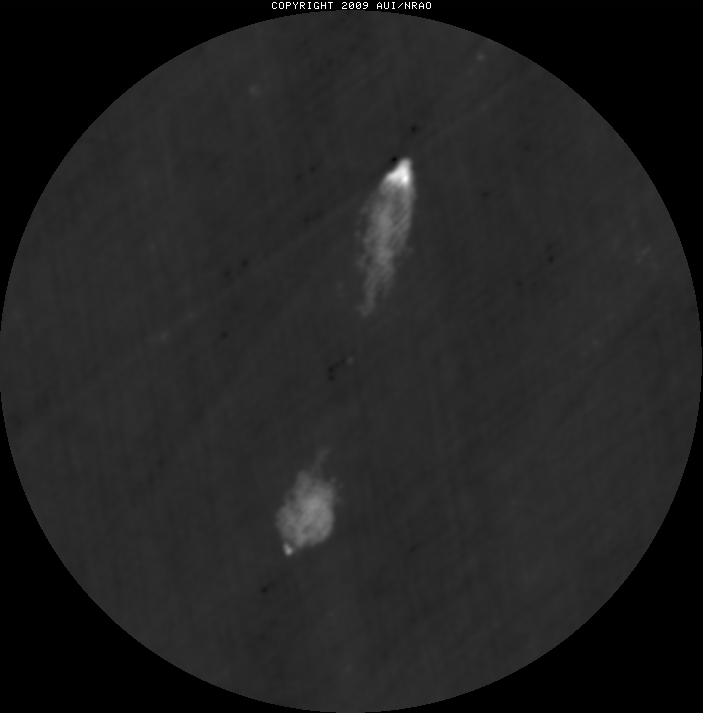
3C 223 observed in radiowaves
