= Faint Images of the Radio Sky at Twenty-Centimeters =

Astronomical survey

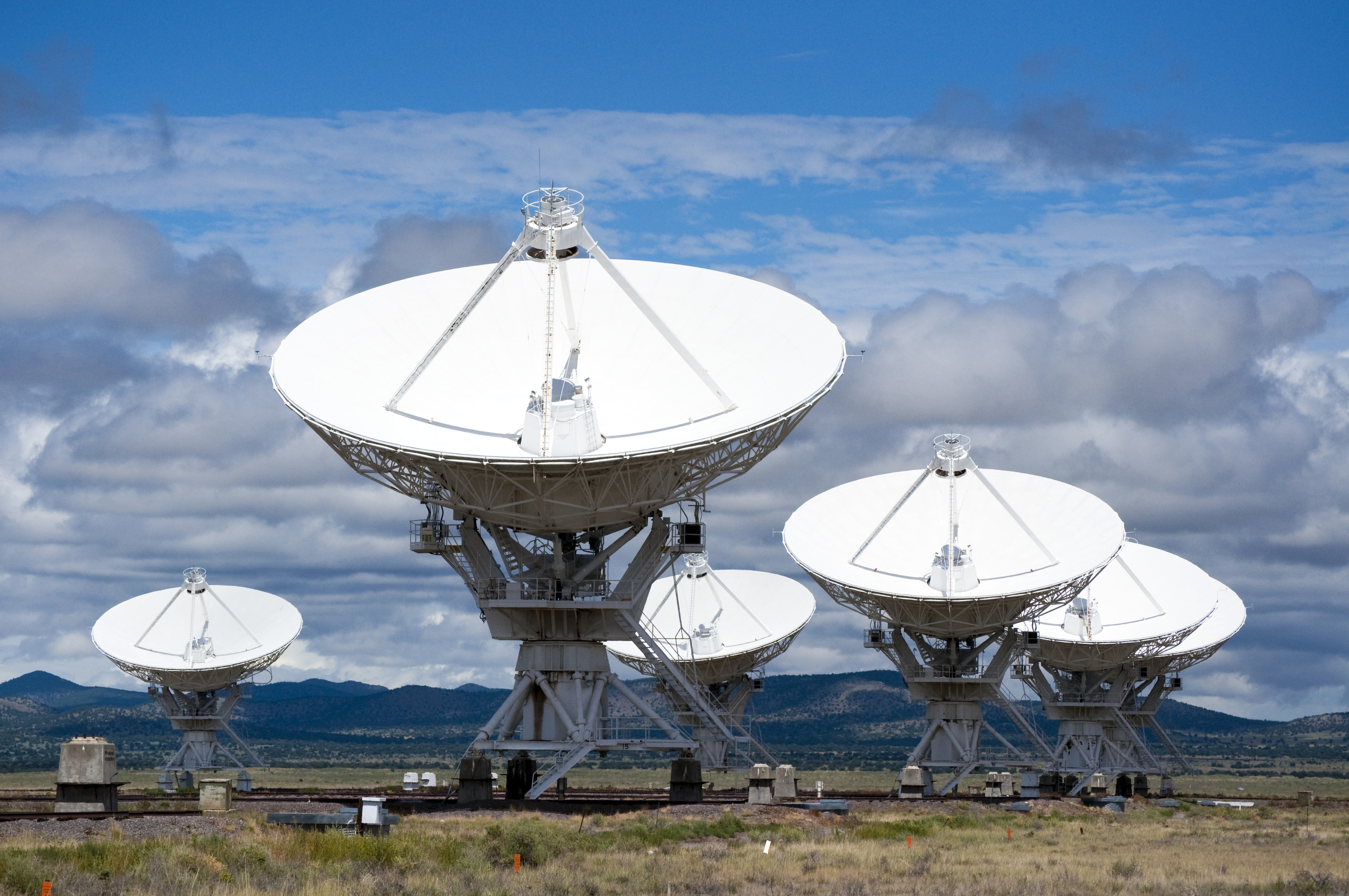
- Part of the Karl G. Jansky Very Large Array
- Alternative names: FIRST
- Started: 1993
- Ended: 2011
- Wavelength: 20 centimetre
- Website: sundog.stsci.edu

Faint Images of the Radio Sky at Twenty-Centimeters, or FIRST, was an astronomical survey of the Northern Hemisphere carried out by the Very Large Array. It was led by Robert H. Becker, Richard L. White, and David J. Helfand, who came up with the idea for the survey after they had completed the VLA Galactic Plane survey in 1990, as well as Michael D. Gregg and Sally A. Laurent-Muehleisen. The survey was started 50 years after the first systematic survey of the radio sky was completed by Grote Reber in April 1943.

== Survey ==
The survey covers 10,575 square degrees, around 25% of the sky, with regions centred on the North and South Galactic poles. The regions were chosen so that they would also be covered by the Sloan Digital Sky Survey (SDSS) in 5 optical bands, and the survey was comparable to the Palomar Observatory Sky Survey in terms of resolution and sensitivity.

The observations were made in 'B' configuration at a wavelength of 20 centimetres (1,500 MHz) (in the L Band), with an angular resolution of 5 arcsecond. It was proposed at the same time as the NRAO VLA Sky Survey, and trial observations for both surveys were taken in 1992. Survey observations of the North Galactic pole started in 1993, with 144 hours of observing time in April and May 1993 for test observations and the initial survey strip of 300 square degrees, producing an initial catalogue of 28,000 sources. Survey observations continued until 2004. Observations of the South Galactic pole were made in 2009 and 2011; the 2011 observations used the EVLA. The target flux density limit was 1 milliJansky, with an <0.15mJy r.m.s. noise limit.

The survey data was analysed using an automated pipeline through the Astronomical Image Processing System. Images and catalogues from the survey were made available after quality checks, without a proprietary period. Several versions of the survey catalogue have been generated, with the first published in 1997, and the latest (as of 2017) published in December 2014. The catalogue includes over 70,000 cross-identifications with SDSS and the Two Micron All Sky Survey (2MASS). The expectation was that $10^6$ radio sources would be observed and 65,000 images produced by the survey; the 2014 catalogue included 946,432 sources. Sources in the catalogue follow a naming convention comprising the survey name and source coordinate with the format "FIRST Jhhmmss.s+ddmmss"; the convention is registered with the International Astronomical Union.

== Science ==
The resolution of the survey was chosen so that optical counterparts to the radio sources could be identified; complex radio sources with multiple components could be resolved (to avoid optical misidentifications); and radio morphology (e.g., Fanaroff-Riley classification) could be identified. The survey aimed to contribute to science on quasars and active galaxies; galaxy evolution; galactic astronomy; the large-scale structure of the Universe; and dark matter. The survey produced a series of papers. The survey paper has been referenced by over 1,600 other scientific publications.

The survey sources were cross-matched with the Palomar Sky Survey to create the FIRST Bright Quasar Survey (FBQS), which comprised quasar candidates that were then followed up with optical spectroscopy. The initial survey found 69 quasars, with 51 being newly identified. A number of broad absorption line quasars were discovered by FIRST. Other, high-redshift quasars were identified in the survey by cross-matching with SDSS.

Variability was detected in over 1600 sources during the course of the survey, including stars, pulsars, galaxies, quasars, and unidentified radio sources. On large scales, the two-point correlation function between radio galaxies was observed.
