= NRAO VLA Sky Survey =

Astronomical survey

- Website: www.cv.nrao.edu/nvss/

The NRAO VLA Sky Survey (NVSS) was an astronomical survey of the Northern Hemisphere carried out by the Very Large Array (VLA) of the National Radio Astronomy Observatory (NRAO), resulting in an astronomical catalogue. It was led by James J. Condon.

The survey covers 82% sky, consisting of everything north of declination -40 degrees. The observations were made in 'D' and 'DnC' configuration at 1.4 gigahertz (21 cm), with an angular resolution of 45 arcsec. It was proposed at the same time as the Faint Images of the Radio Sky at Twenty-Centimeters, and test observations for both surveys were taken in 1992. Observations were made between September 1993 and October 1996.

The Southern Hemisphere was covered by a similar catalogue called the Sydney University Molonglo Sky Survey (SUMSS), generated using the Molonglo Observatory Synthesis Telescope.
