= QSO B1150+812 =

Quasar in the constellation of Camelopardalis

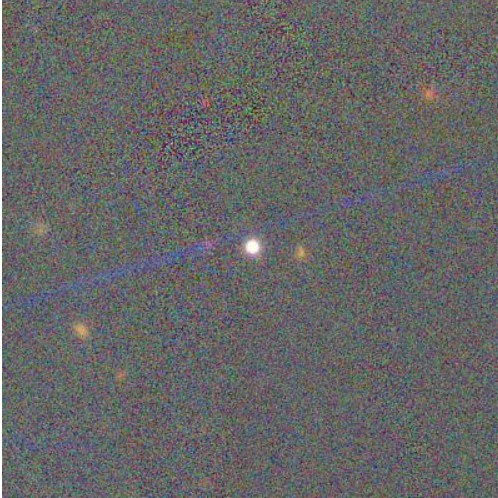
- The quasar QSO B1150+812.

Observation data (J2000.0 epoch)
- Constellation: Camelopardalis
- Right ascension: 11^{h} 5312.499^{m}
- Declination: +80° 58′ 29.154″
- Redshift: 1.247660
- Heliocentric radial velocity: 374,039 km/s
- Distance: 8.380 Gly
- Apparent magnitude (V): 19.40

Characteristics
- Type: LPQ, FSRQ

Other designations
- 8C 1150+812, S5 1150+81, 2MASS J11531268+8058293, VLSS J1153.2+8058, 6C B115021.1+811507, WMAP 078, 1150+812

QSO B1150+812 is a quasar located in the constellation of Camelopardalis. It has a redshift of (z) 1.25 and it was first discovered in 1983 as an astronomical radio source by astronomers during the 5 GHz S5 survey. This object also has a radio spectrum described as flat, making it a flat-spectrum radio source.

== Description ==
The source of QSO B1150+812 is found to be compact. It has a core-jet structure described as one-sided, based on radio mapping taken by Very Long Baseline Array. The radio emission of the source is heavily concentrated within the region of the radio core measuring 0.3 milliarcseconds in extent, contributing most of the flux density at 15.4 GHz. Earlier observations conducted in 1987, showed the source has two major components; mainly a northern unresolved component and a southern elongated component displaying a slight extension towards southeast. Evidence showed the gaps of the two components are separating by 0.12 milliarcseconds per year indicating superluminal expansion.

The jet of QSO B1150+812 is described showing superluminal motion and orientating in a southwards direction from the core by 5 milliarcseconds. A polarization map at 7.9 GHz frequencies, described the jet's electric vector position angle as roughly perpendicular but offset towards the western edge of the jet, hinting a longitudinal magnetic field.

A rapid polarization swing at 180 degrees, was observed from the quasar by astronomers. During the swing at between 20 and 25 hours, it was noted the flux density was minimum with a decreased flux densities of 60 mJy at a 1 hour time scale. Based from observation results, astronomers suggested the swing was caused by the occultation of two polarized components via interstellar clouds. This theory might be explained by refractive focusing.
