= J1017+6352 =

Radio galaxy in the constellation of Ursa Major

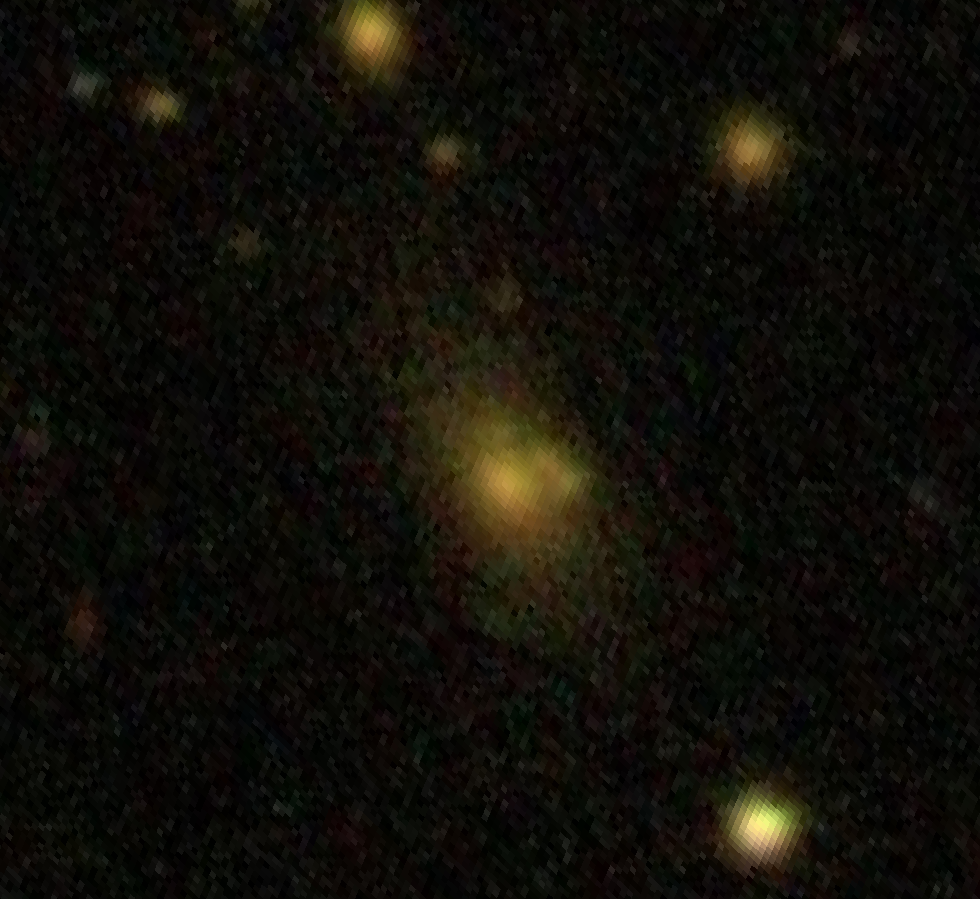
- SDSS image of J1017+6352

Observation data (J2000.0 epoch)
- Constellation: Ursa Major
- Right ascension: 10^{h} 18^{m} 01.88^{s}
- Declination: +63° 52′ 29.97″
- Redshift: 0.233601
- Heliocentric radial velocity: 70,032 ± 11 km/s
- Distance: 3,374.5 ± 236.2 Mly (1,034.64 ± 72.43 Mpc)
- Group or cluster: GMBCG J154.50781+63.87501
- magnitude (H): 14.08

Characteristics
- Type: BrClG
- Size: ~734,000 ly (225.1 kpc) (estimated)

Other designations
- 2MASX J10180179+6352298, 6C B101426.7+640729, LEDA 2662035, 8C 1014+641, GMBCG J154.50781+63.87501 BCG, NYU-VAGC 0205375, [YHW2016] J154.50780+63.87508, NVSS J101801+635227, [SBP2022] J1017+6352, TXS 1014+641

J1017+6352, also known as J101801.6+635228 and NYU-VAGC 0205375, is a radio galaxy located in the constellation of Ursa Major. The redshift of the galaxy is (z) 0.233 and it was first discovered in the Sixth Cambridge Survey of Radio Sources by astronomers in February 1990.

== Description ==
J1017+6352 is a red luminous galaxy, residing as the brightest cluster galaxy (BCG) of the galaxy cluster, GMBCG J154.50781+63.87501. It is also classified as an elliptical galaxy with an r-band absolute magnitude of -23.73. The stellar velocity dispersion of the galaxy is estimated to be 261 kilometers per second and the galaxy's effective radius is 18.4 kiloparsecs. The physical size of the galaxy is 160 kiloparsecs. The g–r color value is 1.42 magnitude.

The nucleus is active and it is classified as a narrow-angle tail Fanaroff-Riley Class Type II radio galaxy. The galaxy contains a radio source with a radio power of 36.01 × 10^{24} W Hz^{−1}. The total flux density of the source at 1400 MHz frequencies is estimated to be 222 mJy, while at 150 MHz the flux density is 1349 mJy. The spectral index of the source is -0.81α between 1400 and 150 MHz.

It is also a C-shaped radio galaxy, with the extent of the source being only 0.09 megaparsecs in total, making the source small. The total radio luminosity at 1.4 GHz is 25.56 W Hz^{−1}.

A study published in 2025, reclassified it as a bent wide-angle tail (WAT) Fanaroff-Riley Class Type I radio galaxy characterized by its bent radio lobes. There is a radio jet with an opening angle of 105.7°, and the curvature of the jet is 18.2 arcseconds. The largest known angular size of the galaxy is 56 arcseconds, and the largest known linear size is 215 kiloparsecs.
