= 4C +72.26 =

Radio galaxy in the constellation Draco

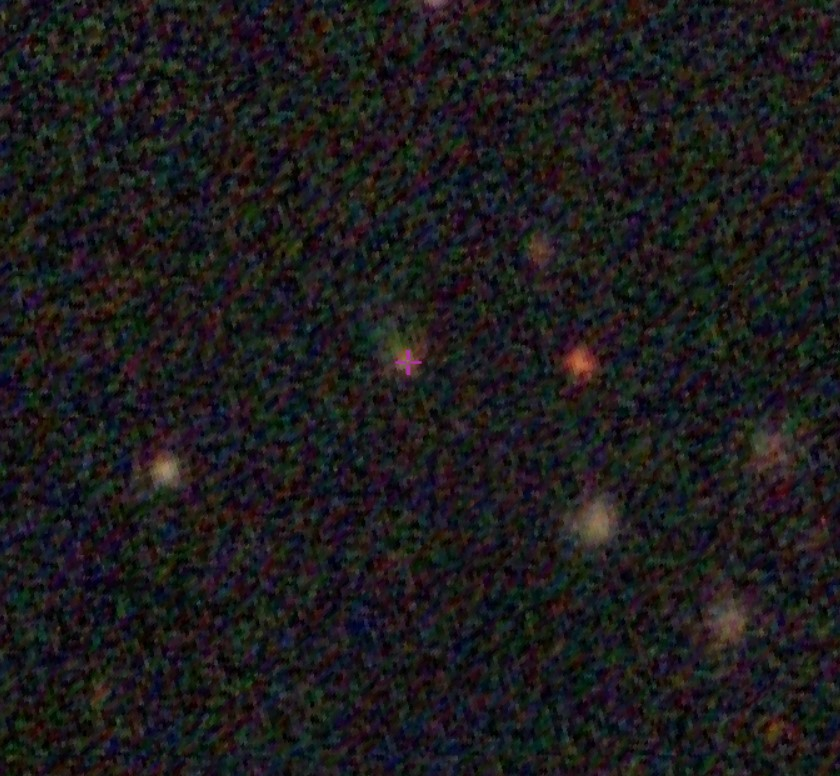
- 4C +72.26 captured by Pan-STARRS

Observation data (J2000.0 epoch)
- Constellation: Draco
- Right ascension: 19h 08m 23.90s
- Declination: +72d 20m 04.90s
- Redshift: 3.536000
- Heliocentric radial velocity: 1,060,066 km/s
- Distance: 11.526 Gly (light travel time distance)
- Apparent magnitude (V): 0.436
- Apparent magnitude (B): 0.577
- Surface brightness: 21.4

Characteristics
- Type: HzRG
- Notable features: Radio galaxy, interacting galaxy

Other designations
- PGC 2821855, 6C 1909+72, NVSS J190823+722009, 8C J1908+722, WN B1909.1+7215, 2CXO J190823.2+722005, NAME TX J1908+7220

4C +72.26 known as NAME TX J1908+7220, is a radio galaxy located in the constellation Draco. At the redshift of 3.53, the galaxy is located roughly 11.5 billion light-years from Earth.

== Characteristics ==
4C +72.26 is one of the high redshift powerful radio galaxies. An interacting pair of two vigorous starburst galaxies separated by ~1300 ± 200 km s^{−1} in velocity, 4C +72.26 is known to have tight locus following in the K-band Hubble diagram, suggesting it as a luminous (~3L*) galaxy with stellar populations forming rapidly at a very high redshift and such, evolved passively.

4C +72.26 is a massive galaxy lying inside the center of a galaxy cluster where galaxy formation is regulated and through growth by heating the intracluster medium. Energy that is released from the continued accretion of material, is then fueled towards its central supermassive black hole.

The molecular gas is known to end up between two colliding galaxies which displays absorption line profiles like P Cygni, while the active galactic nucleus host shows Lyα emission that indicative of a galaxy-wide "superwind". Moreover, the host is found to have a luminous highly ionized outflow. Despite showing a strong massive starburst, the ultraviolet-mid-infrared spectral energy distribution in 4C +72.26 is found to have a pre-existing stellar population that comprises ~1012 Msolar of stellar mass, with further ~2 per cent contributed by the current burst. This suggests that 4C +72.26 has assembled most of its final stellar mass.

4C +72.26 is classified as a broad absorption-line radio galaxy with strong mid-infrared continua observed through spectrograph observations from Spitzer Telescope, according to research conducted by Dey in 1999, similar to those of broad absorption-line quasars with C IV trough extending bluewards to ~7000 km s^{−1}.

With an upper spectrum appearing similar to the long-slit spectrum that is presented, the galaxy also have wavelength coverage up to ~8400 Å. Besides the narrow emission lines of Lyα and He II, several deep broad absorption troughs are seen, with sharper absorption features shortward of the predicted wavelengths that is O I_{1302} and C II_{1335} similar to 4C +41.17 and NGC 1741, a star-forming galaxy.
