= 3C 173.1 =

Radio galaxy in the constellation of Camelopardalis

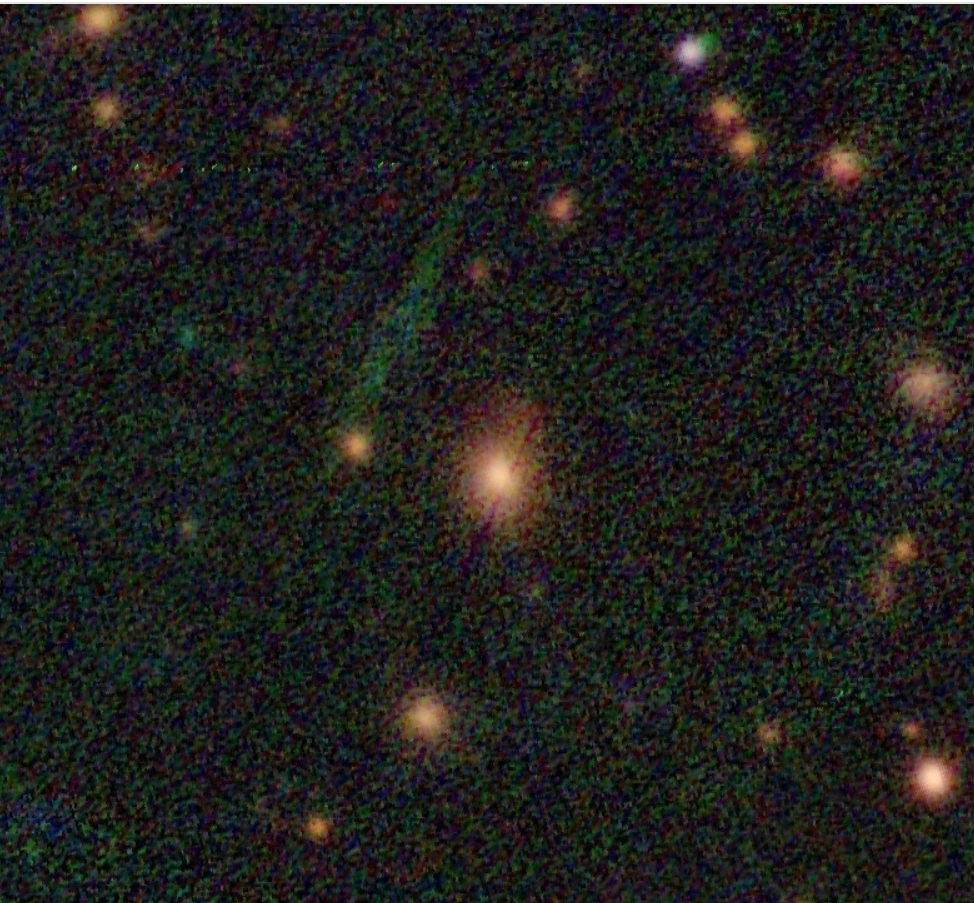
- Pan-STARRS image of 3C 173.1

Observation data (J2000.0 epoch)
- Constellation: Camelopardalis
- Right ascension: 07^{h} 09^{m} 18.17^{s}
- Declination: +74° 49′ 31.76″
- Redshift: 0.222900
- Heliocentric radial velocity: 66,824 km/s
- Distance: 2.756 Gly
- Apparent magnitude (B): 19.98

Characteristics
- Type: NLRG LEG
- Size: ~265,000 ly (81.2 kpc) (estimated)

Other designations
- 4C +74.12, 2MASX J07091812+7449318, LEDA 2821895, 6C B070247.6+745415, 8C 0702+749, NRAO 0255, 2CXO J070918.0+744931

3C 173.1 is a radio galaxy located in the northern constellation of Camelopardalis. The redshift of the galaxy is (z) 0.222 and it was first recorded as an astronomical radio source in the Third Cambridge Catalogue of Radio Sources survey in 1962. In April 1965 the source was linked to an optical counterpart.

== Description ==
3C 173.1 is classified as a weak-line, low-excitation Fanaroff-Riley Class Type 2 radio galaxy with a steep spectrum radio source. The host galaxy is an elliptical galaxy located inside a poor galaxy cluster, with a slightly boxy shaped appearance. A low-surface brightness component of asymmetric widths is found in the northwest direction from the galaxy, indicating a recent galaxy merger.

Imaging with the Hubble Space Telescope (HST) showed the galaxy's nucleus is partly obscured by a dust lane. The dust morphology of the galaxy is described having offset dust filaments with faint tendrils. The total star formation rate of the galaxy is 61.0+11.0
−12.0×10^{10} M_{☉} and it has a supermassive black hole mass of 120.1+84.8
−52.2×10^{7} M_{☉} based on a host-fit parameter measurement by the Herschel Space Telescope.

The radio structure of the galaxy is complex. When imaged with the Very Large Array (VLA) at high resolutions it has a hotspot located in the northern direction that is made up of three individual components; mainly the compact western component, a faint secondary less compact component and a diffused component. A bridge of radio emission is seen linking the hotspot and the radio lobe. The hotspot in the southern direction is also made up of various components, with a curved ridge of radio emission in the west. Low resolution imaging found a jet in the northern lobe, obscured by a high surface brightness area.

Recent VLA observations made in 2014 have described the lobes as asymmetrically placed. When observed, the northern lobe is found to have a series of features on its northern edge with an edged hotspot. The southern lobe imaged at 0.33 arcsecond resolution on the other hand, has flat edges with a recessed hotspot feature. A binary supermassive black hole might well be present inside the galaxy.
