= WN B1851+5707 =

Radio galaxy in the constellation Draco

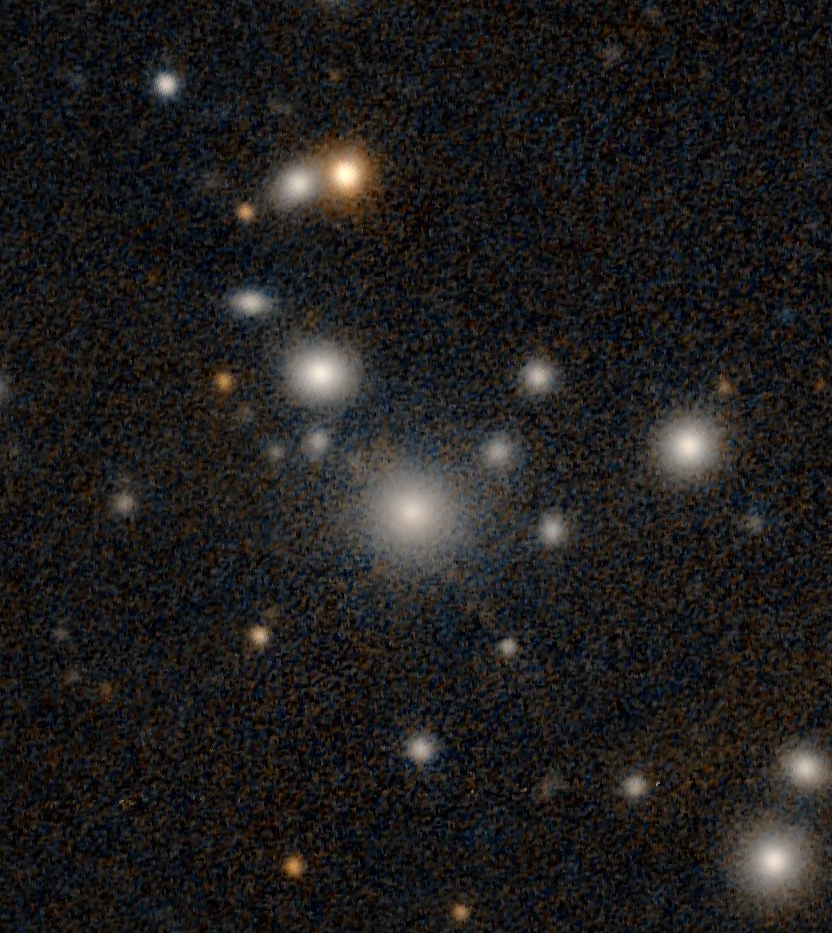
- Pan-STARRS image of WN B1851+5707

Observation data (J2000.0 epoch)
- Constellation: Draco
- Right ascension: 18^{h} 52^{m} 08.56^{s}
- Declination: +57° 11′ 42.50″
- Redshift: 0.107035
- Heliocentric radial velocity: 32,088 ± 0 km/s
- Distance: 1,554.1 ± 108.8 Mly (476.48 ± 33.35 Mpc)
- magnitude (J): 13.76

Characteristics
- Type: USS
- Size: ~239,000 ly (73.3 kpc) (estimated)

Other designations
- 2MASX J18520859+5711430, 6C B185115.2+570808, LEDA 2559680, 8C 1851+571, NVSS J185208+571142, RX J1852.1+5711:[HDH2012] BCG, WN B1851+5707:[MPM2011] a

WN B1851+5707 also known as WN B1851+5707a, is a radio galaxy located in the constellation of Draco. The redshift of the object is (z) 0.107 and it was first discovered by astronomers in November 1998 from the WENSS survey where they classified it as an elliptical galaxy without the presence of any emission lines in its optical spectrum.

== Description ==
WN B1851+5707 is categorized as a dying radio galaxy located at the center of a cool core galaxy cluster, RX J1852.1+5711. Radio imaging made with the Very Large Array (VLA) found it is actually made up of two separate radio sources called WN B1851+5707a and WN B1851+5707b, associated with this object and another dying radio galaxy. The main source (WN B1851+5707a) has an ultra steep radio spectrum with a compact and luminous appearance. The spectral index of the source is found to be 1.7α and the total flux density is 53.3 mJy at 1.4 GHz frequencies. A total radio power at 151 MHz is calculated as 10^{25.3} W Hz^{−1}.

There is a point-like source positioned in the center of the galaxy with radio flux originating from within an extended structure, making it a de-energized source. It has a shapeless appearance and is asymmetric. The total linear size is estimated to be 30 × 15 kiloparsecs. There are no signs of any radio jets categorized as active. A study published in 2011, has found the radio lobes ejected from the galaxy have a total radio luminosity of 1.8 × 10^{25} W/Hz and a spectra index of 0.7α. No evidence of X-ray cavities were associated with the lobes.
