= SDSS J102709.94+390805.1 =

Radio galaxy in the constellation Leo Minor

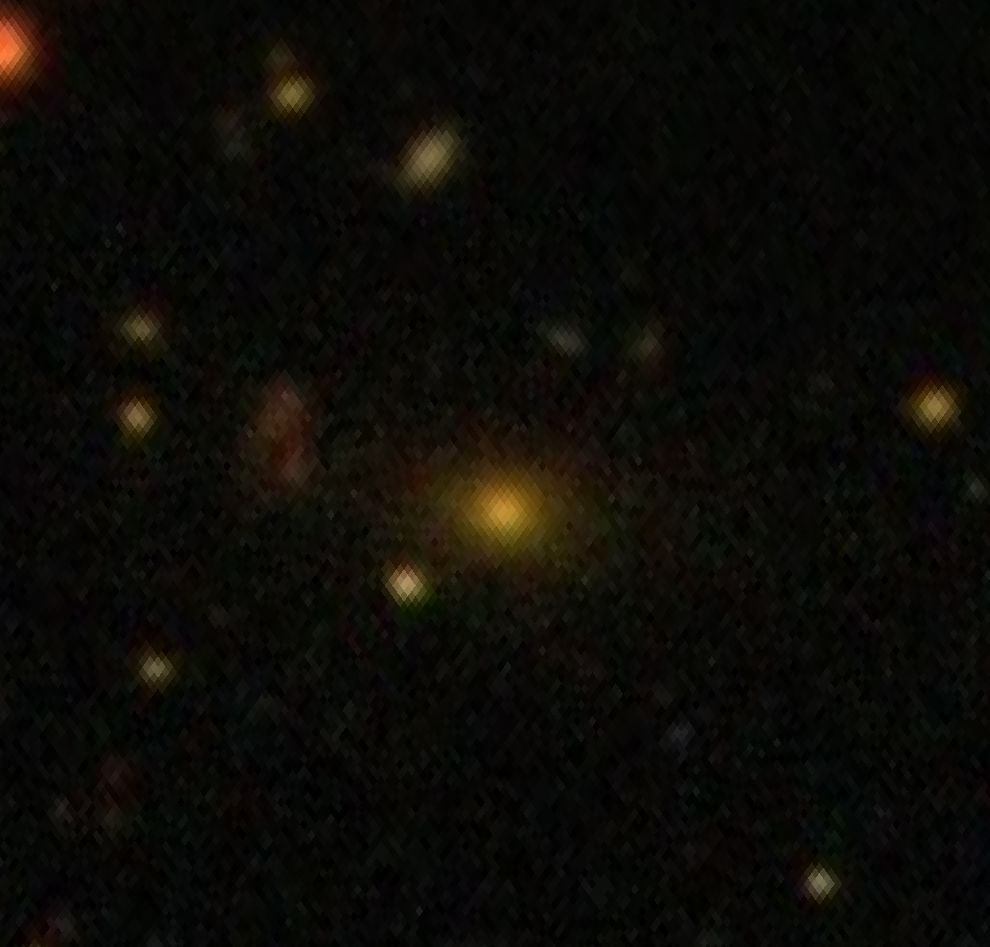
- The radio galaxy SDSS J102709.94+390805.1

Observation data (J2000.0 epoch)
- Constellation: Leo Minor
- Right ascension: 10^{h} 27^{m} 09.97^{s}
- Declination: +39° 08′ 05.08″
- Redshift: 0.337696
- Heliocentric radial velocity: 101,239 ± 21 km/s
- Distance: 4,882.3 ± 341.8 Mly (1,496.91 ± 104.79 Mpc)
- Group or cluster: WHL J102709.9+390805

Characteristics
- Type: BrClG
- Size: ~512,000 ly (157.1 kpc) (estimated)

Other designations
- B3 1024+393, 2MASX J10271000+3908050, 6C B102414.8+392345, 7C 1024+3923, NVSS J102710+390806, LEDA 2144000, WHL J102709.9+390805 BCG, [BOG2010] 1075981, [YHW2016] J156.79144+39.13474

SDSS J102709.94+390805.1 known as [BOG2010] 1075981, is a radio galaxy located in the constellation of Leo Minor. The redshift of the galaxy is (z) 0.337 and it was first discovered as an astronomical radio source by astronomers from the Bologna Sky Survey in February 1985.

== Description ==
SDSS J102709.94+390805.1 is an elliptical galaxy with an morphological classification of Type E. It is a red luminous galaxy residing as the brightest cluster galaxy (BCG) of the galaxy cluster, WHL J102709.9+390805, with 23 confirmed galaxy member candidates. The r-band magnitude of the galaxy is found to be 17.47 magnitude. Its absolute magnitude is -23.76.

The galaxy hosts an active galactic nucleus. It is classified as a Fanaroff-Riley Class Type I radio galaxy of non bent-tail subtype with its total flux density measured to be 43.60 mJy obtained by NRAO VLA Sky Survey (NVSS) at 1.4 GHz frequencies. It also contains an ultra steep spectrum source with the spectral index of -1.02α between 352 MHz and 1.4 GHz. The total radio luminosity is found to be 24.93 W Hz^{−1} at 1.4 GHz.

The radio morphology is mainly elongated, described by a single elliptical profile component or as a compact point-like component according to NVSS contour imaging. There is a presence of a radio core with its total core flux density estimated as 40.09 mJy. The total radio flux density is 43.40 mJy. The luminosity distance of the source is 1799.3 megaparsecs. The radio power has been calculated as 16.84 × 10^{24} WHz^{−1}.
