= TXS 1159+583 =

Radio galaxy in the constellation Ursa Major

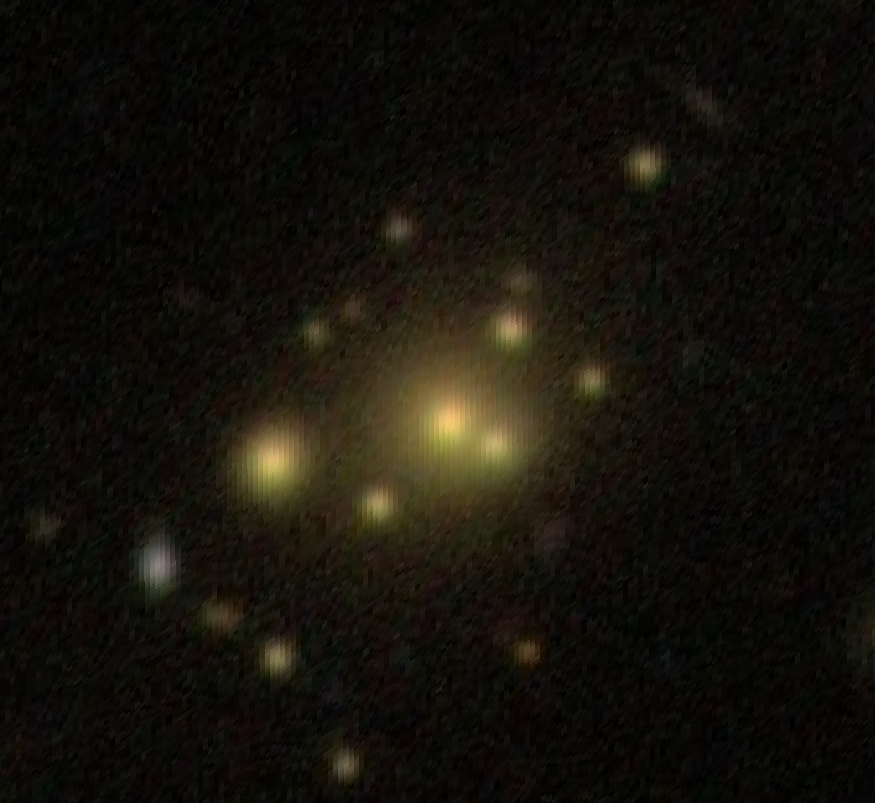
- SDSS image of TXS 1159+583

Observation data (J2000.0 epoch)
- Constellation: Ursa Major
- Right ascension: 12^{h} 02^{m} 04.19^{s}
- Declination: +58° 02′ 01.90″
- Redshift: 0.102800
- Heliocentric radial velocity: 30,819 km/s ± 5
- Distance: 1,486.8 ± 104.1 Mly (455.87 ± 31.91 Mpc)
- Group or cluster: Abell 1446
- magnitude (J): 13.43

Characteristics
- Type: BrCIG
- Size: ~472,000 ly (144.8 kpc) (estimated)

Other designations
- 14W 033, PGC 37981, 4C +58.23, 8C 1159+583, ABELL 1446:[HDH2012] BCG, 2MASX J12020385+5802081

TXS 1159+583 is a radio galaxy located in the constellation of Ursa Major. The redshift of the galaxy is (z) 0.102 and it was first discovered by astronomers as an astronomical radio source in September 1973, where it was identified as 4C 58.23 based on its radio and optical position. It is the brightest cluster galaxy (BCG) of Abell 1446.

== Description ==
TXS 1159+583 is classified as a head-tail radio galaxy or a wide angle-tailed (WAT) radio galaxy, with its tail structure remarkably extendible away from the galaxy host. The host galaxy is a large elliptical galaxy, dominating the center of the galaxy cluster and has been depicted to have a much more brighter appearance when compared to other galaxies members. There is a double nucleus present.

The source of the galaxy is considered as compact and it has been classified as a bend-double. When observed with both NRAO and Very Large Array (VLA), it is found to contain a compact nuclear component that contains a steep radio spectrum. There is also a hotspot feature found as clearly resolved and also bright, with an extend of around eight arcseconds. A radio jet is seen emerging outwards from the hotspot region before disappearing into the tail region. Further observations made by the VLA, would find the source is also small and also asymmetric given that the southern tail is both longer and much more narrower when compared to the tail in the north. The tail lobe of the southern one is found to have little signs of polarization between 5% and 15% but increases up to 40% upon reaching a second broadening.

Two radio lobes have also been discovered in the galaxy, bending into a C-shape. Traces of radio emission are shown to be coinciding together with the cluster X-ray emission within a 47 kiloparsec radius, hinting the galaxy has sunk to the bottom of the gravitational well. The radio lobes are also found also asymmetrical with the southern lobe being around 105 kiloparsecs long and the northern lobe only around 45 kiloparsecs in length.
