= S5 1803+784 =

BL Lac object in the constellation Draco

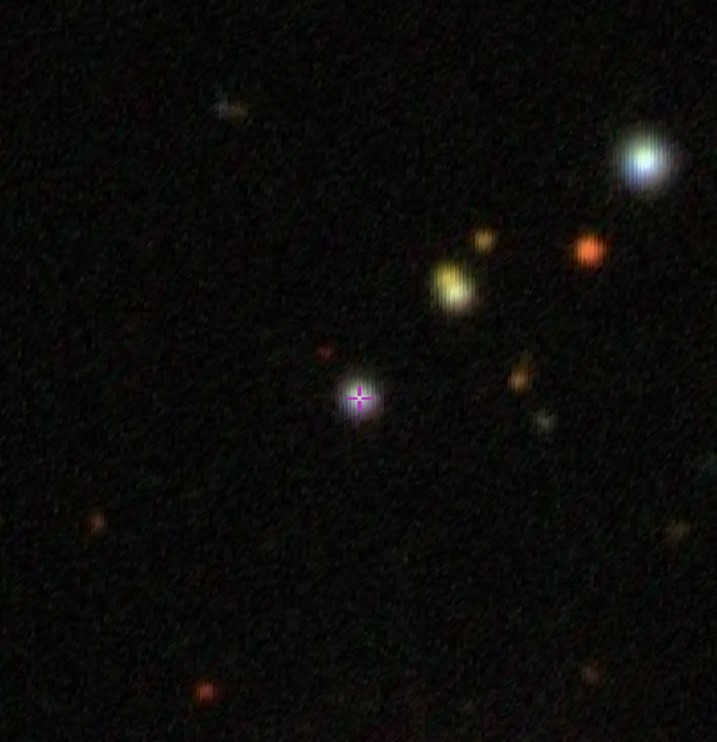
- The BL Lac object S5 1803+784.

Observation data (J2000.0 epoch)
- Constellation: Draco
- Right ascension: 18^{h} 00^{m} 45.683^{s}
- Declination: +78° 28′ 04.018″
- Redshift: 0.691000
- Heliocentric radial velocity: 207,157 km/s
- Distance: 6.419 Gly
- Apparent magnitude (V): 15.90
- Apparent magnitude (B): 16.4

Characteristics
- Type: FRSQ, BL LAC

Other designations
- IRAS 18036+7827, S5 1803+78, NVSS J180045+782805, WMAP 072, 4FGL J1800.6+7828, 6C B180338.9+782745

S5 1803+784 is a BL Lacertae object located in the far northern constellation of Draco. It has an estimated redshift (z) of 0.68 and was first discovered as an astronomical radio source in 1981 by a team of astronomers. This object is also classified as a blazar because of its extreme variability on the electromagnetic spectrum and a source of gamma ray activity. According to preliminary analysis in May 2011, the source of S5 1803+784 has a gamma ray flux (E >100 MeV) of 1.1 ± 0.2 × 10^{−6} photon cm^{−2} s^{−1}.

== Description ==
S5 1803+784 is in a constant flaring state. In April 2020, S5 1803+784 had a major outburst followed by more flaring episodes. During this period, S5 1803+784 exhibited highest flux level of 1.1 × 10^{−6} ph cm^{−2} s^{−1} while in pre-flaring region, a low flux was shown below 0.2 × 10^{−6} ph cm^{−2} s^{−1}. In August 2020, S5 1803+784 entered a new flaring phase which lasted for 57 days. Its source brightness varied from 13.617 ± 0.009 to 15.888 ± 0.01 in R-bands, which the brightest-ever state for S5 1803+783 was observed on August 25. It is also known to show near-infrared flares.

In an optical light curve, S5 1803+784 showed the overall variation greater than 3 magnitudes with the largest changes observed within three flares through no periodicity was found. However, the radio band variability is found different, showing modest oscillations instead of flares with a maximum amplitude of 30%.

S5 1803+784 shows a peculiar radio structure with a compact radio core. There is a presence of an ejector nozzle, 0.1 parsecs in diameter surrounded by a ring structure with both a diameter of 1.4 parsecs and a width of 0.25 parsecs. Furthermore, it has a weaker secondary component located 45 arcseconds south and slightly to the west side of the core with a faint emission bridge joining them together.

The jet of S5 1803+784 has a complex morphology. In milliarcsecond-scales, it is described as a bend chain of seven individual jet components with both separation gaps of 0.2 and 3 mas from its core, where new components appear to be emerging from it every two years. Three of the jet components are found to approach a brightest and stationary component (1.4 mas at 8.4 GHz) exhibiting apparent superluminal motion. Further studies showed in the jet's parsec-scale, most of the jet components within the inner core remain constant over a long period of time with the jet's width changing periodically around 8–9 years. Interestingly, the jet is shaped into a cone which the 18-cm emission from the injector region is found to be weaken by a factor of 300.
