= 6C B091638.9+362215 =

Radio galaxy in the constellation Lynx

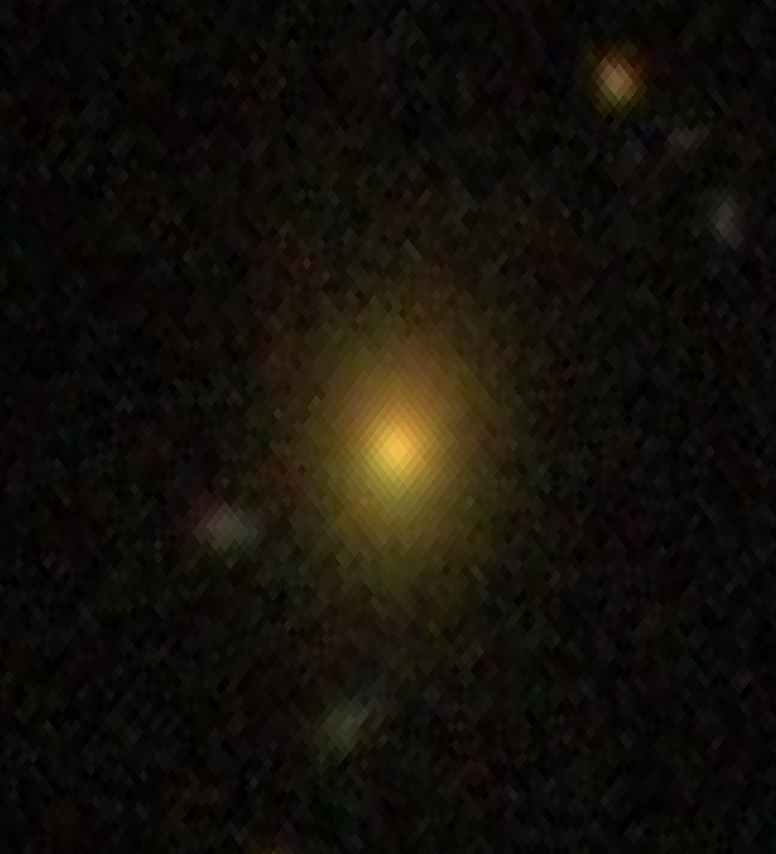
- SDSS image of 6C B091638.9+362215

Observation data (J2000.0 epoch)
- Constellation: Lynx
- Right ascension: 09^{h} 19^{m} 44.82^{s}
- Declination: +36° 09′ 49.33″
- Redshift: 0.223726
- Heliocentric radial velocity: 67,071 ± 9 km/s
- Distance: 3,237.9 ± 226.6 Mly (992.73 ± 69.49 Mpc)
- Group or cluster: WHL J091944.8+360949
- magnitude (K): 13.44

Characteristics
- Type: FR I
- Size: ~663,000 ly (203.2 kpc) (estimated)

Other designations
- B2 0916+36A, 2MASX J09194480+3609498, ILT J091944.97+360940.7, LEDA 2076043, [LHC2018] J139.93677+36.16371, OGC 0151, NYU-VAGC 0986260, NVSS J091945+360949, SDSS J091944.82+360949.4, WHL J091944.8+360949 BCG

6C B091638.9+362215 also known as OGC 151, J091944.82+360949.4 and NYU-VAGC 0986260, is a radio galaxy located in the constellation of Lynx. The redshift of the galaxy is (z) 0.223 and it was first discovered from a sample of 3,227 radio sources observed with the Bologna Cross Telescope in 1973, where it was designated as B2 0916+36A.

== Description ==
6C B091638.9+362215 is classified as a massive Type E elliptical galaxy, with its r-band magnitude calculated to be 16.38 magnitude by the Sloan Digital Sky Survey (SDSS). It is also a luminous red galaxy residing as the brightest cluster galaxy (BCG) of the galaxy cluster, WHL J091944.8+360949, with eight confirmed member candidates. The absolute magnitude of the galaxy is -23.86 and the stellar mass is 11.49 h^{−2} M_{☉}. The supermassive black hole located in the center of the galaxy has a mass of 9.04 M_{☉}.

The nucleus is active. It has been classified as a Fanaroff-Riley Class Type I radio galaxy, with the total radio flux density of 130.40 mJy calculated by NRAO VLA Sky Survey at 1.4 GHz frequencies. The optical spectrum of the galaxy displays both hydrogen-alpha and doubly ionized oxygen emission lines, with estimated luminosities of both lines 6.579 and 6.861 L_{☉}. Both the radio lobes are resolved, with the total size of the lobes reaching a distance of 212.30 kiloparsecs.

A study published in 2019, found it is a C-shaped radio galaxy. The source is small, with a total extent of 0.27 megaparsecs and a total radio luminosity at 1.4 GHz frequencies estimated to be 25.36 W Hz^{−1}. It resides in a poor galaxy environment, with the cluster having a richness less than 10. A study published in 2018, has estimated the radio luminosity as 25.31 W Hz^{−1}, while the 1.4 GHz flux density is 142.8 mJy.

It is an early-type galaxy based on it being categorized as a class b radio galaxy. The stellar velocity dispersion of the galaxy is 328 kilometers per second and the galaxy's effective radius is 15.1 kiloparsecs.
