= 6C B134444.5+420701 =

Radio galaxy in the constellation Canes Venatici

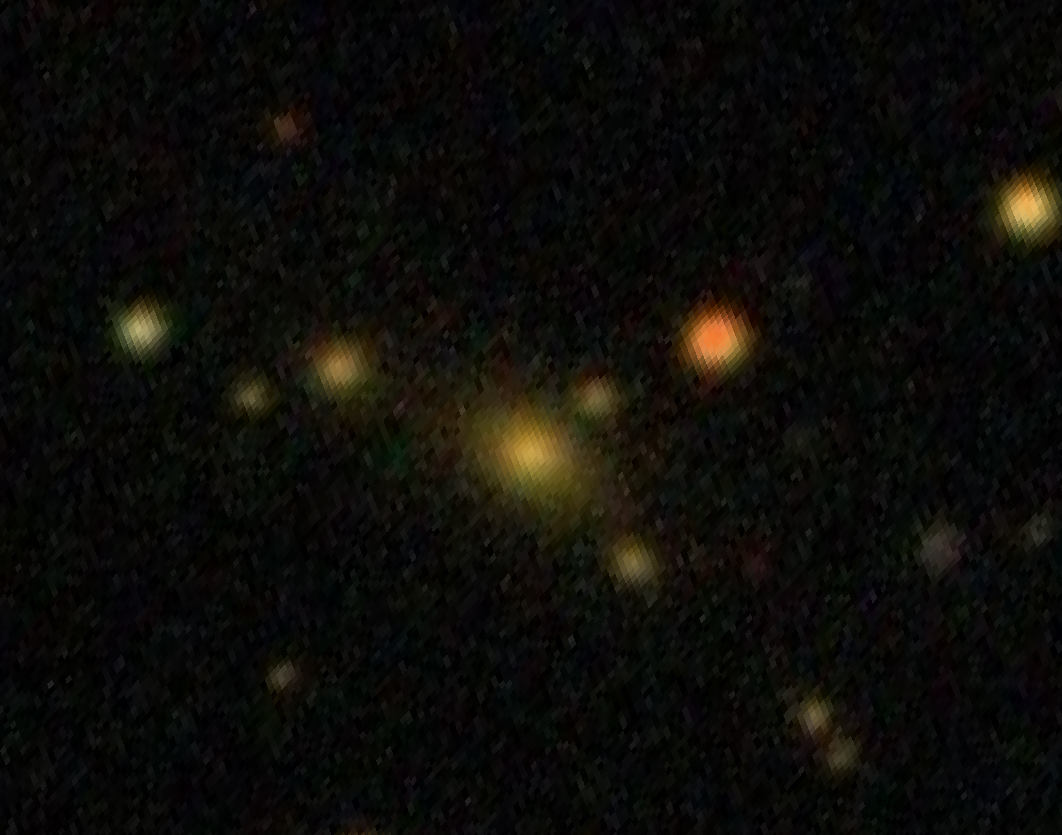
- SDSS image of 6C B134444.5+420701

Observation data (J2000.0 epoch)
- Constellation: Canes Venatici
- Right ascension: 13^{h} 46^{m} 51.24^{s}
- Declination: +41° 51′ 54.78″
- Redshift: 0.239624
- Heliocentric radial velocity: 71,838 ± 15 km/s
- Distance: 3,459.7 ± 242.2 Mly (1,060.74 ± 74.25 Mpc)
- Group or cluster: WHL J134651.2+415155
- magnitude (J): 15.40

Characteristics
- Type: BrClG
- Size: ~422,500 ly (129.54 kpc) (estimated)

Other designations
- B3 1344+421, 2MASX J13465122+4151545, 7C 1344+4207, ATATS J134649.7+415159, LEDA 2188192, SDSS J134651.22+415154.6, WHL J134651.2+415155 BCG

6C B134444.5+420701 also known as J134651.2+415154, is a radio galaxy located in the constellation of Canes Venatici. The redshift of the galaxy is (z) 0.239 and it was first discovered in the Sixth Cambridge Survey of Radio Sources by astronomers in October 1988.

== Description ==
6C B134444.5+420701 is a luminous red galaxy residing in the center as the brightest cluster galaxy (BCG) of the galaxy cluster, WHL J134651.2+415155. There is a supermassive black hole residing inside the center of the galaxy with a mass of 8.54 M_{☉}. The total r-band magnitude is 17.14, while the r-band absolute magnitude is -23.40.

The nucleus of the galaxy is active. It is a Fanaroff-Riley Class Type I radio galaxy, although a previous observation categorized it as a Fanaroff-Riley Class Type II radio galaxy. There is a radio core, although there is an absence of any hot spot features. The total radio flux density is 185.6 mJy at 1.4 GHz frequencies. The linear size of the source is 245.67 kiloparsecs.

The galaxy has both hydrogen-alpha and doubly ionized oxygen emission lines in its optical spectrum. The estimated line luminosities are 6.444 and 0.000 L_{☉} respectively. The radio lobes in the galaxy span a total length of 153.91 kiloparsecs. It is also an S-shaped radio galaxy, with a total radio luminosity of 25.51 W Hz^{−1} at 1.4 GHz, with the source having a small extent of 0.16 megaparsecs. It is a bent-tailed radio galaxy.
