= QSO B1611+343 =

Blazar in the constellation of Corona Borealis

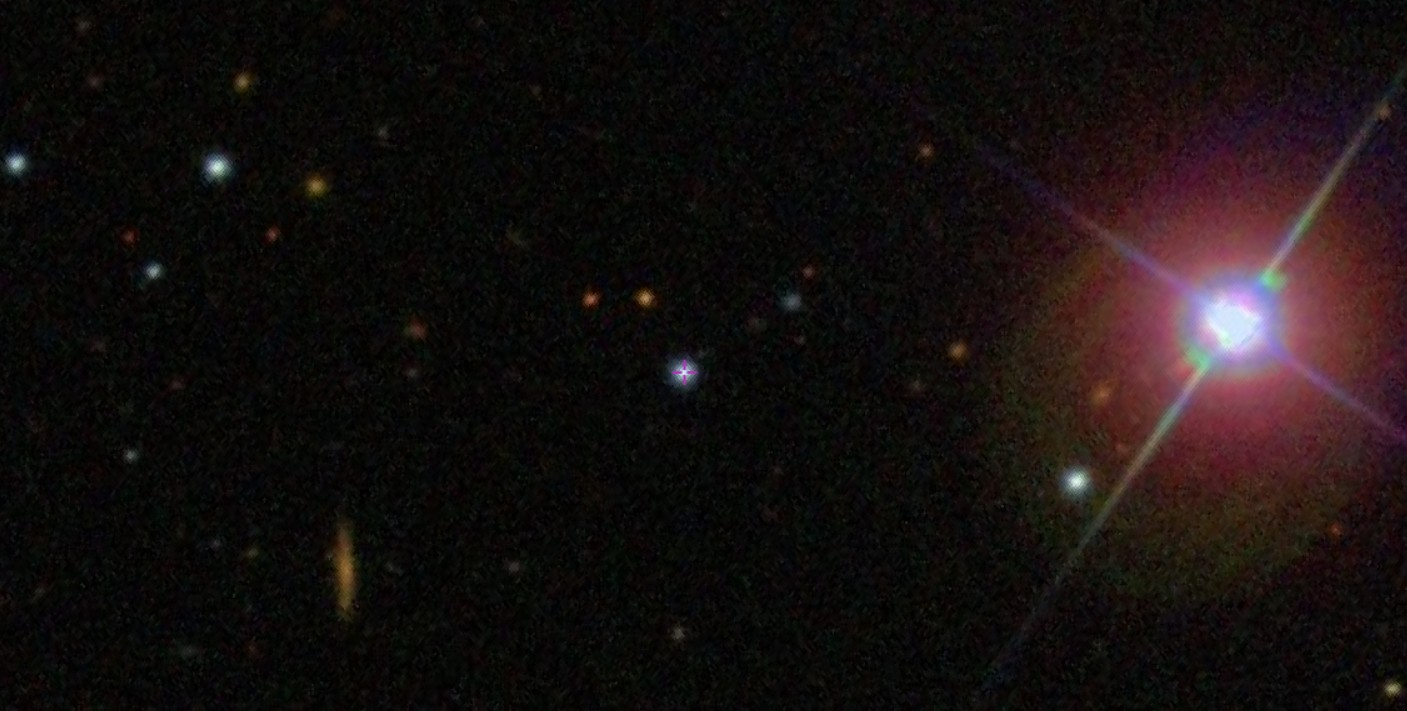
- The blazar QSO B1611+343.

Observation data (J2000.0 epoch)
- Constellation: Corona Borealis
- Right ascension: 16^{h} 13^{m} 41.0642^{s}
- Declination: +34° 12′ 47.909″
- Redshift: 1.398040
- Heliocentric radial velocity: 419,122 km/s
- Distance: 8.809 Gly
- Apparent magnitude (V): 17.46
- Apparent magnitude (B): 17.98

Characteristics
- Type: FSRQ, blazar

Other designations
- DA 406, WMAP 23, QSO J1613+3412, LHE 403, 6C 161147+342017, SDSS J161341.06+341247.8, OHIO S 319, INTREF 677, PGC 4062791

QSO B1611+343 also known as DA 406, is a blazar located in the northern constellation of Corona Borealis. Its redshift is (z) 1.4 and it is classified as an optically violent variable quasar or an OVV quasar although lowly polarized. Its radio spectrum is flat, making it a flat-spectrum source with a spectral index of -0.04.

== Description ==
QSO B1611+343 is variable on the electromagnetic spectrum, showing a low-frequency radio outburst in 1987 and temporal significant variations. In the 1983–1991 period it displayed optical fluxes ranging from 0.27 to 0.7 mJy with a short-term flickering period recorded on time scales between February 28, 1995 and 8 April 1996. A near-infrared flare was detected in June 2012 by astronomers during the monitoring of gamma ray sources by the Fermi Gamma-ray Space Telescope. The light curves of the object showed it to be moderately variable at 2.7, 4.9 and 8.0 GHz frequencies, exhibiting a major flux surging below 880 MHz.

QSO B1611+343 is described as a powerful core-dominated source. When imaged by the Very Large Array, it is found to have a triple morphology with its southern extension being consistent with the position angle of a bright component located in the south. Results of the snapshot observations at 92 centimeters by Very Long Baseline Interferometry (VLBI) showed the source is fully resolved with a diffused component containing 37% of the flux density. On milliarcsecond scales at 2.32 GHz observed by VLBI, the radio core is found to be elongated and exposed, measuring 3 milliarcseconds in diameter. This core also has the highest rotation measure, starting at −519±55 rad m^{–2} before declining to −44±55 rad m^{−2} upon reaching 10 parsecs within it.

The jet of QSO B1611+343 in multi-epoch observations is moving in a southerly direction, subsequently terminating at a bright diffused component located 2.9 milliarcseconds from the core. When imaged in high resolution observations by VLBI, it bends eastwards by 3 milliarcseconds, displaying superluminal motion. Based on observations it contains at least four components; all of them moving at apparent speeds of 6.7±1.6, 3.8±1.4, 7.6±1.3 and 11.5±2.3 h^{−1} c. Polarized weak flux was also discovered southwards from one of the components, likely associated with a stationary oblique shock, causing the jet to change its trajectory.

The supermassive black hole in QSO B1611+343 has a mass of 9.69 ± 0.02, estimated from a singly ionized magnesium line. Based on studies, its accretion rate should be approximately M_{0.9} = 5.3 M_{☉} yr^{−1} and Log M_{0.9982} = 3.7 M_{☉} yr^{−1}.
