= 4C 03.24 =

Radio galaxy in the constellation Virgo

Observation data (J2000.0 epoch)
- Constellation: Virgo
- Right ascension: 12^{h} 45^{m} 38.32^{s}
- Declination: +03° 23′ 20.89″
- Redshift: 3.569900
- Heliocentric radial velocity: 1,070229 km/s
- Distance: 11.546 Gly

Characteristics
- Type: Radio galaxy
- Notable features: Giant emission Lyman-alpha nebula surrounding the galaxy

Other designations
- LEDA 2818474, PKS 1243+036, MRC 1243+036, USS 1243+036, NVSS J124538+032319, 1243+03

4C 03.24 is a radio galaxy located in the constellation of Virgo. Its redshift is (z) 3.56 and it was first identified as a discrete radio source located in the northern sky by astronomers in 1979. The radio spectrum of this source is found to be ultra-steep, making it an ultra-steep spectrum source (USS) based on deep R-band CCD imaging and was later identified with an R magnitude 22.5 galaxy.

== Description ==
4C 03.24 is classified as a Type 2 Fanaroff-Riley Class radio galaxy. Its size is estimated to be greater than 1.7 kiloparsecs with a star-formation rate of 142 M_{☉} yr^{−1}. The star-formation luminosity of the galaxy is 1.23+2.08
−1.13×10^{12} L_{☉} based on Atacama Large Millimeter Array (ALMA) observations.

The source of 4C 03.24, best described as a double, has a northern radio lobe containing a compact component with a tail extension extending towards the north. The southern radio lobe of the galaxy shows a compact feature near its nucleus and a bent jet going south from the northern component. This jet is also slightly extended to the west. Between the lobes, there is a faint radio emission region containing a core-jet structure which is orientated at –24°. Imaging by the Hubble Space Telescope also discovered a small component beyond its northern hotspot. There is a radio core clearly detected at 4.7 GHz and 8.3 GHz frequencies, located 0.5 arcseconds from an X-ray source.

The galaxy is surrounded by a giant irregular Lyman-alpha emission nebula with a projected size of 5.3" x 0.9". When imaged with the Subaru Telescope and FOCAS spectrometer, the nebula is found to have an extremely complicated structure. The first component shown displays an asymmetric blue profile. The second component found extended, is located on both sides of the nucleus with an outer-halo extending at a systematic velocity. The third component is found blueshifted with a velocity of –1000 km/s. There is another blueshifted component on the northwest side; the opposite side of the nucleus, with a wide velocity width of 1900 km/s at full width at half maximum. Further evidence also showed the nebula is extended by 30 kiloparsecs, suggesting it was caused by circumgalactic matter being ionized by the AGN's anisotropic hard radiation. Alternatively, it might be created by superwind outflows, given the galaxy showed elongated core-like or bubble structures protruding in opposite directions. Observations also suggested the jet is interacting with the interstellar gas within the inner region based on Lyman-alpha imaging.

A detection of a weak X-ray emission halo has been discovered around 4C 03.24. Based on results, the X-ray luminosity of the halo is 3 × 10^{44} erg/s and is found to be four times fainter compared to two other high-redshift radio galaxies, 4C 41.17 and 4C 60.07, which were observed previously. Companion systems have also been discovered in 4C 03.24 by both James Webb Space Telescope and ALMA in 2025 who found three [C III] emitters.
