= ZwCl 2701 BCG =

Brightest cluster galaxy in the constellation Ursa Major

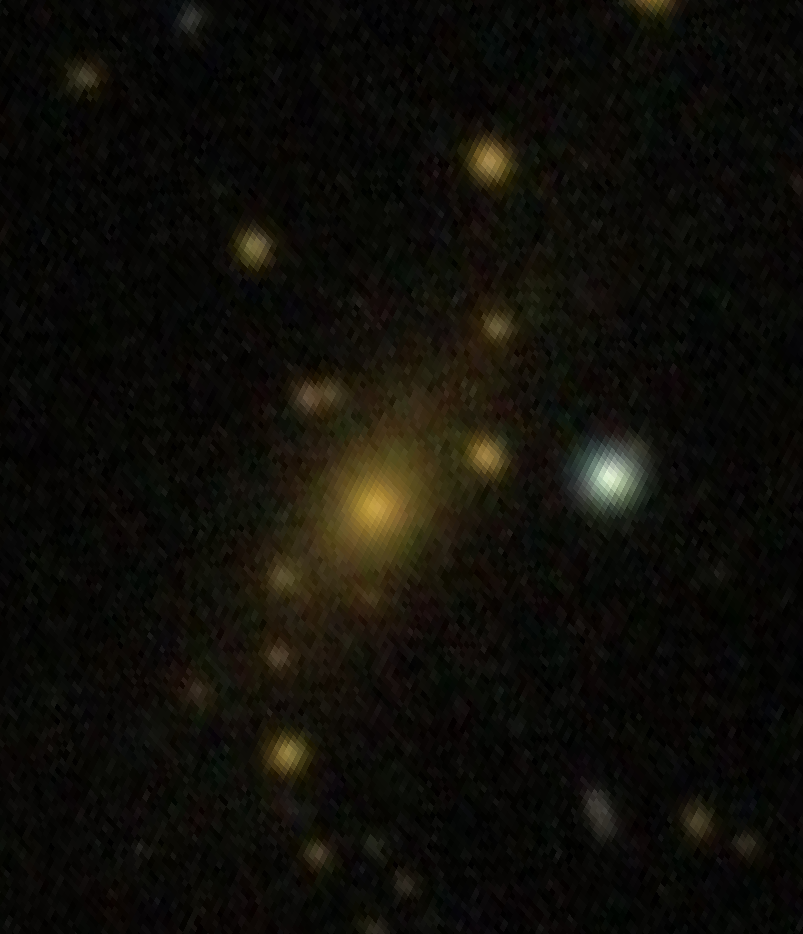
- SDSS image of ZwCl 2701 BCG

Observation data (J2000.0 epoch)
- Constellation: Ursa Major
- Right ascension: 09^{h} 52^{m} 49.17^{s}
- Declination: +51° 53′ 05.07″
- Redshift: 0.215194
- Heliocentric radial velocity: 65,414 ± 11 km/s
- Distance: 3,105.5 ± 217.4 Mly (952.15 ± 66.65 Mpc)
- Group or cluster: ZwCl 2701
- Magnitude (J): 14.94

Characteristics
- Type: BrCLG
- Size: ~492,000 ly (150.9 kpc) (estimated)

Other designations
- 6C B094930.7+520714, 2MASX J09524915+5153053, LEDA 2401970, 7C 0949+5207, OGC 0788, NVSS J095249+515306, MaxBCG J148.20486+51.88475 BCG

ZwCl 2701 BCG (short for ZwCl 2701 Brightest Cluster Galaxy) is an elliptical galaxy residing as the brightest cluster galaxy of the ZwCl 2701 galaxy cluster. The redshift of the galaxy is (z) 0.215 and it was first discovered by astronomers in a ROSAT Survey of X-ray clusters in May 1995. The galaxy has been classified as of LINER (Low Ionization Nuclear Emission-Line Region) type.

== Description ==
ZwCl 2701 BCG is categorized as a radio galaxy. When observed through radio imaging, the radio emission of the source is depicted as extending in both north-east and south-west directions, with the source's center being coincident with the galaxy itself and also the X-ray peak. There is a presence of a radio jet in the direction of north-east and about 206 kiloparsecs in length. The radio core is resolved and it has a total flux density of 119 mJy at 1.4 GHz frequencies. The total radio luminosity of the source has been estimated as 2.20 × 10^{41} erg s^{1}. Further radio observations discovered two radio lobes located about seven arcseconds both east and west from the core region. There is also a filamentary structure in the northern direction. A compact component is seen in the center being surrounded by diffused radio emission with the peak brightness of 14 mJy.

The total star formation of the galaxy has been estimated as low with only 1 M_{☉} per year based on a 24 ɥm measurement photometry study published in 2009 with the hydrogen-alpha luminosity being at 40.64 erg s^{−1}. The central regions of the galaxy also showed either no or only marginal detections of molecular gas. Evidence also found there are presence of X-ray cavities depicted as depressions of low surface brightness, with another study finding out the emission from the lobes likely filled these cavities up. The estimated power of the cavities is 2.27 × 10^{45} erg s^{−1}. The central supermassive black hole of the galaxy is 5.44 × 10^{8} M_{☉} with the accretion rate being at 0.11 M_{☉} per year.
