= WISEA J110524.16+594341.2 =

Radio galaxy in the constellation Ursa Major

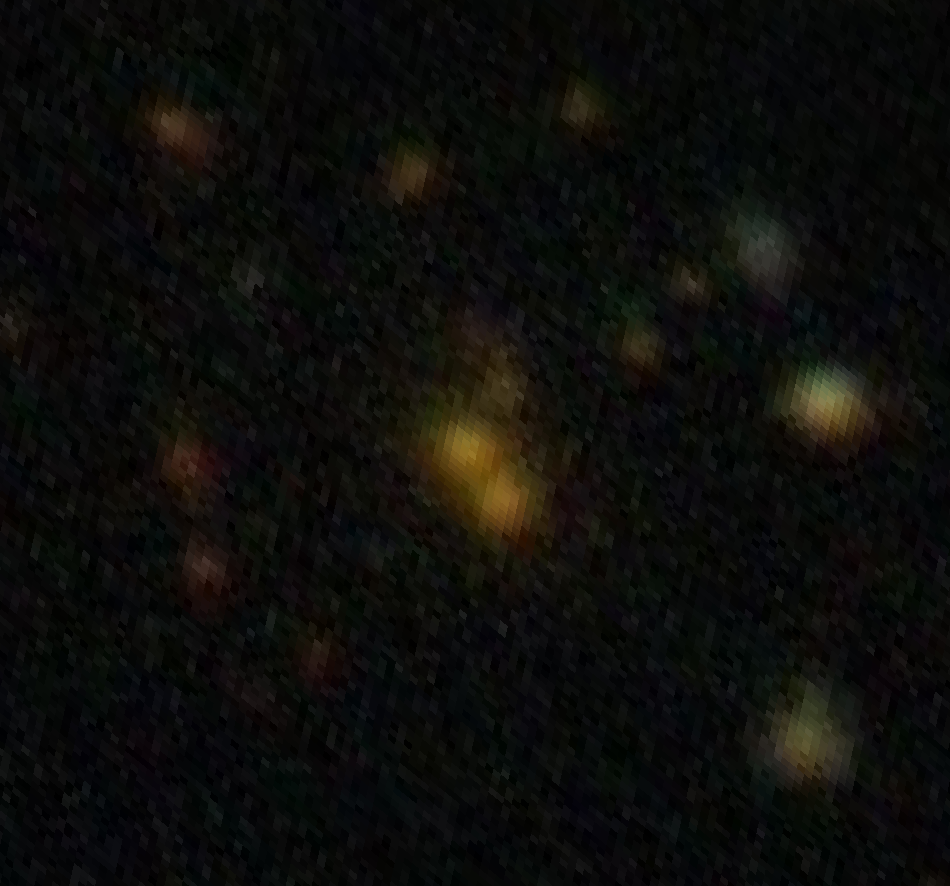
- SDSS image of WISEA J110524.16+594341.2

Observation data (J2000.0 epoch)
- Constellation: Ursa Major
- Right ascension: 11^{h} 05^{m} 24.16^{s}
- Declination: +59° 43′ 41.29″
- Redshift: 0.359445
- Heliocentric radial velocity: 107,759 ± 27 km/s
- Distance: 5,190.9 ± 363.4 Mly (1,591.53 ± 111.41 Mpc)
- Group or cluster: WHL J110524.2+594342
- magnitude (H): 15.23

Characteristics
- Type: FR II
- Size: ~644,000 ly (197.5 kpc) (estimated)

Other designations
- 2MASX J11052411+5943395, 6C B110221.8+595927, 7C 1102+5959, GB6 J1105+5943, [SBP2022] J1105+5943, SDSS J110524.25+594342.0, NVSS J110523+594338, WHL J110524.3+594341 BCG, LEDA 3408956

WISEA J110524.16+594341.2 also known as J1105+5943 and J110524.25+594342.0, is a radio galaxy located in the constellation of Ursa Major. The redshift of the galaxy is (z) 0.35 and it was first discovered from the Sixth Cambridge Survey of Radio Sources by astronomers in September 1990.

== Description ==
WISEA J110524.16+594341.2 is a red luminous galaxy residing in the WHL J110524.2+594342 galaxy cluster, with a total angular separation between it and the cluster center estimated to be just one arcsecond and a linear distance of 5.0 kiloparsecs.

The nucleus is active and has been categorized as a Fanaroff-Riley Class Type II radio galaxy with a total radio luminosity of 5.60 × 10^{43} erg s^{−1} and contains a compact radio source. The total flux density calculated by the NRAO VLA Sky Survey (NVSS) is 81.00 mJy at 1.4 GHz frequencies. The absolute magnitude of the galaxy is -22.92 magnitude.

A study found it is a wide angle-tail (WAT) radio galaxy. The radio spectra index between 3 GHz and 1.4 GHz is 0.7α and the total flux density is 51.95 mJy at 3 GHz frequencies. The 1.4 GHz logarithmic luminosity is 25.58 W Hz^{−1}. A radio jet is present, with the jet opening angle estimated to be 122.5° and a jet curvature radius of 17.5 arcseconds in total. The largest angular size is 37 arcseconds, while the largest linear size is 192.0 kiloparsecs. The flux density at 1400 MHz is 89 mJy and the flux density at 150 MHz is 504 mJy.
