= SDSS J114230.94+411727.6 =

Radio galaxy in the constellation of Ursa Major

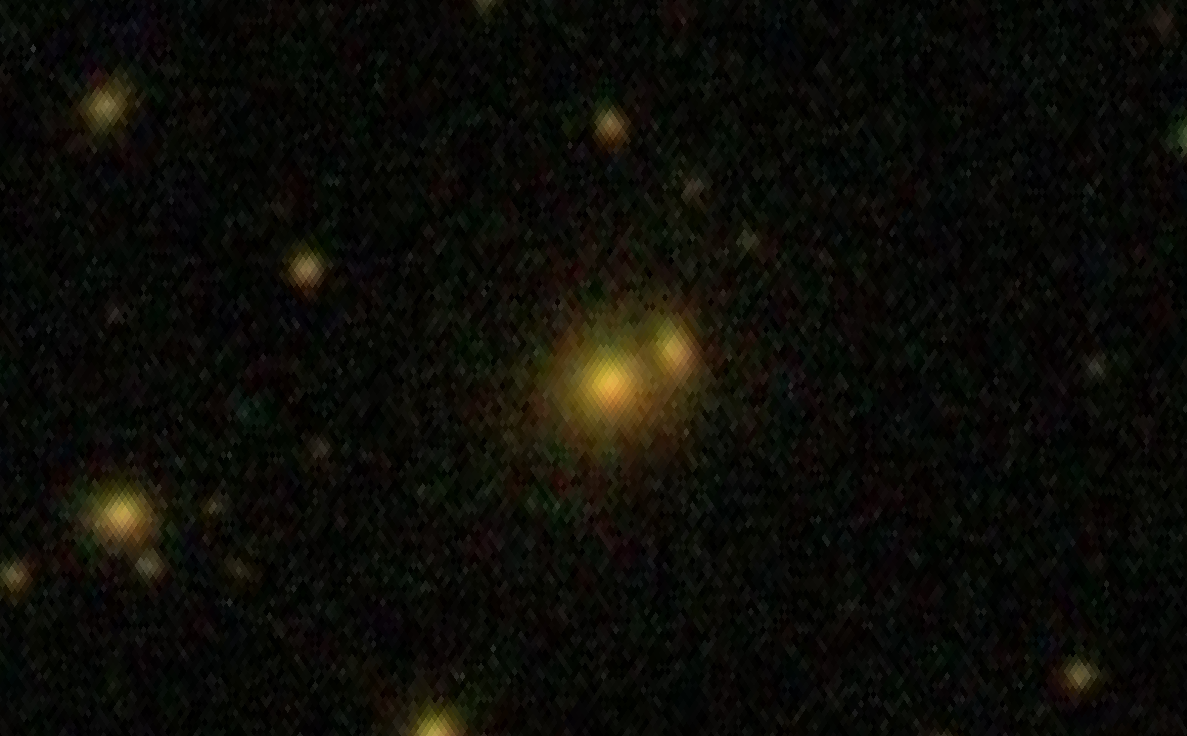
- SDSS image of SDSS J114230.94+411727.6

Observation data (J2000.0 epoch)
- Constellation: Ursa Major
- Right ascension: 11^{h} 42^{m} 30.91^{s}
- Declination: +41° 17′ 27.61″
- Redshift: 0.255018
- Heliocentric radial velocity: 76,453 ± 12 km/s
- Distance: 3,688.5 ± 258.2 Mly (1,130.91 ± 79.16 Mpc)
- Group or cluster: WHL J114230.9+411728
- magnitude (J): 14.55

Characteristics
- Type: BrClG
- Size: ~874,800 ly (268.23 kpc) (estimated)

Other designations
- 1139+4133, 2MASX J11423088+4117274, 6C B113951.5+413357, B3 1139+415, [LHC2018] J175.62890+41.29099, LEDA 2178725, NVSS J114230+411728, WHL J114230.9+411728 BCG, [YHW2016] J175.62889+41.29099

SDSS J114230.94+411727.6 also known as [LHC2018] J175.62890+41.29099, is a radio galaxy located in the constellation of Ursa Major. The redshift of the galaxy is estimated to be located at (z) 0.255.

== Description ==
SDSS J114230.94+411727.6 is an elliptical galaxy residing as the brightest cluster galaxy of the WHL J114230.9+411728 galaxy cluster with 35 confirmed galaxy member candidates. The R-band magnitude of the galaxy is estimated to be 16.79 magnitude and its absolute magnitude is -23.85.

The central nucleus is active and has been classified as a non-bent compact radio galaxy with a total radio flux density of 114.40 mJy calculated by the NRAO VLA Sky Survey (NVSS). The radio morphology of the source is elongated, depicted as a single elliptical profile component, although NVSS suggested it has compact morphology that is best described as a single point-like component. A radio core with a core flux density of 100.14 mJy has been detected and the radio emission flux density is 114.20 mJy. The total radio power has been calculated to be 22.99 × 10^{24} WHz^{−1}. The galaxy also contains a GHz (Gigahertz) source with previous measured flux density of 35 mJy and the total spectral index is -0.8α.

The stellar mass of the galaxy is 11.51 M_{☉} while the total log radio luminosity is 25.34 W Hz^{−1}. The total flux density at 1.4 GHz frequencies is 114.2 mJy. The rest frame r^{01} magnitude is -23.108.
