= 6C B133058.8+575451 =

Radio galaxy in the constellation Ursa Major

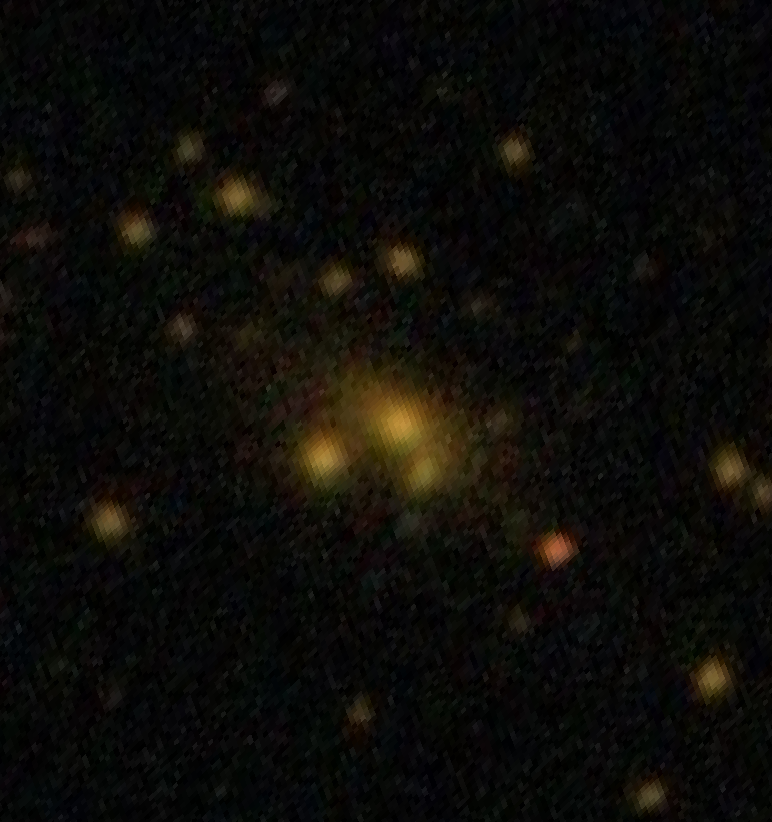
- SDSS image of 6C B133058.8+575451

Observation data (J2000.0 epoch)
- Constellation: Ursa Major
- Right ascension: 13^{h} 32^{m} 50.65^{s}
- Declination: +57° 39′ 41.90″
- Redshift: 0.301091
- Heliocentric radial velocity: 90265 ± 46 km/s
- Distance: 4,348.2 ± 304.4 Mly (1,333.15 ± 93.33 Mpc)
- Group or cluster: Abell 1761 (WHL J133250.7+573942)
- magnitude (J): 14.61

Characteristics
- Type: AGN
- Size: ~713,000 ly (218.7 kpc) (estimated)

Other designations
- 2MASX J13325065+5739418, SDSS J133250.67+573941.6, LEDA 2569523, [YCH2015] J203.2111+57.6616, [YHW2016] J203.21107+57.66164, WHL J133250.7+573942 BCG

6C B133058.8+575451 is a radio galaxy located in the constellation of Ursa Major. The redshift of the galaxy is (z) 0.301 and it was first discovered by astronomers in July 1993.

== Description ==
6C B133058.8+575451 is the brightest cluster galaxy of the Abell 1761 galaxy cluster, which is also known as WHL J133250.7+573942, with 50 confirmed galaxy member candidates. The R-band magnitude of the galaxy is 16.91 while its absolute magnitude is-24.19. The infrared J-band and H-band magnitudes are estimated to be 16.12 and 15.47 respectively.

The optical spectrum of the galaxy has presence of both hydrogen-alpha and doubly ionized oxygen emission lines with estimated line luminosities of 0.000 and 7.340 L_{☉}. A supermassive black hole is located in the center of the galaxy with mass of 8.77 M_{☉}.

The nucleus is found to be active and it is classified as a Fanaroff-Riley Class Type II radio galaxy with its estimated flux density of 228.00 mJy by NRAO VLA Sky Survey (NVSS) at 1.4 GHz frequencies. The radio lobes are resolved and they have a total lobe size of 33.55 kiloparsecs in total. The angular size of the source is 15.14 arcseconds while the total log 1.4 GHz radio luminosity is 26.29 WHz^{−1}. There is also a presence of a radio jet whose jet power is calculated to be 45.23 erg s^{−1} whereas the accretion disk luminosity is 0.000 erg s^{−1}. Radio imaging made with Very Large Array (VLA) at 20 centimeters found the radio flux density at 1400 MHz is 221 mJy while its absolute radio luminosity at 1400 MHz is 25.43 W Hz^{−1}.
