= 3C 303.1 =

Seyfert type 2 galaxy in the constellation Ursa Minor

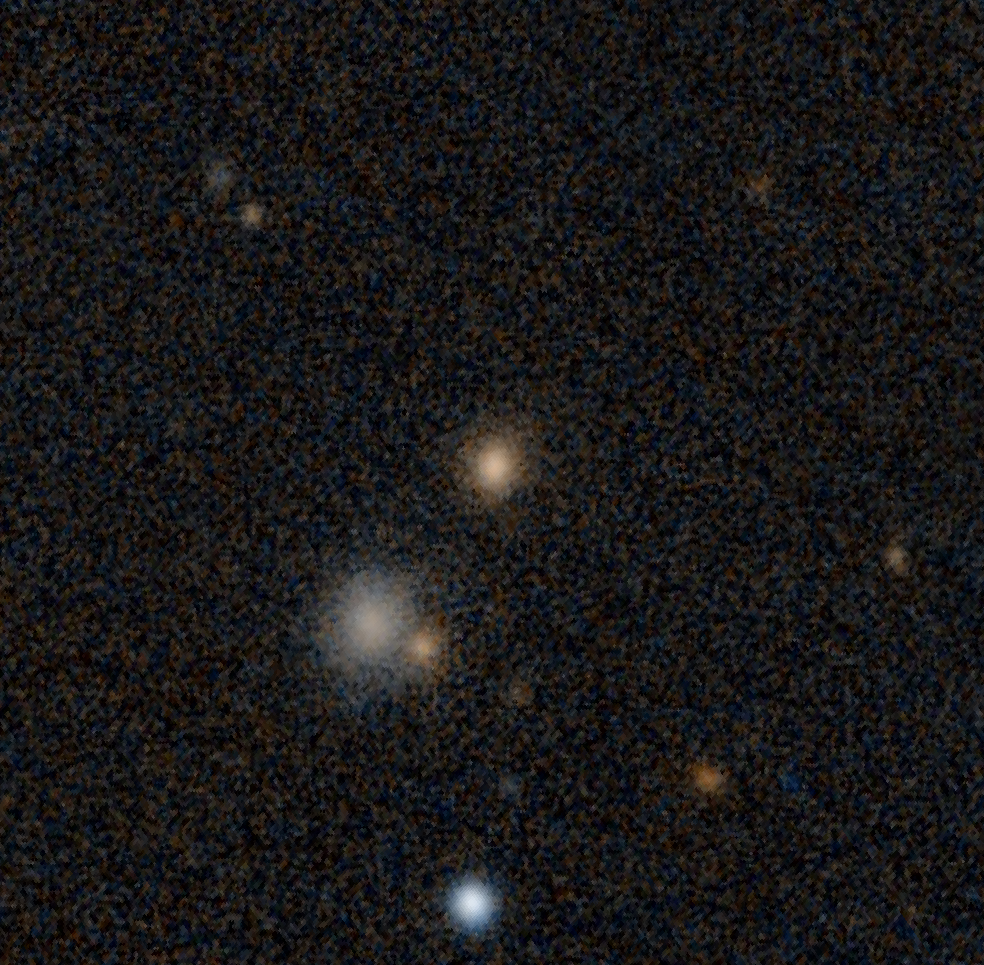
- Pan-STARRS image of 3C 303.1

Observation data (J2000.0 epoch)
- Constellation: Ursa Minor
- Right ascension: 14^{h} 43^{m} 14.56^{s}
- Declination: +77° 07′ 27.71″
- Redshift: 0.270400
- Heliocentric radial velocity: 81,064 km/s
- Distance: 3.245 Gly
- Apparent magnitude (B): 19

Characteristics
- Type: NLRG;HEG AGN2

Other designations
- 4C +77.13, LEDA 2821949, NVSS J144314+770726, 6C B144354.1+772003, 8C 1443+773, S5 1443+77, NRAO 0453, WN B1443.9+7720

3C 303.1 is a Seyfert type 2 galaxy located in the constellation of Ursa Minor. The redshift of the object is (z) 0.270 and it was first discovered in the Third Cambridge Catalogue of Radio Sources survey in 1962, where it was identified with a galaxy counterpart in October 1980.

== Description ==
3C 303.1 is a radio galaxy with a strong compact steep spectrum (CSS) source. The host galaxy has a central nucleus that is elongated with two dust lanes obscuring it on both sides. The inner part of the structure is complicated, with the major axis of the isophotes twisted by more than 35°, and has a high surface brightness structure located southeast from the nucleus, implying the galaxy might be in the stages of an ongoing merger. The total ultraviolet luminosity and radio power of the galaxy is estimated to be 8.66 ± 0.66 L_{☉} and 25.86 Hz, with studies suggesting it underwent a burst of star formation around 10 million years ago.

Radio imaging shows the source has an asymmetric double structure. The structure has two radio lobes located southeast and northwest, of similar morphologies but different flux densities. Two components are present in the source, made up of a highly polarized northern component reaching polarization levels of around 20% and a lowly polarized bright southern component with polarization levels of only 1%. No evidence of a radio core is detected.

Imaging by the European VLBI Network have shown the source to have an elliptical structure with compact knots, in which an elongated feature emerges within from westward direction. An extended radio jet is found present on the western side of the source via combined imaging with the European VLBI Network and MERLIN. There is low surface brightness radio emission and a faint component described as remains of a low brightness feature that is located at the position angle of -41°. Chandra X-ray Observatory found presence of X-ray emission in the galaxy.

The galaxy has an elongated emission-line nebula region. When observed, the region is found to display an S-shaped morphology with a bright inner structure orienting along the position angle of 40°, before changing its direction to north-south and extending by three milliarcseconds. A blob region is seen being dominated by its line emission while an arc-like structure is found perpendicular and located in the direction of south of its nucleus. Studies also showed its emission-lines might be photoionized by the extended shocked gas with the gas luminosity contributing between 30% and 70%.
