= IRAS 17020+4544 =

Seyfert galaxy in the constellation Hercules

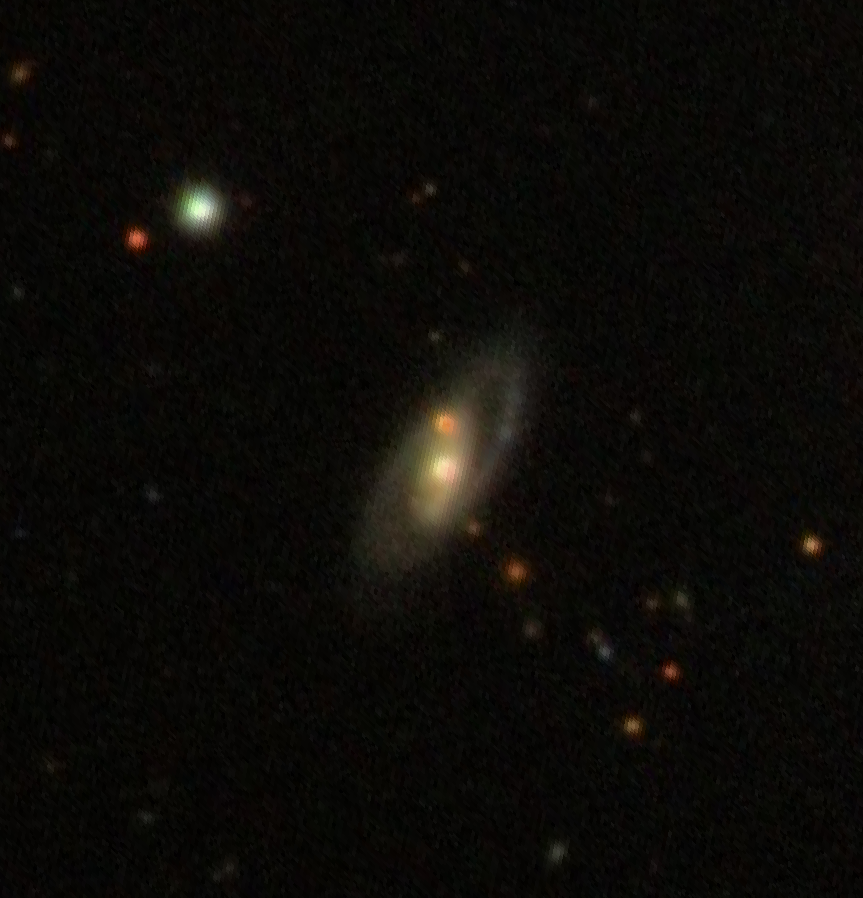
- SDSS image of IRAS 17020+4544

Observation data (J2000 epoch)
- Constellation: Hercules
- Right ascension: 17^{h} 03^{m} 30.38^{s}
- Declination: +45° 40′ 47.16″
- Redshift: 0.060400
- Heliocentric radial velocity: 18,107 ± 90 km/s
- Distance: 886.0 ± 62.3 Mly (271.66 ± 19.11 Mpc)
- magnitude (J): 12.87

Characteristics
- Type: SBab;Sy1 Sy2
- Size: ~201,000 ly (61.5 kpc) (estimated)

Other designations
- 2MASX J17033041+4540470, LEDA 97541, B3 1702+457, 6C JB170204.8+454510, LDOG 45, RBS 1623, RX J1703.5+4540

IRAS 17020+4544 is a narrow-line Seyfert galaxy located in the constellation of Hercules. The redshift of the galaxy is (z) 0.060 and it was first discovered by astronomers in October 1997 who discovered it contains high levels of polarization. This object has been classified as radio-loud.

== Description ==
IRAS 17020+4544 is categorized as an undisturbed spiral galaxy with an active galactic nucleus (AGN) that is depicted as being less powerful with a power of only 5 × 10^{44} erg s^{−1}. The total star formation rate of the galaxy is estimated to be 26 M_{☉} per year and the central supermassive black hole is approximately 5.9 × 10 M_{☉}. The optical spectrum of the nuclear region of the galaxy contains narrow emission lines that are described as H II regions. A companion dwarf galaxy is near IRAS 17020+4544, suggesting the interaction with it has caused the triggering of the latter's AGN.

The radio structure of IRAS 17020+4544 is compact. When observed with the Very Long Baseline Array (VLBA), it has a core-jet structure morphology with a few jet components. The radio spectrum of the galaxy is characterized as steep, making it quite similar to studied compact steep spectrum (CSS) sources with a resolved radio core. A further radio observation has detected the presence of an elongated jet structure located in the southwest direction with a measured length of 30 milliarcseconds. Evidence also suggested the source is shown as elongated from east and west direction with the most compact component mainly surrounded by radio emission on two sides. The total flux density of the source is around 23 mJy.

A study published in January 2021 reports detections of molecular gas in the galaxy being mainly distributed into a disc, with the molecular mass roughly estimated as 10^{8} M_{☉}. There are detections of molecular outflows from the galaxy with the velocity roughly calculated as -660 kilometers per seconds. X-ray winds were also detected with an outflow velocity of 27,300 ± 30 kilometers per seconds.
