= 6C B113753.5+442220 =

Radio galaxy in the constellation Ursa Major

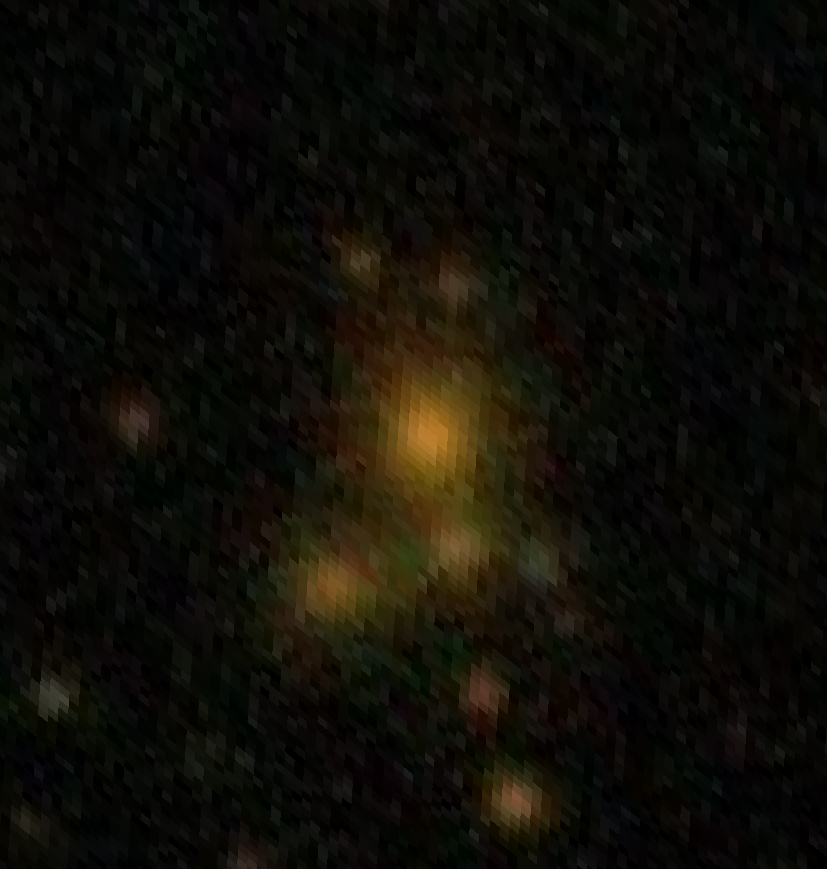
- SDSS image of 6C B113753.5+442220

Observation data (J2000.0 epoch)
- Constellation: Ursa Major
- Right ascension: 11^{h} 40^{m} 34.37^{s}
- Declination: +44° 05′ 48.41″
- Redshift: 0.383663
- Heliocentric radial velocity: 115,019 ± 25 km/s
- Distance: 5,534.8 ± 387.4 Mly (1,696.97 ± 118.79 Mpc)
- Group or cluster: WHL J114034.4+440548
- magnitude (H): 14.82

Characteristics
- Size: ~855,000 ly (262.1 kpc) (estimated)

Other designations
- B3 1137+443, 2MASX J11403439+4405482, 2MASS J11403438+4405480, LEDA 2236498, TXS 1137+443, SDSS J114034.41+440548.1, WHL J114034.4+440548 BCG

6C B113753.5+442220 also known as J114034.4+440547, is a radio galaxy located in the constellation of Ursa Major. The redshift of the galaxy is estimated to be (z) 0.38 and it was first discovered in the Sixth Cambridge Survey of Radio Sources survey by astronomers in October 1988.

== Description ==
6C B113753.5+442220 is categorized as a luminous red galaxy (LRG) residing as the brightest cluster galaxy (BCG) of the galaxy cluster, WHL J114034.4+440548. The central supermassive black hole residing in the center of the galaxy has been estimated to be 9.13 M_{☉}. An r-band magnitude of 17.55 has been calculated for the galaxy, and the absolute magnitude is -24.51.

The nucleus is categorized as active and is classified as a Fanaroff-Riley Class Type II radio galaxy. There is a resolved radio core, while no hot spot features were detected. The total radio power at 1.4 GHz frequencies is 99 mJy and the angular size of the source is 69 arcseconds.

A study in 2013, reclassified it as a Fanaroff-Riley Class Type I radio galaxy. The galaxy also contains both hydrogen-alpha and doubly ionized oxygen emission lines with estimated luminosities of 0.000 and 7.150 L_{☉}. There are also radio lobes, with the total size of the lobes reaching a distance of 256.81 kiloparsecs. The total integrated flux density of the source calculated by NRAO VLA Sky Survey (NVSS) is estimated to be 102.00 mJy at 1.4 GHz. It is located in a rich galaxy cluster with a richness of N^{−0.19}_{0.5} ~ 40, despite being an S-shaped radio galaxy. The total extent of the source is around 0.29 megaparsecs and has a total radio luminosity of 25.72 Hz^{−1}.
