= 8C 1241+735 =

Radio galaxy in the constellation Draco

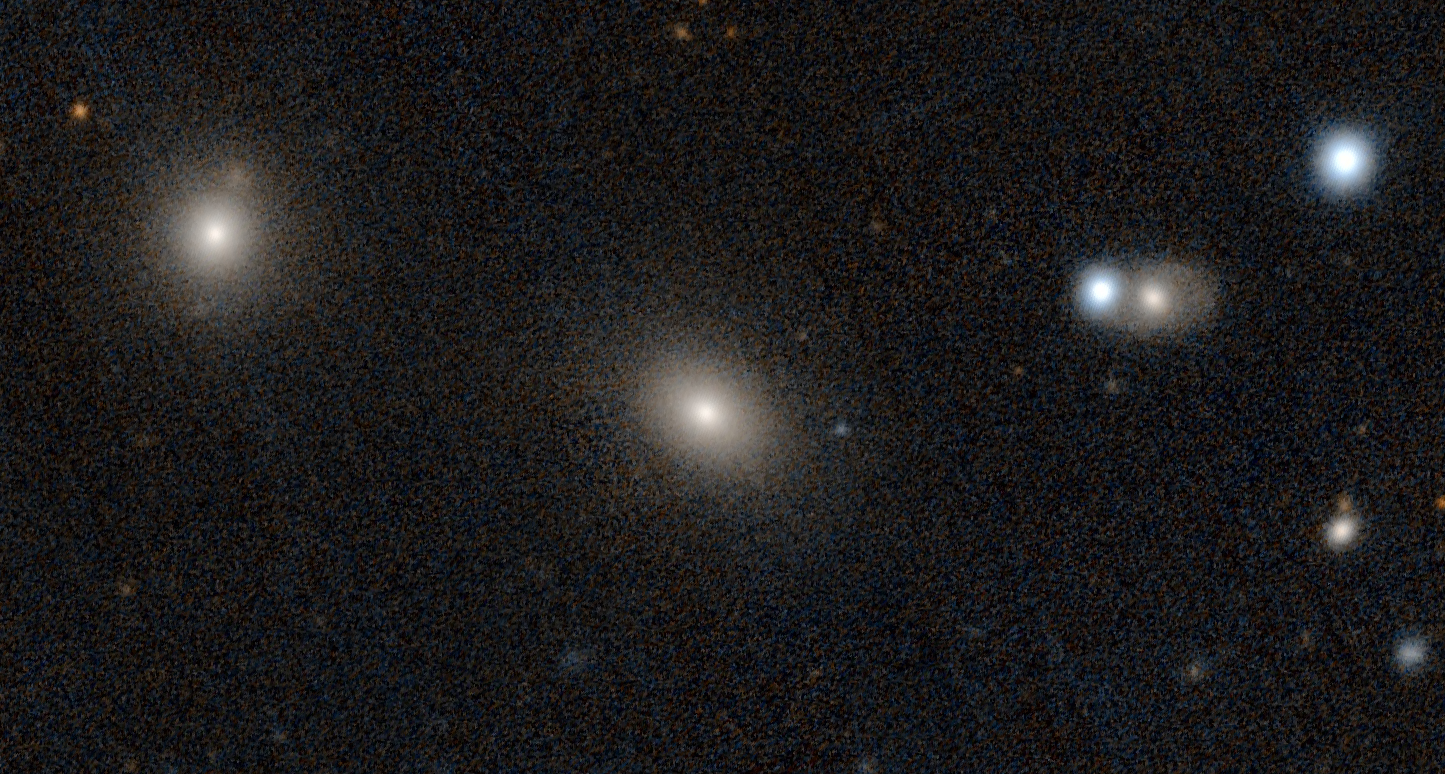
- Pan-STARRS image of the radio galaxy 8C 1241+735

Observation data (J2000 epoch)
- Constellation: Draco
- Right ascension: 12^{h} 43^{m} 11.21^{s}
- Declination: +73° 15′ 59.25″
- Redshift: 0.075000
- Heliocentric radial velocity: 22484 ± 300 km/s
- Distance: 1,088.4 ± 78.9 Mly (333.70 ± 24.18 Mpc)
- magnitude (J): 12.89

Characteristics
- Type: WLRG LINER
- Size: ~341,000 ly (104.4 kpc) (estimated)

Other designations
- 2MASX J12431131+7315593, 1241+735, LEDA 3086167, IRCF J124311.2+731559, NPM1G +73.0086, NVSS J124310+731600

8C 1241+735 is a radio galaxy located in the constellation of Draco. The redshift of the galaxy is (z) 0.075 and it was first discovered as a bright astronomical radio source by astronomers in July 1996. Subsequently, this object has been identified with a 17 magnitude galaxy according to a study by M. Stickel and H. Kuehr and contains a radio spectrum that appears mainly flat, thus the classification of it being a flat spectrum radio source.

== Description ==
8C 1241+735 is a weak emission-line radio galaxy (WLRG) belonging as a member of a small galaxy group. The host galaxy has been identified as a passive elliptical with a core-jet radio morphology. When observed with MERLIN, it has a compact radio core described to show an extended radio component that is orientated at -30°. Radio observations made with Very Large Array (VLA) identified the component as a diffused jet knot. The radio core itself, is unpolarized.

A radio jet is present. The jet is described as one-sided and has an extent of 10 arcseconds from the core with an orientation of -20° based on kiloparsec scale imaging. When imaged on parsec scales, the jet has the same one-sided appearance but however, also has the same position angle like the jet on kiloparsec scales, with a total extent of 15 milliarcseconds. Further studies also found the jet is also bending towards the direction of southwest and terminating at the position of a compact component at -95° from the nucleus region. The jet also contains polarization by 12 percent, with its polarized radio emission being offset from the western jet edge. The direction of the electric vector position angle is parallel to the jet. Further imaging also detected the galaxy contains a presence of a LINER nucleus.
