= WISEA J145223.62+611707.5 =

Radio galaxy in the constellation Draco

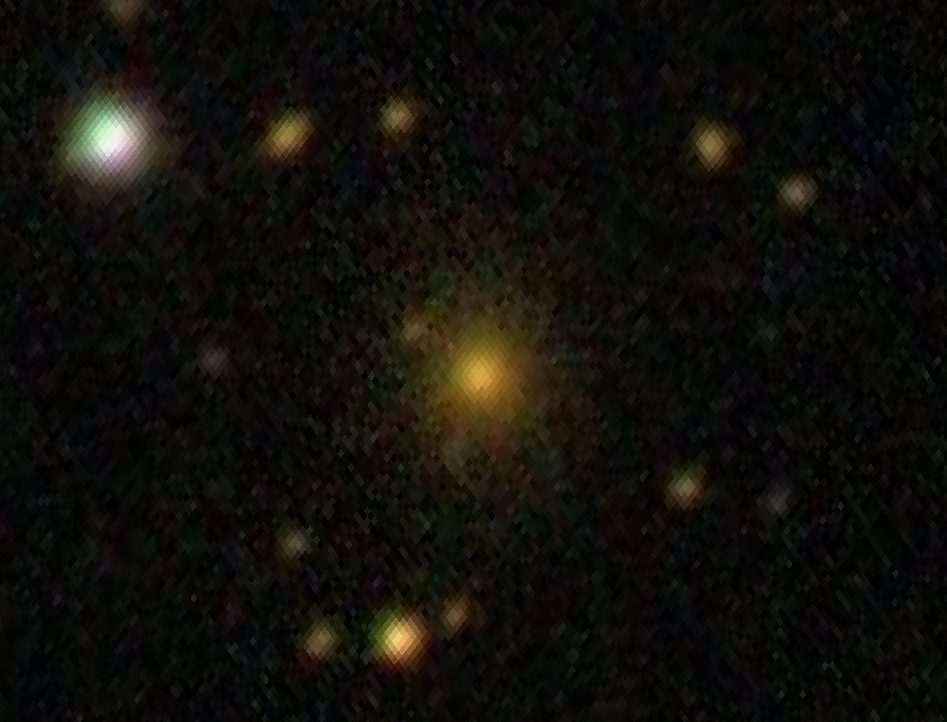
- SDSS image of WISEA J145223.62+611707.5

Observation data (J2000.0 epoch)
- Constellation: Draco
- Right ascension: 14^{h} 52^{m} 23.62^{s}
- Declination: +61° 17′ 07.55″
- Redshift: 0.278814
- Heliocentric radial velocity: 83,586 ± 16 km/s
- Distance: 4,024.0 ± 281.7 Mly (1,233.75 ± 86.36 Mpc)
- Group or cluster: WHL J145223.6+611708
- magnitude (K): 13.74

Characteristics
- Type: BrClG
- Size: ~441,500 ly (135.37 kpc) (estimated)

Other designations
- 2MASX J14522366+6117075, 6C B145113.4+612926, 8C 1451+615, [LHC2018] J223.09838+61.28548, OGC 0175, NYU-VAGC 0471699, RGZ J145223.6+611707,[PFR2025] J223.1002+61.286, WHL J145223.6+611708 BCG, LEDA 3363231

WISEA J145223.62+611707.5 also known as OGC 175 and RGZ J145223.6+611707, is a radio galaxy located in the constellation of Draco. The redshift of the galaxy is (z) 0.278 and it was first discovered in the Sixth Cambridge Catalogue of Radio Sources in September 1990.

== Description ==
WISEA J145223.62+611707.5 is categorized as an elliptical galaxy, residing as the brightest cluster galaxy of the WHL J145223.6+611708 galaxy cluster with nine confirmed galaxy member candidates. The total R-band magnitude of the galaxy is found to be 17.10 while the R-band absolute magnitude is -23.97. The mass of the supermassive black hole located in the center of the galaxy is 8.98 M_{☉}. The J-band and H-band infrared magnitudes are estimated to be 16.026 and 15.268 respectively.

The galaxy has a presence of an active galactic nucleus and it is classified as a Fanaroff-Riley Class Type II radio galaxy or a bend-tail radio galaxy containing a FRII-like radio source with the total flux density of 136.50 mJy calculated by NRAO VLA Sky Survey (NVSS) at 1.4 GHz. The total angular size of the source is found to be 67.2 arcseconds whereas the total linear size is 284.45 kiloparsecs. There are no detections of either a radio core or hotspot features. The total radio luminosity is 25.97 W Hz^{−1} at 1.4 GHz.

A study in 2025, has found it is a narrow-angle-tail radio galaxy with presence of radio jets. The opening angle of the jets is 29.5° while the curvature radius of the jets are estimated to be 7.2 arcseconds. The spectral index is 1.25α between the frequencies of 1.4 and 3 GHz. The largest angular size is 87 arcseconds while the largest linear size is 381.0 kiloparsecs. The 1.4 GHz logarithmic luminosity is 25.55 W Hz^{−1} and the flux density at 3 GHz is 49.34 mJy.

Evidence also found the source is mainly bent. Based on observations, the bending angle is 11.2° while the excess bending angle is 12.7°.
