= QSO B1038+528A =

Quasar in the constellation of Ursa Major

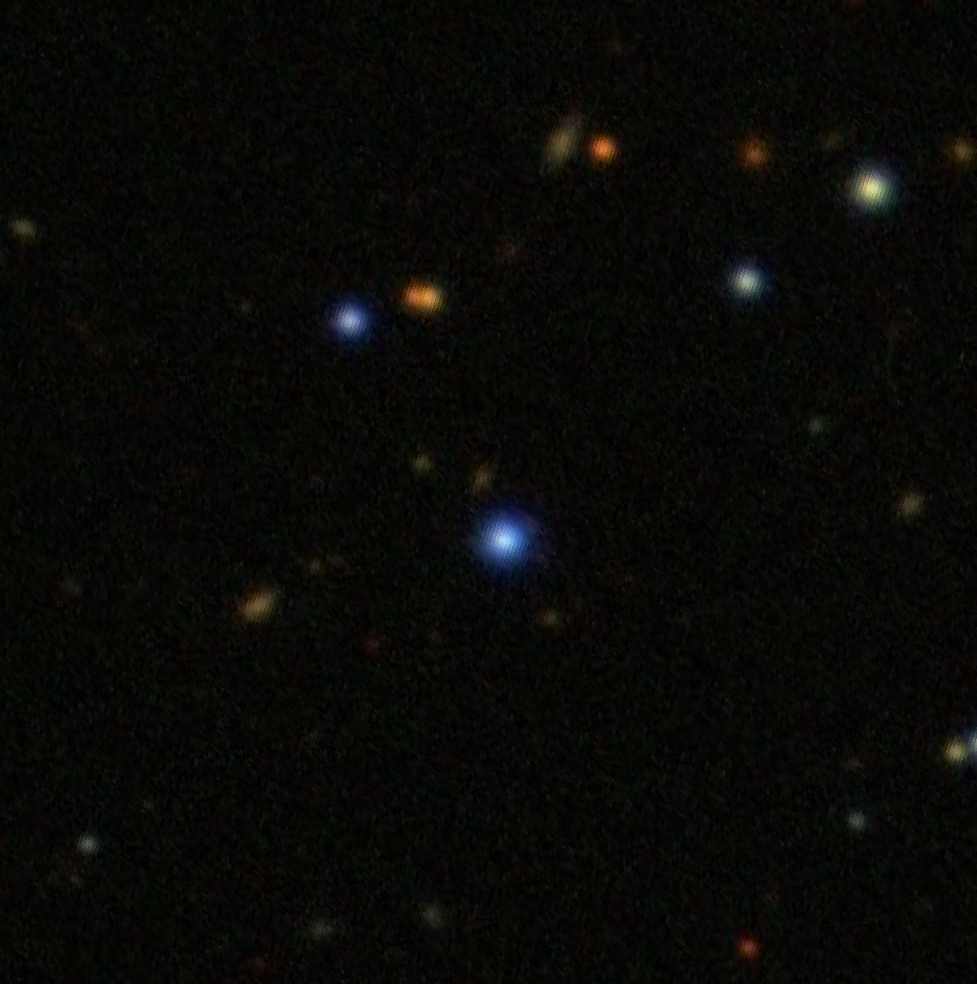
- The quasar QSO B1038+528A. On the left side of the image is QSO B1038+528B.

Observation data (J2000.0 epoch)
- Constellation: Ursa Major
- Right ascension: 10^{h} 41^{m} 46.78^{s}
- Declination: +52° 33′ 28.23″
- Redshift: 0.678425
- Heliocentric radial velocity: 203,387 km/s
- Distance: 6.367 Gly
- Apparent magnitude (V): 18.5
- Apparent magnitude (B): 16.96

Characteristics
- Type: HPQ FSRQ
- Size: ~233,000 ly (71.4 kpc) (estimated)

Other designations
- OL +564, SDSS J104146.77+523328.2, SBS 1038+538, RX J1041.7+5233, 2MASS J10414679+5233283, 6C B103844.1+524909, ICRF J104146.7+523328, JVAS J1041+5233, VIPS 0362, VLSS J1041.7+5233 PGC 3510279

QSO B1038+528A, also known as OL 564, is a radio-loud quasar located in the constellation of Ursa Major. The redshift of the quasar is (z) 0.678 and it was first discovered via a NRAO interferometer survey by a team of astronomers led by F.N. Owen in 1980, who described it along with QSO B1038+528B as an extremely close pair of quasars. The radio spectrum of the quasar is considered as flat, making it a flat-spectrum radio quasar.

== Description ==
QSO B1038+528A makes up one of the quasar pair alongside QSO B1038+528B. While the primary quasar is found to be brighter with a redshift at 0.67, the secondary quasar is faint and located at (z) 2.296. The absolute magnitude of the quasars are estimated to be 17.5 and 18.5 respectively. The separation between the quasar pair is 33 arcseconds.

The radio structure of QSO B1038+528A is compact. When observed, the radio morphology is shown to be of core-jet type with a long radio jet that is extending outwards from the radio core with a distance spanning at least 50 milliarcseconds (400 parsecs) and a position angle of 22°. This jet is also found to contain a steep spectrum. Two other components are discovered in the quasar, mainly a strong component and a much weaker component. Traces of diffused radio emission have been found to surround the quasar based on radio mapping made by the Very Large Array (VLA).

A study published in 1988 showed that QSO B1038+528A has evidence of superluminal motion. Based on observations, a component is found ejecting from the position of the core towards direction of north-east, travelling at a speed of 100 kilometers per second. The proper motion value for its core is found to be estimated as 31 ± 22 per year and it is also said to be shifting by 0.7 milliarcseconds between 2.3 and 8.4 GHz frequencies.
