= 6C B140400.6+405554 =

Radio galaxy in the constellation Canes Venatici

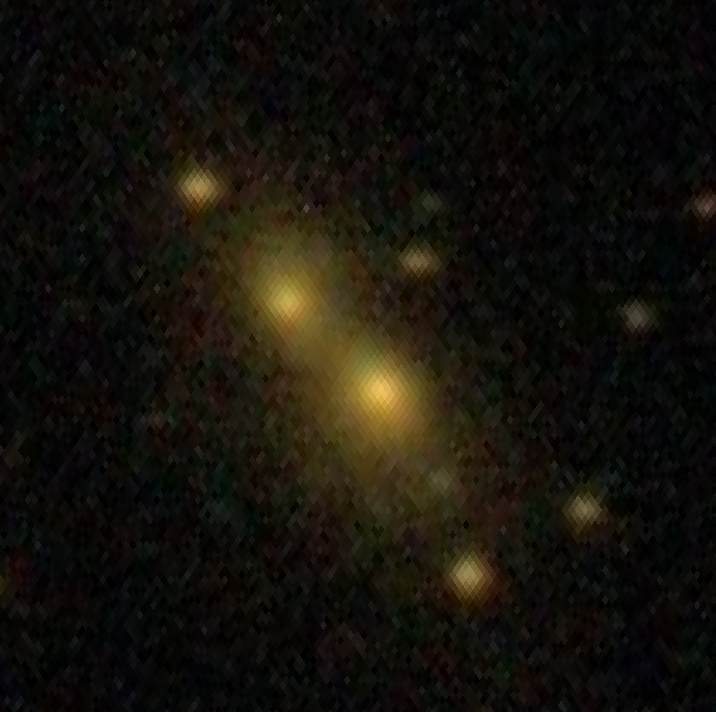
- SDSS image of 6C B140400.6+405554

Observation data (J2000.0 epoch)
- Constellation: Canes Venatici
- Right ascension: 14^{h} 06^{m} 04.08^{s}
- Declination: +40° 41′ 38.95″
- Redshift: 0.210916
- Heliocentric radial velocity: 63,231 ± 9 km/s
- Distance: 3,050.1 ± 213.5 Mly (935.16 ± 65.46 Mpc)
- Group or cluster: WHL J140604.0+404139
- magnitude (K): 13.90

Characteristics
- Type: BrClG
- Size: ~551,000 ly (168.8 kpc) (estimated)

Other designations
- 2MASX J14060404+4041387, ASK 323191.0, LRG J140604.11+404140.2, LEDA 2169565, OGC 0642, SDSS J140604.03+404138.8, WHL J140604.0+404139 BCG

6C B140400.6+405554 also known as OGC 642 and J140604.1+404140, is a radio galaxy located in the constellation of Canes Venatici. The redshift of the galaxy is (z) 0.210 and it was first discovered in the Sixth Cambridge Survey of Radio Sources in 1988 by astronomers.

== Description ==
6C B140400.6+405554 is an elliptical galaxy residing as the brightest cluster galaxy of the WHL J140604.0+404139 galaxy cluster with 20 confirmed galaxy member candidates. The R-band magnitude of the galaxy is estimated to be 16.68 magnitude while absolute magnitude is -23.54. The supermassive black hole lying in the center of the galaxy is found to be 8.77 M_{☉} although it has been suggested to be 8.76 M_{☉}.

The nucleus is found to be active and it has been classified as either a Fanaroff-Riley Class Type I radio galaxy or a bend-tail X-shaped radio galaxy with a Fanaroff-Riley Class Type II-like source. Both of the radio lobes are resolved and they are shown to reach a maximum size of 84.28 kiloparsecs while the total log radio luminosity is found to be 26.07 W Hz^{−1}. It has also been classified as a narrow-angle-tail (NAT) radio galaxy. There are detected radio jets with the opening angle estimated as 64.3° while the curvature radius of these jets are 16.2 arcseconds. The largest angular size of the source is 48 arcseconds whereas the largest linear size is 171.0 kiloparsecs. The radio flux density calculated by NRAO VLA Sky Survey (NVSS) is 261.00 mJy at 1.4 GHz frequencies while the radio spectral index is 0.98α.

The optical spectrum of the galaxy has presence of both hydrogen-alpha and doubly ionized oxygen emission lines with estimated line luminosities of 7.367 and 7.018 L_{☉} respectively. A study classified it as a C-shaped radio galaxy with a total radio luminosity of 25.58 W Hz^{−1} at 1.4 GHz frequencies and it has total extent of 0.13 megaparsecs.
