= SDSS J133020.34+621307.7 =

Radio galaxy in the constellation Ursa Major

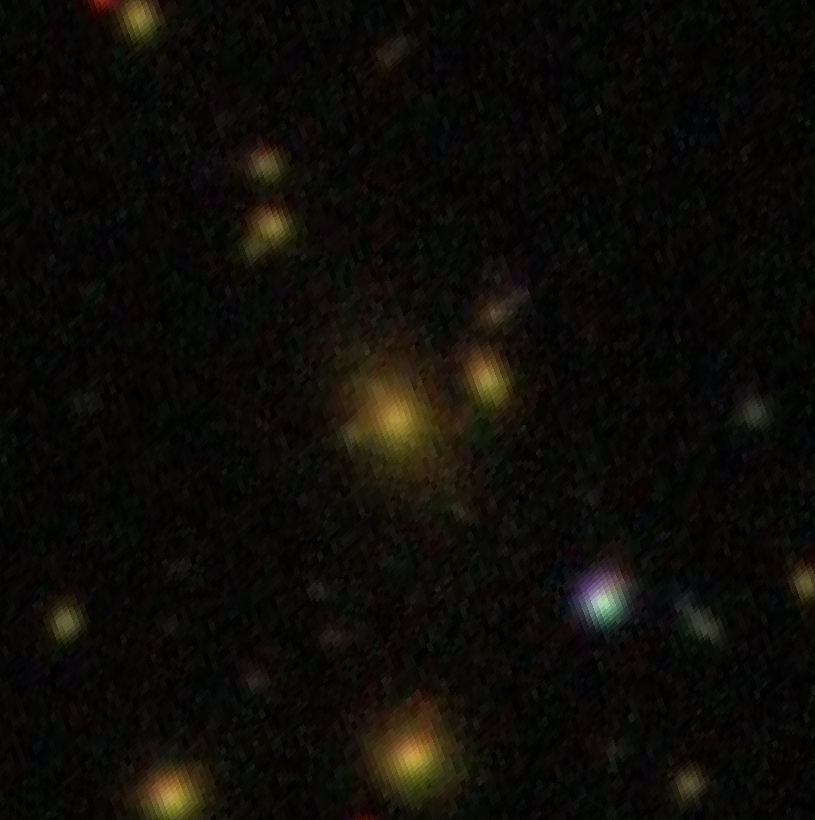
- The radio galaxy SDSS J133020.34+621307.7

Observation data (J2000.0 epoch)
- Constellation: Ursa Major
- Right ascension: 13^{h} 30^{m} 20.32^{s}
- Declination: +62° 13′ 07.84″
- Redshift: 0.239818
- Heliocentric radial velocity: 71,896 ± 14 km/s
- Distance: 3,463.5 ± 242.4 Mly (1,061.90 ± 74.33 Mpc)
- Group or cluster: WHL J133020.4+621308
- magnitude (K): 14.97

Characteristics
- Type: BrClG
- Size: ~322,000 ly (98.7 kpc) (estimated)

Other designations
- 2MASX J13302033+6213076, [LHC2018] J202.58480+62.21884, NYU-VAGC 0513820, LEDA 2632788, WHL J133020.3+621307 BCG, 6C 132835+622826, 7C 132834.89+622831.00

SDSS J133020.34+621307.7 also known as NYU-VAGC 0513820 and 6C B132835.3+622826, is a radio galaxy located in the constellation of Ursa Major. The redshift of the galaxy is (z) 0.239 and it was first discovered in the Sixth Cambridge Survey of Radio Sources in 1990 by astronomers.

== Description ==
SDSS J133020.34+621307.7 is the brightest cluster galaxy of the WHL J133020.4+621308 galaxy cluster with 38 confirmed galaxy member candidates. The R-band magnitude of the galaxy is 17.26 while the stellar velocity dispersion is found to be 226 kilometers per seconds. The galaxy effective radius is calculated to be 15.3 kiloparsecs. The R-band absolute magnitude of the galaxy is -23.20.

Its nucleus is found to be active and it is categorized as a Fanaroff-Riley Class Type II radio galaxy. The total linear size is 216.1 kiloparsecs while the angular size is 57 arcseconds. There are no detections of either a radio core or hotspot features. The radio power has been found to be 27.45 × 10^{24} WHz^{−1} while the 1.4 GHz radio flux density is 158.1 mJy. A radio jet has been detected and it has a jet power of 44.90 erg s^{−1}.

A study found the radio lobes are indeed resolved. The first lobe has a projected length of 131.4 kiloparsecs while the other lobe has a projected length of 137.7 kiloparsecs. Both of the lobes are shown to have an angular separation of 22.6 and 23.6 arcseconds respectively. The angular size of the lobes are measured to be 57 arcseconds whereas the size of the lobes are 108.05 kiloparsecs. The total radio luminosity has been estimated to be 26.8 × 10^{24} W Hz^{−1}. The R-band luminosity of the galaxy is 7.29 × 10^{10} L_{☉}.

The galaxy's optical spectrum shows presence of both hydrogen-alpha and doubly ionized oxygen emission lines with line luminosities estimated as 6.640 and 0.000 L_{☉}. A supermassive black hole is present in the center of the galaxy with a mass of 8.35 M_{☉}. The accretion disk luminosity is estimated as 43.53 erg s^{−1}.
