= ASKAP J173608.2−321635 =

Unidentified extra-terrestrial radio source

- Object type: Radio source
- Other designations: Andy's Object

Observation data (Epoch J2000)
- Constellation: Scorpius
- Right ascension: 17^{h} 36^{m} 08.2^{s}
- Declination: −32° 16′ 35″
- Distance: ~10 kpc

ASKAP J173608.2−321635 is an unidentified astronomical radio source located in the Galactic Center of the Milky Way. It is nicknamed "Andy's Object" after its discoverer, Ziteng (Andy) Wang, from the University of Sydney in Australia. The object was detected using the Australian Square Kilometer Array Pathfinder and MeerKAT radio telescopes. It is not visible to "the most powerful non-radio telescopes" and was detected six times between January and September 2020. This may be a new class of object because no counterpart has been detected at multiple wavelengths, which "rules out flaring stars, binary systems, NSs, GRBs, or supernovae as its source". The radio emissions exhibit a high level of polarization, suggesting scattering as a result of a black hole.

== Observations ==
The source appeared six times in 2020 during radio observations near the center of the Milky Way, then vanished from the areas typically monitored by astronomers. Follow-up observations in X-ray and near-infrared wavelengths revealed no counterpart. The radio signal itself was variable, highly polarized, and difficult to classify, reaching a peak flux density of 5.6 millijanskys.

== Radio telescope ==
Mr. Wang and an international team—including scientists from Australia’s national science agency (CSIRO) as well as from Germany, the United States, Canada, South Africa, Spain, and France—discovered the object using CSIRO’s ASKAP radio telescope in Western Australia. Additional observations were conducted using the MeerKAT radio telescope at the South African Radio Astronomy Observatory.

== Research ==
The researchers received funding and support from the following organizations: the Australian Research Council, the U.S. National Science Foundation, the European Research Council, the Natural Sciences and Engineering Research Council of Canada, and the University of Sydney’s Sydney Informatics Hub.

== Imaging ==
ASKAP J173608.2-321635 could represent a member of a new class of objects discovered through radio imaging surveys.

== Supersonic star ==
The characteristics of ASKAP J173608.2-321635 are consistent with a highly supersonic neutron star interacting with a changing environment.
