= 4C +41.17 =

Radio galaxy in the constellation Auriga

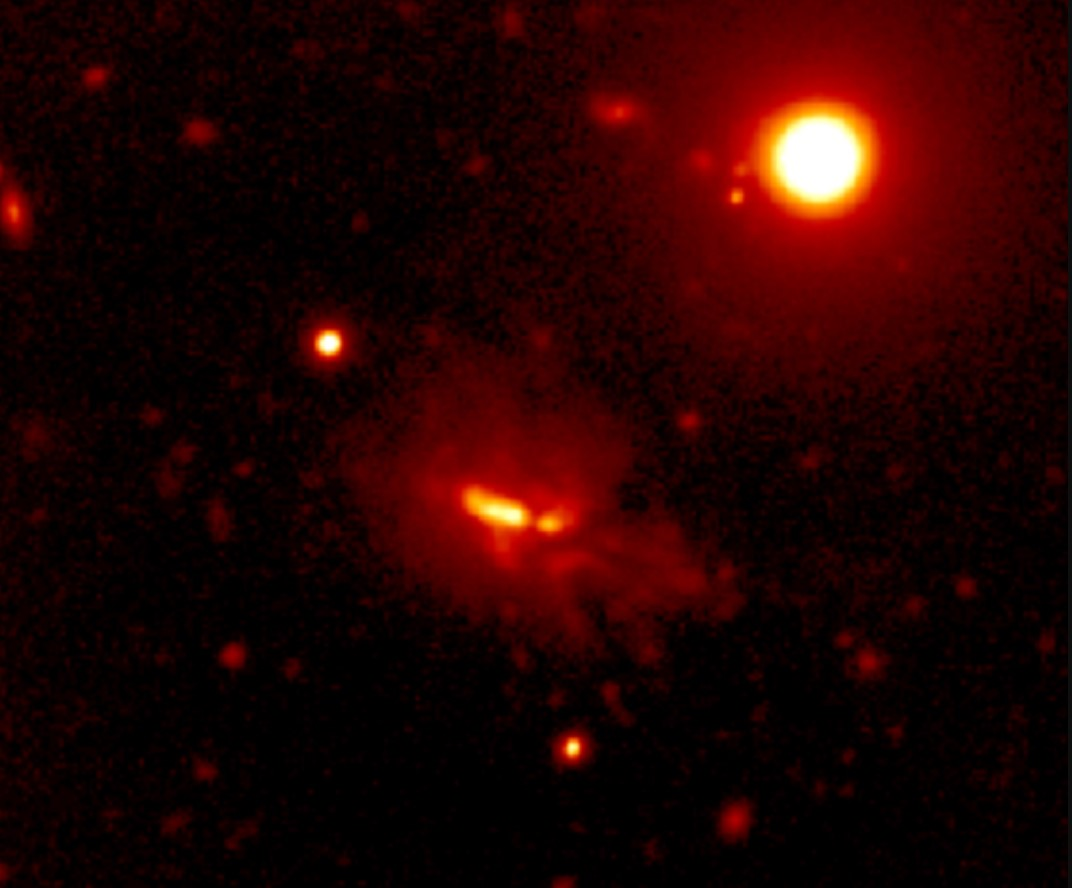
- 4C +41.17 captured by W. M. Keck Observatory

Observation data (J2000.0 epoch)
- Constellation: Auriga
- Right ascension: 06h 50m 52.09s
- Declination: +41d 30m 30.53s
- Redshift: 3.792000
- Heliocentric radial velocity: 1,136,813 km/s
- Distance: 11.665 billion Gly (light travel time distance)
- Apparent magnitude (V): 0.344
- Apparent magnitude (B): 0.455
- Surface brightness: 21.7
- Notable features: Radio galaxy, starburst galaxy, luminous infrared galaxy

Other designations
- INTREF 315, PGC 2820698, NVSS J065052+413027, 6C B064720.6+413402, 7C 0647+4134, TXS 0647+415, B3 0647+415, SMM J065052.1+413030

4C +41.17 is a radio galaxy located in the constellation Auriga. With the redshift of 3.79, it is located nearly 11.7 billion light-years from Earth. At the time of its discovery in 1988, it was one of the most distant galaxies ever seen.

== Characteristics ==
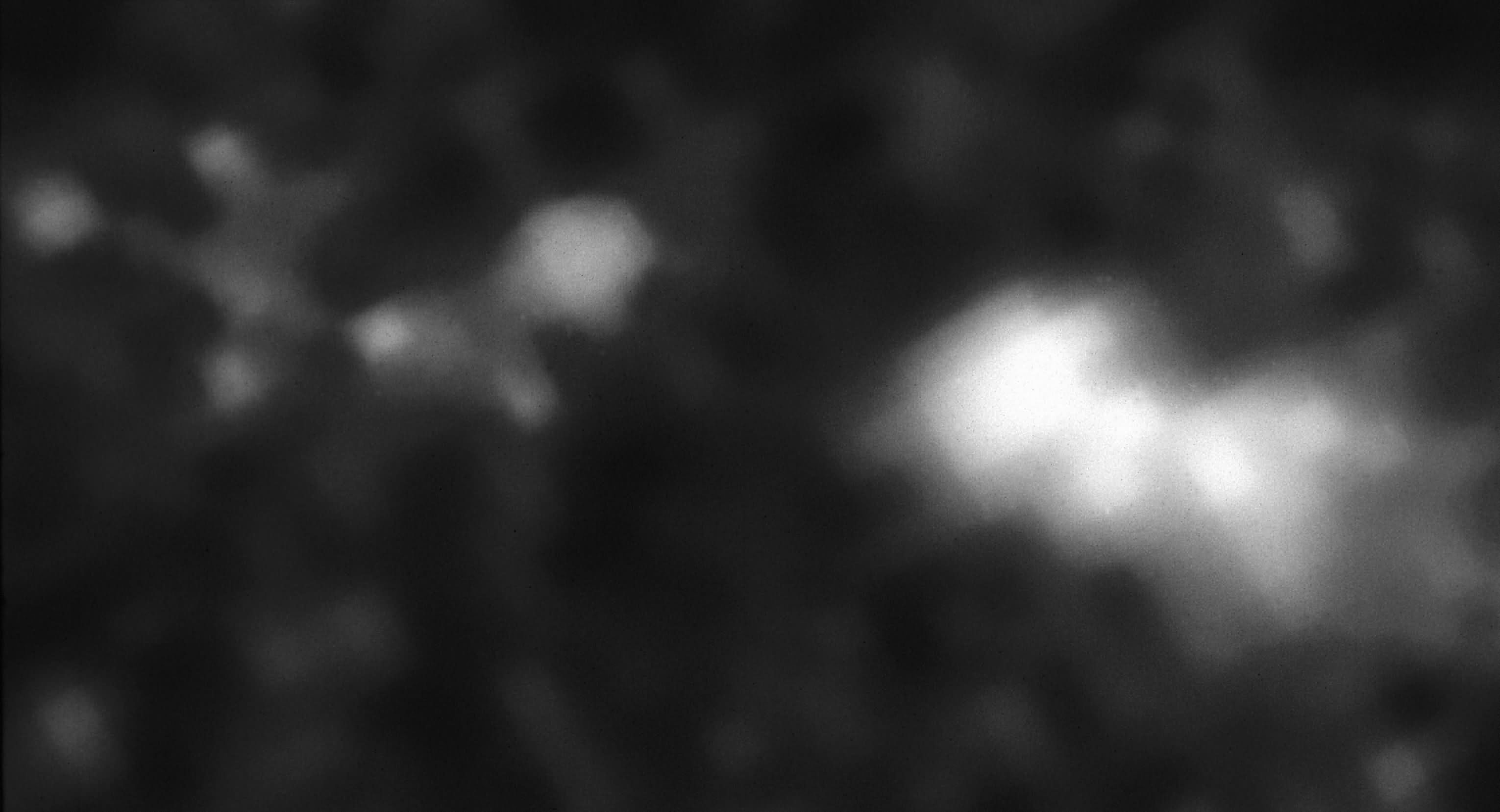
Hubble Space Telescope image of 4C +41.17

4C +41.17 is classified as a high redshift radio galaxy in the early universe with a presence of an ultra steep radio spectrum. The source of the galaxy is powerful with its astrophysical jet driving shock waves that enhances the star formation.

4C +41.17 is categorized as hyperluminous infrared galaxy. The radio luminosity of this galaxy has been estimated as 29.18 x 10^{27.5} watts per hertz. The total infrared luminosity has been found to be calculated as 1013 L_{☉} The central dust lane is shown to contain massive amounts of interstellar dust.

An observation using the IRAM 30m telescope in Spain, has found presence of least two carbon oxide (CO) systems in 4C +41.17. One of the CO component is shown coinciding with the central core while the other is situated at the base of a cone-shaped region, southwest from the galaxy's nucleus. This evidence suggests it underwent a recent galaxy merger. Extended X-ray emission has also been detected in addition. A region of faint radio emission is shown elongating from the nuclear region by 5.3 kiloparsecs. Deep spectropolarimetric observations with the W. M. Keck Telescope has also shown the ultraviolet emission of galaxy is mainly unpolarized.
