= Eighth Cambridge Survey of Radio Sources =

Astronomical catalogue

The 8C Survey (8C) or Rees 38 MHz survey is an astronomical catalogue of celestial radio sources as measured at 38 MHz. It was published in 1990 by the Radio Astronomy Group of the University of Cambridge. Sources are labelled 8C HHMM+DDd where HHMM is the Right Ascension in hours and minutes, and DDd is the Declination in degrees and tenths of a degree, e.g. 8C 0014+861 for a source at Right Ascension 00 14 and 86.1 degrees Declination in 1950 coordinates.
