= Astronomical radio source =

Object in outer space which strongly emits radio waves

An astronomical radio source is an object in outer space that emits strong radio waves. Radio emission comes from a wide variety of sources. Such objects are among the most extreme and energetic physical processes in the universe.

== History ==
In 1932, American physicist and radio engineer Karl Jansky detected radio waves coming from an unknown source in the center of the Milky Way galaxy. Jansky was studying the origins of radio frequency interference for Bell Laboratories. He found "...a steady hiss type static of unknown origin", which eventually he concluded had an extraterrestrial origin. This was the first time that radio waves were detected from outer space. The first radio sky survey was conducted by Grote Reber and was completed in 1941. In the 1970s, some stars in the Milky Way were found to be radio emitters, one of the strongest being the unique binary MWC 349.

== Sources: Solar System ==
=== The Sun ===
As the nearest star, the Sun is the brightest radiation source in most frequencies, down to the radio spectrum at 300 MHz (1 m wavelength). When the Sun is quiet, the galactic background noise dominates at longer wavelengths. During geomagnetic storms, the Sun will dominate even at these low frequencies.

=== Jupiter ===
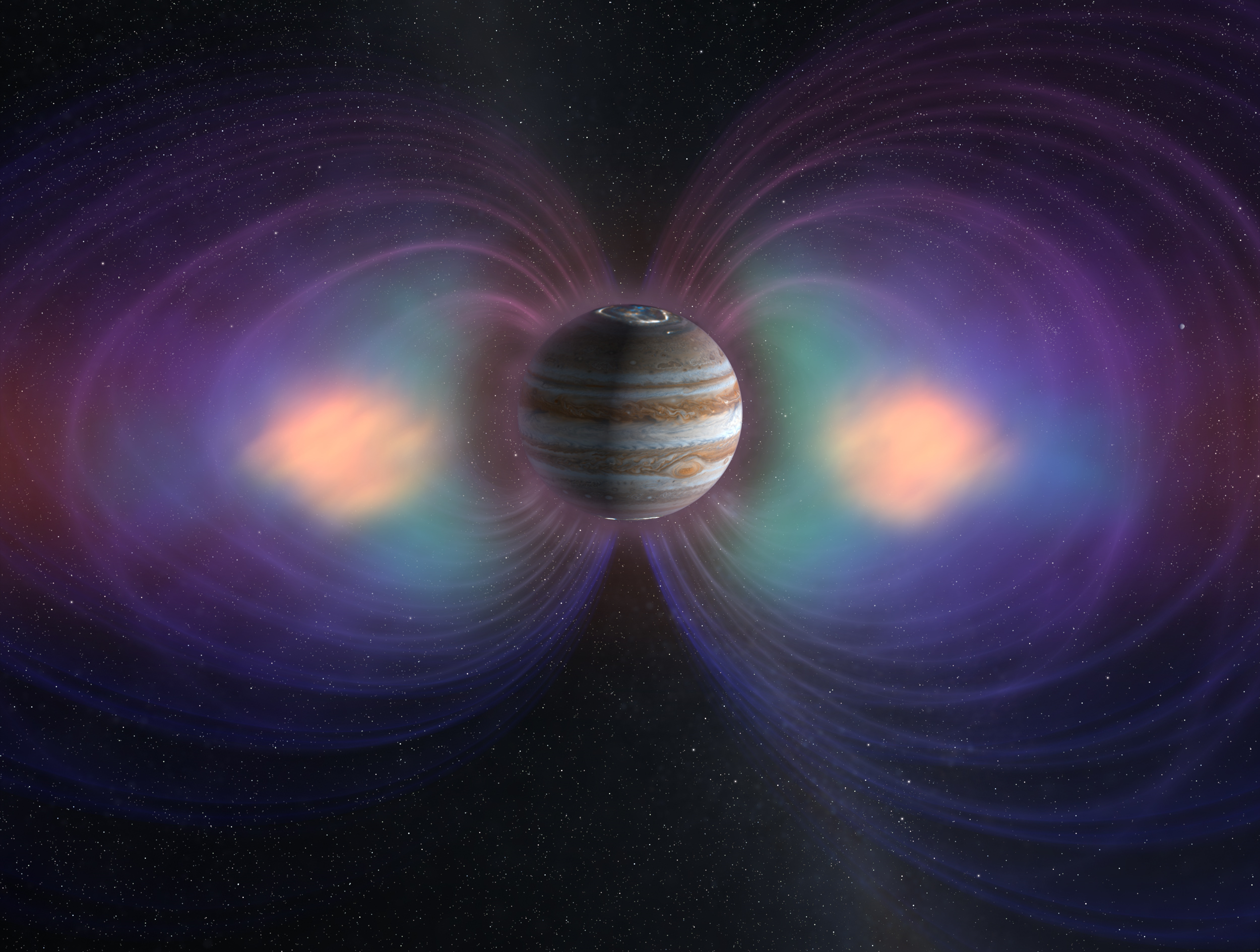
Magnetosphere of Jupiter

Oscillation of electrons trapped in the magnetosphere of Jupiter produce strong radio signals, particularly bright in the decimeter band.

The magnetosphere of Jupiter is responsible for intense episodes of radio emission from the planet's polar regions. Volcanic activity on Jupiter's moon Io injects gas into Jupiter's magnetosphere, producing a torus of particles about the planet. As Io moves through this torus, the interaction generates Alfvén waves that carry ionized matter into the polar regions of Jupiter. As a result, radio waves are generated through a cyclotron maser mechanism, and the energy is transmitted out along a cone-shaped surface. When Earth intersects this cone, the radio emissions from Jupiter can exceed the solar radio output.

=== Ganymede ===
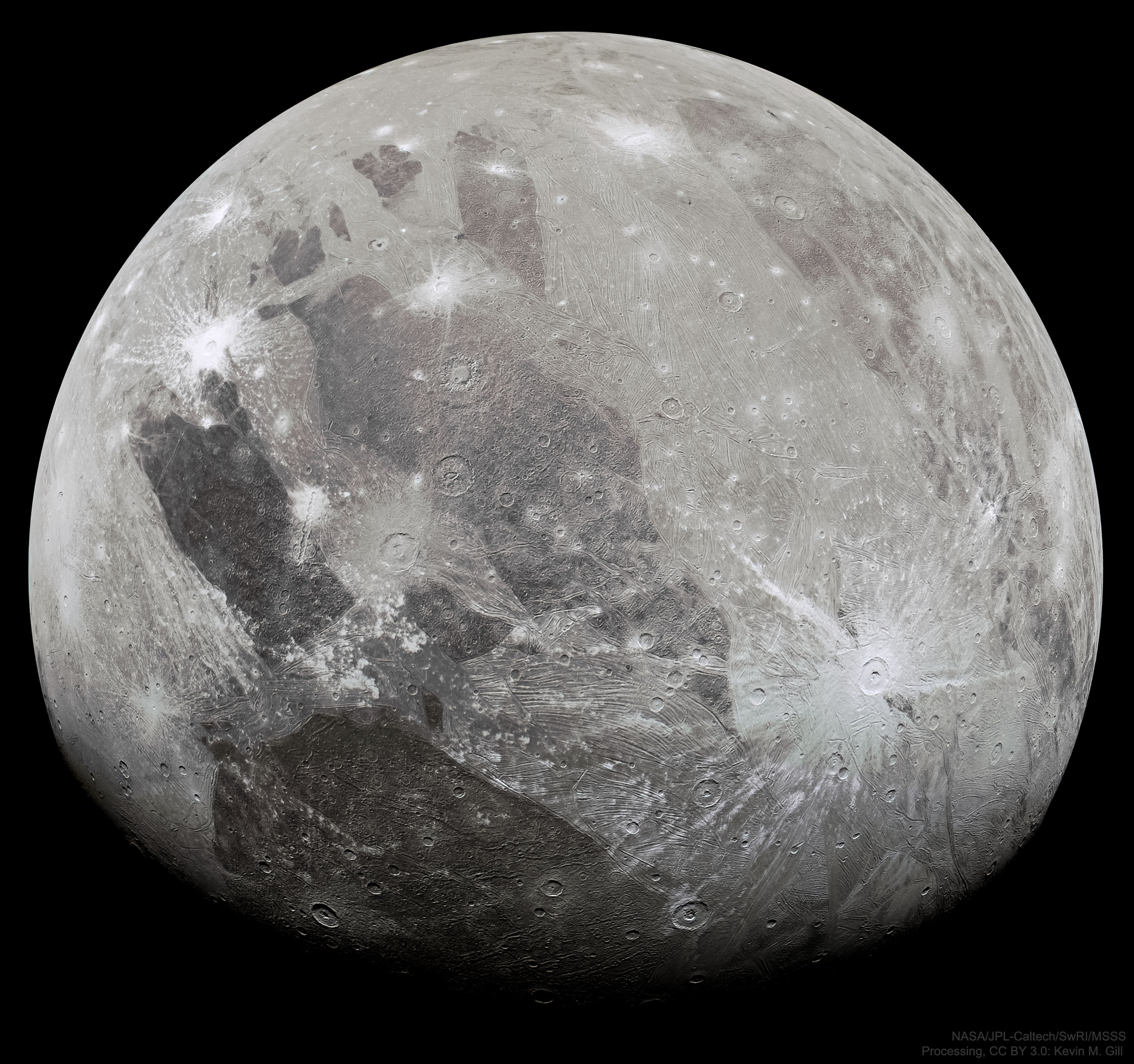
Jupiter's moon Ganymede

In 2021 news outlets reported that scientists, with the Juno spacecraft that orbits Jupiter since 2016, detected an FM radio signal from the moon Ganymede at a location where the planet's magnetic field lines connect with those of its moon. According to the reports these were caused by cyclotron maser instability and were similar to both WiFi-signals and Jupiter's radio emissions. A study about the radio emissions was published in September 2020 but did not describe them to be of FM nature or similar to WiFi signals.

== Sources: Galactic ==
=== The Galactic Center ===
The center of the Milky Way was the first radio source to be detected. It contains a number of radio sources, including Sagittarius A, the compact region around the supermassive black hole, Sagittarius A*, as well as the black hole itself. When flaring, the accretion disk around the supermassive black hole lights up, detectable in radio waves.

In the 2000s, three Galactic Center Radio Transients (GCRTs) were detected: GCRT J1746–2757, GCRT J1745–3009, and GCRT J1742–3001. In addition, ASKAP J173608.2-321635, which was detected six times in 2020, may be a fourth GCRT.

Region around the Galactic Center

In 2021, astronomers reported the detection of peculiar, highly circularly polarized intermittent radio waves from near the Galactic Center whose unidentified source could represent a new class of astronomical objects with a GCRT so far not "fully explain[ing] the observations".

=== Supernova remnants ===
Supernova remnants often show diffuse radio emission. Examples include Cassiopeia A, the brightest extrasolar radio source in the sky, and the Crab Nebula.

=== Neutron stars ===
==== Pulsars ====
Schematic view of a pulsar. The sphere in the middle represents the neutron star, the curves indicate the magnetic field lines, the protruding cones represent the emission beams and the green line represents the axis on which the star rotates.

Supernovae sometimes leave behind dense spinning neutron stars called pulsars. They emit jets of charged particles which emit synchrotron radiation in the radio spectrum. Examples include the Crab Pulsar, the first pulsar to be discovered. Pulsars and quasars (dense central cores of extremely distant galaxies) were both discovered by radio astronomers. In 2003 astronomers using the Parkes radio telescope discovered two pulsars orbiting each other, the first such system known.

==== Rotating Radio Transient (RRAT) Sources ====
Rotating radio transients (RRATs) are a type of neutron stars discovered in 2006 by a team led by Maura McLaughlin from the Jodrell Bank Observatory at the University of Manchester in the UK. RRATs are believed to produce radio emissions which are very difficult to locate, because of their transient nature. Early efforts have been able to detect radio emissions (sometimes called RRAT flashes) for less than one second a day, and, like with other single-burst signals, one must take great care to distinguish them from terrestrial radio interference. Distributing computing and the Astropulse algorithm may thus lend itself to further detection of RRATs.

=== Star forming regions ===
Short radio waves are emitted from complex molecules in dense clouds of gas where stars are being born.

Spiral galaxies contain clouds of neutral hydrogen and carbon monoxide which emit radio waves. The radio frequencies of these two molecules were used to map a large portion of the Milky Way galaxy.

== Sources: extra-galactic ==
=== Radio galaxies ===
Many galaxies are strong radio emitters, called radio galaxies. Some of the more notable are Centaurus A and Messier 87.

Quasars (short for "quasi-stellar radio source") were one of the first point-like radio sources to be discovered. Quasars' extreme redshift led us to conclude that they are distant active galactic nuclei, believed to be powered by black holes. Active galactic nuclei have jets of charged particles which emit synchrotron radiation. One example is 3C 273, the optically brightest quasar in the sky.

Merging galaxy clusters often show diffuse radio emission.

=== Cosmic microwave background ===
The cosmic microwave background is blackbody background radiation left over from the Big Bang (the rapid expansion, roughly 13.8 billion years ago, that was the beginning of the universe.

=== Extragalactic pulses - Fast Radio Burst ===
D. R. Lorimer and others analyzed archival survey data and found a 30-jansky dispersed burst, less than 5 milliseconds in duration, located 3° from the Small Magellanic Cloud. They reported that the burst properties argue against a physical association with our Galaxy or the Small Magellanic Cloud. In a recent paper, they argue that current models for the free electron content in the universe imply that the burst is less than 1 gigaparsec distant. The fact that no further bursts were seen in 90 hours of additional observations implies that it was a singular event such as a supernova or coalescence (fusion) of relativistic objects. It is suggested that hundreds of similar events could occur every day and, if detected, could serve as cosmological probes. Radio pulsar surveys such as Astropulse-SETI@home offer one of the few opportunities to monitor the radio sky for impulsive burst-like events with millisecond durations. Because of the isolated nature of the observed phenomenon, the nature of the source remains speculative. Possibilities include a black hole-neutron star collision, a neutron star-neutron star collision, a black hole-black hole collision, or some phenomenon not yet considered.

In 2010 there was a new report of 16 similar pulses from the Parkes Telescope which were clearly of terrestrial origin, but in 2013 four pulse sources were identified that supported the likelihood of a genuine extragalactic pulsing population.

These pulses are known as fast radio bursts (FRBs). The first observed burst has become known as the Lorimer burst. Blitzars are one proposed explanation for them.

== Sources: not yet observed ==
=== Primordial black holes ===
According to the Big Bang Model, during the first few moments after the Big Bang, pressure and temperature were extremely great. Under these conditions, simple fluctuations in the density of matter may have resulted in local regions dense enough to create black holes. Although most regions of high density would be quickly dispersed by the expansion of the universe, a primordial black hole would be stable, persisting to the present.

One goal of Astropulse is to detect postulated mini black holes that might be evaporating due to "Hawking radiation". Such mini black holes are postulated to have been created during the Big Bang, unlike currently known black holes. Martin Rees has theorized that a black hole, exploding via Hawking radiation, might produce a signal that's detectable in the radio. The Astropulse project hopes that this evaporation would produce radio waves that Astropulse can detect. The evaporation wouldn't create radio waves directly. Instead, it would create an expanding fireball of high-energy gamma rays and particles. This fireball would interact with the surrounding magnetic field, pushing it out and generating radio waves.

=== ET ===
Previous searches by various "search for extraterrestrial intelligence" (SETI) projects, starting with Project Ozma, have looked for extraterrestrial communications in the form of narrow-band signals, analogous to our own radio stations. The Astropulse project argues that since we know nothing about how ET might communicate, this might be a bit closed-minded. Thus, the Astropulse Survey can be viewed as complementary to the narrow-band SETI@home survey as a by-product of the search for physical phenomena.

=== Other undiscovered phenomena ===
Explaining their discovery in 2005 of a powerful bursting radio source, NRL astronomer Dr. Joseph Lazio stated: "Amazingly, even though the sky is known to be full of transient objects emitting at X- and gamma-ray wavelengths, very little has been done to look for radio bursts, which are often easier for astronomical objects to produce." The use of coherent dedispersion algorithms and the computing power provided by the SETI network may lead to discovery of previously undiscovered phenomena.

== See also ==
- Active galactic nucleus
- Astrometry
- Electromagnetic radiation
- Radio astronomy
- Astrophysical X-ray source
