= Jansky =

Unit of spectral flux density

jansky
- Unit system: non-SI metric unit
- Unit of: spectral flux density
- Symbol: Jy
- Named after: Karl Guthe Jansky

Conversions
1 Jy in ...	... is equal to ...
- SI units: 10^{−26} W⋅m^{−2}⋅Hz^{−1}
- CGS units: 10^{−23} erg⋅s^{−1}⋅cm^{−2}⋅Hz^{−1}

The jansky (symbol Jy, plural janskys) is a non-SI unit of spectral flux density, or spectral irradiance, used especially in radio astronomy. It is equivalent to 10^{−26} watts per square metre per hertz.

The spectral flux density or monochromatic flux, S, of a source is the integral of the spectral radiance, B, over the source solid angle: $S = \iint\limits_\text{source} B(\theta,\phi) \,\mathrm{d}\Omega.$

The unit is named after pioneering US radio astronomer Karl Guthe Jansky and is defined as

- $1~\mathrm{Jy} = 10^{-26}~\mathrm{W}{\cdot}\mathrm{m^{-2}}{\cdot}\mathrm{Hz^{-1}}$ (SI)
- $1~\mathrm{Jy} = 10^{-23}~\mathrm{erg}{\cdot}\mathrm{s^{-1}}{\cdot}\mathrm{cm^{-2}}{\cdot}\mathrm{Hz^{-1}}$ (CGS).

Since the jansky is obtained by integrating over the whole source solid angle, it is most simply used to describe point sources; for example, the Third Cambridge Catalogue of Radio Sources (3C) reports results in janskys.

- For extended sources, the surface brightness is often described with units of janskys per solid angle; for example, far-infrared (FIR) maps from the IRAS satellite are in megajanskys per steradian (MJy⋅sr^{−1}).
- Although extended sources at all wavelengths can be reported with these units, for radio-frequency maps, extended sources have traditionally been described in terms of a brightness temperature; for example the Haslam et al. 408 MHz all-sky continuum survey is reported in terms of a brightness temperature in kelvin.

== Unit conversions ==
Jansky units are not a standard SI unit, so it may be necessary to convert the measurements made in the unit to the SI equivalent in terms of watts per square metre per hertz (W·m^{−2}·Hz^{−1}). However, other unit conversions are possible with respect to measuring this unit.

=== AB magnitude ===
The flux density in janskys can be converted to a magnitude basis, for suitable assumptions about the spectrum. For instance, converting an AB magnitude to a flux density in microjanskys is straightforward: $S_v~[\mathrm{\mu}\text{Jy}] = 10^{6} \cdot 10^{23} \cdot 10^{-\tfrac{\text{AB} + 48.6}{2.5}} = 10^\tfrac{23.9 - \text{AB}}{2.5}.$

=== dBW·m^{−2}·Hz^{−1} ===
The linear flux density in janskys can be converted to a decibel basis, suitable for use in fields of telecommunication and radio engineering.

1 jansky is equal to −260 dBW·m^{−2}·Hz^{−1}, or −230 dBm·m^{−2}·Hz^{−1}:
$$\begin{align}
P_{\text{dBW}\cdot\text{m}^{-2} \cdot \text{Hz}^{-1}} &= 10 \log_{10}\left(P_\text{Jy}\right) - 260, \\
P_{\text{dBm}\cdot\text{m}^{-2} \cdot \text{Hz}^{-1}} &= 10 \log_{10}\left(P_\text{Jy}\right) - 230.
\end{align}$$

=== Temperature units ===
The spectral radiance in janskys per steradian can be converted to a brightness temperature, useful in radio and microwave astronomy.

Starting with Planck's law, we see $B_{\nu} = \frac{2h\nu^3}{c^2}\frac{1}{e^{h\nu/kT}-1}.$ This can be solved for temperature, giving $T = \frac{h\nu}{k\ln\left (1+\frac{2h\nu^3}{B_\nu c^2}\right )}.$ In the low-frequency, high-temperature regime, when $h\nu \ll kT$, we can use the asymptotic expression: $T\sim \frac{h\nu}k\left(\frac{B_\nu c^2}{2h\nu^3}+\frac 12\right).$

A less accurate form is $T_b = \frac{B_{\nu}c^2}{2k\nu^2},$ which can be derived from the Rayleigh–Jeans law $B_{\nu} = \frac{2\nu^2 kT}{c^2}.$

== Usage ==
The flux to which the jansky refers can be in any form of radiant energy.

It was created for and is still most frequently used in reference to electromagnetic energy, especially in the context of radio astronomy.

The brightest astronomical radio sources have flux densities of the order of 1–100 janskys. For example, the Third Cambridge Catalogue of Radio Sources lists some 300 to 400 radio sources in the Northern Hemisphere brighter than 9 Jy at 159 MHz. This range makes the jansky a suitable unit for radio astronomy.

Gravitational waves also carry energy, so their flux density can also be expressed in terms of janskys. Typical signals on Earth are expected to be 10^{20} Jy or more. However, because of the poor coupling of gravitational waves to matter, such signals are difficult to detect.

When measuring broadband continuum emissions, where the energy is roughly evenly distributed across the detector bandwidth, the detected signal will increase in proportion to the bandwidth of the detector (as opposed to signals with bandwidth narrower than the detector bandpass). To calculate the flux density in janskys, the total power detected (in watts) is divided by the receiver collecting area (in square meters), and then divided by the detector bandwidth (in hertz). The flux density of astronomical sources is many orders of magnitude below 1 W·m^{−2}·Hz^{−1}, so the result is multiplied by 10^{26} to get a more appropriate unit for natural astrophysical phenomena.

The millijansky, mJy, was sometimes referred to as a milli-flux unit (mfu) in older astronomical literature.

== Orders of magnitude ==
Value (Jy)	Source
110000000	Radio-frequency interference from a GSM telephone transmitting 0.5 W at 1.8 GHz at a distance of 1 km (RSSI of −70 dBm)
20000000	Disturbed Sun at 20 MHz (Karl Guthe Jansky's initial discovery, published in 1933)
4000000	Sun at 10 GHz
1600000	Sun at 1.4 GHz
1000000	Milky Way at 20 MHz
10000	1 solar flux unit
2000	Milky Way at 10 GHz
1000	Quiet Sun at 20 MHz

Note: Unless noted, all values are as seen from the Earth's surface.
