= Sixth Cambridge Survey of Radio Sources =

Astronomical catalogue

Sixth Cambridge Survey of radio sources
- Alternative names: 6C

The 6C Survey of Radio Sources (6C) is an astronomical catalogue of celestial radio sources as measured at 151-MHz. It was published between 1985 and 1993 by the Radio Astronomy Group of the University of Cambridge.

The research that led to the catalogue's production also led to improvements in radio telescope design and, in due course, to the 7C survey of radio sources.

A similar survey of the Southern Hemisphere was made by the Mauritius Radio Telescope.
