= NGC 4580 =

Galaxy in the constellation Virgo

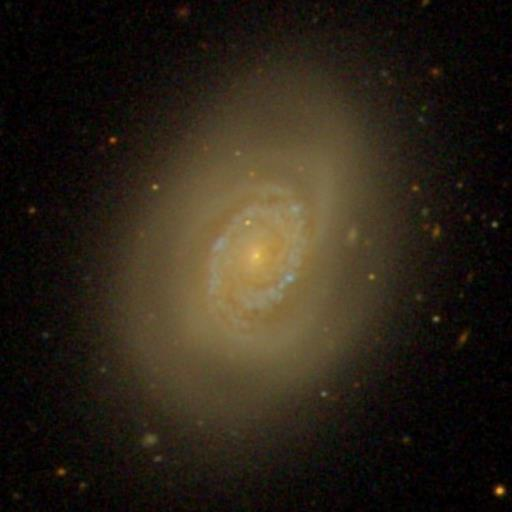
- SDSS image of NGC 4580

Observation data (J2000 epoch)
- Constellation: Virgo
- Right ascension: 12^{h} 37^{m} 48.4^{s}
- Declination: 05° 22′ 07″
- Redshift: 0.003449
- Heliocentric radial velocity: 1034 km/s
- Distance: 69.35 Mly (21.263 Mpc)
- Group or cluster: Virgo Cluster
- Apparent magnitude (V): 12.7

Characteristics
- Type: SAB(rs)a pec, LINER
- Size: ~52,400 ly (16.08 kpc) (estimated)
- Apparent size (V): 2.28 x 1.45

Other designations
- CGCG 42-183, IRAS 12352+0538, MCG 1-32-117, PGC 42174, UGC 7794, VCC 1730

NGC 4580 is an unbarred spiral galaxy located about 70 million light-years away in the constellation Virgo. NGC 4580 is also classified as a LINER galaxy. It was discovered by astronomer William Herschel on February 2, 1786 and is a member of the Virgo Cluster.

== Physical characteristics ==
NGC 4580 consists of a ringed structure. The inner pseudoring of the galaxy is very well-defined and is made of two tightly wound spiral arms. Three very diffuse spiral arms which are partly defined by dust, split off from the inner pseudoring.

=== Truncated disk ===
NGC 4580 has a severely truncated star-forming disk. This may be due to ram-pressure stripping caused by the infall of the Messier 49 subcluster into the Virgo Cluster. Due to the truncation of the star forming disk, NGC 4580 is classified as an anemic galaxy.

== See also ==
- List of NGC objects (4001–5000)
- NGC 4689
- Messier 90
