= NGC 4689 =

Galaxy in the constellation Coma Berenices

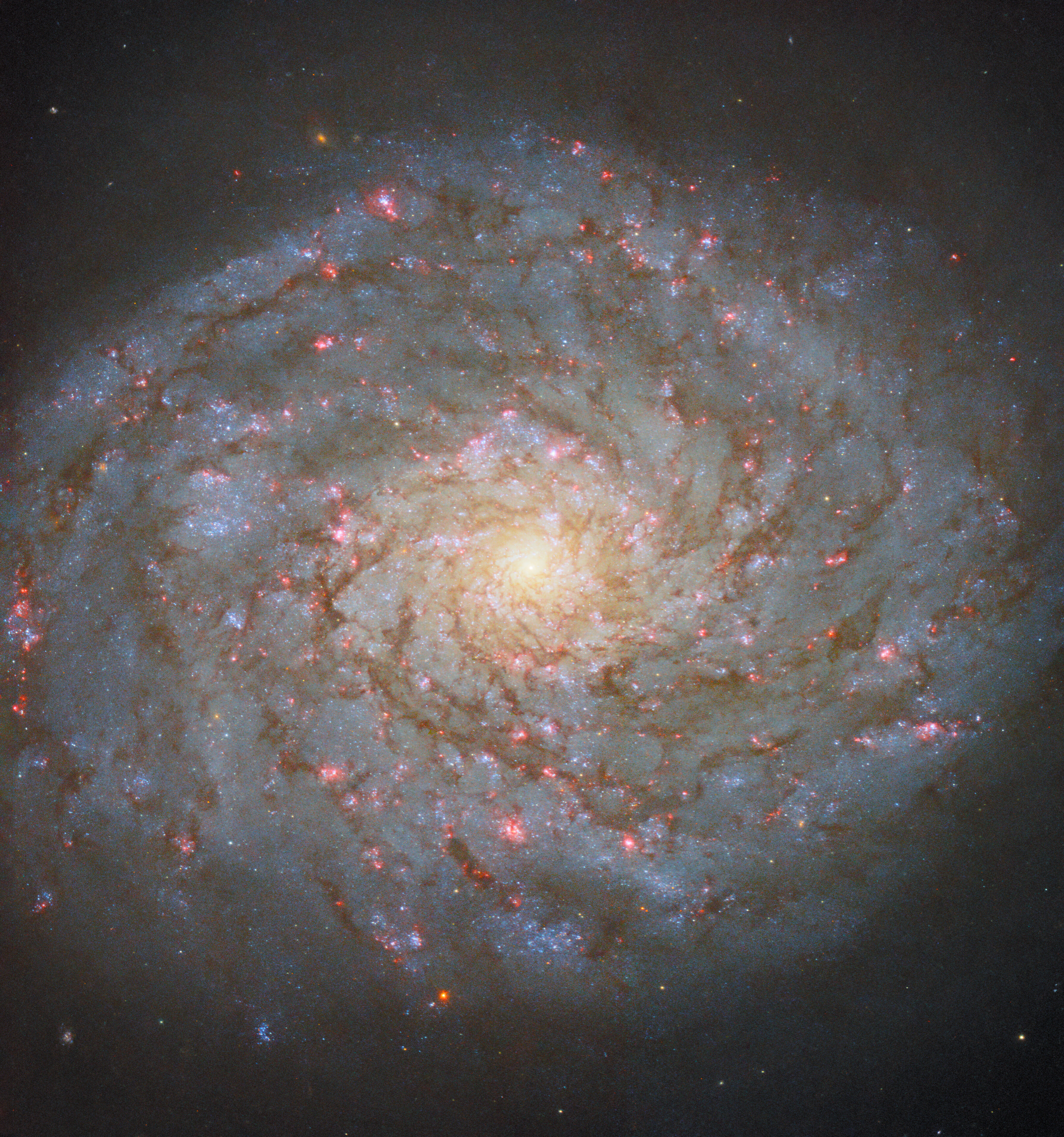
- Hubble image of NGC 4689.

Observation data (J2000 epoch)
- Constellation: Coma Berenices
- Right ascension: 12^{h} 47^{m} 45.5^{s}
- Declination: 13° 45′ 46″
- Redshift: 0.005390/1616 km/s
- Distance: 54,025,244 ly
- Group or cluster: Virgo Cluster
- Apparent magnitude (V): 11.6

Characteristics
- Type: SA(rs)bc, LINER
- Size: ~78,581.58 ly (estimated)
- Apparent size (V): 4.3 x 3.5

Other designations
- PGC 43186, UGC 7965, VCC 2058

NGC 4689 is a spiral galaxy located about 54 million light-years away in the constellation of Coma Berenices. NGC 4689 is also classified as a LINER galaxy. NGC 4689 is inclined at an angle of about 36° which means that the galaxy is seen almost face-on to the Earth's line of sight. NGC 4689 was discovered by astronomer William Herschel on April 12, 1784. The galaxy is a member of the Virgo Cluster.

== Physical characteristics ==
NGC 4689 has ring-like feature in its inner regions. Surrounding the inner ring lies a zone of bright, flocculent spiral structure with a ring-like boundary. Outside this zone is a well-defined, diffuse outer ring which is an unusual feature for a late-type galaxy like NGC 4689.

=== Star formation ===
The star forming disk in NGC 4689 has been truncated which means that the amount of star formation has been reduced significantly. This truncation may have been caused by an interaction with intracluster medium of the Virgo Cluster causing the galaxy to lose much of its interstellar medium in an effect known as ram-pressure stripping. Due to its reduced amount of star formation, NGC 4689 has been classified as an anemic galaxy.

== Gallery ==
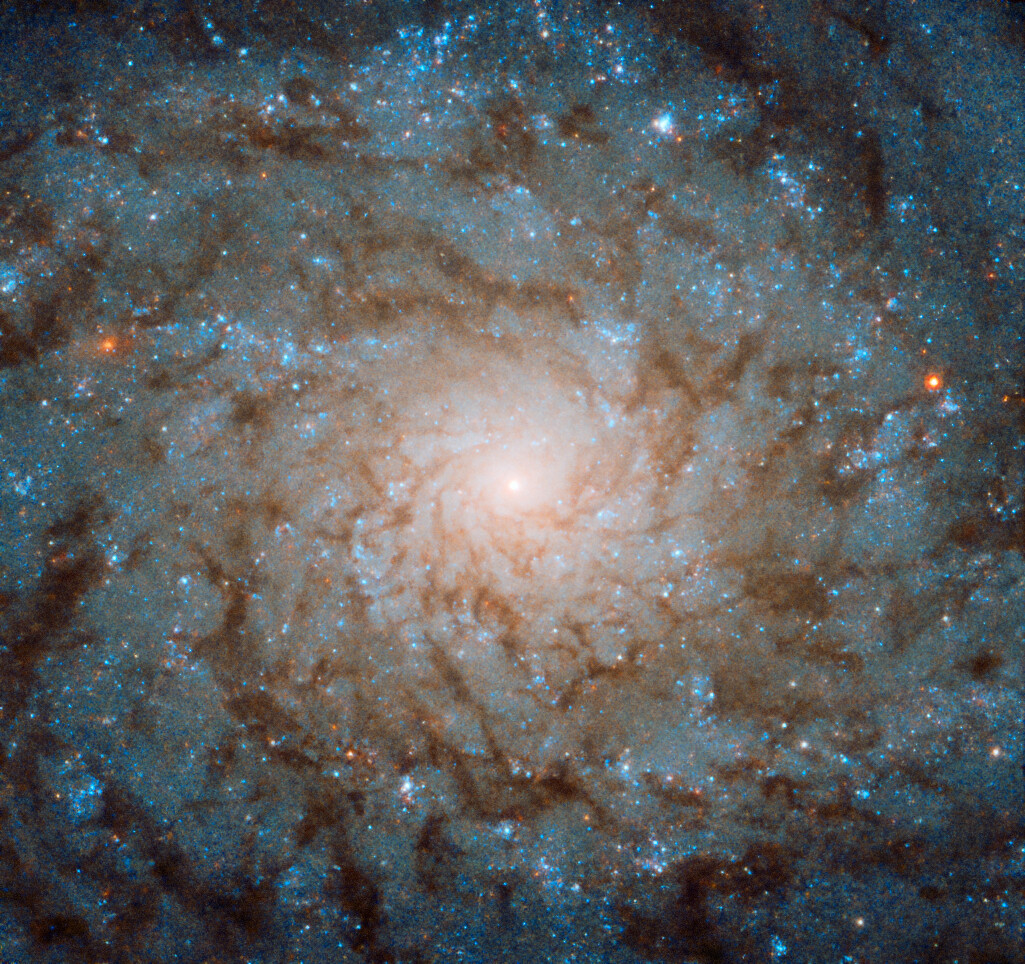
A Smudged Fingerprint.

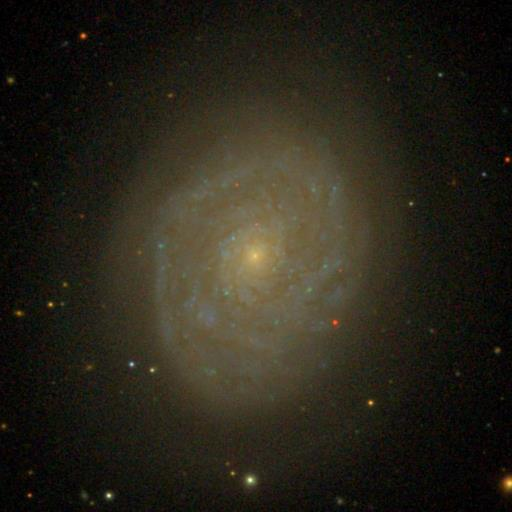
Sloan Digital Sky Survey image of NGC 4689.

== See also ==
- List of NGC objects (4001–5000)
- NGC 4921- an Anemic spiral galaxy in the Coma Cluster
- Messier 90 - another Anemic spiral galaxy in the Virgo Cluster
