= NGC 4522 =

Spiral galaxy in the constellation of Virgo

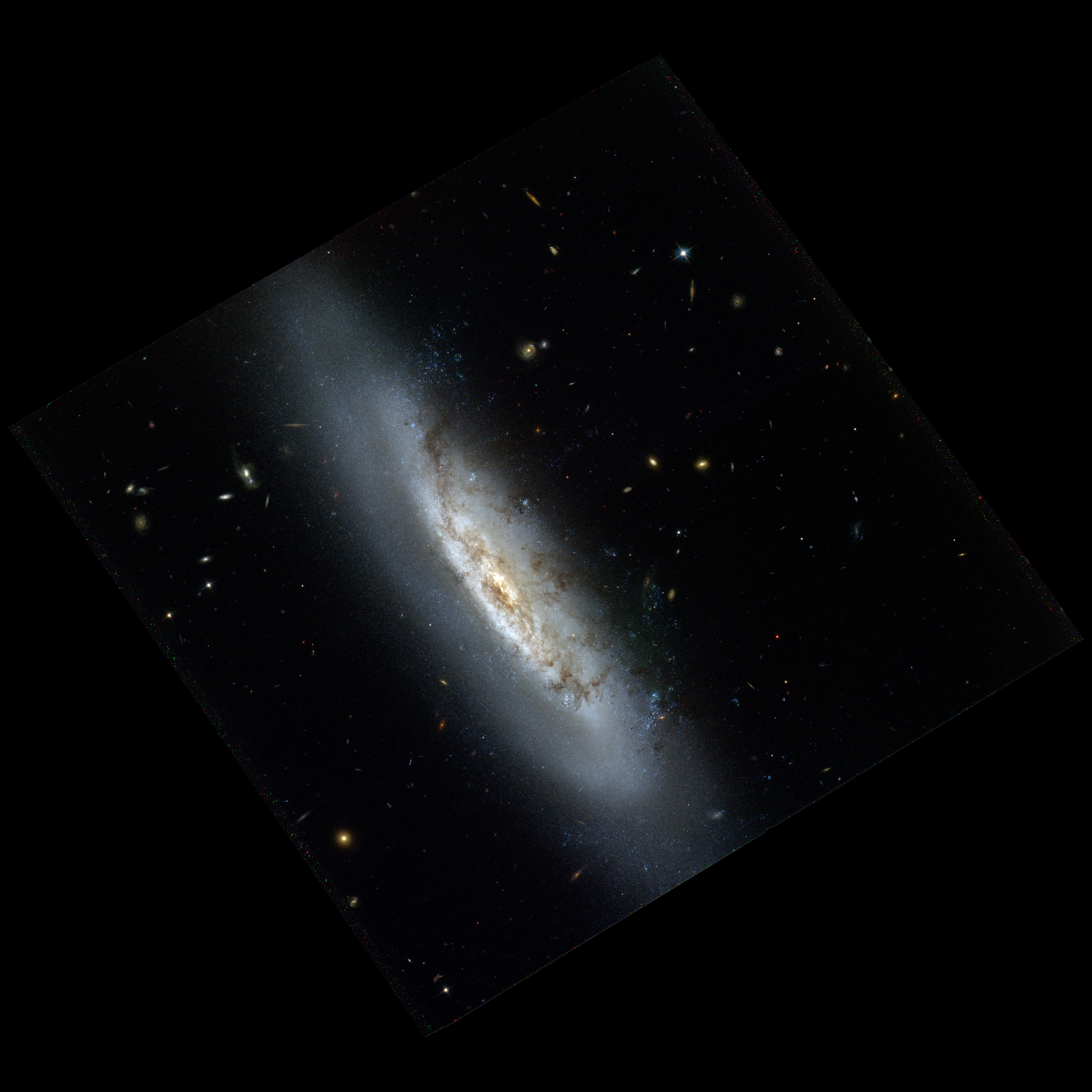
- Hubble Space Telescope image of NGC 4522.

Observation data (J2000 epoch)
- Constellation: Virgo
- Right ascension: 12^{h} 33^{m} 39.7^{s}
- Declination: 09° 10′ 30″
- Redshift: 0.007769
- Heliocentric radial velocity: 2329 km/s
- Distance: 56.4 Mly
- Group or cluster: Virgo Cluster
- Apparent magnitude (V): 13.0

Characteristics
- Type: SB(s)cd
- Size: ~68,850 ly (estimated)
- Apparent size (V): 3.95 x 0.84

Other designations
- CGCG 70-168, IRAS 12311+0926, MCG 2-32-137, PGC 41729, UGC 7711, VCC 1516

NGC 4522 is an edge-on spiral galaxy located about 60 million light-years away within the Virgo Cluster in the constellation Virgo. NGC 4522 is losing its molecular gas though ram-pressure stripping as it plows though the cluster at a speed of more than 10 million kilometres per hour. The galaxy was discovered by astronomer John Herschel on January 18, 1828.

== Ram-pressure stripping ==
The selectively disturbed interstellar medium (ISM) of NGC 4522, together with a normal-appearing stellar disk, strongly suggest that the galaxy is undergoing ram-pressure stripping caused by an interaction between the intracluster medium (ICM) of the surrounding Virgo Cluster with the ISM of the galaxy itself.

However at NGC 4522's projected distance from Messier 87 (~1 Mpc), and assumption of a static smooth ICM and other "standard values", the force of the ram-pressure stripping exerted at the galaxy's location appears to be an order of magnitude less than needed to cause the observed truncation of the galaxy's gas disk. Despite this, NGC 4522 may have recently passed through a region of enhanced ICM density. Possibly, the infall of the Messier 49 group into the Virgo Cluster has stirred up the ICM of the cluster, locally enhancing the ram pressure exerted on NGC 4522.

=== Progenitor of BC6 ===
It has been suggested that NGC 4522 may be the progenitor of the blue blob known as BC6 (embedded within a 600,000 light year long chain of intergalactic gas clouds, known as the "ALFALFA Virgo 7 cloud complex"), due to its similar metallicity to the blob, as well as the fact that the stripping is happening in the same direction as that of the blob. However, there are some other difficulties with this hypothesis, as it can't easily explain the kinematic separation between BC6 and NGC 4522.

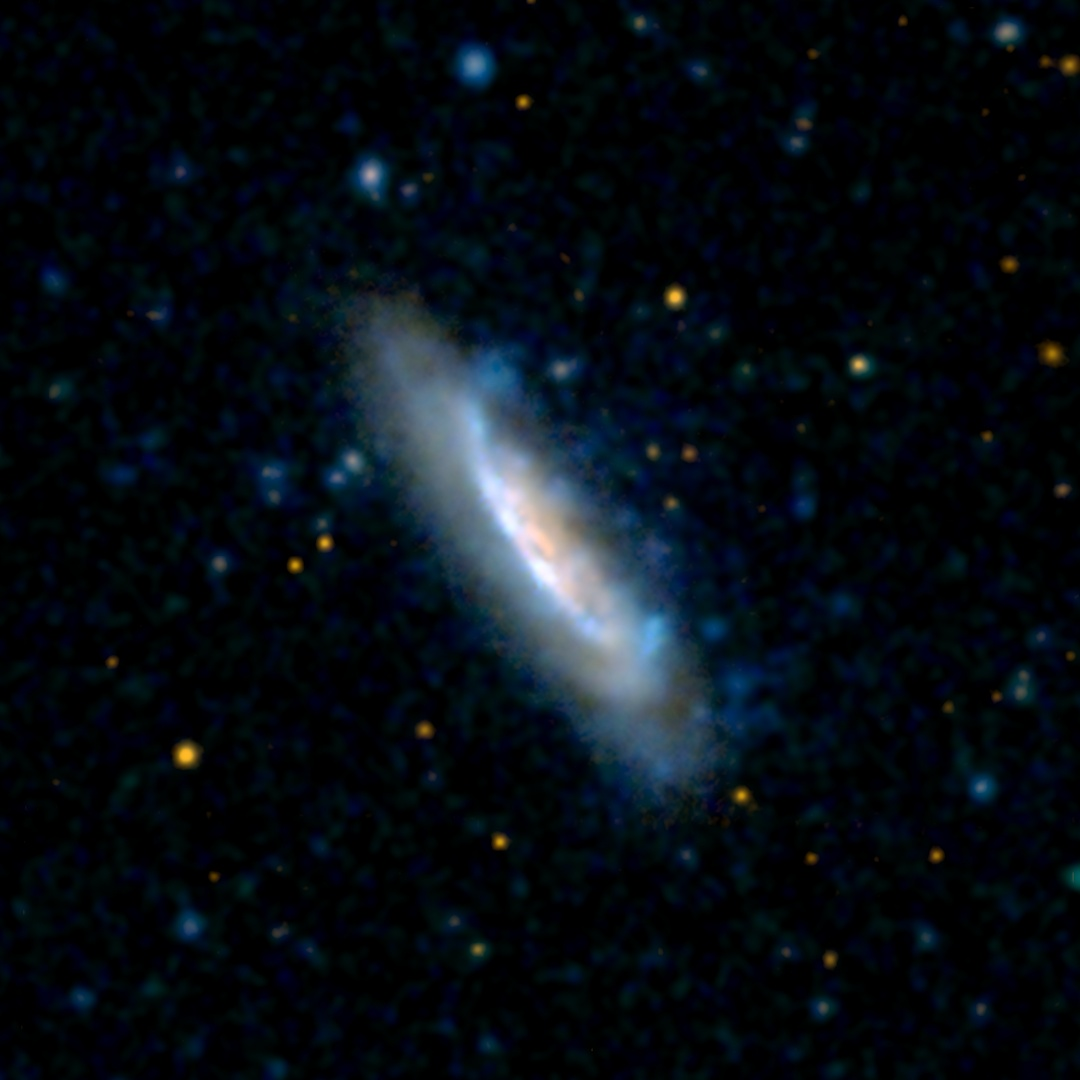
GALEX image of NGC 4522 showing the gas in the galaxy being stripped.

== Features ==
In NGC 4522, there are several features that have been suggested to be attributes of ram-pressure stripping.

The northeast region of NGC 4522, contains a large, continuous dust lane that curves out of the disk of the galaxy that is known as "The dust upturn”. The region also contains a wide lane of stars, including many young blue stars that has been named "The stellar upturn". At the top of the upturn, there are a couple of distinct HII regions.

The southwest region features a number of decoupled extraplanar dust clouds and an arm structure containing a number of HII regions and groupings of bright young blue stars.

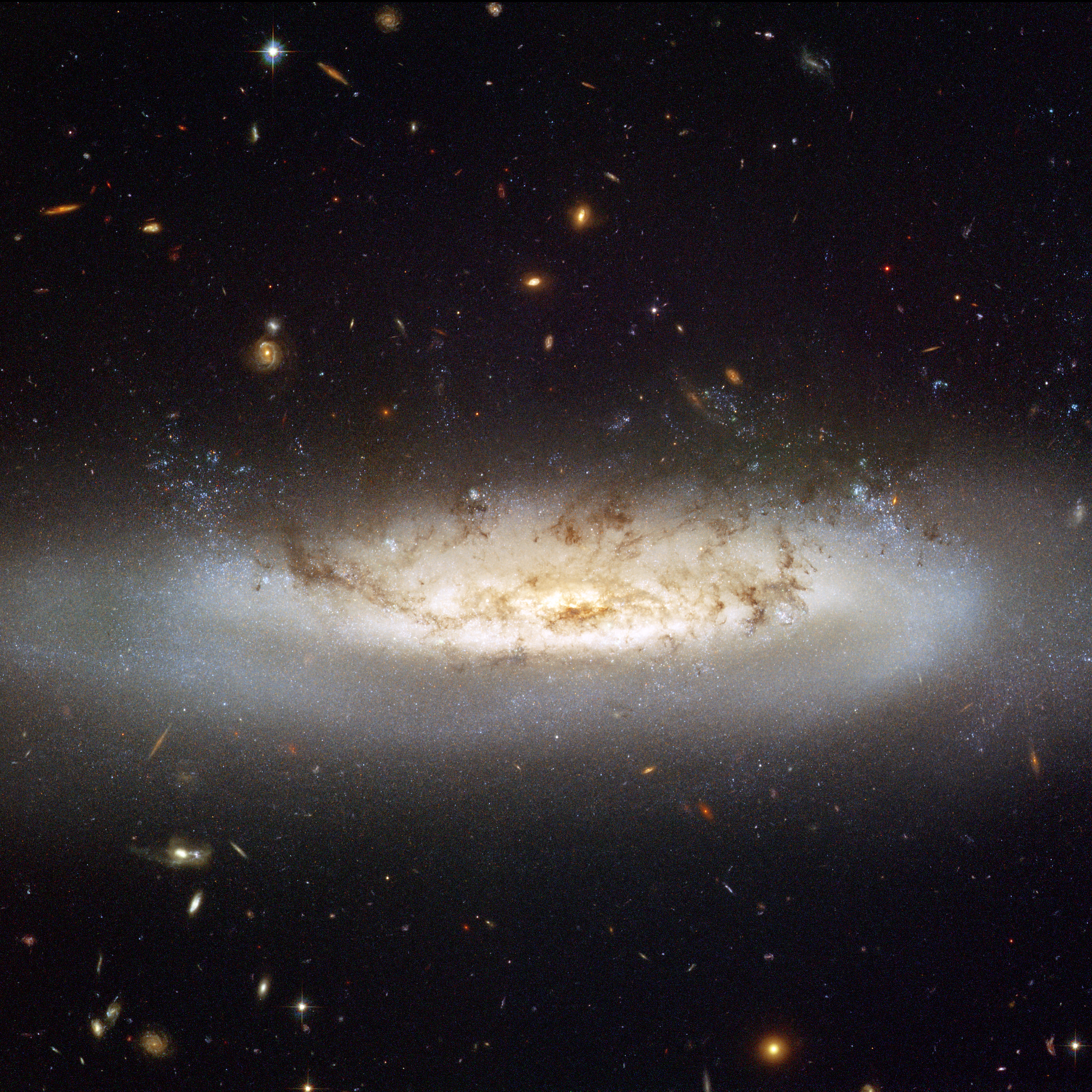
Hubble Space Telescope image of NGC 4522 showing a number of newly formed star clusters that formed in the stripped gas.

== Star formation ==
As a consequence of ram-pressure stripping, NGC 4522 has a shrunken star forming disk with an enhanced rate of star formation in the inner regions while there is lack of star formation in the outer disk.

Some of the newly formed stars in NGC 4522 are forming in H II regions in filaments of stripped gas rising from the star forming disk of the galaxy. These stars may enter the halo of NGC 4522 or escape into intergalactic space.

== See also ==
- List of NGC objects (4001–5000)
- NGC 4402
- ESO 137-001
