= NGC 4299 =

Galaxy in the constellation Virgo

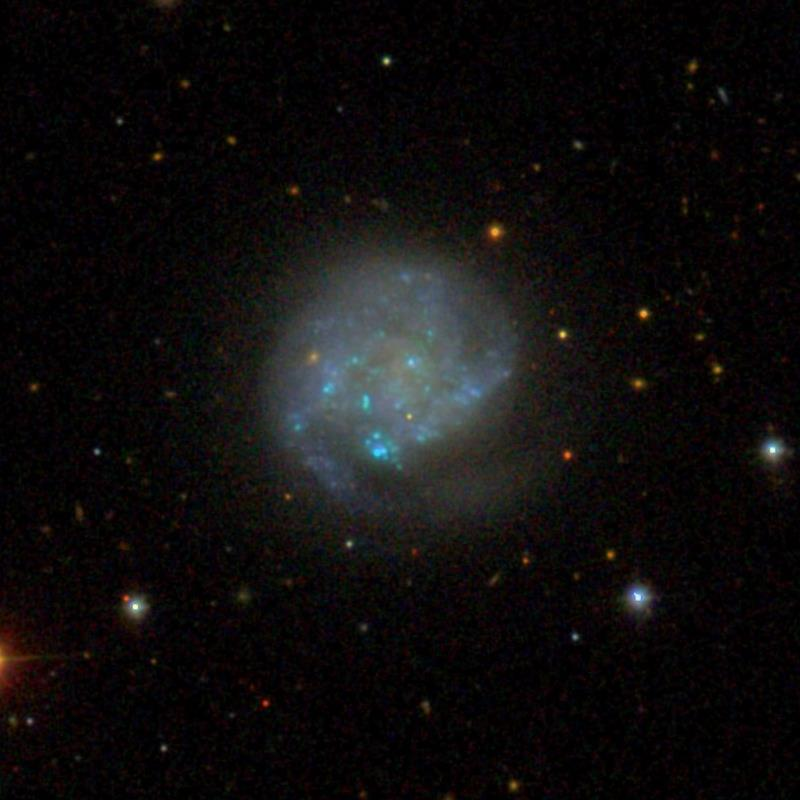
- Sloan Digital Sky Survey image of NGC 4299

Observation data (J2000 epoch)
- Constellation: Virgo
- Right ascension: 12^{h} 21^{m} 40.5^{s}
- Declination: 11° 30′ 00″
- Redshift: 0.000791
- Heliocentric radial velocity: 237 km/s
- Distance: 55 Mly (16.8 Mpc)
- Group or cluster: Virgo Cluster
- Apparent magnitude (V): 12.88

Characteristics
- Type: SAB(s)dm
- Size: ~36,000 ly (11 kpc) (estimated)
- Apparent size (V): 1.7 x 1.6

Other designations
- VCC 491, IRAS 12191+1146, UGC 7414, MCG +02-32-010, PGC 39968, CGCG 70-25

NGC 4299 is a featureless spiral galaxy located about 55 million light-years away in the constellation Virgo. It was discovered by astronomer William Herschel on March 15, 1784 and is a member of the Virgo Cluster.

NGC 4299 forms an interacting pair with NGC 4294.

== Physical characteristics ==
NGC 4299 has a fairly featureless disk with a very small, weak bulge and weak, asymmetric spiral arms plus numerous bright HII regions.

At the center of NGC 4299 lies a nuclear star cluster with a diameter of ~5.9 ly (1.8 pc).

=== Truncated Hα disk ===
NGC 4299 has a truncated Hα disk with the outer extent of the Hα having an irregular distribution except in the southwest where it forms a well-defined ridge. This appears to be the result of ram-pressure.

== Interaction with NGC 4294 ==
As a result of a tidal interaction with NGC 4294, NGC 4299 has a disturbed optical and HI morphology, with asymmetric spiral arms, a small, weak bar and a high global star formation rate that appears to have been enhanced by ram-pressure.

== HI tail ==
Chung et al. identified that NGC 4299 has a one sided tail of neutral atomic hydrogen (HI). The tail points to the southwest and appears to be a result of ram-pressure or by a tidal interaction with NGC 4294. The tail has no optical counterpart and is oriented parallel to the HI tail found in NGC 4294.

NGC 4299 appears to have a second tail pointing to the southeast that is much broader and lower in HI surface density than the main tail.

== Black Hole ==
NGC 4299 may harbor an intermediate-mass black hole with an estimated mass ranging from 7,000 (7*10^3) to 200,000 (2*10^5) solar masses.

== Gallery ==
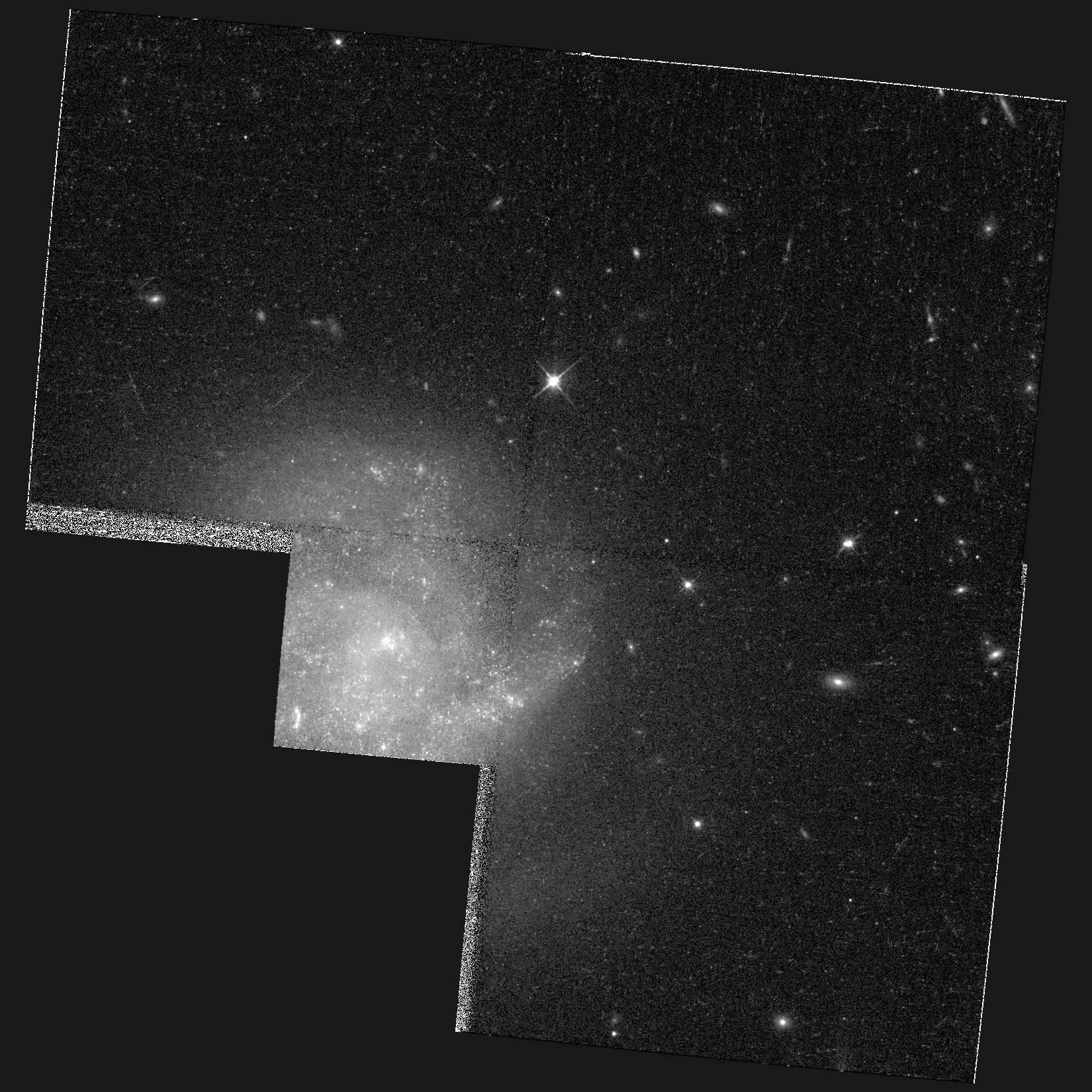
Hubble Space Telescope image of NGC 4299

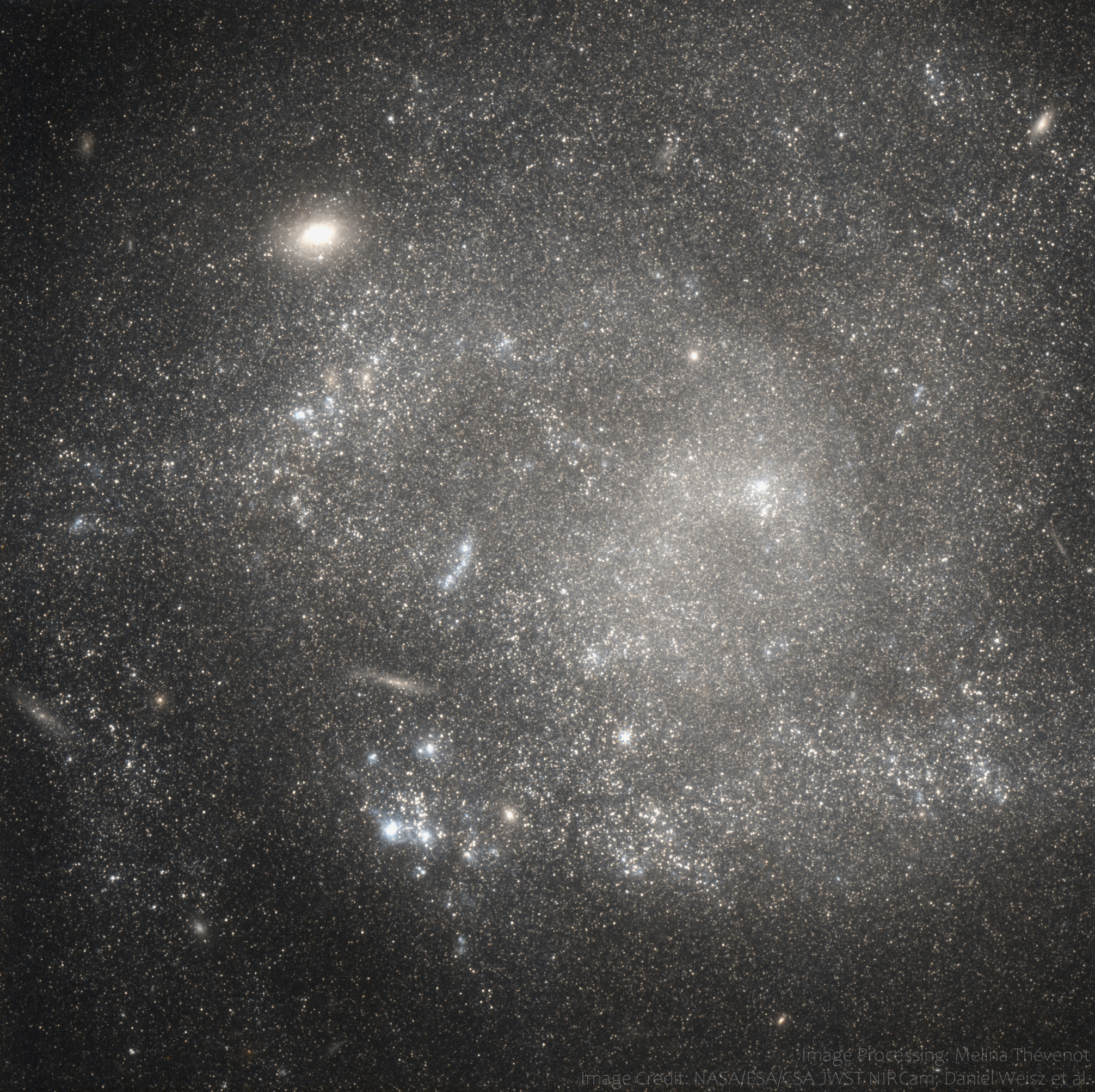
James Webb Space Telescope NIRCam image of NGC 4299

== See also ==
- List of NGC objects (4001–5000)
