= NGC 741 =

Formerly active radio galaxy in the constellation of Pisces

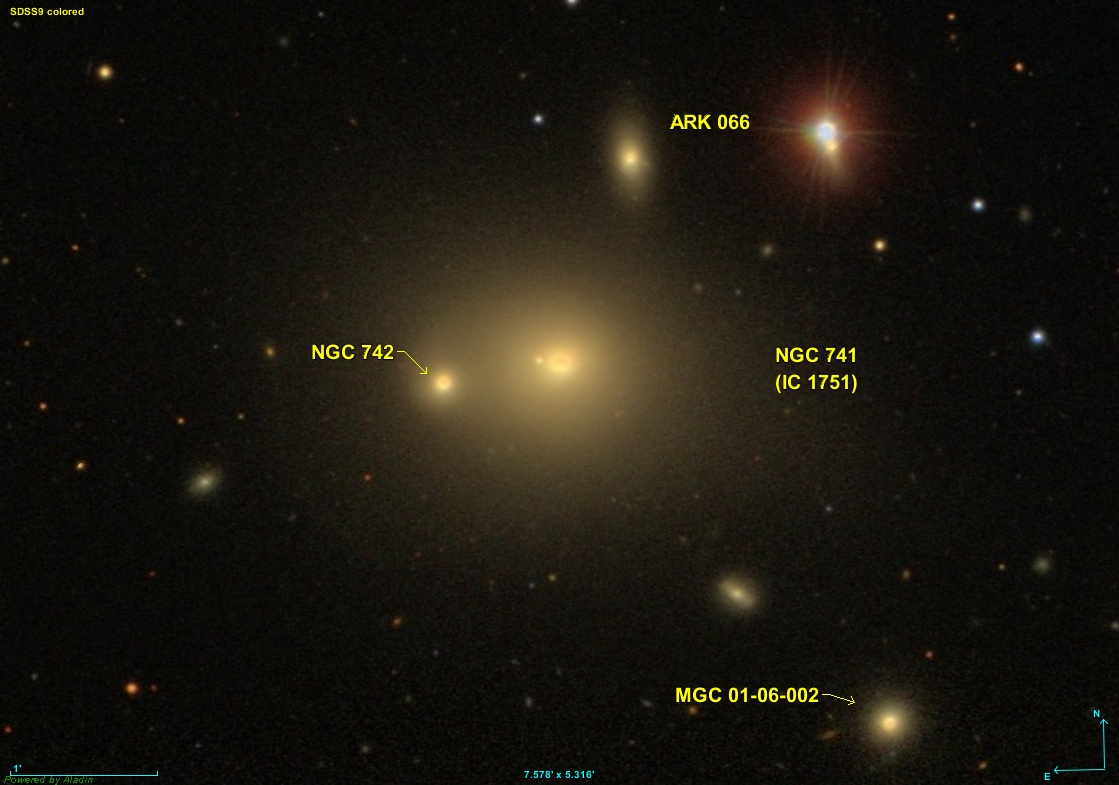
- SDSS image of NGC 741

Observation data (J2000 epoch)
- Constellation: Pisces
- Right ascension: 01^{h} 56^{m} 20.959^{s}
- Declination: +05° 37′ 43.77″
- Redshift: 0.01856
- Heliocentric radial velocity: 5513 km/s
- Distance: 241.8 Mly (74.13 Mpc)
- Group or cluster: NGC 741 group
- Apparent magnitude (V): 11.26
- Apparent magnitude (B): 12.31

Characteristics
- Type: E0:

Other designations
- UGC 1413, MCG +01-06-003, PGC 7252

NGC 741, also known as PGC 7252, is a formerly active radio galaxy in the constellation of Pisces. Located 74.13 Mpc away, NGC 741 is part of a group of galaxies including NGC 742 and PGC 7250. NGC 741 and NGC 742 recently collided, although the disruption was minor. Radio filaments have been found connecting NGC 741 to NGC 742, and due to the bent structure of the radio filaments, NGC 741 is estimated to be moving at 1400 km/s with respect to its local group, suggesting that ram-pressure stripping was created as a product of the former merger.
