= NGC 4907 =

Barred spiral galaxy in the constellation Coma Berenices

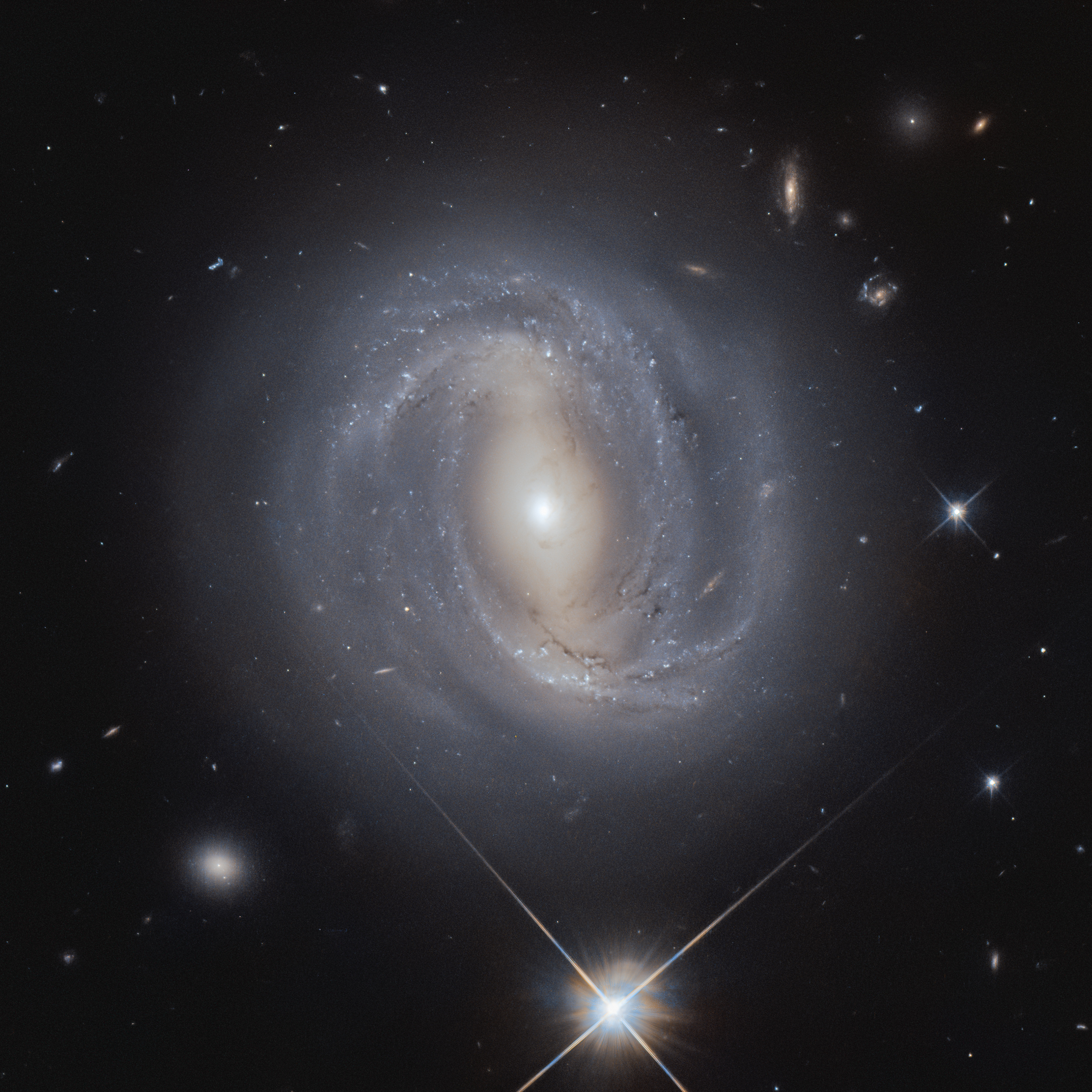
- Hubble Space Telescope image of NGC 4907

Observation data (J2000 epoch)
- Constellation: Coma Berenices
- Right ascension: 13^{h} 00^{m} 48.8^{s}
- Declination: 28° 09′ 30″
- Redshift: 0.019610/5879 km/s
- Distance: 273,200,000 ly
- Group or cluster: Coma Cluster
- Apparent magnitude (V): 14.1

Characteristics
- Type: SB(r)b, LINER
- Size: ~98,000 ly (30 kpc) (estimated)
- Apparent size (V): 1.1 x 1.0

Other designations
- CGCG 160-257, DRCG 27-205, MCG 5-31-89, PGC 44819

NGC 4907 is a barred spiral galaxy located about 270 million light-years away in the constellation of Coma Berenices. It is also classified as a LINER galaxy. NGC 4907 was discovered by astronomer Heinrich d'Arrest on May 5, 1864. The galaxy is a member of the Coma Cluster, located equidistant between NGC 4928 and NGC 4829.

== See also ==
- List of NGC objects (4001–5000)
- NGC 4921 another barred spiral galaxy in the Coma Cluster

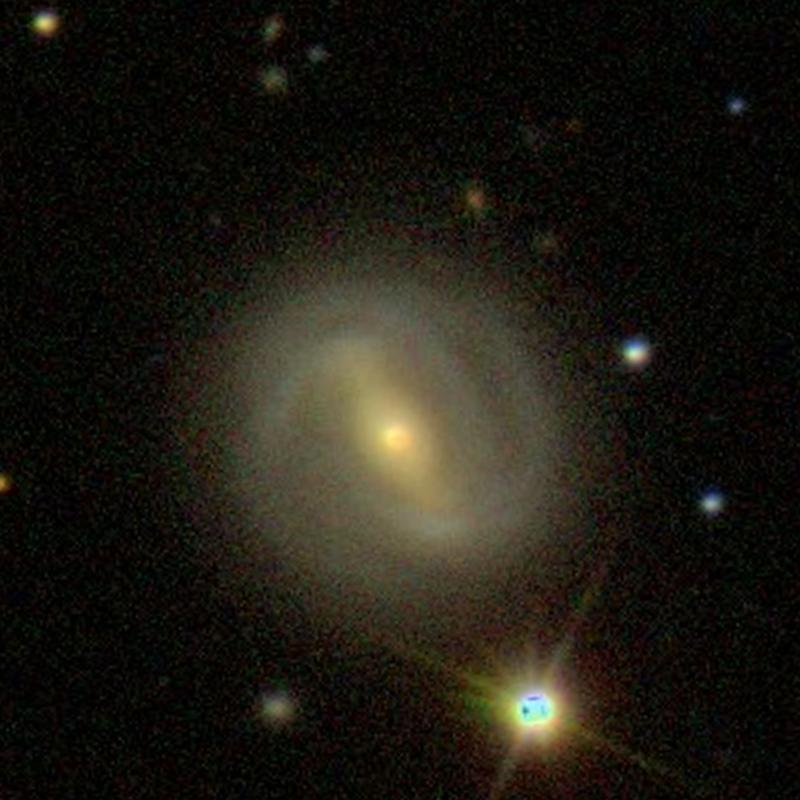
SDSS image of NGC 4907.
