= NGC 4294 =

Galaxy in the constellation Virgo

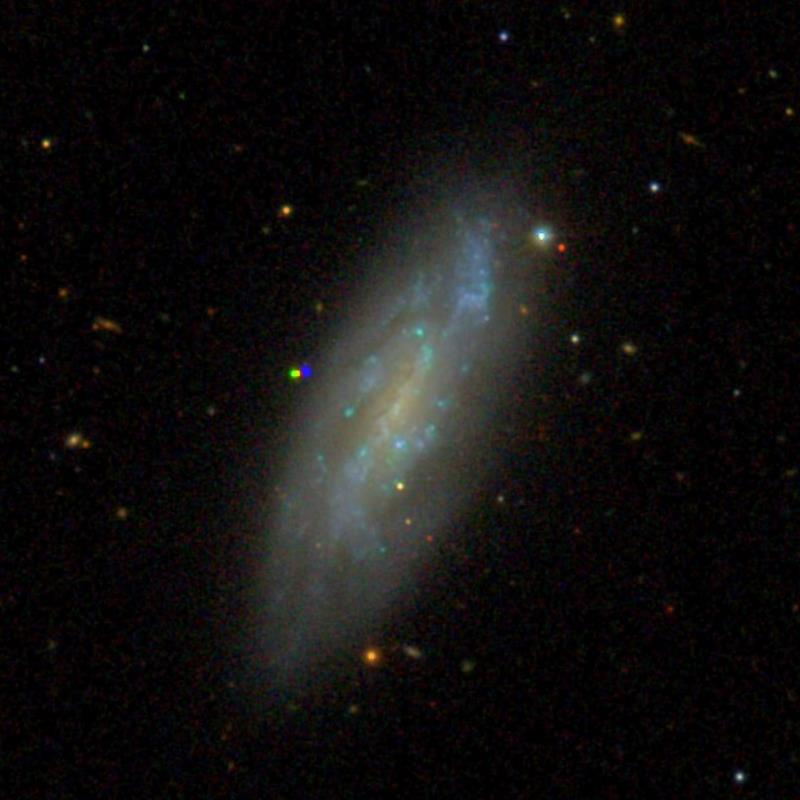
- SDSS image of NGC 4294

Observation data (J2000 epoch)
- Constellation: Virgo
- Right ascension: 12^{h} 21^{m} 17.8^{s}
- Declination: 11° 30′ 38″
- Redshift: 0.001184
- Heliocentric radial velocity: 355 km/s
- Distance: 55 Mly (17 Mpc)
- Group or cluster: Virgo Cluster
- Apparent magnitude (V): 12.5

Characteristics
- Type: SB(s)cd
- Size: ~52,000 ly (16 kpc) (estimated)
- Apparent size (V): 3.2 x 1.2

Other designations
- KCPG 330B, VCC 465, IRAS 12187+1147, UGC 7407, MCG +02-32-009, PGC 39925, CGCG 70-24, SDSS J122117.82+113037.6

NGC 4294 is a barred spiral galaxy with flocculent spiral arms located about 55 million light-years away in the constellation Virgo. The galaxy was discovered by astronomer William Herschel on March 15, 1784 and is a member of the Virgo Cluster.

NGC 4294 appears to be undergoing ram-pressure stripping edge-on.

== Physical characteristics ==
NGC 4294 hosts many H II regions.

== Interaction with NGC 4299 ==
NGC 4294 appears to be in a pair with NGC 4299 and may be possibly tidally interacting.

Effects of a tidal interaction on NGC 4294 are evident as the galaxy has a disturbed optical and HI morphology, a high global star formation rate, and has an observed asymmetry in polarized radio continuum emission.

== HI tail ==
Chung et al. identified that NGC 4294 has a one sided 88,000 ly (27 kpc) tail of neutral atomic hydrogen (HI). The tail points to the southwest and appears to be a result of ram-pressure. The tail has no optical counterpart and is oriented parallel to the HI tail found in NGC 4299.

As the tail has no optical counterpart, this makes the probability of the tail being caused by tidal interaction low. However, NGC 4299 lies 88,000 ly (27 kpc) from NGC 4294 and the two galaxies have almost the same velocity, with a difference of 120 km/s. This means that the scenario of the tail originating from a tidal interaction cannot be ruled out entirely.

== Black Hole ==
NGC 4294 may harbor an intermediate-mass black hole with an estimated mass ranging from 3,000 (3*10^3) to 20,000 (2*10^4) solar masses.

== See also ==
-UGC 8153, has a similar-mass central black hole.
