= NGC 7726 =

Barred spiral galaxy in the constellation Pegasus

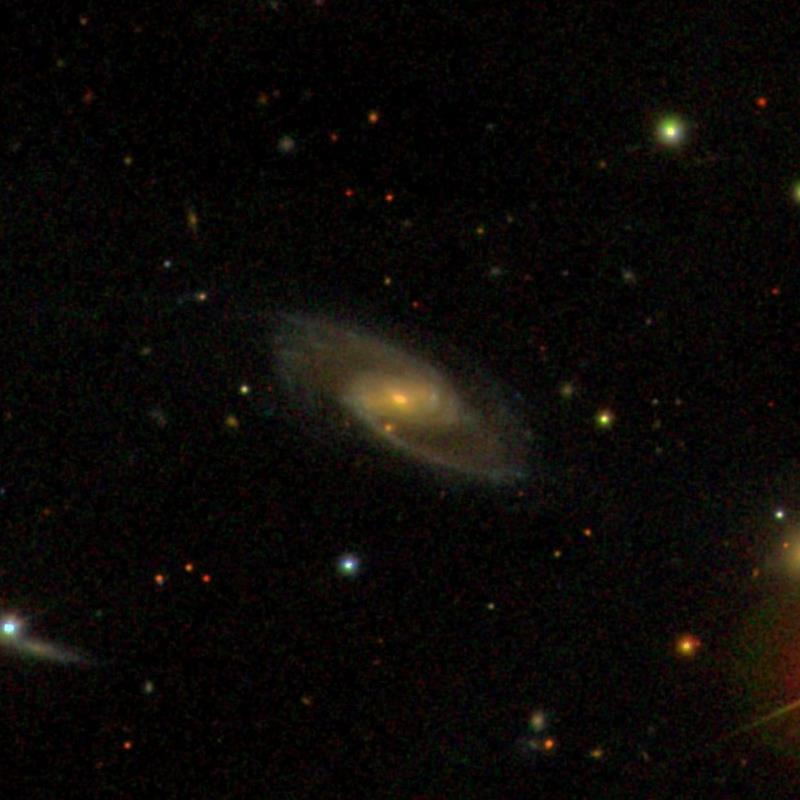
- NGC 7726, as photographed during the Sloan Digital Sky Survey

Observation data (J2000 epoch)
- Constellation: Pegasus
- Right ascension: 23^{h} 40^{m} 25^{s}
- Declination: +27° 15′ 05″
- Apparent magnitude (B): 15
- Surface brightness: 23.83 mag/arcsec^2

Characteristics
- Type: SB(s)b

Other designations
- UGC 12721, MCG 04-55-040, PGC 72024

NGC 7726 is a large barred spiral galaxy located in the constellation Pegasus in the northern sky. It is estimated to be 348 million light-years from the Milky Way and about 150,000 light-years in diameter. Many other objects are located within a close proximity to NGC 7726, including NGC 7720, NGC 7728, IC 5341 and IC 5342.

The object was discovered by astronomer Lewis Swift on August 8, 1886.

== See also ==
- List of NGC objects (7001–7840)
