= Messier 90 =

Galaxy in the constellation Virgo

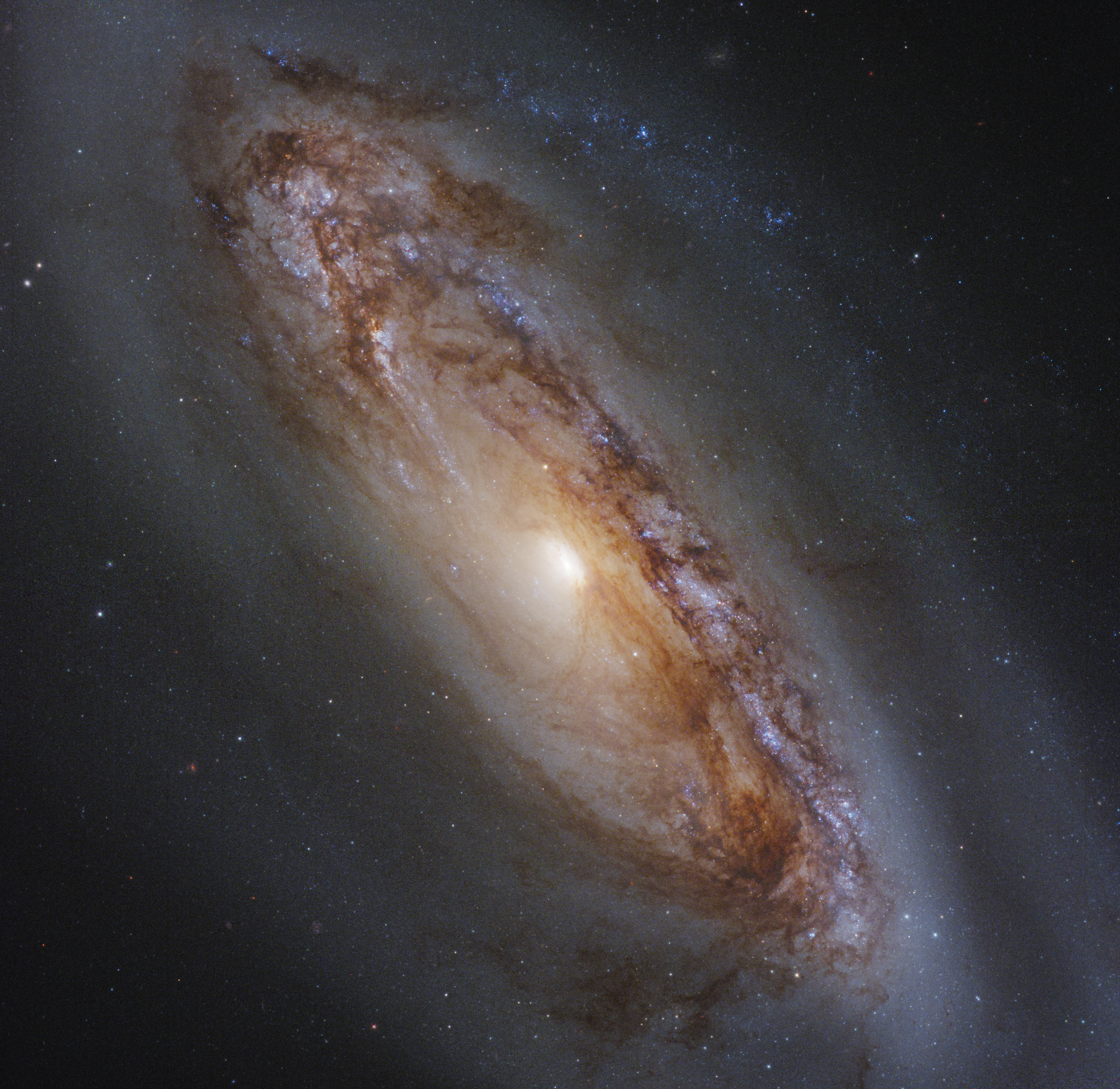
- Messier 90 imaged by the Hubble Space Telescope

Observation data (J2000 epoch)
- Constellation: Virgo
- Right ascension: 12^{h} 36^{m} 49.8^{s}
- Declination: +13° 09′ 46″
- Redshift: −0.000784±0.000013
- Heliocentric radial velocity: −235±4 km/s
- Galactocentric velocity: −282±4 km/s
- Distance: 58.7 ± 2.8 Mly (18.00 ± 0.86 Mpc)
- Apparent magnitude (V): 9.5

Characteristics
- Type: SAB(rs)ab, LINER, Sy
- Size: 132,200 ly (40.55 kpc) (estimated)
- Apparent size (V): 9.5 × 4.4 moa

Other designations
- NGC 4569, UGC 7786, PGC 42089, Arp 76
- References: SIMBAD: Search M90

Messier 90 (also known as M90, NGC 4569 or as the Carabin Galaxy) is an intermediate spiral galaxy exhibiting a weak inner ring structure about 60 million light-years away^{[a]} in the constellation Virgo. It was discovered by Charles Messier in 1781.

== Membership of the Virgo Cluster ==
Messier 90 is a member of the Virgo Cluster, being one of its largest and brightest spiral galaxies, with an absolute magnitude of around −22 (brighter than the Andromeda Galaxy). The galaxy is found about 1.5° from the central subgroup of Messier 87. Due to the galaxy's interaction with the intracluster medium in its cluster, the galaxy has lost much of its interstellar medium. As a result of this process, which is referred to as ram-pressure stripping, the medium and star formation regions appear severely truncated compared to similar galaxies outside the Virgo Cluster and there are even H II regions outside the galactic plane, as well as long (up to 80,000-parsec—that is, 260,000-light-year) tails of ionized gas that have been stripped away.

== Star formation activity ==
As stated above, the star formation in Messier 90 appears truncated. Consequently, the galaxy's spiral arms appear to be smooth and featureless, rather than knotted like galaxies with extended star formation, which justifies why this galaxy, along with NGC 4921 in the Coma Cluster has been classified as the prototype of an anemic galaxy. Some authors go even further and consider it is a passive spiral galaxy, similar to those found on galaxy clusters with high redshift.

However, its center appears to host significant nebula and star formation, where around 50,000 stars of spectral types O and B that formed around 5 to 6 million years ago are set amidst many A-type supergiants that were born in earlier starbursts, between 15 and 30 million years ago.

Multiple supernovae (up to 100,000) in the nucleus have produced 'superwinds' that are blowing the galaxy's interstellar medium outward into the intracluster medium collimated in two jets, one of which is being disturbed by interaction with Virgo's intracluster medium as the galaxy moves through it.

== Blueshift ==
The spectrum of Messier 90 is blueshifted, which indicates that, net of non-aligned vectors of motion, the gap between it and our galaxy is narrowing. The spectra of most galaxies are redshifted. The blueshift was originally used to argue that Messier 90 was actually an object in the foreground of the Virgo Cluster. However, since the phenomenon was limited mostly to galaxies in the same part of the sky as the Virgo Cluster, it appeared that this inference based on the blueshift was incorrect. Instead, many blueshifts exhibit the large range in velocities of objects within the Virgo Cluster.

== Distance measurements ==
Low levels of H I gas prevents using the Tully–Fisher relation to estimate the distance to Messier 90.

== Companion galaxies ==
Messier 90 is rich in globular clusters, with around 1,000 of them. The galaxy IC 3583 was once thought to be a satellite of Messier 90; however, it is now thought they are too far away to be interacting at all.

== Gallery ==
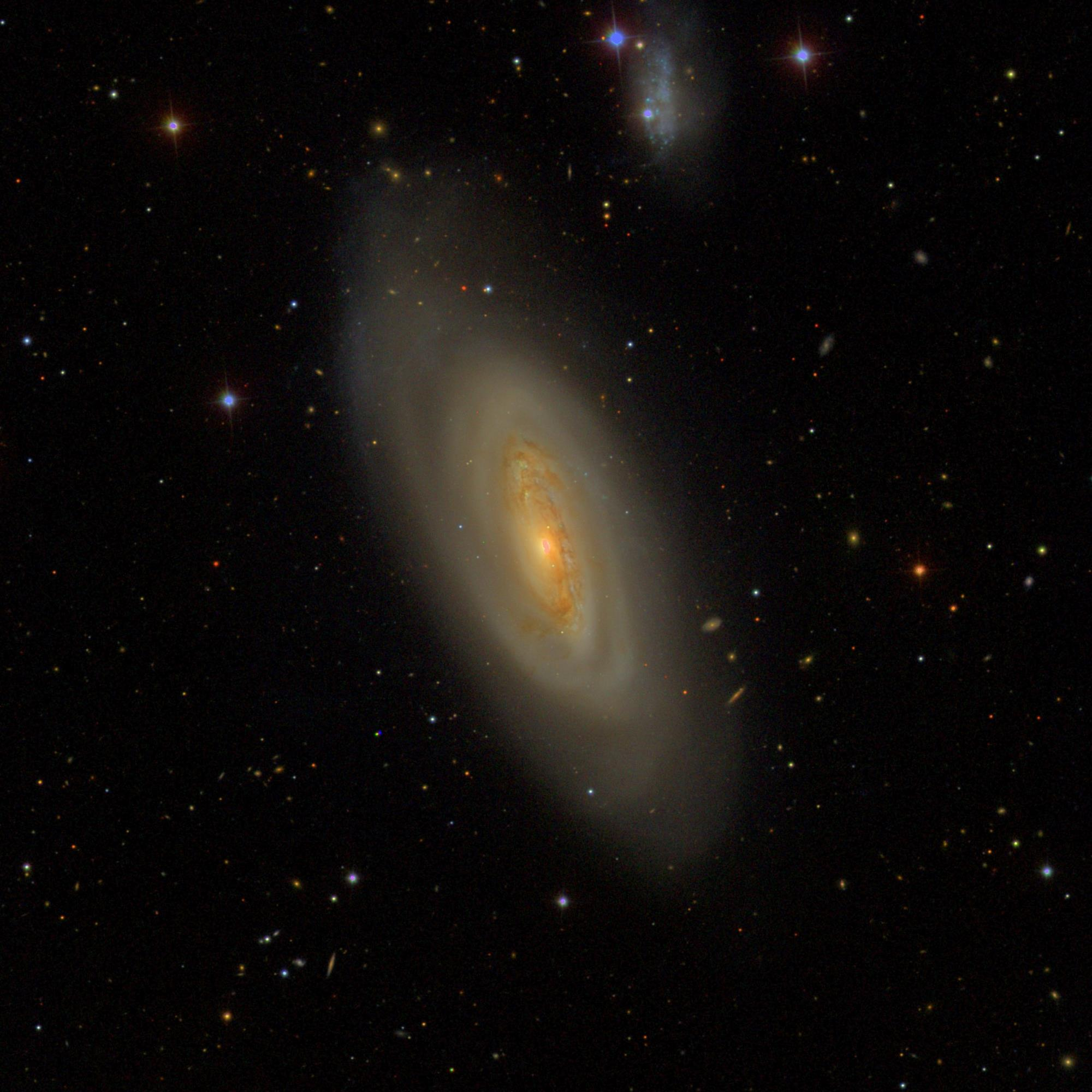
Messier 90 imaged by the Sloan Digital Sky Survey

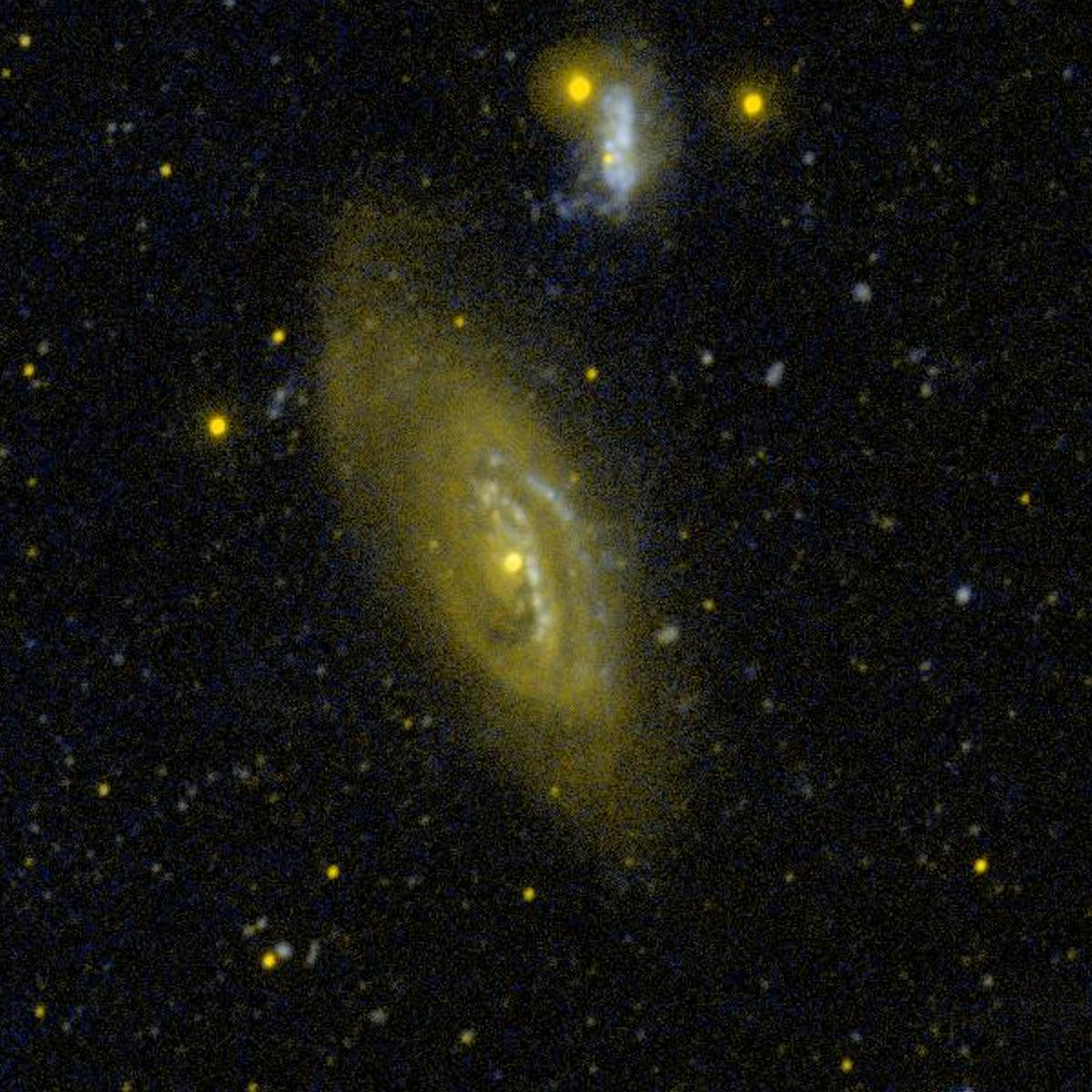
Messier 90 imaged by GALEX

== See also ==
- List of Messier objects
- Black Eye Galaxy (Messier 64), a similar spiral galaxy

== Notes ==
1. Tschöke et al. 2001 uses a Hubble constant of 75 (km/s)/Mpc to estimate a distance of 16.8 Mpc to NGC 4569. Adjusting for the 2006 value of 70^{+2.4}_{−3.2} (km/s)/Mpc we get a distance of 18.0^{+0.9}_{−0.6} Mpc.
