= IC 3583 =

Irregular galaxy in the constellation of Virgo

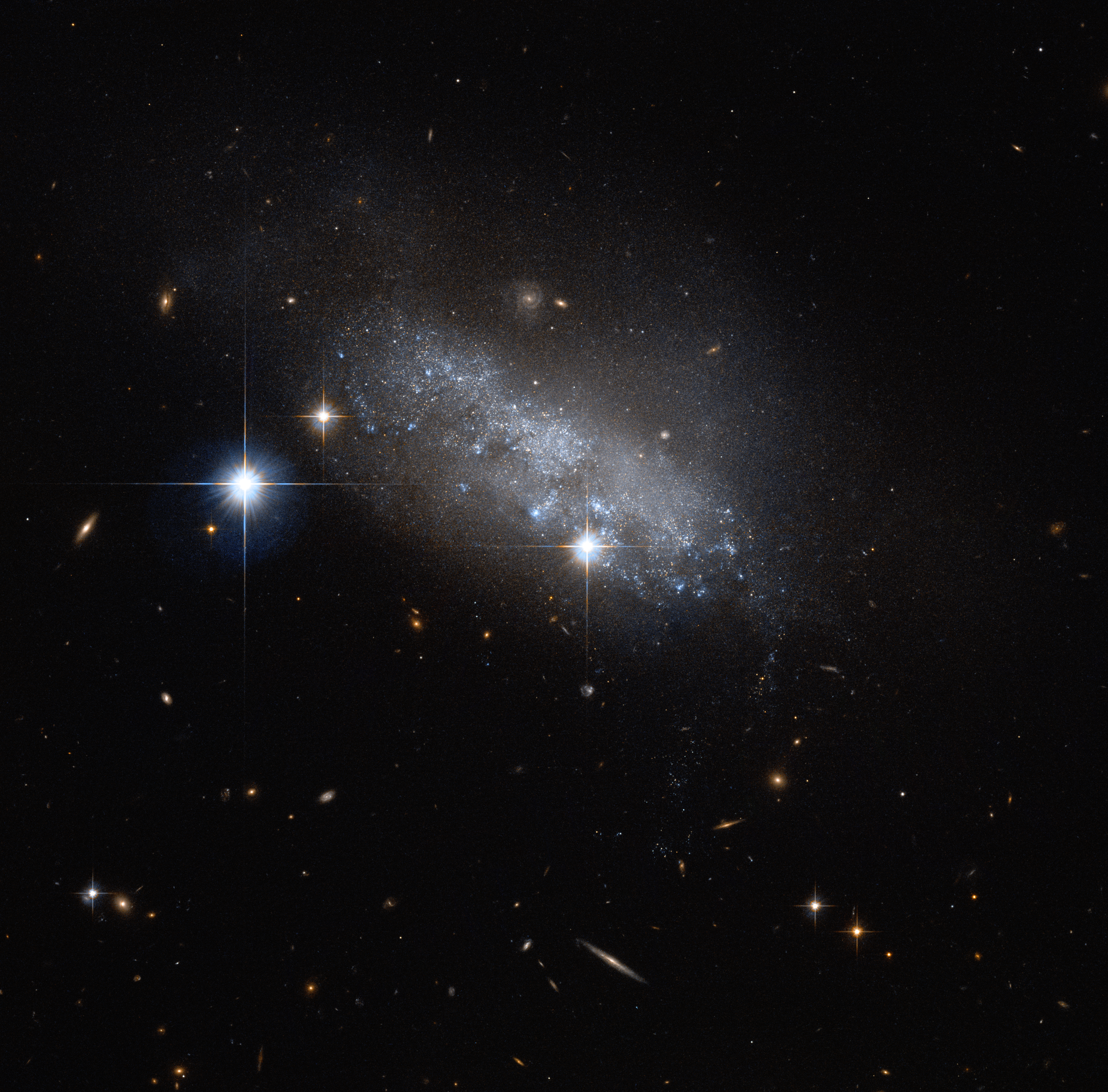
- Hubble Space Telescope image of IC 3583

Observation data (J2000 epoch)
- Constellation: Virgo
- Right ascension: 12^{h} 36.4^{m}
- Declination: −13° 15′
- Distance: 9.1 megaparsecs (30 Mly)
- Apparent magnitude (V): 13.3

Characteristics
- Type: Irr
- Apparent size (V): 2.2′ × 1.1′
- Notable features: Forms a pair with Messier 90

Other designations
- Arp 76, IRAS 12341+1332, MCG 2-32-154, PGC 42081, UGC 7784

IC 3583 is an irregular galaxy some 30 million light-years away in the constellation of Virgo. It was discovered by Isaac Roberts on April 29, 1892.

It may seem to have no discernable structure, but IC 3583 has been found to have a bar of stars running through its centre. These structures are common throughout the Universe, and are found within the majority of spiral, many irregular, and some lenticular galaxies. Two of our closest cosmic neighbours, the Large and Small Magellanic Clouds, are barred, indicating that they may have once been barred spiral galaxies that were disrupted or torn apart by the gravitational pull of the Milky Way.

Something similar might be happening with IC 3583. This small galaxy is thought to be gravitationally interacting with one of its neighbours, the spiral Messier 90. Together, the duo form a pairing known as Arp 76. It is still unclear whether these flirtations are the cause of IC 3583's irregular appearance.
