= UGC 8153 =

Small spiral galaxy, containing one of the smallest central black holes

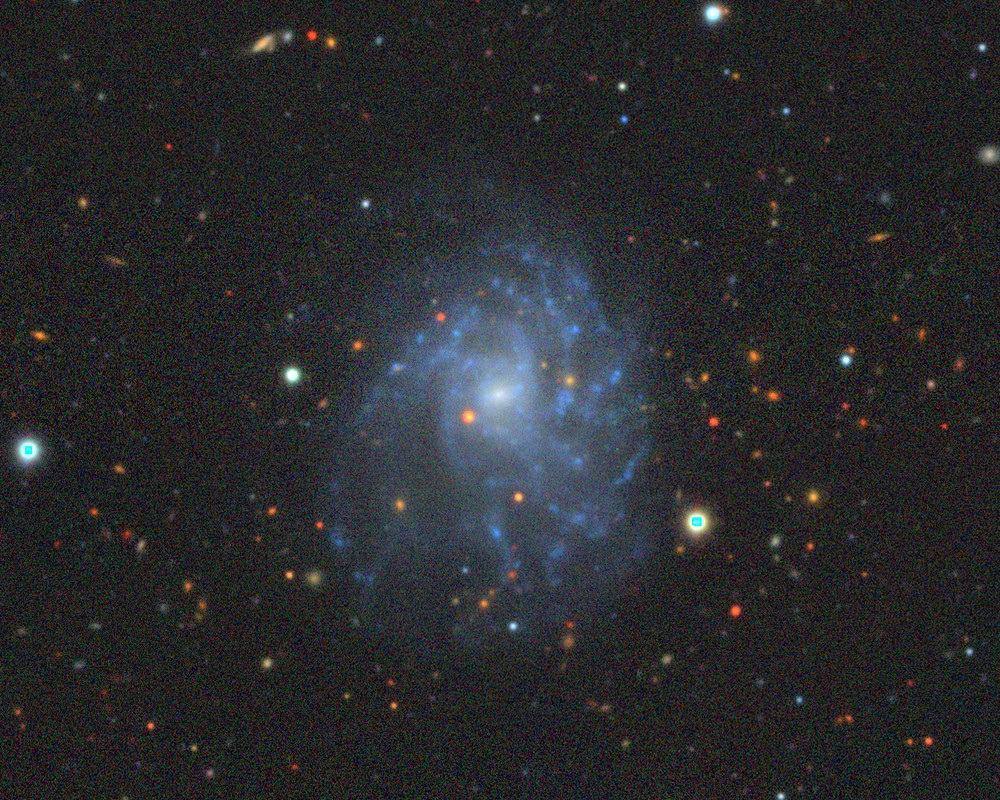
- UGC 8153 imaged by Legacy Surveys

Observation data (J2000 epoch)
- Constellation: Virgo
- Right ascension: 13^{h} 03^{m} 05.91^{s}
- Declination: +03° 59' 30.81"
- Redshift: 0.009593
- Heliocentric radial velocity: 2862
- Distance: 153.23 mly (46.98 mpc)
- Group or cluster: Virgo Cluster
- Apparent magnitude (B): 15.2

Characteristics
- Type: Sd
- Mass: 6.309 billion M_{☉}
- Size: 72,200 ly (22,150 parsecs)

Other designations
- Z 43-114, LEDA 45071, HIPASS J1303+03, CGCG 043-114

UGC 8153 also referred to as Z 43-114, is a spiral galaxy of morphological type of Sd and is located in the constellation of Virgo. The galaxy is approximately 153 million light years (47 megaparsecs) away from Earth and has an apparent B magnitude of 15.2. The first known reference to this galaxy comes from Volume I of the Catalogue of Galaxies and of Clusters of Galaxies compiled by Fritz Zwicky in 1961, where it was listed as CGCG 043-114, and described as "diffuse".

UGC 8153 is a small spiral galaxy in the Virgo Cluster. It is 72,200 light years (22,150 parsecs) across based on a distance of 153 million light years (46.98 megaparsecs) and an angular diameter of 108 arcsecs. It is believed to be a very low mass galaxy with an estimated stellar mass of 10^9.8 or roughly 6 billion M_{☉}.

In the galactic center of UGC 8153 potentially has an active galactic nucleus (AGN). It is centered on a lighter intermediate-mass black hole which is predicted to have a mass of 10^4.1 or ~12,500 M_{☉}, making it one of the least massive central black holes discovered.

== See also ==
- Virgo Cluster, the galaxy cluster UGC 8153 is located in.
- NGC 4294, another galaxy centered on a similar mass black hole.
