= SECCO 1 =

Stellar system in the Virgo Cluster

SECCO 1 is a star-forming stellar system in the Virgo Cluster. It became the first discovered blue blob in 2016. It hosts a number of H II regions.
