= NGC 7720 =

Galaxy in the constellation Pegasus

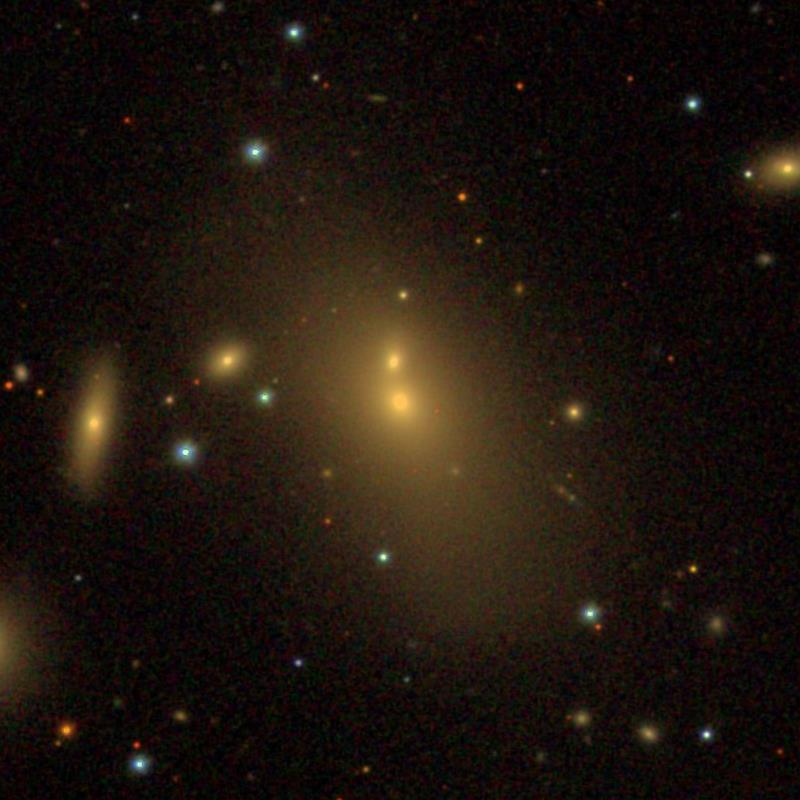
- SDSS image of NGC 7720

Observation data (J2000 epoch)
- Constellation: Pegasus
- Right ascension: 23^{h} 38^{m} 29.4^{s}
- Declination: +27° 01′ 53″
- Redshift: 0.030221 ± 0.000047
- Heliocentric radial velocity: 9,060 ± 14 km/s
- Distance: 385 ± 63 Mly (118 ± 19.3 Mpc)
- Apparent magnitude (V): 12.6

Characteristics
- Type: cD;E+ pec
- Apparent size (V): 1.6′ × 1.3′
- Notable features: Radio galaxy

Other designations
- UGC 12716, CGCG 476-091, MCG +04-55-036, 3C 465, 4C +26.64, PGC 71985

NGC 7720 is an elliptical galaxy located in the constellation Pegasus. It is located at a distance of about 380 million light years from Earth, which, given its apparent dimensions, means that NGC 7720 is about 180,000 light years across. NGC 7720 is the main galaxy of Abell 2634 galaxy cluster and is a radio galaxy. It was discovered by William Herschel on September 10, 1784.

== Characteristics ==
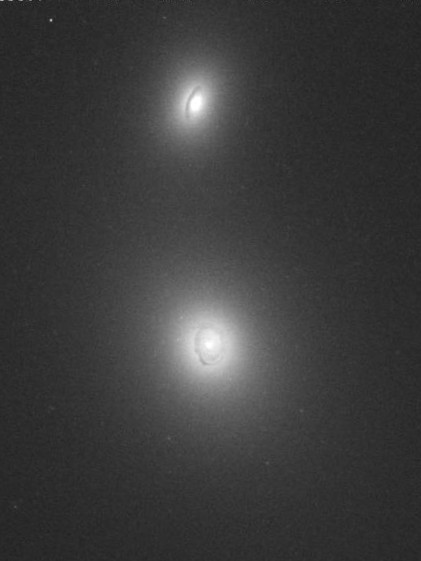
The central region of NGC 7720, with the two dust disks, by the Hubble Space Telescope.

NGC 7720 is made of a galaxy pair that is separated by 12 arcseconds. The south galaxy is the one associated with the radio source. In the centre of the galaxy lies a dust disk is visible nearly face on. The dust mass of NGC 7720 is estimated to be between 10^{6} to 10^{7} M_{☉}. There is also ionized Hα+[N II] gas emission from the disk. NGC 7720A features too a dusty disk.

=== Radio jet ===
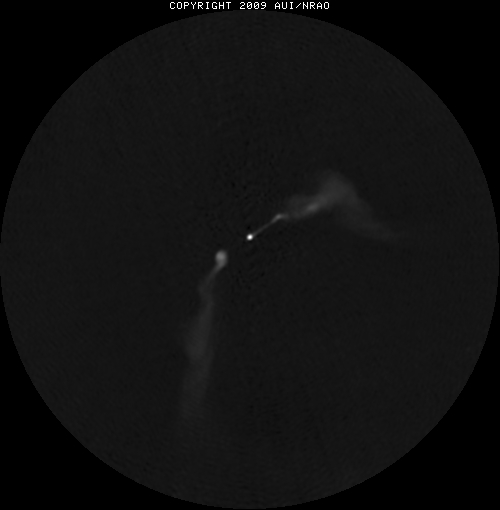
The radio jets of NGC 7720 by the Very Large Array.

NGC 7720 is a Fanaroff-Riley type I radio galaxy, and is also categorised as a wide angle tail (WAT) radio galaxy. It has two asymmetrical radio jets that emerge from the bright radio core. The core didn't exhibit variability when observed by the Very Large Array (VLA). In parsec scales, the jet is one sided features relativistic motion, about 0.6 times the speed of light, and has a northwest direction.

The northwest jet is the main one and forms a distorted plume about 5 arcminutes long, with a hotspot about 30 arcseconds from the core. The southeastern jet has a bright spot about 30 arcseconds from the core and then fans to a distorted plume that extends for 5 arcminutes. In large scales the jets appear bend, maybe due to ram pressure as the galaxy moves through the intracluster medium.

X-ray emission has been detected by the radio jet, indicating the contribution of synchroton mechanism to the creation of the jet. The radio plumes are regions with decreased X-ray emission.

The most accepted theory for the energy source of active galactic nuclei is the presence of an accretion disk around a supermassive black hole. The mass of the black hole in the centre of NGC 7720 is estimated to be 10^{9.28} (1.9 billion) M_{☉} based on stellar velocity dispersion or 10^{9.26} (1.81 billion) M_{☉} based on mass of the bulge.

== Nearby galaxies ==
NGC 7720 is the dominant galaxy in Abell 2634 galaxy cluster. It is classified as a poor galaxy cluster and has a total X-ray luminosity of (1.4±0.3)×10^{44} erg/s, which is considered low in relation to other similar clusters. X-ray bolometric luminosity has a central peak which corresponds to NGC 7720, while excess emission is to the southwest, perpendicularly to the radio jets.

About 118 galaxies lie within half degree from the centre of the cluster and are considered to be members of the cluster. Abell 2634 forms a pair with galaxy cluster Abell 2666, which is located 3 degrees to the east, but has lower redshift. Both clusters lie behind the Perseus–Pisces Supercluster. Abell 2622 lies behind Abell 2634, at about double the redshift.

== See also ==
- NGC 383 - a similar radio galaxy
