= NGC 4402 =

Spiral galaxy in the constellation Virgo

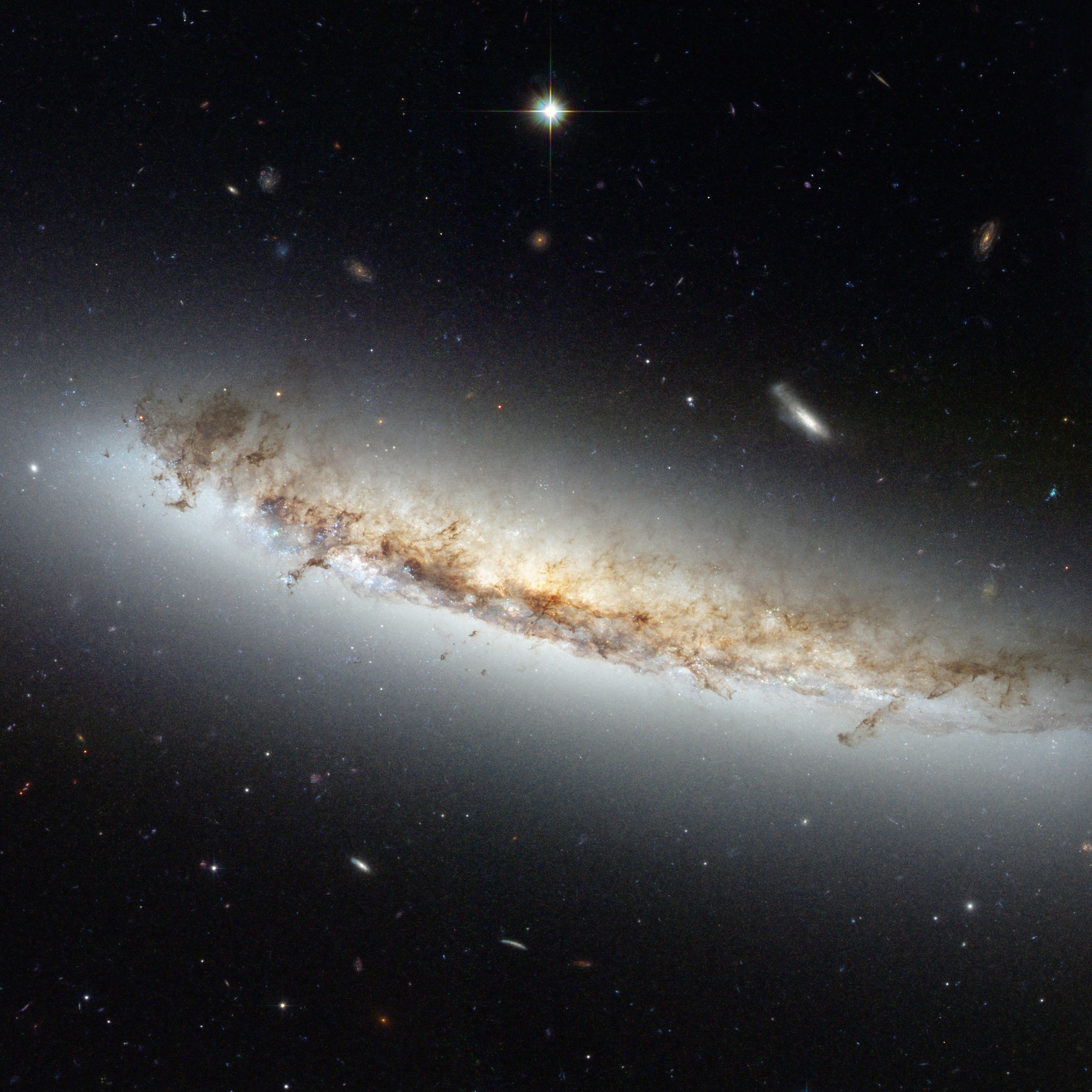
- Hubble Space Telescope image of NGC 4402

Observation data (J2000 epoch)
- Constellation: Virgo
- Right ascension: 12^{h} 26^{m} 07.566^{s}
- Declination: +13° 06′ 46.06″
- Redshift: 0.000774
- Heliocentric radial velocity: 232
- Distance: 48.38 ± 13.37 Mly (14.833 ± 4.098 Mpc)
- Group or cluster: Virgo Cluster
- Apparent magnitude (B): 12.55

Characteristics
- Type: (d)Sc
- Size: 55,000 ly (17,000 pc)
- Apparent size (V): 2.967' × 0.593'
- Notable features: Edge-on spiral galaxy near Markarian's Chain

Other designations
- UGC 7528, MCG+02-32-044, PGC 40644, VCC 873

NGC 4402 is a relatively near, edge-on spiral galaxy located around 50 million light-years from Earth. It is in the constellation of Virgo within the Virgo Cluster of galaxies. It can be seen when viewing Markarian's Chain.

NGC 4402 is roughly 55 thousand light-years wide and is moving away from Earth at around 232 kilometers per second. It is falling into the Virgo galaxy cluster. Images show evidence that the material it once contained to enable it to form stars has been stripped away in a process known as "ram-pressure stripping". This is due to NGC 4402's cooler gasses being struck by hot x-ray gasses coming from the middle of the Virgo galaxy cluster as it moves toward it.

- There is apparent truncation of the NGC 4402's dust disk.
- An upward bowing of the dusty disk is apparent. This is caused by a wind of hot gas.
- Light coming from the far side of the stellar disk appears dim and reddish. This may be because pressure coming from the cluster gas is being forced between the disk and the observer.
- The bottom part of the main disk shows dust in the form of linear filaments. These are being ablated in a characteristic "outside-in" manner.

NGC 4402 will likely transition into a jellyfish galaxy as it falls further towards the center of the galaxy cluster. GALEX observations of the galaxy do not appear to show trailing gas, dust and star formation streamers extending from the disc, indicating that the galaxy has likely begun to feel the effects of the ram pressure stripping only recently. NGC 4402 will likely lose a significant fraction of its star formation material to this process, rendering it an anemic galaxy.

== Supernova ==
One supernova has been observed in NGC 4402: SN 1976B (type unknown, mag. 16.5) was discovered by Miklós Lovas on 28 February 1976.

== Gallery ==
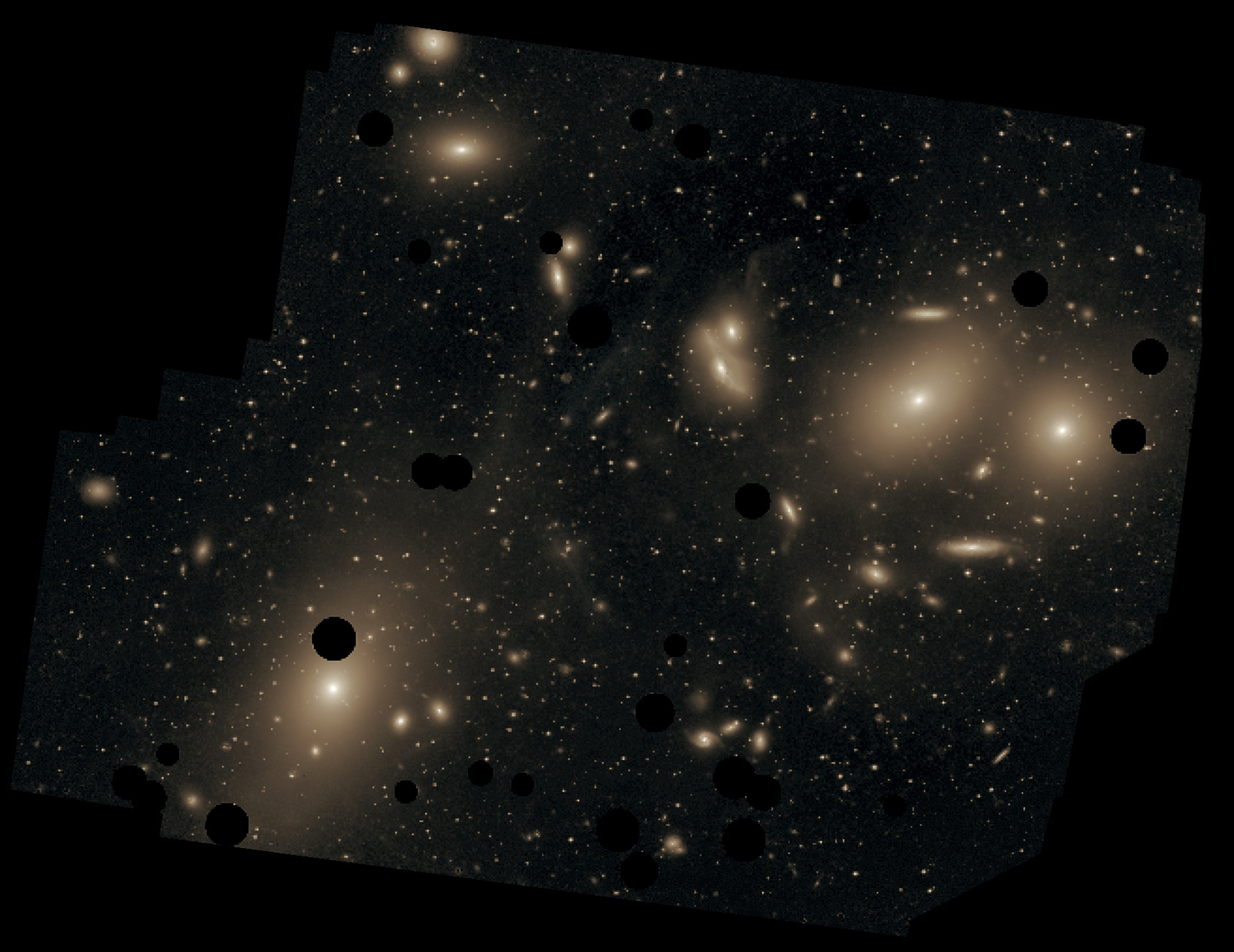
NGC 4402 and other galaxies viewed through the Burrell Schmidt telescope. The black circles were put there to remove bright, foreground stars.

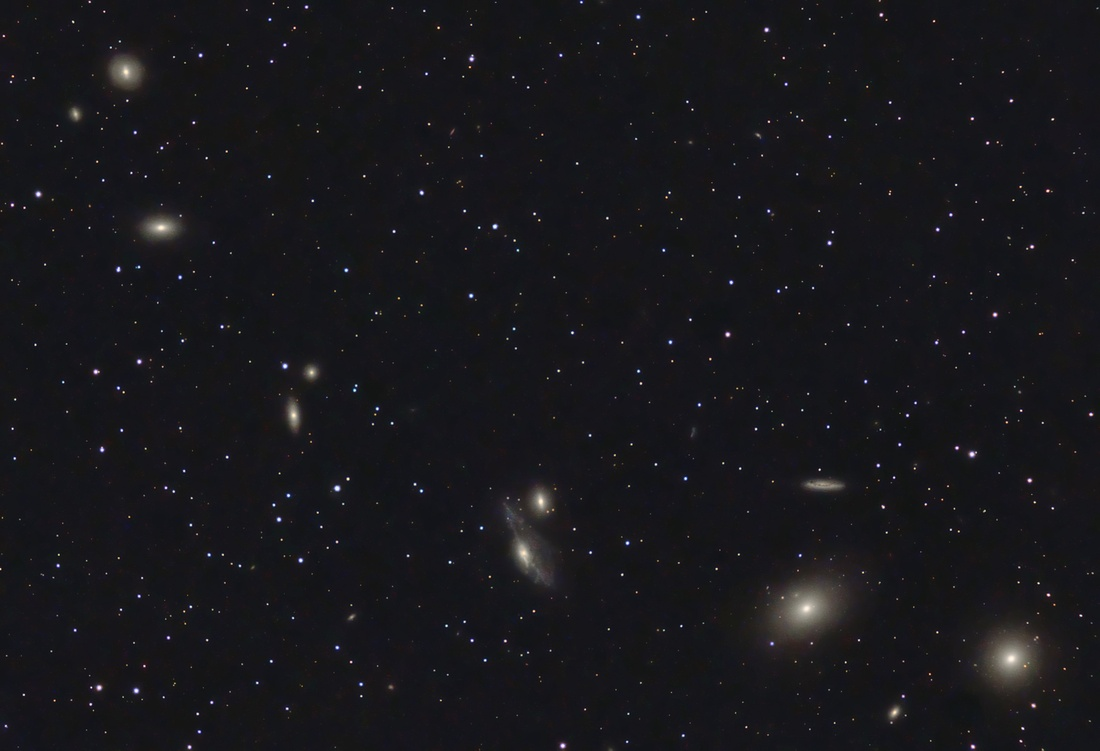
NGC 4402 visible in an image of Markarian's Chain. Click the image then move the cursor over it to reveal the location of NGC 4402.

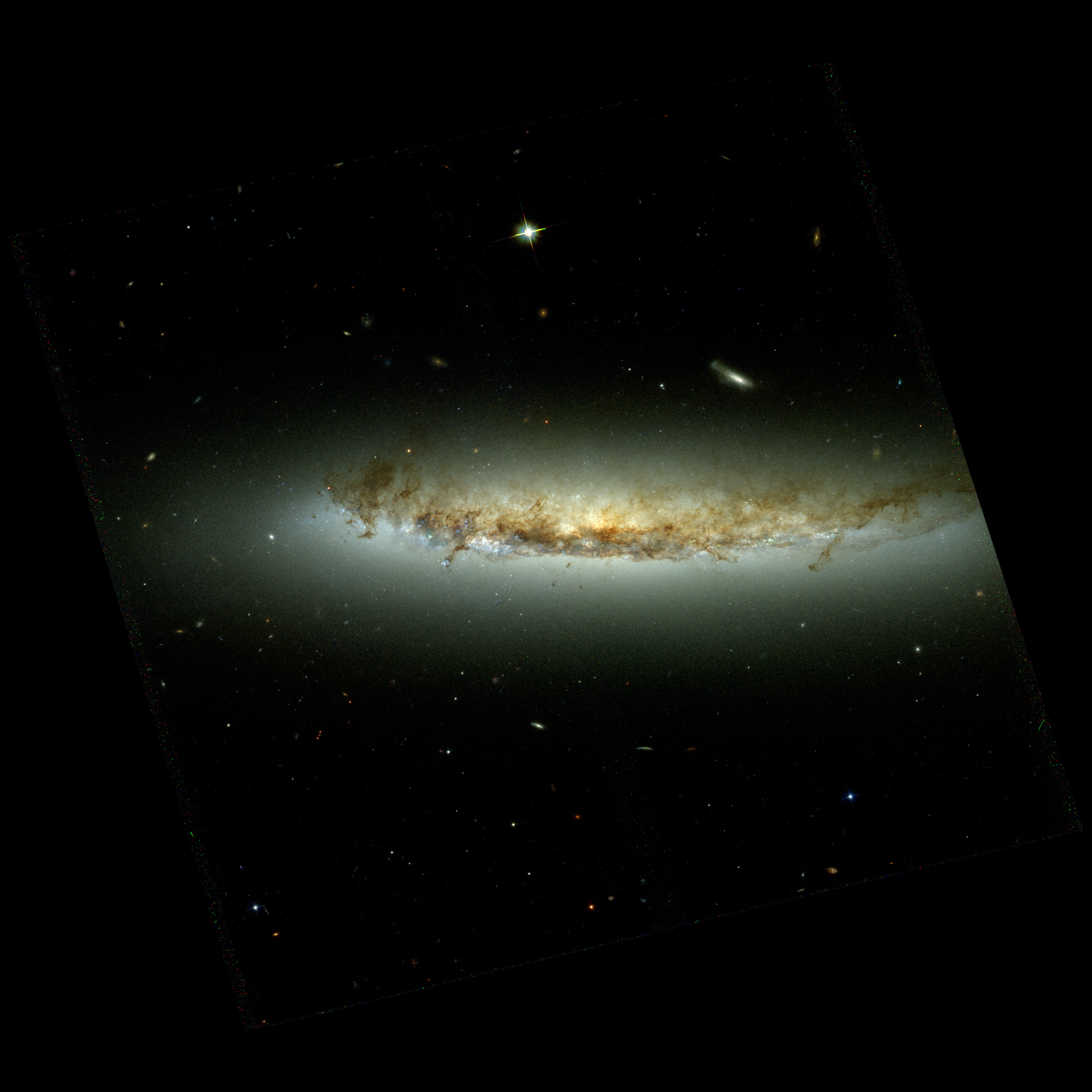
NGC 4402 with color rendering

== See also ==
- List of NGC objects (4001–5000)
