= Blue blob =

Type of stellar system

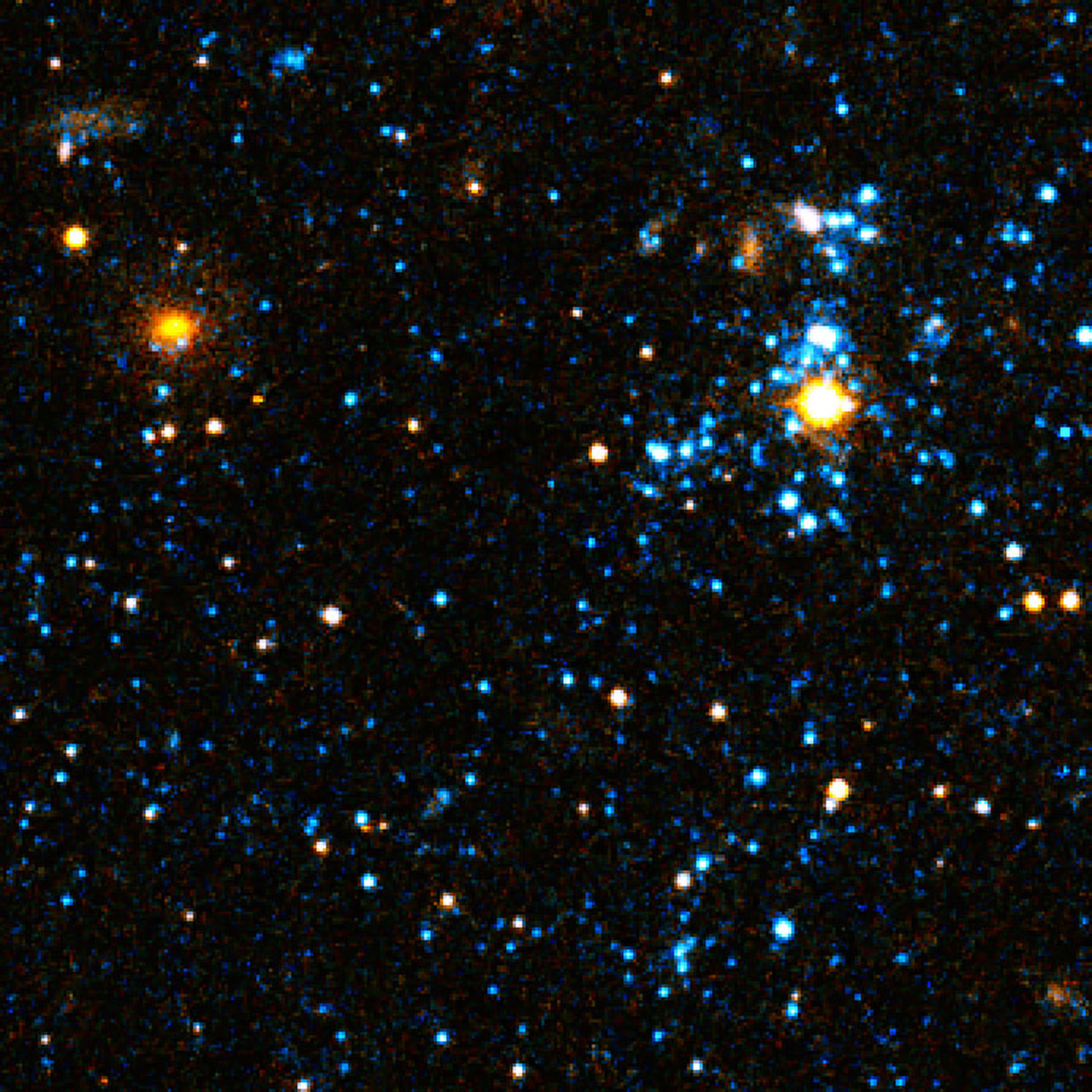

A blue blob is a type of stellar system found in intergalactic space. Blue blobs usually consist of several clusters and star-forming regions within a few kpc, with no sign of an older stellar population. There is nothing in the vicinity of these blue blobs, as they are surrounded by intergalactic space, sometimes for hundreds of kiloparsecs. Currently, at least 6 blue blobs are known, all located in the Virgo Cluster. Blue blobs are also sometimes known as Ram Pressure Dwarfs, due to their formation likely being due to ram-pressure stripping of gas from nearby galaxies, which drifted through intergalactic space and then went through starburst, producing these blue blobs.

== Discovery ==
The first blue blob discovered was SECCO 1, first identified as an interesting object in 2015 and then later identified as the first blue blob (or what could be described as a blue blob) in 2016. SECCO 1 is also known as AGC 226067, and it was identified as a gas cloud in a 2007 Arecibo survey for intergalactic H I clouds. Later, 4 other such blue blobs were identified in the Virgo Cluster. A recent Zooniverse project looking for blue blobs and dwarf spheroidal galaxies in the Fornax Cluster and Virgo Cluster will probably identify some more blue blobs.

== Properties ==
Blue blobs consist of several clumps of star-forming areas, filled with young blue stars, clusters and H II regions. Their stellar masses are very small, only about 50,000 to 100,000 M☉. The oldest stellar populations in the observed blue blobs are no older than 160 million years old in the oldest case, to just 50 million years old in the youngest. However, it is possible that there exist stars which formed before starburst began, and they may be detectable with observations from JWST.

=== Metallicity ===
The observed blue blobs have extremely high metallicities for their small mass. They have O/H values ranging from 8.3 to 8.7, which is in the regime of the metallicities of large galaxies such as the LMC and the Milky Way, or in other words, a significant percentage of that of the Milky Way. This is much higher than the metallicities of galaxies of its mass, which made it hard to explain their formation. The only source of high-metallicity material in the area were the large galaxies of the Virgo Cluster, which means that the blue blobs could not have formed on their own, but must have been formed from material from these other galaxies.

== Formation hypothesis ==
This means that the blue blobs couldn’t have formed on their own, and are likely composed of high-metallicity gas stripped off large, infalling galaxies (only galaxies which are new members of the Virgo Cluster) via ram pressure stripping. Hence they can also be thought of as ‘ram pressure dwarfs’. After some time floating in intergalactic space, these blobs of metal-rich gas would quickly go through a starburst phase, producing the blue blobs.
