= Anemic galaxy =

Type of spiral galaxy

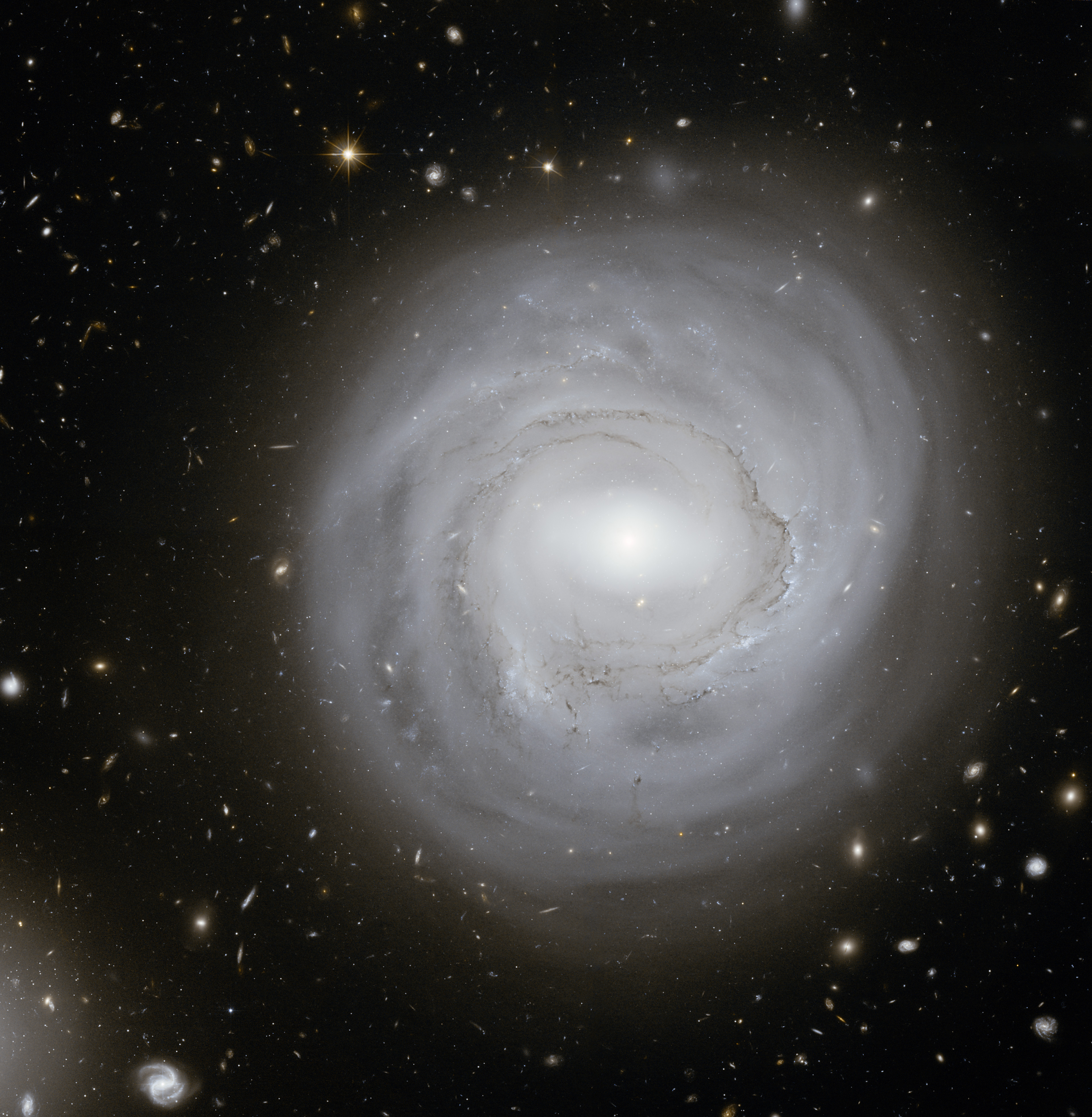
NGC 4921, a typical anemic galaxy.

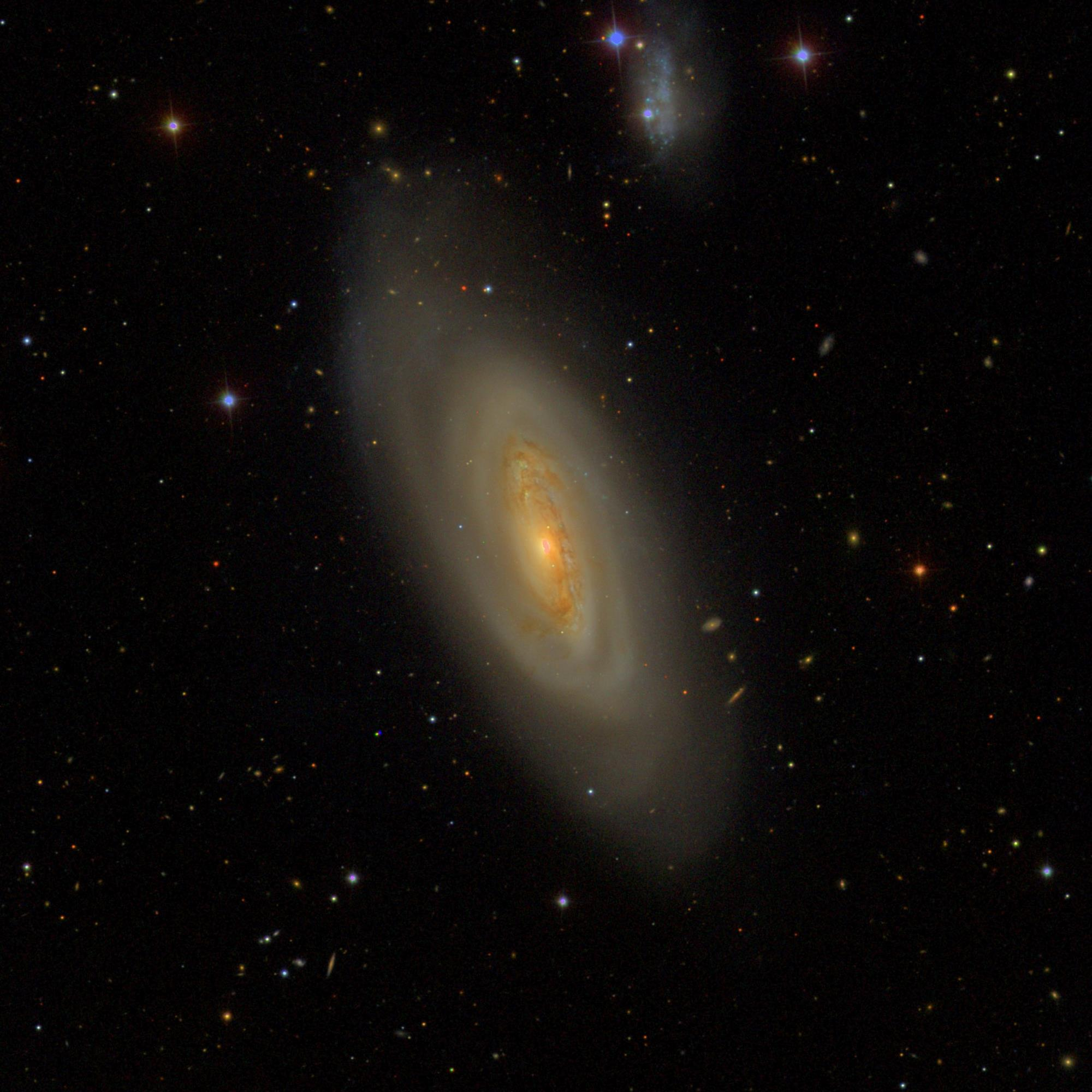
NGC 4569 is also an example of an anemic galaxy.

An anemic galaxy is a type of spiral galaxy characterized by a low contrast between its spiral arms and its disk.

== Etymology ==
The term was coined in 1976 by the Canadian astronomer Sidney van den Bergh to classify galaxies that are an intermediate form between the gas-rich, star-forming spiral galaxies and the gas-poor, inactive lenticular galaxies.

== Characteristics ==
Anemic galaxies not only show spiral arms of low contrast but also a low content and density of neutral hydrogen (the raw material needed to form stars), redder colours than a normal spiral, fewer H II regions, and thus a low star formation activity.

At first it was believed their molecular hydrogen content was similar to that of a normal spiral, but subsequent studies have shown that a number of them are deficient in molecular gas.

Anemic galaxies should not be confused with galaxies with red colors due to a low star formation activity but which show a normal content of neutral gas, as is the case of the Andromeda Galaxy.

== Evolution ==
As most galaxies of this type are present in rich galaxy clusters, it has been proposed that this may be one of the reasons that normal spirals convert into anemic ones. Studies of spiral galaxies in the nearby Virgo Cluster have shown not only how, unlike in isolated spiral galaxies, in most cases their neutral gas and star formation are truncated within their optical disks, in some cases quite severely, but also how star formation activity in them is lower than in spirals outside clusters; this means that processes that take place in galaxy clusters, such as interactions with the intracluster medium like ram-pressure stripping and/or interactions with other neighboring galaxies, are responsible for the origin of anemic galaxies, stripping the normal spirals of their gas, increasing in some cases their star formation activity, and thus in the end quenching the latter as their gas is exhausted and not replenished. Spiral galaxies may have become anemic ones by exhausting their supply of gas via star formation activity.

An anemic galaxy's most probable fate is to lose its remaining gas and star formation, becoming similar to a lenticular galaxy: it therefore is likely that most lenticular galaxies in clusters, are former spiral galaxies.

== Passive spiral galaxies ==
Passive spiral galaxies (also known as passive spirals) are a type of spiral galaxy located in rich galaxy clusters at high redshifts that present spiral structure, but little or no star formation, in some cases hidden by dust and concentrated within their innermost regions. Often, they seem to have few or no massive (>20 solar masses) stars.

According to computer simulations, they are systems on the way to becoming lenticular galaxies as they have lost the hydrogen that is assumed to be present in the haloes of spiral galaxies and that replenishes them with new gas to form stars.

While they share at least some properties with anemic galaxies, their relationship with them is unclear: they may be a more advanced stage in the evolution of a spiral galaxy to become a lenticular than the anemic galaxies, or passive spirals and anemic galaxies may be the same type of object, the difference being that the former are much farther away than the latter.

== Examples ==
NGC 4921 in the Coma Cluster and Messier 90 in the Virgo Cluster are examples of this type of galaxy; however, most spiral galaxies of the latter are more or less deficient in gas.
