= NGC 4921 =

Galaxy in the constellation Coma Berenices

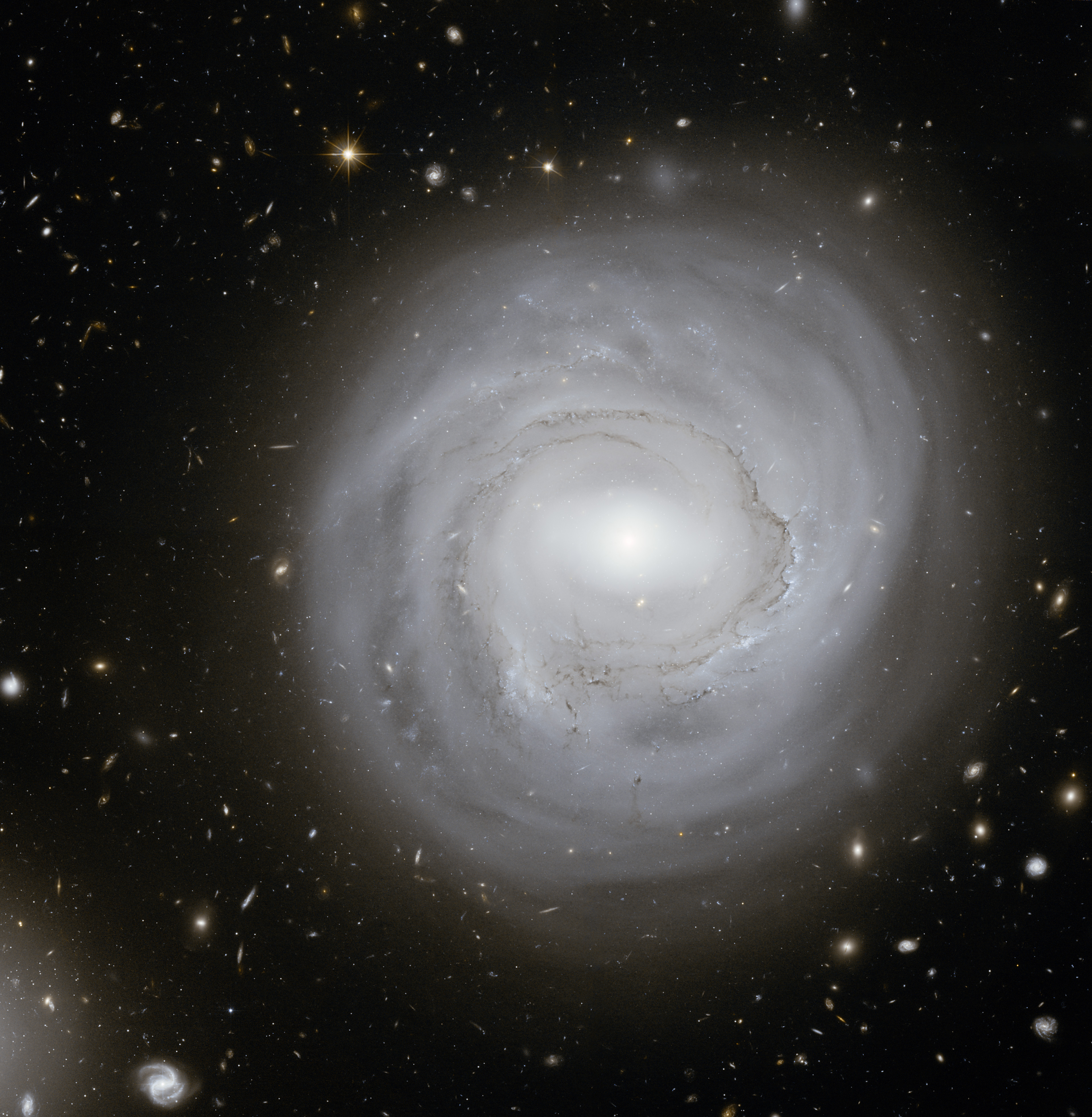
- NGC 4921 in a combination of near-infrared and yellow light

Observation data (J2000 epoch)
- Constellation: Coma Berenices
- Right ascension: 13^{h} 01^{m} 26.1196^{s}
- Declination: +27° 53′ 09.602″
- Redshift: 0.018286; 5,482 km/s
- Distance: ca. 320 Mly
- Group or cluster: Coma Cluster
- Apparent magnitude (V): 13.04

Characteristics
- Type: SB(rs)ab
- Size: ~293,800 ly (90.07 kpc) (estimated)
- Apparent size (V): 2.5′ × 2.2′

Other designations
- UGC 8134, MCG +05-31-098, PGC 44899, CGCG 160-095

NGC 4921 is a large barred spiral galaxy in the Coma Cluster, located in the constellation of Coma Berenices. It was discovered by German-British astronomer William Herschel on 11 April 1785. It is about 320 million light-years from Earth. The galaxy has a nucleus with a bar structure that is surrounded by a distinct ring of dust that contains recently formed, hot blue stars. The outer part consists of unusually smooth, poorly distinguished spiral arms.

In 1976, the Canadian astronomer Sidney Van den Bergh categorized this galaxy as "anemic" because of the low rate at which stars are being formed. He noted that it has "an unusually low surface brightness and exhibits remarkably diffuse spiral arms". Nonetheless, it is the brightest spiral galaxy in the Coma Cluster. This galaxy is located near the center of the cluster and has a high relative velocity (7,560 km/s) compared to the mean cluster velocity. When examined at the 21 cm wavelength Hydrogen line, NGC 4921 was found to be strongly H I deficient, indicating that it is low in hydrogen. The distribution of hydrogen has also been deeply perturbed toward the SE spiral arm and is less extended than the optical disk of the galaxy. This may have been caused by interaction with the intergalactic medium, which is stripping off the gas via ram pressure. Some filaments of gas that have been stripped away are falling back to the galaxy, making NGC 4921 possibly the first observational evidence of this fallback.

== Supernova ==
One supernova has been observed in NGC 4921. On May 4, 1959, Milton Humason discovered SN 1959B (type unknown, mag. 18.5) in this galaxy using a Schmidt telescope at the Palomar Observatory. It appeared "quite far from the center" of the galaxy. The light curve proved similar to supernova SN 1987A in the Large Magellanic Cloud, and it displayed "unusual photometric behavior".

== See also ==
- List of NGC objects (4001–5000)
