= Ram pressure =

Pressure due to movement through a fluid medium

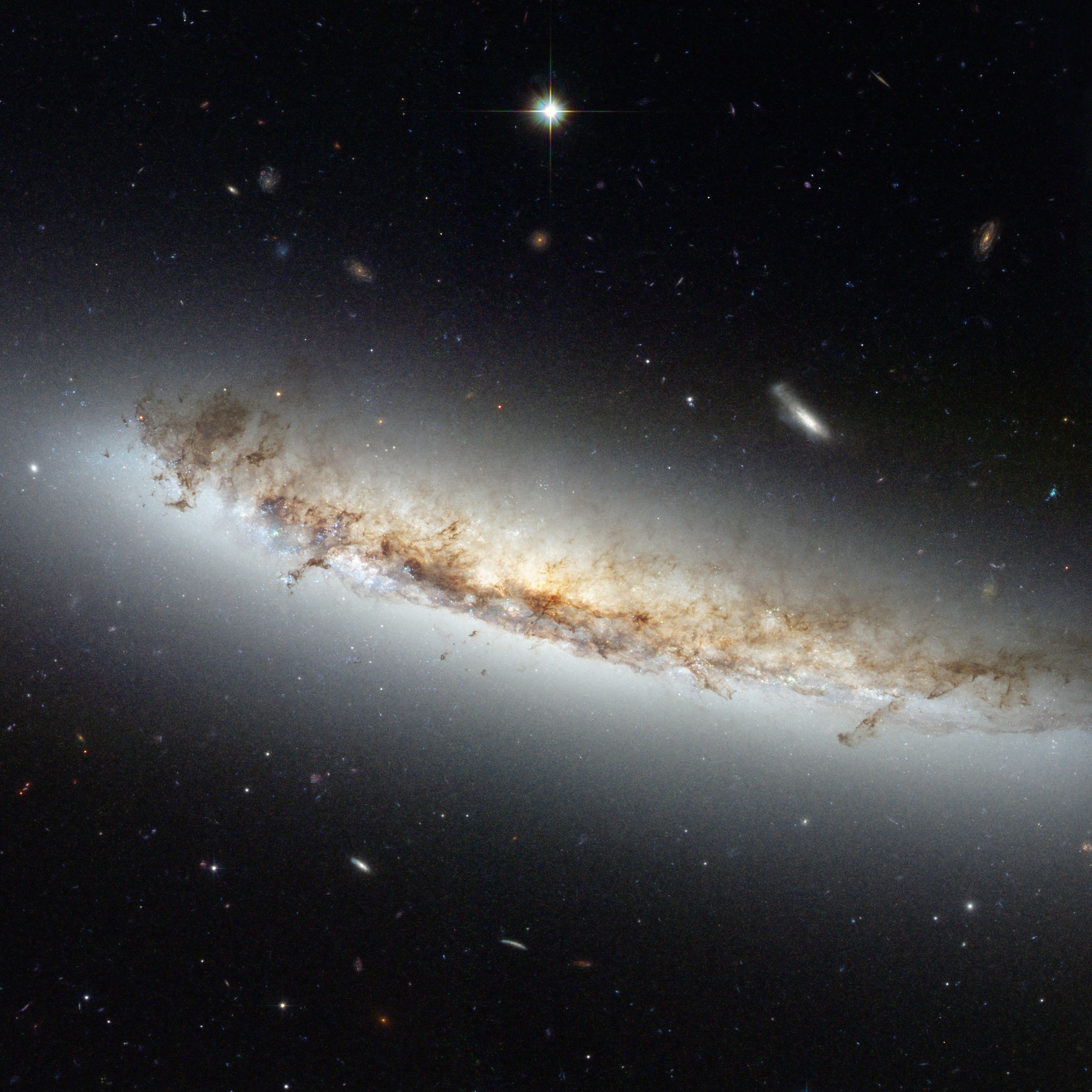
Ram pressure stripping in NGC 4402 as it falls towards the Virgo Supercluster (off image, toward bottom left). Note the dust (brown) trailing behind (toward upper right) the galaxy, versus the dust-free (blue-white) leading edge.

Ram pressure is a pressure exerted on a body moving through a fluid medium, caused by relative bulk motion of the fluid rather than random thermal motion. It causes a drag force to be exerted on the body. Ram pressure is given in tensor form as

$P_\text{ram}= \rho u_i u_j$,

where $\rho$ is the density of the fluid; $P_\text{ram}$ is the momentum flux per second in the $i$ direction through a surface with normal in the $j$ direction. $u_i,u_j$ are the components of the fluid velocity in these directions. The total Cauchy stress tensor $\sigma_{ij}$ is the sum of this ram pressure and the isotropic thermal pressure (in the absence of viscosity).

In the simple case when the relative velocity is normal to the surface, and momentum is fully transferred to the object, the ram pressure becomes

$$P_\text{ram} = 1/2 \rho u^2$$.

== Derivation ==
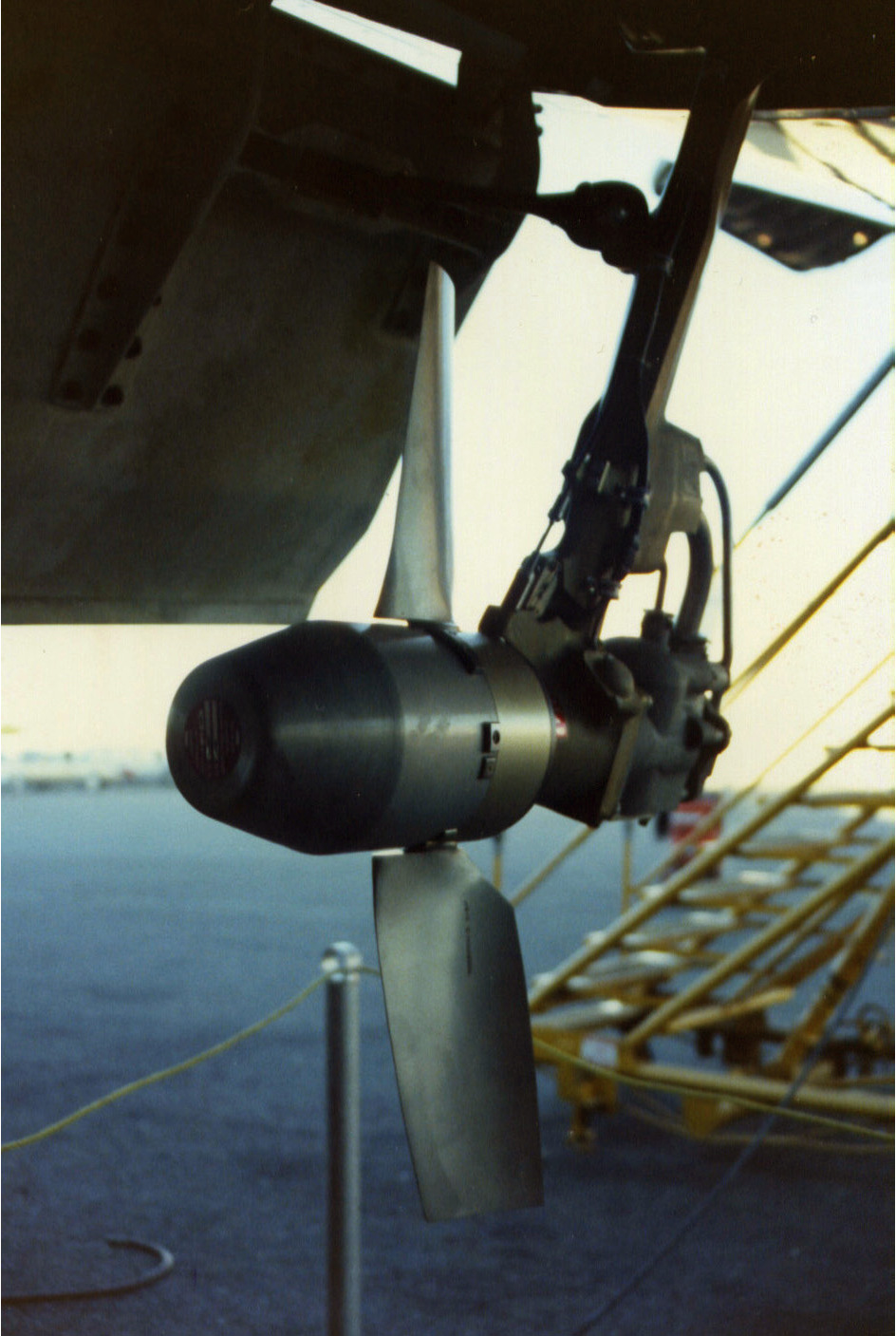
An example of a ram air turbine (RAT). RATs generate power by rotation of the turbine via ram pressure.

The Eulerian form of the Cauchy momentum equation for a fluid is

$$\rho\frac{\partial \vec u}{\partial t} = -\vec \nabla p - \rho(\vec u \cdot \vec \nabla)\vec u + \rho \vec g$$

for isotropic pressure $p$, where $\vec u$ is fluid velocity, $\rho$ the fluid density, and $\vec g$ the gravitational acceleration. The Eulerian rate of change of momentum in direction $i$ at a point is thus (using Einstein notation):

$$\begin{align}\frac{\partial}{\partial t}(\rho u_i) &= u_i\frac{\partial \rho}{\partial t}+\rho \frac{\partial u_i}{\partial t}\\
&= u_i \frac{\partial \rho}{\partial t} -\frac{\partial p}{\partial x_i} -\rho u_j \frac{\partial u_i}{\partial x_j} + \rho g_i.\end{align}$$

Substituting the conservation of mass, expressed as

$$\frac{\partial \rho}{\partial t} = -\vec \nabla \cdot (\rho \vec u )= -\frac{\partial (\rho u_j)}{\partial x_j}$$,

this is equivalent to

$$\begin{align}
\frac{\partial}{\partial t}(\rho u_i) &= -\frac{\partial p}{\partial x_i} + \rho g_i - \frac{\partial}{\partial x_j}(\rho u_i u_j)\\
&= -\frac{\partial}{\partial x_j}\left[\delta_{ij} p + \rho u_i u_j\right]+ \rho g_i\end{align}$$

using the product rule and the Kronecker delta $\delta_{ij}$. The first term in the brackets is the isotropic thermal pressure, and the second is the ram pressure.

In this context, ram pressure is momentum transfer by advection (flow of matter carrying momentum across a surface into a body). The mass per unit second flowing into a volume $V$ bounded by a surface $S$ is

$$-\oint_S \rho \vec u \cdot \mathrm{d}\vec S$$

and the momentum per second it carries into the body is

$$-\oint_S \vec u \rho \vec u \cdot \mathrm{d}\vec S = -\int_V \frac{\partial}{\partial x_j}\left[u_i \rho u_j\right]\mathrm{d}V,$$

equal to the ram pressure term. This discussion can be extended to 'drag' forces; if all matter incident upon a surface transfers all its momentum to the volume, this is equivalent (in terms of momentum transfer) to the matter entering the volume (the context above). On the other hand, if only velocity perpendicular to the surface is transferred, there are no shear forces, and the effective pressure on that surface increases by

$$P_\text{ram} = 1/2 \rho u_n^2$$,

where $u_n$ is the velocity component perpendicular to the surface.

== Example - sea level ram air pressure ==
What is the sea level ram air pressure at 100 mph?

=== Imperial units ===
- ρ = 0.0023769 sea level air density (slugs/ft^{3})
- v^{2} = 147^{2} (100 mph = 147 ft/sec)
- P = 0.5 × ρ × v^{2}
- P = 25.68 (pressure in lbf/ft^{2})

=== SI units ===
- ρ = 1.2250 sea level air density (kg/m^{3})
- v^{2} = 44.7^{2} (100 mph = 44.7 m/s)
- P = 0.5 × ρ × v^{2}
- P = 1224 (pressure in Pa = N/m^{2})

Air density for selected altitudes
Altitude (ft)	Air density (slugs/ft^{3})	Altitude (m)	Air density (kg/m^{3})
sea level	0.0023769	0	1.2250
5000	0.0020482	1524	1.0556
10000	0.0017555	3048	0.9047
20000	0.0012673	6096	0.6531
50000	0.0003817	15240	0.1967
100000	0.0000331	30480	0.0171

== Astrophysical examples of ram pressure ==
=== Galactic ram pressure stripping ===
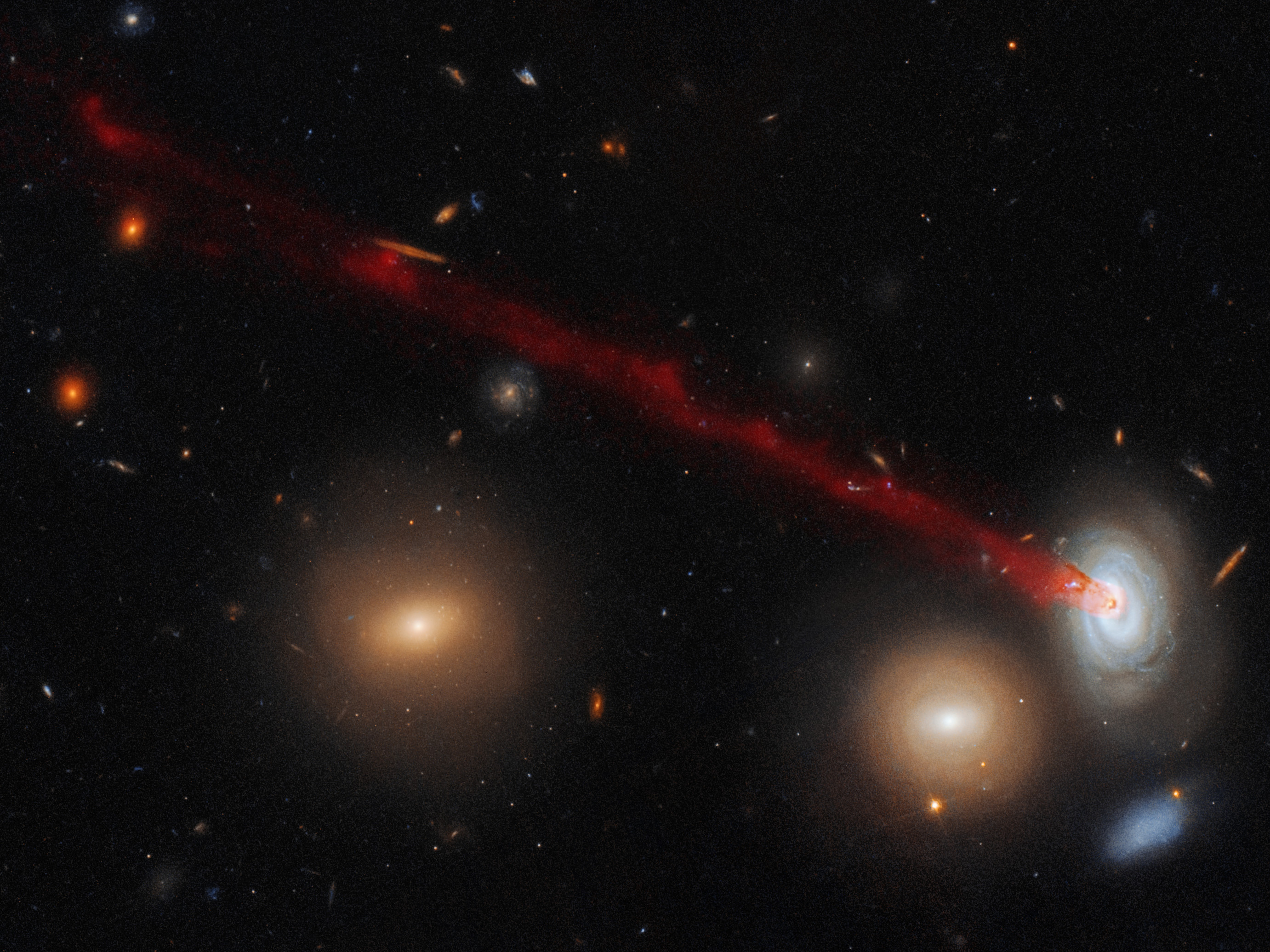
Tails in spiral galaxy D100, found in the Coma Cluster, are created by ram-pressure stripping.

Within astronomy and astrophysics, James E. Gunn and J. Richard Gott first suggested that galaxies in a galaxy cluster moving through a hot intracluster medium would experience a pressure of

$$P_r \approx  1/2 \rho_e v^2$$

where $P_r$ is the ram pressure, $\rho_e$ the intracluster gas density, and $v$ the speed of the galaxy relative to the medium. This pressure can strip gas out of the galaxy where, essentially, the gas is gravitationally bound to the galaxy less strongly than the force from the intracluster medium 'wind' due to the ram pressure. Evidence of this ram pressure stripping can be seen in the image of NGC 4402. These ram pressure stripped galaxies will often have a large trailing tail and because of this they are commonly called "Jellyfish galaxies."

Ram pressure stripping is thought to have profound effects on the evolution of galaxies. As galaxies fall toward the center of a cluster, more and more of their gas is stripped out, including the cool, denser gas that is the source of continued star formation. Spiral galaxies that have fallen at least to the core of both the Virgo and Coma clusters have had their gas (neutral hydrogen) depleted in this way and simulations suggest that this process can happen relatively quickly, with 100% depletion occurring in 100 million years to a more gradual few billion years.

Recent radio observation of carbon monoxide (CO) emission from three galaxies (NGC 4330, NGC 4402, and NGC 4522) in the Virgo cluster point to the molecular gas not being stripped but instead being compressed by the ram pressure. Increased Hα emission, a sign of star formation, corresponds to the compressed CO region, suggesting that star formation may be accelerated, at least temporarily, while ram pressure stripping of neutral hydrogen is ongoing.

More recently, it has been shown that ram pressure can also lead to the removal of gas in isolated dwarf galaxies that plunge through the cosmic web (the so-called cosmic web stripping process). Although the typical overdensity within the cosmic web is significantly lower than that found in the environment of galaxy clusters, the high relative speed between a dwarf and the cosmic web renders ram pressure efficient. This is an attractive mechanism to explain not only the presence of isolated dwarf galaxies away from galaxy clusters with particularly low hydrogen abundance to stellar mass ratio, but also the compression of gas in the centre of a dwarf galaxy and the subsequent reignition of star formation.

=== Ram pressure and atmospheric entry/re-entry ===
==== In meteoroids ====
Meteoroids enter Earth's atmosphere from outer space traveling at hypersonic speeds of at least 11 km/s (7 mi/s) and often much faster. Despite moving through the rarified upper reaches of Earth's atmosphere the immense speed at which a meteor travels nevertheless rapidly compresses the air in its path, creating a shock wave. The meteoroid then experiences what is known as ram pressure. As the air in front of the meteoroid is compressed its temperature quickly rises. This is not due to friction, rather it is simply a consequence of many molecules and atoms being made to occupy a smaller space than formerly. Ram pressure and the very high temperatures it causes are the reasons few meteors make it all the way to the ground and most simply burn up or are ablated into tiny fragments. Larger or more solid meteorites may explode instead in a meteor airburst.

===== Airburst explosions =====
The use of the term explosion is somewhat loose in this context, and can be confusing. This confusion is exacerbated by the tendency for airburst energies to be expressed in terms of nuclear weapon yields, as when the Tunguska airburst is given a rating in megatons of TNT. Large meteoroids do not explode in the sense of chemical or nuclear explosives. Rather, at a critical moment in its atmospheric entry the enormous ram pressure experienced by the leading face of the meteoroid converts the body's immense momentum into a force blowing it apart over a nearly instantaneous span of time.

In essence, the meteoroid is ripped apart by its own speed. This occurs when fine tendrils of superheated air force their way into cracks and faults in the leading face's surface. Once this high pressure plasma gains entry to the meteoroid's interior it exerts tremendous force on the body's internal structure. This occurs because the superheated air now exerts its force over a much larger surface area, as when the wind suddenly fills a sail. This sudden rise in the force exerted on the meteoroid overwhelms the body's structural integrity and it begins to break up. The breakup of the meteoroid yields an even larger total surface area for the superheated air to act upon and a cycle of amplification rapidly occurs. This is the explosion, and it causes the meteoroid to disintegrate with hypersonic velocity, a speed comparable to that of explosive detonation.

==== In spacecraft ====
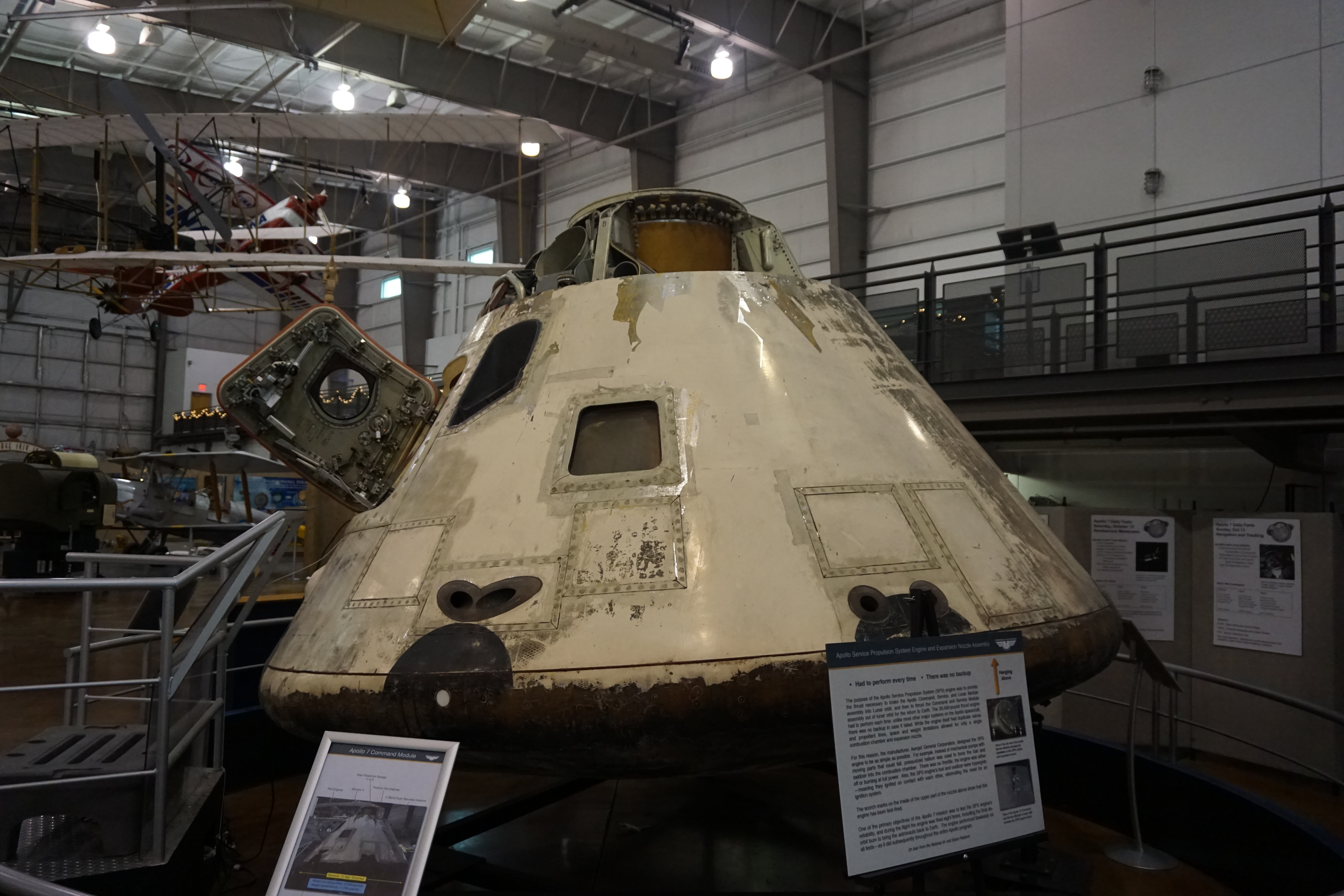
Apollo 7 Command Module

Harry Julian Allen and Alfred J. Eggers of NACA used an insight about ram pressure to propose the blunt-body concept: a large, blunt body entering the atmosphere creates a boundary layer of compressed air which serves as a buffer between the body surface and the compression-heated air. In other words, kinetic energy is converted into heated air via ram pressure, and that heated air is quickly moved away from object surface with minimal physical interaction, and hence minimal heating of the body. This was counter-intuitive at the time, when sharp, streamlined profiles were assumed to be better. This blunt-body concept was used in Apollo-era capsules.

== See also ==
- Ram-air intake – an air intake system that aids in engine performance and cooling, commonly used on aircraft and other high-performance vehicles
- Ram air turbine – a propeller used by aircraft to generate power
- Parafoil – a non-rigid parachute airfoil inflated by wind, also known as a ram-air parachute
- Blue blob - ram-pressure stripping of gas from galaxies
