= Galactic astronomy =

Study of the Milky Way galaxy and its contents

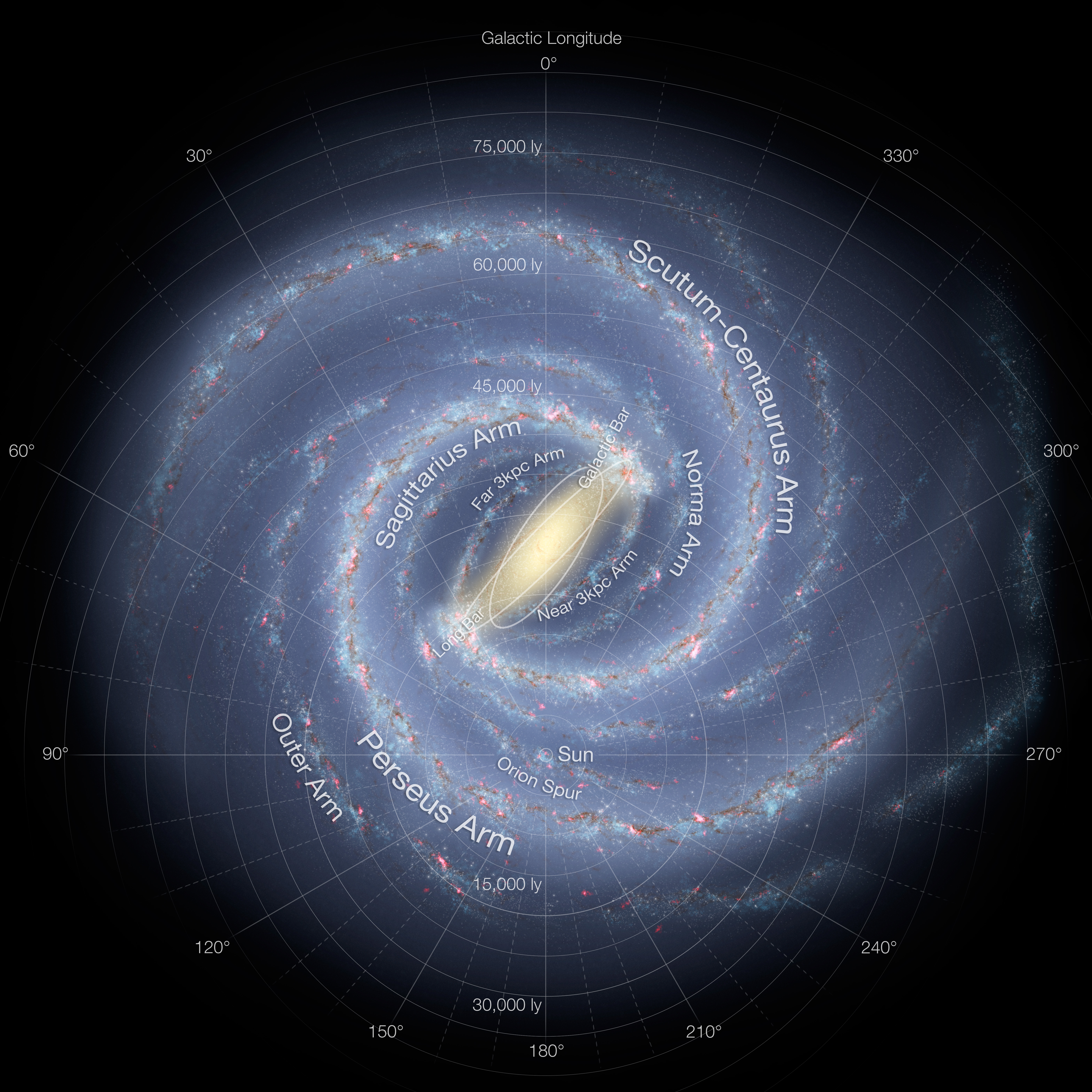
An artist's conception of the Milky Way

Galactic astronomy is the study of the Milky Way galaxy and all its contents. This is in contrast to extragalactic astronomy, which is the study of everything outside our galaxy, including all other galaxies.

Galactic astronomy should not be confused with galaxy formation and evolution, which is the general study of galaxies, their formation, structure, components, dynamics, interactions, and the range of forms they take.

The Milky Way galaxy, where the Solar System is located, is in many ways the best-studied galaxy, although important parts of it are obscured from view in visible wavelengths by regions of cosmic dust. The development of radio astronomy, infrared astronomy and submillimetre astronomy in the 20th century allowed the gas and dust of the Milky Way to be mapped for the first time.

== Subcategories ==
A standard set of subcategories is used by astronomical journals to split up the subject of Galactic Astronomy:

1. abundances – the study of the location of elements heavier than helium
2. bulge – the study of the bulge around the center of the Milky Way
3. center – the study of the central region of the Milky Way
4. disk – the study of the Milky Way disk (the plane upon which most galactic objects are aligned)
5. evolution – the evolution of the Milky Way
6. formation – the formation of the Milky Way
7. fundamental parameters – the fundamental parameters of the Milky Way (mass, size etc.)
8. globular cluster – globular clusters within the Milky Way
9. halo – the large halo of dark matter around the Milky Way
10. kinematics, and dynamics – the motions of stars and clusters
11. nucleus – the region around the black hole at the center of the Milky Way (Sagittarius A*)
12. open clusters and associations – open clusters and associations of stars
13. Solar neighborhood – nearby stars
14. stellar content – numbers and types of stars in the Milky Way
15. structure – the structure (spiral arms etc.)

== Stellar populations ==
- Star clusters
  - Globular clusters
  - Open clusters

== Interstellar medium ==
- Interplanetary space - Interplanetary medium - interplanetary dust
- Interstellar space - Interstellar medium - interstellar dust
- Intergalactic space - Intergalactic medium - Intergalactic dust

== See also ==
- Galaxy
  - Milky Way
- Extragalactic astronomy
