= PKS 1413+135 =

BL Lacertae object in the constellation Boötes

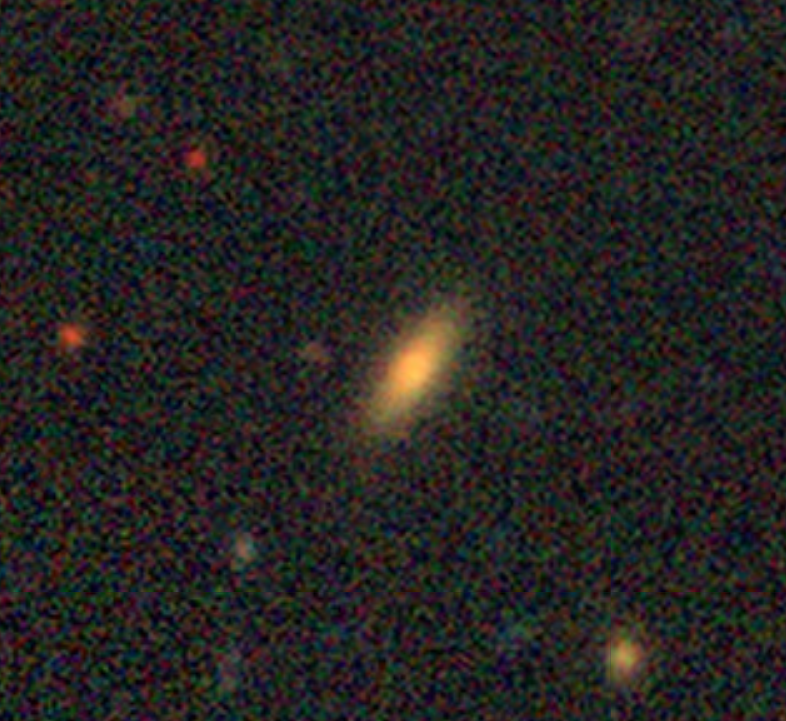
- PKS 1413+135 by DESI Legacy Surveys

Observation data (J2000.0 epoch)
- Constellation: Boötes
- Right ascension: 14^{h} 15^{m} 58.81^{s}
- Declination: +13° 20′ 23.71″
- Redshift: 0.246710
- Heliocentric radial velocity: 73,962 km/s ± 3
- Distance: 3.015 Gly
- Apparent magnitude (V): 20.00
- Apparent magnitude (B): 21.05

Characteristics
- Type: BLLAC
- Size: ~179,000 ly (54.8 kpc) (estimated)

Other designations
- 1413+135, LEDA 2827904, 2MASS J14155881+1320235, IVS B1413+135, OQ +122, NVSS J141558+132024, WB J1415+1320, RFC J1415+1320

PKS 1413+135 is a BL Lacertae object located in the constellation of Boötes. The redshift of the object is (z) 0.246 and it was first discovered by a group of astronomers in April 1991 who found it was hosted by a disc galaxy, with later studies confirming it to be a spiral galaxy, making this exceptionally rare for any BL Lac host galaxies. It also contains a radio spectrum that appears as mainly flat, similar to most blazars.

== Description ==
PKS 1413+135 is categorized as an edge-on spiral galaxy of Sa morphology based on Hubble Space Telescope (HST) imaging, with a long dust lane penetrating through the middle section with a central bulge feature. Further imaging also found the nuclear regions of the galaxy are mainly peanut-shaped with the central bar feature that extends by 0.5 arcseconds in perpendicular direction as the dust lane. The central nucleus of the galaxy has a reddened appearance.

The source of PKS 1413+135 is relatively compact, with a highly inverted radio core and traces of radio emission at the same position of it and also towards the northwest. There is a lack of any kiloparsec-scale extended structures based on radio imaging made by the Very Large Array (VLA).

Radio imaging made with the Very Long Baseline Array (VLBA) at 15 GHz frequencies has found there is a radio jet present, going westwards by three milliarcseconds before bending. There is also a counterjet feature located at the position angle that is similar to the minilobe feature that is located east and also by 180° where the jet first emerged from. A slight extension is found at 43 GHz frequencies. VLBA imaging also suggested that PKS 1413+135 is also a young source, with a complex morphology that is similar to those sources that have compact symmetrical object (CSO) morphology. Molecular absorption clouds have been discovered towards the galaxy.

Studies have also classified PKS 1413+135 as a blazar. It is noted to be highly variable, displaying extreme gamma-ray activity on 29 August 2019, with its average daily flux reaching around 4.8 ± 1.5 × 10^{−7} photons cm^{−2} s^{−1}. On 13 January 2022, a gamma ray flare was shown to be emitted from the galaxy with the daily average flux of 2.2 ± 0.7 × 10^{−7} photons cm^{−2} s^{−1}. More gamma-ray activity has been reported in 2023 and 2025 respectively.
