= NGC 7832 =

Elliptical galaxy

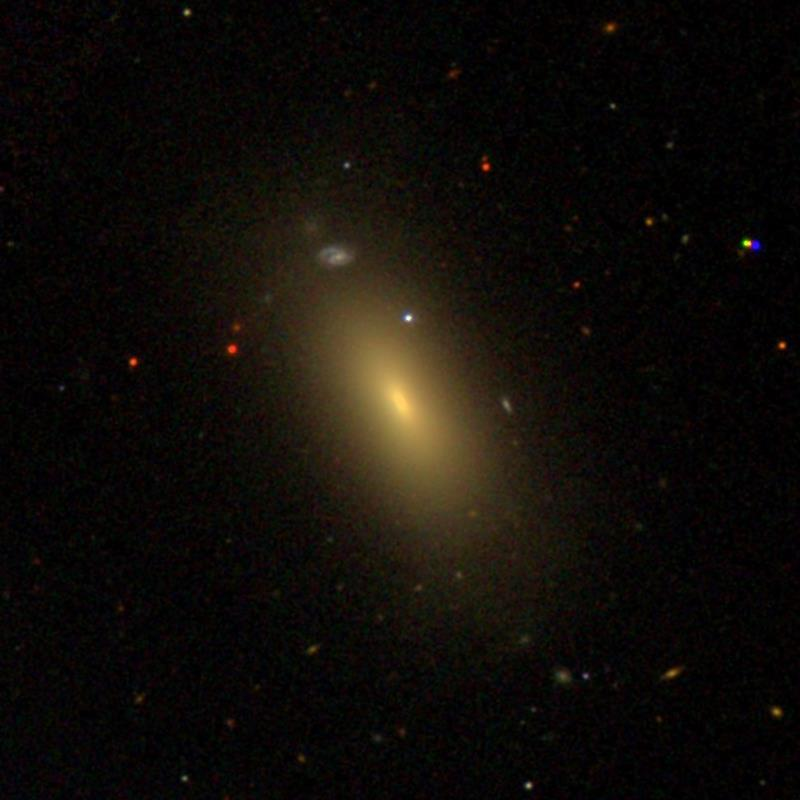
- NGC 7832 by SDSS

Observation data
- Right ascension: 00^{h} 06^{m} 32.9^{s}
- Declination: −03° 43′ 00″
- Redshift: 0.020838
- Heliocentric radial velocity: 6,247 ± 12 km/s
- Galactocentric velocity: 6,341 km/s
- Distance: 239.4 Mly (73.4 Mpc)
- Apparent magnitude (V): 13.2

Characteristics
- Type: E
- Apparent size (V): 1.68′ × 0.38′
- Notable features: Discovered by William Herschel in 1784

Other designations
- IC 5386, PGC 485, MCG -01-01-033

NGC 7832 is an magnitude 13.2 elliptical galaxy located in the constellation Pisces. It was discovered by the astronomer William Herschel on September 20, 1784. NGC 7832 is located close to the celestial equator and it is partly visible from both hemispheres in certain times of the year.

== Observation ==
NGC 7832 is described as very faint, very small, and round, with a significantly brighter nucleus. It lacks the spiral arms or dust lanes typical of spiral galaxies, appearing instead as an elongated orb. It measures approximately 1.68 arcminutes along its major axis and 0.38 arcminutes along its minor axis. With an apparent magnitude of approximately 13.2, it is a relatively faint object that typically requires a large-aperture telescope.

== Physical characteristics ==
NGC 7832 is classified as an elliptical galaxy, lacking spiral arms or prominent dust lanes. This galaxy has a measured redshift of 0.020838 and a heliocentric radial velocity of 6,247 km/s.
