= NGC 6962 =

Galaxy in the constellation of Aquarius

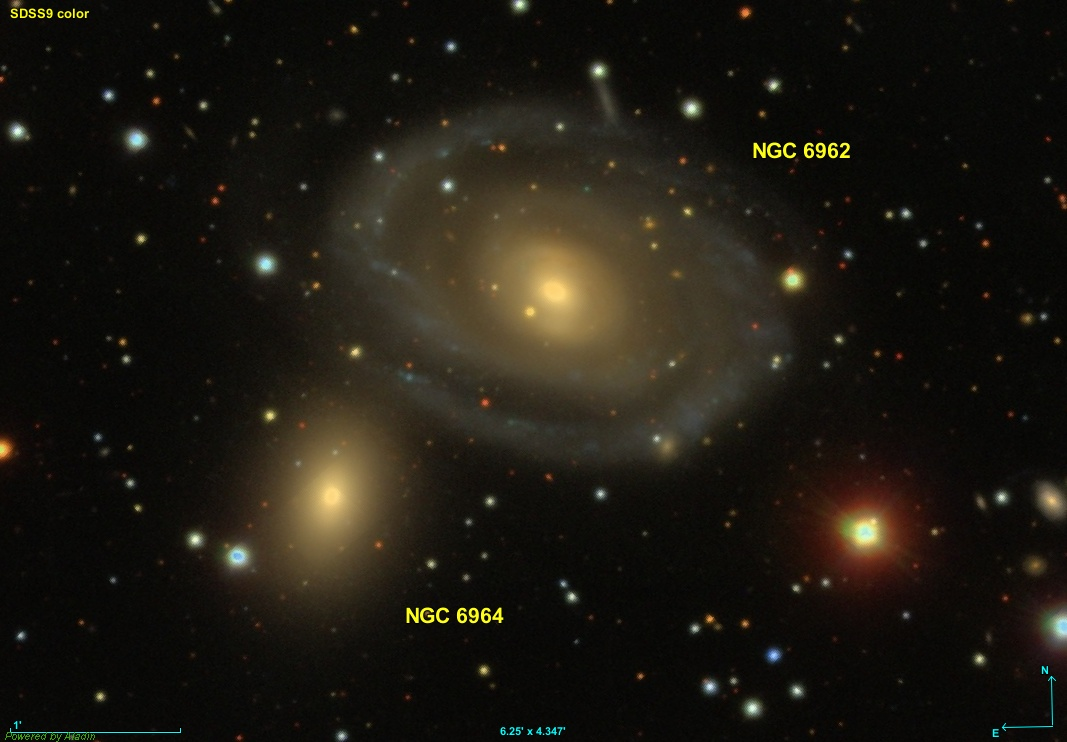
- SDSS image of NGC 6962.

Observation data (J2000 epoch)
- Constellation: Aquarius
- Right ascension: 20^{h} 47^{m} 19.06^{s}
- Declination: +00° 19′ 15.00″
- Redshift: 0.014011
- Heliocentric radial velocity: 4,200 km/s ± 2
- Distance: 182 Mly (55.78 Mpc)
- Apparent magnitude (V): 12.2

Characteristics
- Type: SAB(r)ab
- Size: ~163,500 ly (50.14 kpc) (estimated)

Other designations
- CGCG 374-015, KPG 548A, IRAS F20447+0008, UGC 11628, PGC 65375, MCG +00-53-003

NGC 6962 is a large intermediate spiral galaxy located in the constellation of Aquarius. The redshift of the galaxy is (z) 0.014 and it was first discovered by the German-British astronomer by the name of William Herschel in 1785 who found it as a faint object with a round bright middle. This galaxy was also observed by the English polymath, John Herschel in 1827.

== Description ==
NGC 6962 is classified as a type SAB(r)ab spiral galaxy with a nucleus and ring structure. It has two main spiral arms on the outer side of the galaxy depicted as having a faint appearance based on both hydrogen-alpha (Hα) and ultraviolet imaging. The radio emission of the Hα is considered as patchy whereas the ultraviolet emission is much more regular. The star formation of the galaxy is estimated to be 0.96 ± 0.38 M_{☉} per year while the R-band magnitude is 22.48 ± 1.00. Evidence also found there is an absence of a peculiar dust lane in the galaxy and it has a weak bar feature. The nucleus of the galaxy is found as diffused and bright.

NGC 6962 is the brightest and also the largest member of the NGC 6962 galaxy group. The other members of the group include NGC 6959, NGC 6961, NGC 6964, NGC 6965, NGC 6967, PGC 65351, PGC 65356, PGC 1169059 and PGC 162626. One of the members (NGC 6964) is known to pair with it, but they are non-interacting.

Two supernovae have been found in NGC 6962. The first one was SN 2002ha and it was detected in October 2002 by astronomers from the University of Berkeley as part of the LOTOSS program at the Lick Observatory. This supernova was located by 6.9 arcseconds west and 29.4 arcseconds south from the galaxy, and subsequently classified as of Type Ia. The second was SN 2003dt and it was also detected by another group of astronomers at Lick Observatory in April 2003. Like SN 2002ha, it was also classified as a Type Ia supernova.
