= UGC 9799 =

Radio galaxy in the constellation Serpens

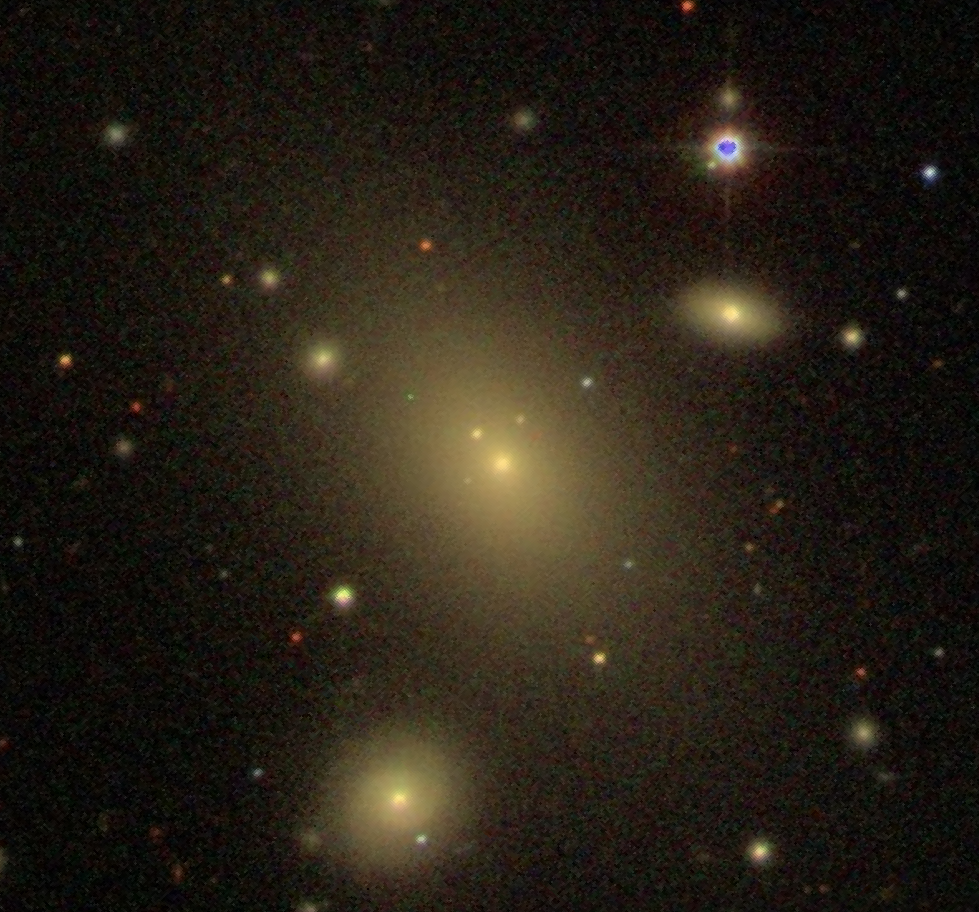
- The radio galaxy UGC 9799.

Observation data (J2000 epoch)
- Constellation: Serpens
- Right ascension: 15^{h} 16^{m} 44.50^{s}
- Declination: +07° 01′ 18.07″
- Redshift: 0.034547
- Heliocentric radial velocity: 10357 km/s
- Distance: 543 Mly
- Group or cluster: Abell 2052
- Apparent magnitude (V): 14.17

Characteristics
- Type: cD; E, Sy2, LEG
- Size: ~331,500 ly (101.65 kpc) (estimated)

Other designations
- 3C 317, 4C +07.40, CoNFIG 214, CGCG 049-090, CTA 067, DA 379, GIN 419, LHE 388, MCG +01-39-012, PKS 1514+07, PGC 54526

UGC 9799 also known as 3C 317, is a radio galaxy located in the constellation of Serpens. The redshift of the galaxy is (z) 0.034 estimating a light-travel time distance of 543 million light-years and it was first discovered as an astronomical radio source by astronomers in 1959. It is classified as a type-cD galaxy and is the brightest cluster galaxy of the cluster Abell 2052.

== Description ==
UGC 9799 is categorized as an elliptical galaxy with a slightly elongated appearance but its nucleus is unresolved. There is an ultraviolet filament present in the galaxy four kiloparsecs to the south from the nucleus region. This evidence suggests star formation activity is triggered by a galaxy merger of an nearby satellite galaxy. Imaging made by the Hubble Space Telescope (HST), found the core isophotes seem to be extending towards a dark band feature suggested to be a diffused dust lane. A secondary nucleus is likely present in UGC 9799.

The galaxy contains a radio source that has a steep radio spectrum. When observed with the Very Large Array (VLA), the structure is mainly irregular and its spectra index is mainly 0.8 below the frequencies of 200 MHz but gets much steeper upon reaching more than 750 MHz. A compact radio core is found at the center of the source; however there are no signs that the core is significantly variable. There is a large bipolar structure surrounding the core region, which in turn is enveloped inside a halo. There is also a loop structure linking together with its northern radio lobe and a plume feature. New observations at 4.9 GHz found the radio morphology is classified as S-shaped with two short jet features that have a bending angle of 5 milliarcseconds from the radio peak. At 8.3 GHz, these jets are shown to have an alignment to around -32°.

Studies published in 1995 and in 2017 have found the presence of globular clusters inside UGC 9799 based on imaging. Further evidence also found there are 46,000 clusters in total, making these the largest amount found so far. A supermassive black hole mass of 10^{8} M_{☉} has been estimated for the galaxy.
