= 3C 336 =

Quasar located in the constellation Hercules

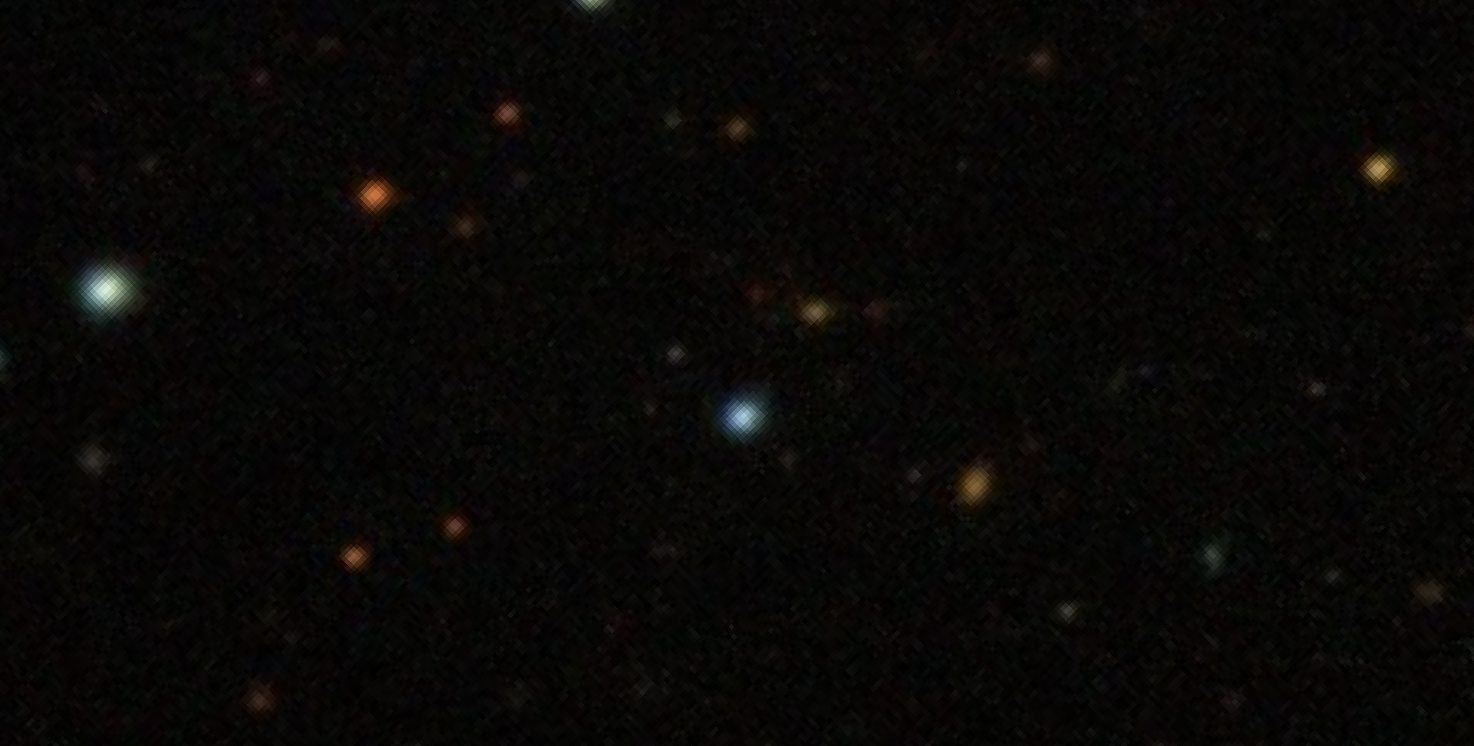
- The quasar 3C 336.

Observation data (J2000.0 epoch)
- Constellation: Hercules
- Right ascension: 16^{h} 24^{m} 39.094^{s}
- Declination: +23° 45′ 12.255″
- Redshift: 0.927154
- Heliocentric radial velocity: 277,954 km/s
- Distance: 7.222 Gly
- Apparent magnitude (V): 17.47

Characteristics
- Type: Opt.var. RLQ, Sy 1.2

Other designations
- 4C+23.43, PKS B1622+238, LEDA 2817683, OS +328, DA 410, NRAO 0501, TXS 1622+238, CoNFIG 248, SDSS J162439.08+234512.1

3C 336 is a powerful Fanaroff-Riley type 2 quasar located in the constellation of Hercules. It has a redshift of (z) 0.927 and was discovered in the Third Cambridge Catalogue of Radio Sources survey in 1962, with its radio source identified with a quasi-stellar object by 1965.

== Description ==
3C 336 is classified as a steep radio spectrum radio-loud quasar, located at the center of a rich galaxy cluster. The spectrum of this quasar displays six metal absorption lines located at various redshifts ranging from (z) 0.472, 0.797 and 0.891 and are identified with absorbing galaxies including an early-type spiral galaxy and a faint complex galaxy. A dampen Lyman-alpha absorber was identified towards the quasar with an H I column density of 2 × 10^{20} cm^{−2} located at (z) 0.656.

The radio structure of 3C 336 is complicated, classified as a double source that shows every component having a size less than 7 x 4 arcseconds and has no signs of interplanetary scintillations. A total intensity image shows the source is asymmetric with an extent of 28 milliarcseconds and has two radio lobes. A jet made up of a string of bright knots, is found heading southwest, where it links with a much compact component to an elongated and recessed feature located in its southern lobe. Although no counterjet is seen in 3C 336, there is a conspicuous knot on the path of its jet axis. This knot in turn, is then followed by hook of radio emission, curving in the direction of a bright extended part of the ridge located on the eastern side of the northern lobe. Towards the nucleus containing a core component measuring 12 Jansky in position angle of 200°, there is a clearly-resolved low-surface brightness extension.

High resolution observations made with Very Large Array and MERLIN of 3C 336, would find the radio emission originating from its lobes is extending backwards into its radio core and jet region. A compact hotspot feature is found in the southern part of the quasar's radio lobe. Based on observations, the flux density of the hotspot at both 1.53 and 4.89 GHz is 0.097 ± 0.015 and 0.045 ± 0.007 respectively, with an optical spectrum of 1.5 ± 1.0. When showed on 0.35 arcsecond resolution, the hotspot is further broken into two compact components which one is aligned with both jet and core, while the other is in an offset position.

3C 336 shows an emission-line region. When observed with both Hubble Space Telescope and ground-based imaging, the region is described asymmetric with a low-surface brightness structure northwest perpendicular to the radio axis, but later data suggests the emission is mainly restricted in the south region with a measured flux of 1.8 ± 0.5 × 10^{−16} erg cm^{−2} s^{−1}. Optical emission is found mainly extending 5 arcseconds north and by 3 arcseconds south from the quasar, with a detected velocity shear of 600 kilometers per seconds across the emission.

The star-formation in the host galaxy of 3C 336 is estimated to be 83.4^{+20.8}_{-27.8} based on a far-infrared fit parameter obtained in a sample of 3CR sources via Herschel Space Observatory. The total infrared luminosity is 4.8^{+1.2}_{-1.6} × 10^{11} L_{☉} and it has a supermassive black hole mass of 54.2^{+38.0}_{-23.5} × 10^{7} M_{☉}.
