= IERS B0125+487 =

Seyfert type 1 galaxy located in the constellation Andromeda

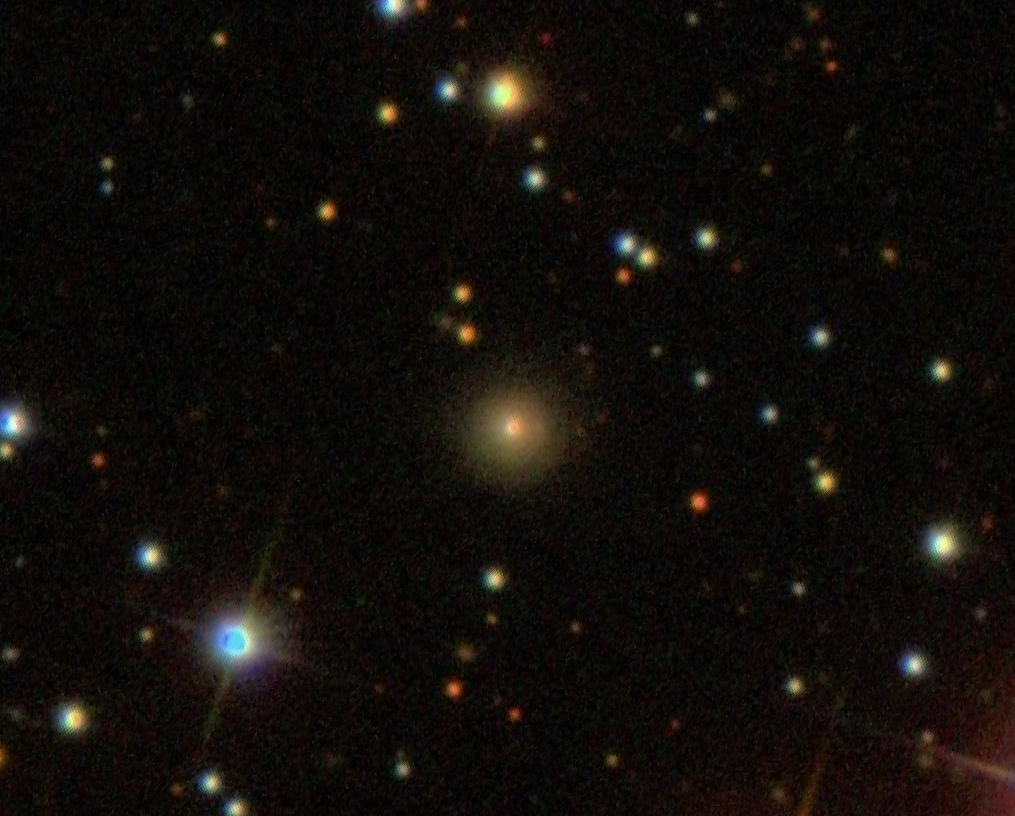
- SDSS image of IERS B0125+487.

Observation data (J2000 epoch)
- Constellation: Andromeda
- Right ascension: 01^{h} 28^{m} 08.06^{s}
- Declination: +49° 01′ 05.98″
- Redshift: 0.067000
- Heliocentric radial velocity: 20,086 km/s
- Distance: 911 Mly
- Apparent magnitude (V): 17.2

Characteristics
- Type: blazar
- Size: ~171,000 ly (52.3 kpc) (estimated)

Other designations
- 2MASX J01280804+4901056, LEDA 2331338, NVSS J012808+490106, OCARS 0125+487, PS1-13dgj

IERS B0125+487 is a Seyfert type 1 galaxy located in the constellation of Andromeda. The redshift of the object is (z) 0.067 and it was first discovered by astronomers in 1996 who found it containing hydrogen-alpha emission in its spectrum.

== Description ==
IERS B0125+487 contains a flat radio spectrum of low luminosity. When imaged with Very Long Baseline Array (VLBI) at 5 GHz, it displays a core-jet morphology. Radio imaging made with Very Large Array have showed the source to display weak radio emission found to be elongating in the same path like its parsec-scale structure, reaching around 5 arcseconds from its radio core.

A one-sided jet was found in the galaxy based on VLBI 5 GHz observations. Imaging of the jet at 1.6 GHz, have showed it reaching a distance of 100 milliarcseconds from the core in the same position angle of its inner jet. Evidence also showed the jet is also polarized, however the inner jet polarization is mainly offset when reaching towards the jet's southern edge.

The polarization levels in the galaxy is shown to be rising significantly. When it was studied in 1992, the polarization levels were reported to be around two percent. In 1996, the spectral of source was shown to have a clear polarization signature in the same position. However the polarization percentage increased to 12 percent, 10 times more compared to the previous observation in 1992. Astronomers also noted the polarization is also diluted at a Hydrogen-alpha line likely the result of some degree of polarization originating from a continuum process. This confirms the galaxy might have a non-thermal component within its optical continuum.

A study published in 2019 has shown the galaxy has evidence of interstellar scintillation on a 4-day timescale with a 15 GHz mean flux density of 0.556 and variability amplitude of 129.10° based on its ratio definition of the 4-day modulation index.
