= PKS 1519−273 =

BL Lacertae object in the constellation Libra

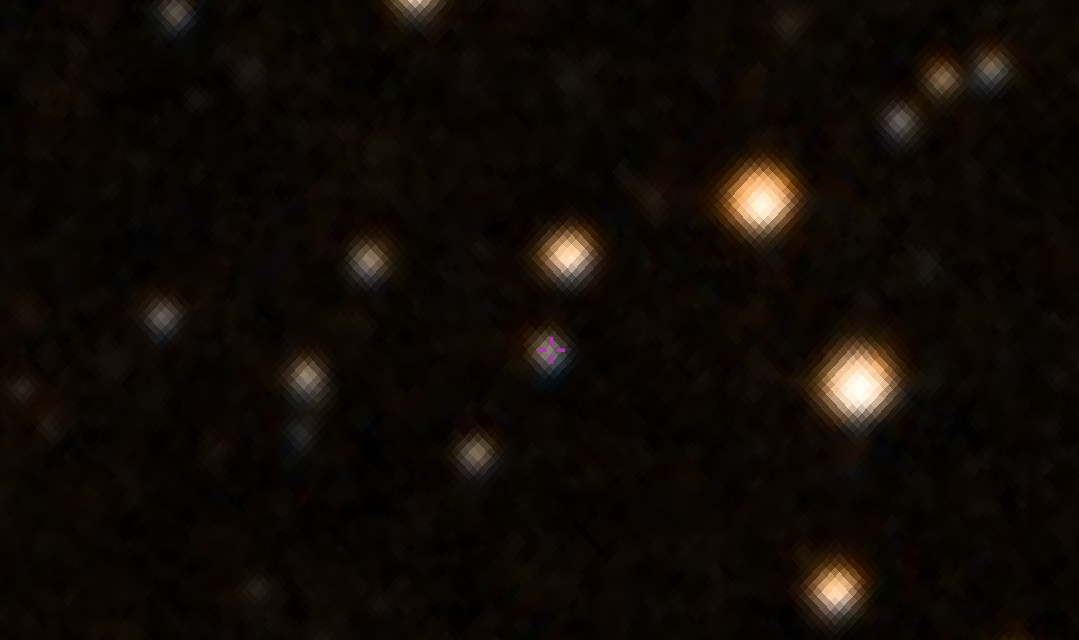
- The BL Lacertae object PKS 1519−273.

Observation data (J2000.0 epoch)
- Constellation: Libra
- Right ascension: 15^{h} 22^{m} 37.676^{s}
- Declination: −27° 30′ 10.786″
- Redshift: 1.297000
- Heliocentric radial velocity: 388,831 km/s
- Distance: 8.529 Gly
- Apparent magnitude (V): 18.5
- Apparent magnitude (B): 18.72

Characteristics
- Type: BLLAC

Other designations
- NVSS J152237−273010, 4FGL J1522.6−2730, IRCF J152237.6−273010, PKS J1522−2730

PKS 1519−273 is a BL Lacertae object located in the constellation of Libra. Its redshift is (z) 1.297 and was first discovered by the Very Large Array (VLA) as a strong extragalactic radio source in 1981 The radio spectrum of PKS 1519−273 is flat, leading to its classification as a flat-spectrum radio source.

== Description ==
PKS 1519−273 is an intraday variable source. It displays significant variations in both linear and circular polarization at centimeter wavelengths. When observed in August 2000, its circular polarization was found to differ between frequencies of 1.4 and 8.6 GHz on an hour-to-day timescale. According to scientists who studied it, the variability likely originated from interstellar scintillation of a compact source component containing about 3.8% of the circular polarization. Irregular variability was detected in PKS 1519−273 on hourly timescales, with the object showing flux changes at higher amplitudes of 8.6 and 4.8 GHz. These flux changes were subsequently accompanied by anticorrelated polarization variability.

The source of PKS 1519−273 is found to be compact. It has a slightly extended structure located in the west direction with an unresolved radio core based on Very Long Baseline Interferometry observations. It is estimated to have a flux density of 2.2 Jansky, a brightness temperature that is greater than 3.2 trillion Kelvin and an estimated size of 0.25 milliarcseconds.

PKS 1519−273 is classified as a blazar according to an optical polarimetry study conducted in 1988, with an inverted spectrum during flaring periods. Radio variability was also detected by the Australia Telescope Compact Array, with its mean flux density shifting between 1.8 and 2.2 Jansky. In October 2023, it showed gamma ray activity, which was detected by the Large Area Telescope.
