= 4C 31.04 =

Radio galaxy in the constellation of Pisces

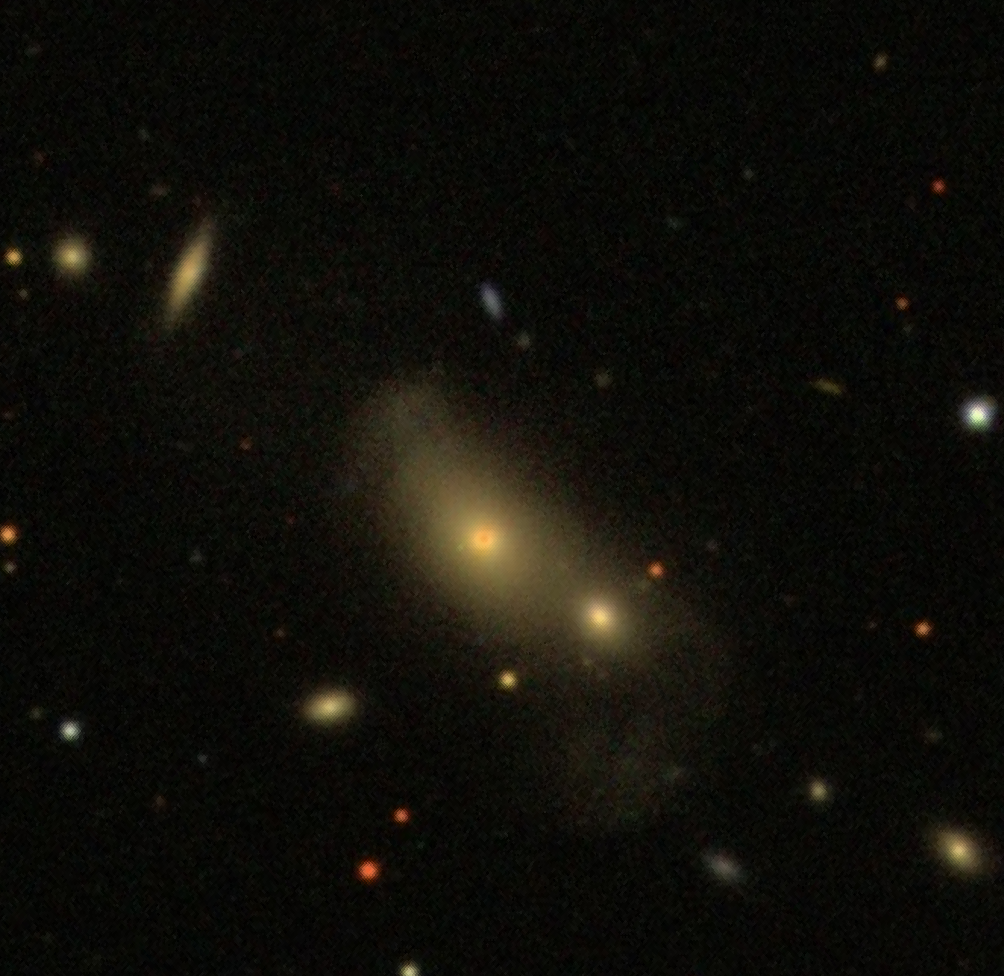
- The radio galaxy 4C 31.04.

Observation data (J2000.0 epoch)
- Constellation: Pisces
- Right ascension: 01^{h} 19^{m} 34.97^{s}
- Declination: +32° 10′ 49.83″
- Redshift: 0.059715
- Heliocentric radial velocity: 17,902 km/s
- Distance: 812 Mly
- Apparent magnitude (V): 14.5
- Apparent magnitude (B): 16

Characteristics
- Type: WLRG Sy2
- Size: ~335,000 ly (102.6 kpc) (estimated)

Other designations
- 2MASX J01193495+3210495, PGC 4773, MCG +05-04-018, DA 41, OHIO C 328, WK 40, JVAS J0119+3210

4C 31.04 known as MCG +05-04-018 or CGCG 502-027 NED02, is a radio galaxy located in the constellation of Pisces. The estimated redshift of the galaxy is (z) 0.060 and it was first discovered as an astronomical radio source in 1967 by astronomers who identified it to be associated with a close double pair of galaxies. The radio spectrum of the source is known to be both compact and steep, making it a compact steep spectrum (CSS) galaxy.

== Description ==
4C 31.04 is categorized as a compact symmetrical object (CSO). Its host galaxy is a large elliptical galaxy residing as the brightest member of a small galaxy cluster. The total star formation of the galaxy is estimated to be 4.9 M_{☉} per year with the star population estimated to be mainly dominated by old metal-rich stars. There is also a dust lane that cuts through the nuclear region of the galaxy based on Hubble Space Telescope imaging. A spiral galaxy companion is found located from the host galaxy by 20 kiloparsecs with a redshift of (z) 0.054.

The radio source of 4C 31.04 is known to be compact. When observed with Very Long Baseline Interferometry (VLBI), it is depicted as double with extended radio lobes that are different from one another. The eastern lobe is more compact and strong, whereas the western lobe is weak with a distorted structure. There is a faint bridge of radio emission between lobes when imaged at 1.7 GHz frequencies. Earlier VLBI observations on centi-arcsecond scales found the source is elongated at the position angle of 115°. A radio core is detected with an inverted spectrum. The total age of the source is estimated to be 550 years based on hot spot features shown moving at around (0.085 ± 0.016) milliarcseconds per year.

In 2007 a molecular disk was found based on evidence of strong detections of both HCO line emission and absorption molecules. The total gas mass of the disk is estimated to be 0.5 × 10^{10}–5 × 10^{10} M_{☉}.

A study published in 2024 found the lobes of the galaxy expand outwards into a circumnuclear disk region causing the turbulence of molecular gas. Further evidence also found there is a small part of the blueshifted wing against an eastern lobe region with the gas mainly depicted as having velocity dispersion that reaches up to 40 kilometers per seconds. Gas clumps are shown around the eastern lobe, indicating it is interacting together with the gas clouds and also powering H I outflows.
