= Okroy Cloud =

Intergalactic dust cloud in the constellation Virgo discovered in 1988

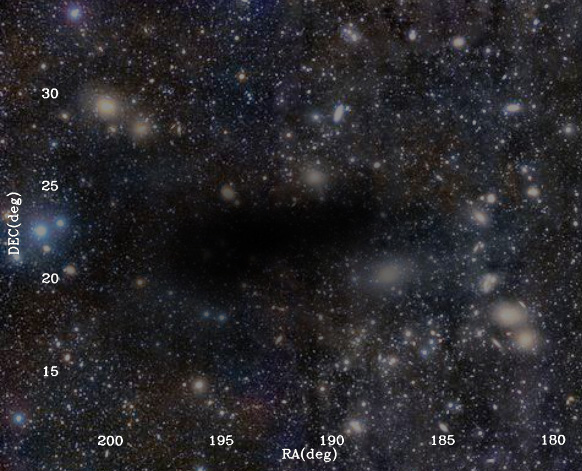

Observation data (J2000 epoch)
- Constellation: Virgo
- Right ascension: 12h 50m
- Declination: 22°
- Distance: ?
- Apparent magnitude (V): ?
- Absolute magnitude (V): ?

Characteristics
- Type: intergalactic dust cloud
- Apparent size (V): 30° × 10°

Other designations
- none

The Okroy Cloud is an intergalactic dust cloud near the Milky Way galaxy and is possibly a satellite of the galaxy due to its low velocity. It was discovered by the Polish astronomer Robert Okroy in 1965. Its intergalactic nature was first studied by Bogdan Wszolek and Solvia Massi in 1988.

== See also ==
- Local Group
- Satellite galaxies of the Milky Way
