= Solar wind =

Stream of charged particles from the Sun

Artist's impression of solar wind flow around Earth's magnetosphere

Solar wind observed by the Parker Solar Probe, 2018

The solar wind is a stream of charged particles released from the Sun's outermost atmospheric layer, the corona. This plasma mostly consists of electrons, protons and alpha particles with kinetic energy between 0.5 and 10 keV. The composition of the solar wind plasma also includes a mixture of particle species found in the solar plasma: trace amounts of heavy ions and atomic nuclei of elements such as carbon, nitrogen, oxygen, neon, magnesium, silicon, sulfur, and iron. There are also rarer traces of some other nuclei and isotopes such as phosphorus, titanium, chromium, and nickel's isotopes ^{58}Ni, ^{60}Ni, and ^{62}Ni. Superimposed with the solar-wind plasma is the interplanetary magnetic field. The solar wind varies in density, temperature and speed over time and over solar latitude and longitude. Its particles can escape the Sun's gravity because of their high energy resulting from the high temperature of the corona, which in turn is a result of the coronal magnetic field. The boundary separating the corona from the solar wind is called the Alfvén surface.

At a distance of more than a few solar radii from the Sun, the solar wind reaches speeds of 250–750 km/s and is supersonic, meaning it moves faster than the speed of fast magnetosonic waves. The flow of the solar wind is no longer supersonic at the termination shock. Other related phenomena include the aurora (northern and southern lights), comet tails that always point away from the Sun, and geomagnetic storms that can change the direction of magnetic field lines.

== History ==
=== Observations from Earth ===
Although the timeline begins in 1610 with Johannes Kepler's letter to Galileo, where solar winds are referred to as a "heavenly breeze", pushing comets out into space, the existence of particles flowing outward from the Sun to the Earth was first formally suggested by British astronomer Richard C. Carrington. In 1859, Carrington and Richard Hodgson independently made the first observations of what would later be called a solar flare. This is a sudden, localised increase in brightness on the solar disc, which is now known to often occur in conjunction with an episodic ejection of material and magnetic flux from the Sun's atmosphere, known as a coronal mass ejection. The following day, a powerful geomagnetic storm was observed, and Carrington suspected that there might be a connection; the geomagnetic storm is now attributed to the arrival of the coronal mass ejection in near-Earth space and its subsequent interaction with the Earth's magnetosphere. Irish academic George FitzGerald later suggested that matter was being regularly accelerated away from the Sun, reaching the Earth after several days.

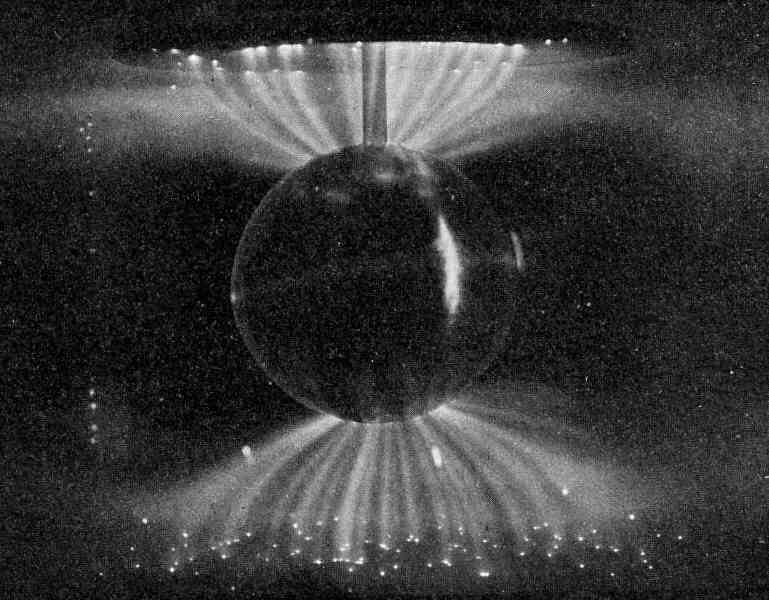
Laboratory simulation of the magnetosphere's influence on the solar wind; these aurora-like Birkeland currents were created in a terrella, a magnetised anode globe in an evacuated chamber.

In 1910, British astrophysicist Arthur Eddington essentially suggested the existence of the solar wind, without naming it, in a footnote to an article on Comet Morehouse. Eddington's proposition was never fully embraced, even though he had also made a similar suggestion at a Royal Institution address the previous year, in which he had postulated that the ejected material consisted of electrons, whereas in his study of Comet Morehouse he had supposed them to be ions.

The idea that the ejected material consisted of both ions and electrons was first suggested by Norwegian scientist Kristian Birkeland. His geomagnetic surveys showed that auroral activity was almost uninterrupted. As these displays and other geomagnetic activity were being produced by particles from the Sun, he concluded that the Earth was being continually bombarded by "rays of electric corpuscles emitted by the Sun". He proposed in 1916 that, "From a physical point of view it is most probable that solar rays are neither exclusively negative nor positive rays, but of both kinds"; in other words, the solar wind consists of both negative electrons and positive ions. Three years later, in 1919, British physicist Frederick Lindemann also suggested that the Sun ejects particles of both polarities: protons as well as electrons.

Around the 1930s, scientists had concluded that the temperature of the solar corona must be a million degrees Celsius because of the way it extended into space (as seen during a total solar eclipse). Later spectroscopic work confirmed this extraordinary temperature to be the case. In the mid-1950s, British mathematician Sydney Chapman calculated the properties of a gas at such a temperature and determined that the corona being such a superb conductor of heat, it must extend way out into space, beyond the orbit of Earth. Also in the 1950s, German astronomer Ludwig Biermann became interested in the fact that the tail of a comet always points away from the Sun, regardless of the direction in which the comet is travelling. Biermann postulated that this happens because the Sun emits a steady stream of particles that pushes the comet's tail away. German astronomer Paul Ahnert is credited (by Wilfried Schröder) as being the first to relate solar wind to the direction of a comet's tail based on observations of the comet Whipple–Fedke (1942g).

=== Theoretical prediction ===
In 1956, Biermann came to the University of Chicago, where he discussed his results with the astrophysicist Eugene Parker. Parker also discussed the solar corona with mathematician Sydney Chapman, who mentioned that "the corona is so hot that it should extend clear to the orbit of the Earth". Parker then conjectured that "the corona and solar corpuscular radiation must be the same thing": Parker himself said that the math needed for the solar wind discovery was just "four lines of algebra".

I called it the solar wind because I felt that solar corpuscular radiation gives the wrong idea. With that term, one thinks of individual particles being shot out, which was the original picture we had. But it really is an ordinary flow of gas.

The math needed to discover the solar wind was, per Parker just "four lines of algebra". Parker proposed that although the Sun's corona is strongly attracted by solar gravity, it is such a good conductor of heat that it is still very hot at large distances from the Sun. As solar gravity weakens with increasing distance from the Sun, the hydrodynamic effect is identical to a de Laval nozzle, inciting a transition from subsonic to supersonic flow. When Parker wrote hydrodynamic equations for an isothermal, extended coronal atmosphere, the plasma flow velocity integrated to a closed form:
$$\left[\frac{v^2}{v_m^2} - \ln\left(\frac{v^2}{v_m^2}\right)\right] = 4\ln\left(\frac{r}{a}\right) + \left(\frac{v_{\text{esc}}^2}{v_m^2}\right)\left(\frac{a}{r}\right) - 4\ln\left(\frac{v_{\text{esc}}^2}{v_m^2}\right) - 3 + \ln 256$$
One solution to this equation was immediately recognizable as a solar wind.

Parker's theory of supersonic solar wind also predicted the shape of the solar magnetic field in the outer Solar System. Parker argued that a million-degree corona cannot remain static: pressure forces must drive a radially expanding flow that accelerates from subsonic near the Sun to supersonic beyond a critical point. He further noted that solar rotation winds outward-advected magnetic field lines into a spiral pattern in the ecliptic, now called the Parker spiral.

His theoretical modeling was not immediately accepted by the astronomical community: when Parker submitted the results to The Astrophysical Journal in 1958, two reviewers recommended its rejection. One reviewer commented on the paper: "Well I would suggest that Parker go to the library and read up on the subject before he tries to write a paper about it, because this is utter nonsense." The editor of the journal and Parker's colleague at the University of Chicago, future Nobel prize-winner Subrahmanyan Chandrasekhar, finding no obvious errors in the paper, overruled the reviewers and published the paper, even though he disagreed with Parker's theory.

A colleague at the University of Chicago, Joseph W. Chamberlain, who published a paper in 1960 showing that the plasma flow velocity equation also admitted a solution with an exponential decay in flow velocity away from the sun. Chamberlain's subsonic solution was called the "solar breeze", and Italian plasma physicist Marco Velli later showed that "the breeze solution is unstable" to low frequency perturbations.

=== Observations from space ===
Suspected sources of solar wind: coronal holes, active regions, and coronal streamers

Parker's theoretical predictions were confirmed by satellite observations; it is called to be "a unique example in astrophysics, due to its immediate and brief confirmation by observations".

In January 1959, the Soviet spacecraft Luna 1 first directly observed the solar wind and measured its strength, using hemispherical ion traps. The discovery, made by Konstantin Gringauz, was verified by Luna 2, Luna 3, and the more distant measurements of Venera 1. Three years later, a similar measurement was performed by American geophysicist Marcia Neugebauer and collaborators using the Mariner 2 spacecraft. Mariner 2 data revealed two types of solar wind, a low- and a high-speed component.

The first numerical simulation of the solar wind in the solar corona, including closed and open field lines, was performed by Pneuman and Kopp in 1971. The magnetohydrodynamics equations in steady state were solved iteratively starting with an initial dipolar configuration.

In 1990, the Ulysses probe was launched to study the solar wind from high solar latitudes. All prior observations had been made at or near the Solar System's ecliptic plane.

In the late 1990s, the Ultraviolet Coronal Spectrometer (UVCS) instrument on board the SOHO spacecraft observed the acceleration region of the fast solar wind emanating from the poles of the Sun and found that the wind accelerates much faster than can be accounted for by thermodynamic expansion alone. Parker's model predicted that the wind should make the transition to supersonic flow at an altitude of about four solar radii (approx. 3,000,000 km) from the photosphere (surface); but the transition (or "sonic point") now appears to be much lower, perhaps only one solar radius (approx. 700,000 km) above the photosphere, suggesting that some additional mechanism accelerates the solar wind away from the Sun. The acceleration of the fast wind is still not understood and cannot be fully explained by Parker's theory. However, the gravitational and electromagnetic explanation for this acceleration is detailed in an earlier paper by 1970 Nobel laureate in Physics, Hannes Alfvén.

From May 10 to May 12, 1999, NASA's Advanced Composition Explorer (ACE) and WIND spacecraft observed a 98% decrease of solar wind density. This allowed energetic electrons from the Sun to flow to Earth in narrow beams known as "strahl", which caused a highly unusual "polar rain" event, in which a visible aurora appeared over the North Pole. In addition, Earth's magnetosphere increased to between 5 and 6 times its normal size.

The STEREO mission was launched in 2006 to study coronal mass ejections and the solar corona, using stereoscopy from two widely separated imaging systems. Each STEREO spacecraft carried two heliospheric imagers: highly sensitive wide-field cameras capable of imaging the solar wind itself, via Thomson scattering of sunlight off of free electrons. Movies from STEREO revealed the solar wind near the ecliptic, as a large-scale turbulent flow.

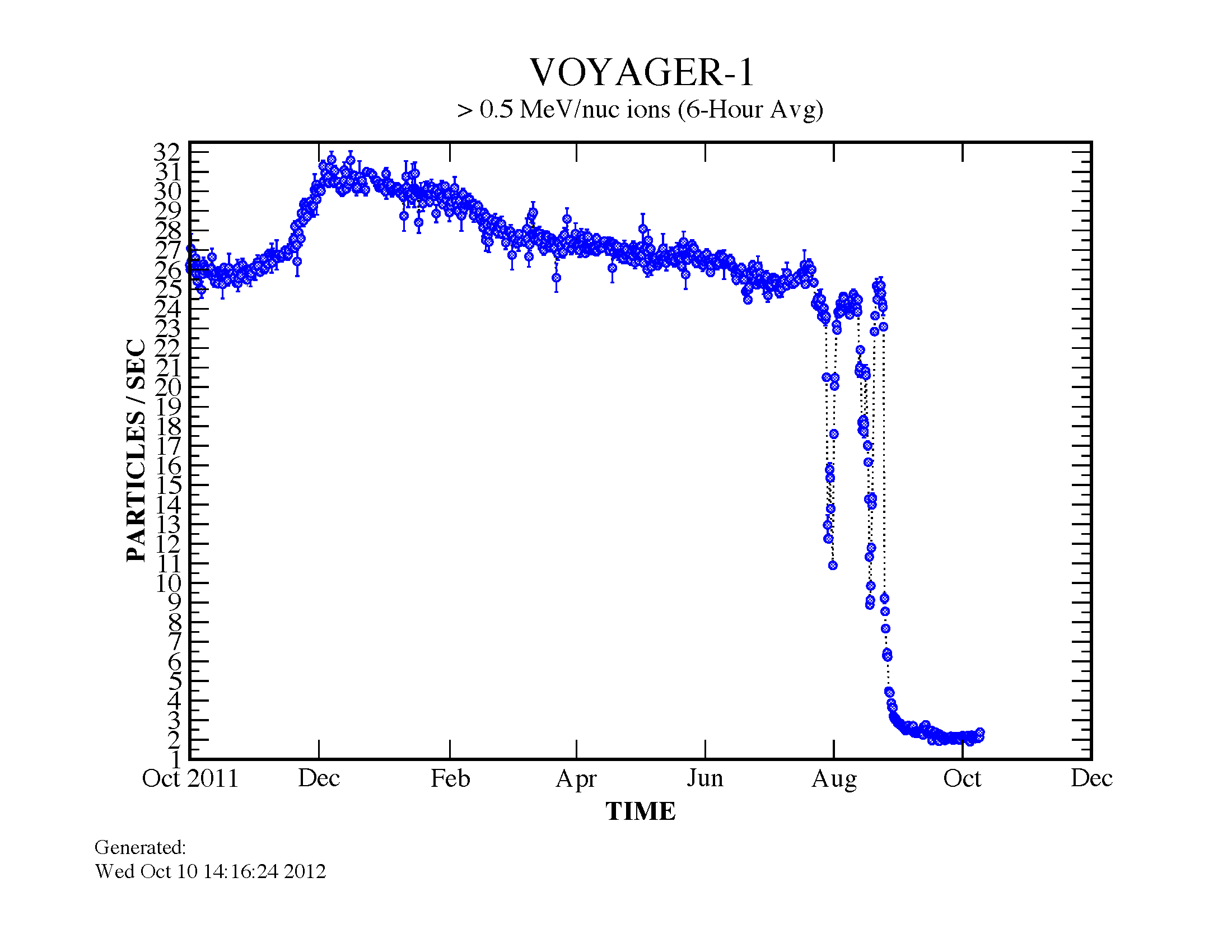
Plot showing a dramatic decrease in the rate of solar wind particle detection by Voyager 1

On December 13, 2010, Voyager 1 determined that the velocity of the solar wind, at its location 10.8 billion miles (17.4 billion kilometres) from Earth had slowed to zero. "We have gotten to the point where the wind from the Sun, which until now has always had an outward motion, is no longer moving outward; it is only moving sideways so that it can end up going down the tail of the heliosphere, which is a comet-shaped-like object", said Voyager project scientist Edward Stone.

In 2018, NASA launched the Parker Solar Probe, named in honor of American astrophysicist Eugene Parker, on a mission to study the structure and dynamics of the solar corona, in an attempt to understand the mechanisms that cause particles to be heated and accelerated as solar wind. During its seven-year mission, the probe will make twenty-four orbits of the Sun, passing further into the corona with each orbit's perihelion, ultimately passing within 0.04 astronomical units of the Sun's surface. It is the first NASA spacecraft named for a living person, and Parker, at age 91, was on hand to observe the launch.

In February 2020, another solar orbiter was launched from Cape Canaveral. Orbiting 24 degrees above the elliptic plane, the project has been able to collect first ever images of the sun's north and south poles. With its mission to collect data on solar storm patterns, solar, and magnetic fields, the project is estimated to take roughly 10 years approaching the sun's surface within 42 million km.

== Acceleration mechanism ==
While early models of the solar wind relied primarily on thermal energy to accelerate the material, by the 1960s it was clear that thermal acceleration alone cannot account for the high speed of solar wind. An additional unknown acceleration mechanism is required and likely relates to magnetic fields in the solar atmosphere.

The Sun's corona, or extended outer layer, is a region of plasma that is heated to over a megakelvin. As a result of thermal collisions, the particles within the inner corona have a range and distribution of speeds described by a Maxwellian distribution. The mean velocity of these particles is about 145 km/s, which is well below the solar escape velocity of 618 km/s. However, a few of the particles achieve energies sufficient to reach the terminal velocity of 400 km/s, which allows them to feed the solar wind. At the same temperature, electrons, due to their much smaller mass, reach escape velocity and build up an electric field that further accelerates ions away from the Sun.

The total number of particles carried away from the Sun by the solar wind is about 1.3×10^{36} per second. Thus, the total mass loss each year is about (2–3)×10^{−14} solar masses, or about 1.3–1.9 million tonnes per second. This is equivalent to losing a mass equal to the Earth every 150 million years. However, since the Sun's formation, only about 0.01% of its initial mass has been lost through the solar wind. Other stars have much stronger stellar winds that result in significantly higher mass-loss rates.

=== Jetlets ===
In March 2023 solar extreme ultraviolet observations have shown that small-scale magnetic reconnection could be a driver of the solar wind as a swarm of nanoflares in the form omnipresent jetting activity a.k.a. jetlets producing short-lived streams of hot plasma and Alfvén waves at the base of the solar corona. This activity could also be connected to the magnetic switchback phenomenon of the solar wind.

== Properties and structure ==
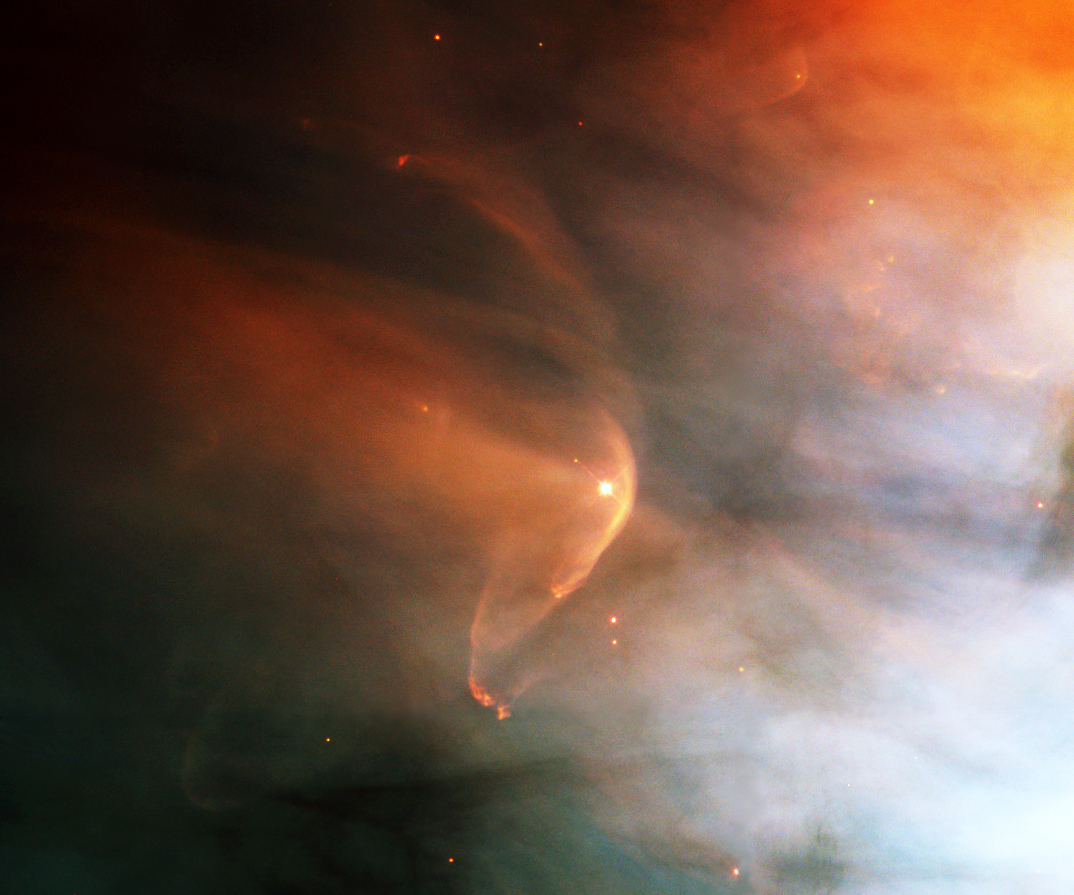
This is thought to show the solar wind from the star L.L. Orionis generating a bow shock (the bright arc).

=== Fast and slow solar wind ===
The solar wind is observed to exist in two fundamental states, termed the slow solar wind and the fast solar wind, though their differences extend well beyond their speeds. In near-Earth space, the slow solar wind is observed to have a velocity of 300–500 km/s, a temperature of ~100 kilokelvin and a composition that is a close match to the corona. By contrast, the fast solar wind has a typical velocity of 750 km/s, a temperature of 800 kilokelvin and it nearly matches the composition of the Sun's photosphere. The slow solar wind is twice as dense and more variable in nature than the fast solar wind.

The slow solar wind appears to originate from a region around the Sun's equatorial belt that is known as the "streamer belt", where coronal streamers are produced by magnetic flux open to the heliosphere draping over closed magnetic loops. The exact coronal structures involved in slow solar wind formation and the method by which the material is released is still under debate. Observations of the Sun between 1996 and 2001 showed that emission of the slow solar wind occurred at latitudes up to 30–35° during the solar minimum (the period of lowest solar activity), then expanded toward the poles as the solar cycle approached maximum. At solar maximum, the poles were also emitting a slow solar wind.

The fast solar wind originates from coronal holes, which are funnel-like regions of open field lines in the Sun's magnetic field. Such open lines are particularly prevalent around the Sun's magnetic poles. The plasma source is small magnetic fields created by convection cells in the solar atmosphere. These fields confine the plasma and transport it into the narrow necks of the coronal funnels, which are located only 20,000 km above the photosphere. The plasma is released into the funnel when these magnetic field lines reconnect.

=== Velocity and density ===
Near the Earth's orbit at 1 astronomical unit (AU) the plasma flows at speeds ranging from 250 to 750 km/s with a density ranging between 3 and 10 particles per cubic centimeter and temperature ranging from 10^{4} to 10^{6} kelvin.

On average, the plasma density decreases with the square of the distance from the Sun (an example of the inverse-square law), while the velocity decreases and flattens out at 1 AU.

Voyager 1 and Voyager 2 reported plasma density n between 0.001 and 0.005 particles/cm^{3} at distances of 80 to 120 AU, increasing rapidly beyond 120 AU at heliopause to between 0.05 and 0.2 particles/cm^{3}.

=== Pressure ===
At 1 AU, the wind exerts a pressure typically in the range of 1–6 nPa ((1–6)×10^{−9} N/m^{2}), although it can readily vary outside that range.

The ram pressure is a function of wind speed and density. The formula is

$$P = m_\text{p} \cdot n \cdot V^2 = \mathrm{1.6726 \times 10^{-27} \, kg} \cdot n \cdot V^2$$

where m_{p} is the proton mass, pressure P is in Pa (pascals), n is the density in particles/cm^{3} and V is the speed in km/s of the solar wind.

=== Coronal mass ejection ===
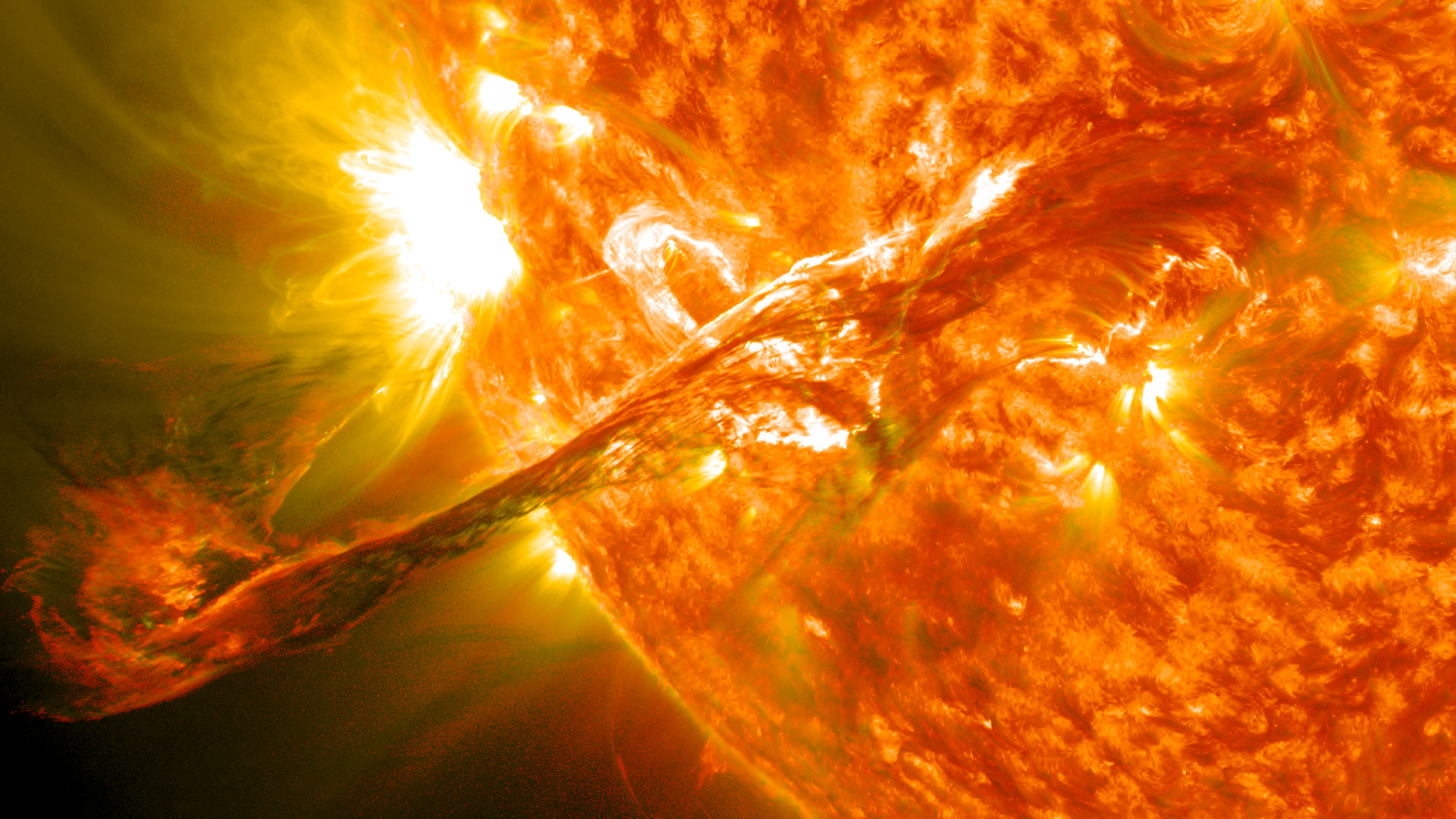
CME erupts from the Sun

Both the fast and slow solar wind can be interrupted by large, fast-moving bursts of plasma called coronal mass ejections, or CMEs. CMEs are caused by a release of magnetic energy at the Sun. CMEs are often called "solar storms" or "space storms" in the popular media. They are sometimes, but not always, associated with solar flares, which are another manifestation of magnetic energy release at the Sun. CMEs cause shock waves in the thin plasma of the heliosphere, launching electromagnetic waves and accelerating particles (mostly protons and electrons) to form showers of ionizing radiation that precede the CME.

When a CME impacts the Earth's magnetosphere, it temporarily deforms the Earth's magnetic field, changing the direction of compass needles and inducing large electrical ground currents in Earth itself; this is called a geomagnetic storm and it is a global phenomenon. CME impacts can induce magnetic reconnection in Earth's magnetotail (the midnight side of the magnetosphere); this launches protons and electrons downward toward Earth's atmosphere, where they form the aurora.

CMEs are not the only cause of space weather. Different patches on the Sun are known to give rise to slightly different speeds and densities of wind depending on local conditions. In isolation, each of these different wind streams would form a spiral with a slightly different angle, with fast-moving streams moving out more directly and slow-moving streams wrapping more around the Sun. Fast-moving streams tend to overtake slower streams that originate westward of them on the Sun, forming turbulent co-rotating interaction regions that give rise to wave motions and accelerated particles, and that affect Earth's magnetosphere in the same way as, but more gently than, CMEs.

CMEs have a complex internal structure, with a highly turbulent region of hot and compressed plasma (known as sheath) preceding an arrival of relatively cold and strongly magnetized plasma region (known as magnetic cloud or ejecta). Sheath and ejecta have very different impact on the Earth's magnetosphere and on various space weather phenomena, such as the behavior of Van Allen radiation belts.

=== Magnetic switchbacks ===
Parker Solar Probe observed switchbacks — traveling disturbances in the solar wind that caused the magnetic field to bend back on itself.

Magnetic switchbacks are sudden reversals in the magnetic field of the solar wind. They can also be described as traveling disturbances in the solar wind that caused the magnetic field to bend back on itself. They were first observed by the NASA–ESA mission Ulysses, the first spacecraft to fly over the Sun's poles. Parker Solar Probe observed first switchbacks in 2018.

== Solar System effects ==
Over the Sun's lifetime, the interaction of its surface layers with the escaping solar wind has significantly decreased its surface rotation rate. The wind is considered responsible for comets' tails, along with the Sun's radiation. The solar wind contributes to fluctuations in celestial radio waves observed on the Earth, through an effect called interplanetary scintillation.

=== Magnetospheres ===
Schematic of Earth's magnetosphere. The solar wind flows from left to right.

Where the solar wind intersects with a planet that has a well-developed magnetic field (such as Earth, Jupiter or Saturn), the particles are deflected by the Lorentz force. This region, known as the magnetosphere, causes the particles to travel around the planet rather than bombarding the atmosphere or surface. The magnetosphere is roughly shaped like a hemisphere on the side facing the Sun, then is drawn out in a long wake on the opposite side. The boundary of this region is called the magnetopause, and some of the particles are able to penetrate the magnetosphere through this region by partial reconnection of the magnetic field lines.

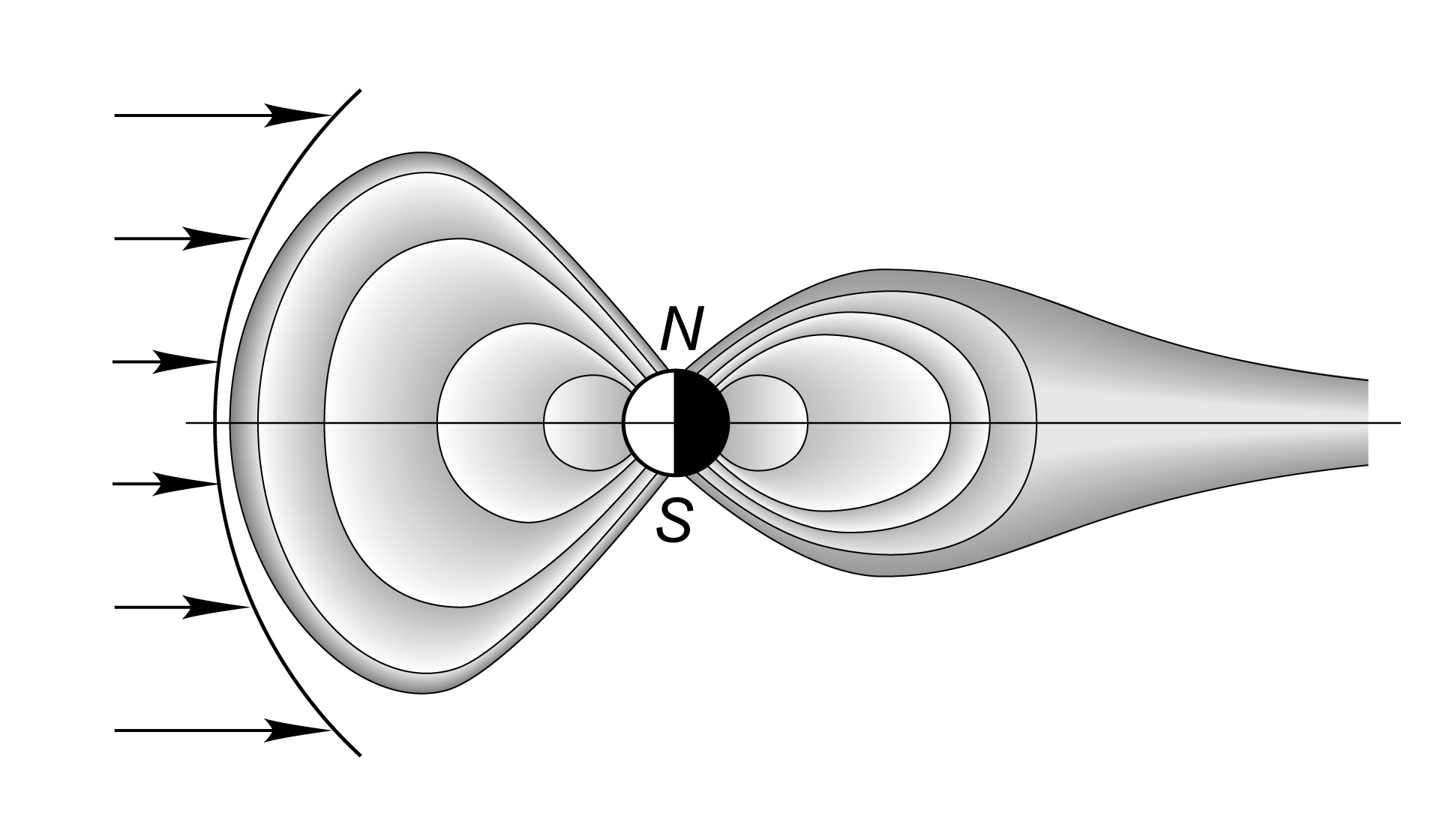
Noon meridian section of magnetosphere

The solar wind is responsible for the overall shape of Earth's magnetosphere. Fluctuations in its speed, density, direction, and entrained magnetic field strongly affect Earth's local space environment. For example, the levels of ionizing radiation and radio interference can vary by factors of hundreds to thousands; and the shape and location of the magnetopause and bow shock wave upstream of it can change by several Earth radii, exposing geosynchronous satellites to the direct solar wind. These phenomena are collectively called space weather.

From the European Space Agency's Cluster mission, a new study has taken place that proposes that it is easier for the solar wind to infiltrate the magnetosphere than previously believed. A group of scientists directly observed the existence of certain waves in the solar wind that were not expected. A recent study shows that these waves enable incoming charged particles of solar wind to breach the magnetopause. This suggests that the magnetic bubble forms more as a filter than a continuous barrier. This latest discovery occurred through the distinctive arrangement of the four identical Cluster spacecraft, which fly in a controlled configuration through near-Earth space. As they sweep from the magnetosphere into interplanetary space and back again, the fleet provides exceptional three-dimensional insights on the phenomena that connect the sun to Earth.

The research characterised variances in formation of the interplanetary magnetic field (IMF) largely influenced by Kelvin–Helmholtz instability (which occur at the interface of two fluids) as a result of differences in thickness and numerous other characteristics of the boundary layer. Experts believe that this was the first occasion that the appearance of Kelvin–Helmholtz waves at the magnetopause had been displayed at high latitude downward orientation of the IMF. These waves are being seen in unforeseen places under solar wind conditions that were formerly believed to be undesired for their generation. These discoveries show how Earth's magnetosphere can be penetrated by solar particles under specific IMF circumstances. The findings are also relevant to studies of magnetospheric progressions around other planetary bodies. This study suggests that Kelvin–Helmholtz waves can be a somewhat common, and possibly constant, instrument for the entrance of solar wind into terrestrial magnetospheres under various IMF orientations.

=== Atmospheres ===
The solar wind affects other incoming cosmic rays interacting with planetary atmospheres. Moreover, planets with a weak or non-existent magnetosphere are subject to atmospheric stripping by the solar wind.

Venus, the nearest and most similar planet to Earth, has 100 times denser atmosphere, with little or no geo-magnetic field. Space probes discovered a comet-like tail that extends to Earth's orbit.

Earth itself is largely protected from the solar wind by its magnetic field, which deflects most of the charged particles; however, some of the charged particles are trapped in the Van Allen radiation belt. A smaller number of particles from the solar wind manage to travel, as though on an electromagnetic energy transmission line, to the Earth's upper atmosphere and ionosphere in the auroral zones. The only time the solar wind is observable on the Earth is when it is strong enough to produce phenomena such as the aurora and geomagnetic storms. Bright auroras strongly heat the ionosphere, causing its plasma to expand into the magnetosphere, increasing the size of the plasma geosphere and injecting atmospheric matter into the solar wind. Geomagnetic storms result when the pressure of plasmas contained inside the magnetosphere is sufficiently large to inflate and thereby distort the geomagnetic field.

Although Mars is larger than Mercury and four times farther from the Sun, it is thought that the solar wind has stripped away up to a third of its original atmosphere, leaving a layer 1/100 as dense as the Earth's. It is believed the mechanism for this atmospheric stripping is gas caught in bubbles of the magnetic field, which are ripped off by the solar wind. In 2015 the NASA Mars Atmosphere and Volatile Evolution (MAVEN) mission measured the rate of atmospheric stripping caused by the magnetic field carried by the solar wind as it flows past Mars, which generates an electric field, much as a turbine on Earth can be used to generate electricity. This electric field accelerates electrically charged gas atoms, called ions, in Mars's upper atmosphere and shoots them into space. The MAVEN mission measured the rate of atmospheric stripping at about 100 grams (≈1/4 lb) per second.

=== Moons and planetary surfaces ===
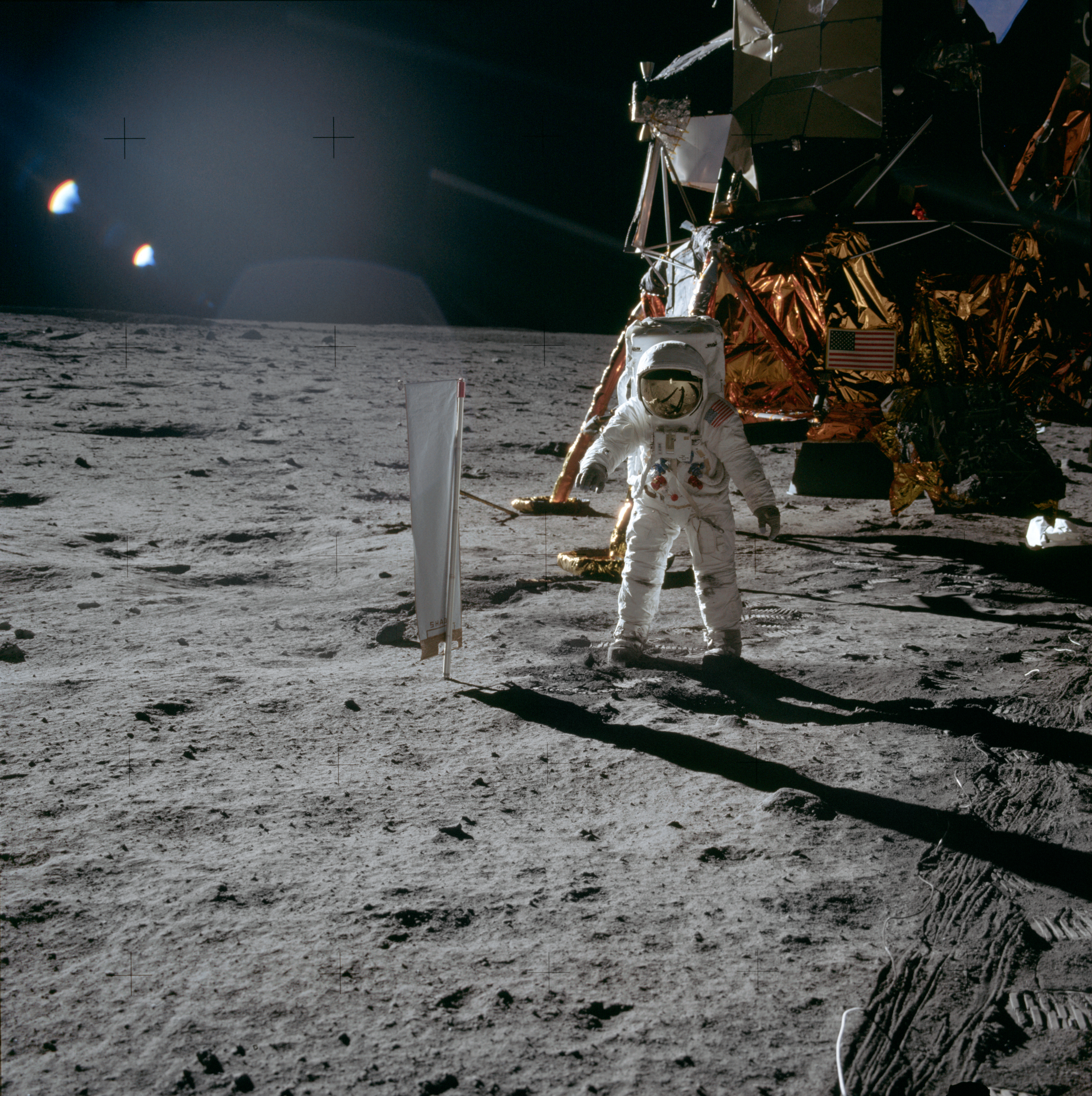
Apollo's SWC experiment

Mercury, the nearest planet to the Sun, bears the full brunt of the solar wind, and since its atmosphere is vestigial and transient, its surface is bathed in radiation.

Mercury has an intrinsic magnetic field, so under normal solar wind conditions, the solar wind cannot penetrate its magnetosphere and particles only reach the surface in the cusp regions. During coronal mass ejections, however, the magnetopause may get pressed into the surface of the planet, and under these conditions, the solar wind may interact freely with the planetary surface.

The Earth's Moon has no atmosphere or intrinsic magnetic field, and consequently its surface is bombarded with the full solar wind. The Project Apollo missions deployed passive aluminum collectors in an attempt to sample the solar wind, and lunar soil returned for study confirmed that the lunar regolith is enriched in atomic nuclei deposited from the solar wind. These elements may prove useful resources for future lunar expeditions.

== Limits ==
=== Alfvén surface ===
NASA animation of the Parker Solar Probe passing through the Sun's corona. Inside the corona's boundary, its Alfvén surface, plasma waves travel back and forth to the Sun's surface.

The Alfvén surface is the boundary separating the corona from the solar wind defined as where the coronal plasma's Alfvén speed and the large-scale solar wind speed are equal.

Researchers were unsure exactly where the Alfvén critical surface of the Sun lay. Based on remote images of the corona, estimates had put it somewhere between 10 and 20 solar radii from the surface of the Sun. On April 28, 2021, during its eighth flyby of the Sun, NASA's Parker Solar Probe encountered the specific magnetic and particle conditions at 18.8 solar radii that indicated that it penetrated the Alfvén surface.

=== Outer limits ===
The solar wind "blows a bubble" in the interstellar medium (the rarefied hydrogen and helium gas that permeates the galaxy). The point where the solar wind's strength is no longer great enough to push back the interstellar medium is known as the heliopause and is often considered to be the outer border of the Solar System. The distance to the heliopause is not precisely known and probably depends on the current velocity of the solar wind and the local density of the interstellar medium, but it is far outside Pluto's orbit. Scientists hope to gain perspective on the heliopause from data acquired through the Interstellar Boundary Explorer (IBEX) mission, launched in October 2008.

The heliopause is noted as one of the ways of defining the extent of the Solar System, along with the Kuiper Belt and the radius at which the Sun's gravitational influence is matched by other stars. The maximum extent of that influence has been estimated at between 50,000 astronomical units (7,500 billion kilometres; 0.79 light-years) and 2 light-years (130,000 au), compared to the heliopause (the outer boundary of the heliosphere), which has been detected at about 120 au (18,000 million km) by the Voyager 1 spacecraft.

The Voyager 2 spacecraft crossed the termination shock more than five times between August 30 and December 10, 2007. Voyager 2 crossed the shock about a billion kilometers closer to the Sun than the 13.5 billion km (90 au) distance where Voyager 1 came upon the termination shock. The spacecraft moved outward through the termination shock into the heliosheath and onward toward the interstellar medium.

== See also ==
- Active region
- Deep Space Climate Observatory
- Dyson–Harrop satellite
- Electric sail
- Heliospheric current sheet
- Helium focusing cone
- Interplanetary medium
- Magnetic sail
- Parker Solar Probe
- Plasmasphere
- Solar cycle
- Solar sail
- Solar Wind Composition Experiment
- STEREO
