= Interplanetary magnetic field =

Magnetic field within the Solar System

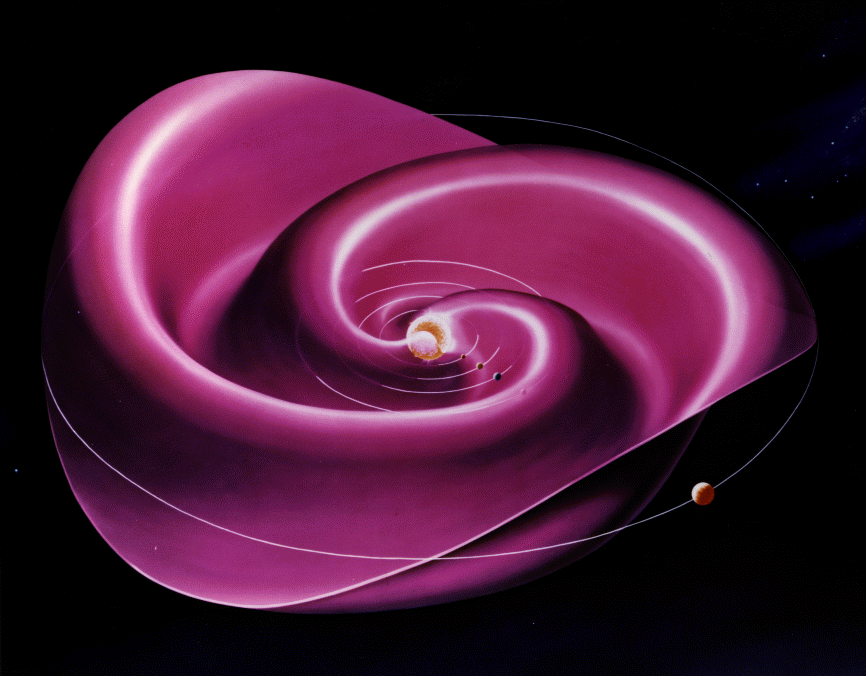
The heliospheric current sheet is a three-dimensional form of a Parker spiral that results from the influence of the Sun's rotating magnetic field on the plasma in the interplanetary medium.

The interplanetary magnetic field (IMF), also commonly referred to as the heliospheric magnetic field (HMF), is the component of the solar magnetic field that is dragged out from the solar corona by the solar wind flow to fill the Solar System.

== Coronal and solar wind plasma ==
The coronal and solar wind plasmas are highly electrically conductive, meaning the magnetic field lines and the plasma flows are effectively "frozen" together and the magnetic field cannot diffuse through the plasma on time scales of interest. In the solar corona, the magnetic pressure greatly exceeds the plasma pressure and thus the plasma is primarily structured and confined by the magnetic field. However, with increasing altitude through the corona, the solar wind accelerates as it extracts energy from the magnetic field through the Lorentz force interaction, resulting in the flow momentum exceeding the restraining magnetic tension force and the coronal magnetic field is dragged out by the solar wind to form the IMF. This acceleration often leads the IMF to be locally supersonic up to 160 AU away from the sun.

The dynamic pressure of the wind dominates over the magnetic pressure through most of the Solar System (or heliosphere), so that the magnetic field is pulled into an Archimedean spiral pattern (the Parker spiral) by the combination of the outward motion and the Sun's rotation. In near-Earth space, the IMF nominally makes an angle of approximately 45° to the Earth–Sun line, though this angle varies with solar wind speed. The angle of the IMF to the radial direction reduces with helio-latitude, as the speed of the photospheric footpoint is reduced.

== The Sector structure ==
Depending on the polarity of the photospheric footpoint, the heliospheric magnetic field spirals inward or outward; the magnetic field follows the same shape of spiral in the northern and southern parts of the heliosphere, but with opposite field direction. These two magnetic domains are separated by a current sheet (an electric current that is confined to a curved plane). These alternating domains create the "sector structure", typically with two or four alternations per solar rotation. This heliospheric current sheet has a shape similar to a twirled ballerina skirt, and changes in shape through the solar cycle as the Sun's magnetic field reverses about every 11 years. At sunspot minimum the current sheet tends to be flat, resulting a two-sector structure because of its tilt, ultimately resulting from the angle between the axes of solar rotation and Earth's orbital motion. With greater sunspot activity, four or more sectors appear.

== Magnetic field at Earth orbit ==
A video simulation of Earth's magnetic field interacting with the (solar) interplanetary magnetic field (IMF)

The plasma in the interplanetary medium is also responsible for the strength of the Sun's magnetic field at the orbit of the Earth being over 100 times greater than originally anticipated. If space were a vacuum, then the Sun's magnetic dipole field — about 10^{−4} teslas at the surface of the Sun — would reduce with the inverse cube of the distance to about 10^{−11} teslas. But satellite observations show that it is about 100 times greater at around 10^{−9} teslas. Magnetohydrodynamic (MHD) theory predicts that the motion of a conducting fluid (e.g., the interplanetary medium) in a magnetic field induces electric currents, which in turn generates magnetic fields — and, in this respect, it behaves like an MHD dynamo.

The interplanetary magnetic field at the Earth's orbit varies with waves and other disturbances in the solar wind, known as "space weather." The field is a vector, with components in the radial and azimuthal directions as well as a component perpendicular to the ecliptic. The field varies in strength near the Earth from 1 to 37 nT, averaging about 6 nT. Since 1997, the solar magnetic field has been monitored in real time by the Advanced Composition Explorer (ACE) satellite located in a halo orbit at the Sun–Earth Lagrange Point L1; since July 2016, it has been monitored by the Deep Space Climate Observatory (DSCOVR) satellite, also at the Sun–Earth L1 (with the ACE continuing to serve as a back-up measurement).

== See also ==
- Magnetosphere
- Solar magnetic field
- Solar wind
