= Extragalactic astronomy =

Study of astronomical objects outside the Milky Way Galaxy

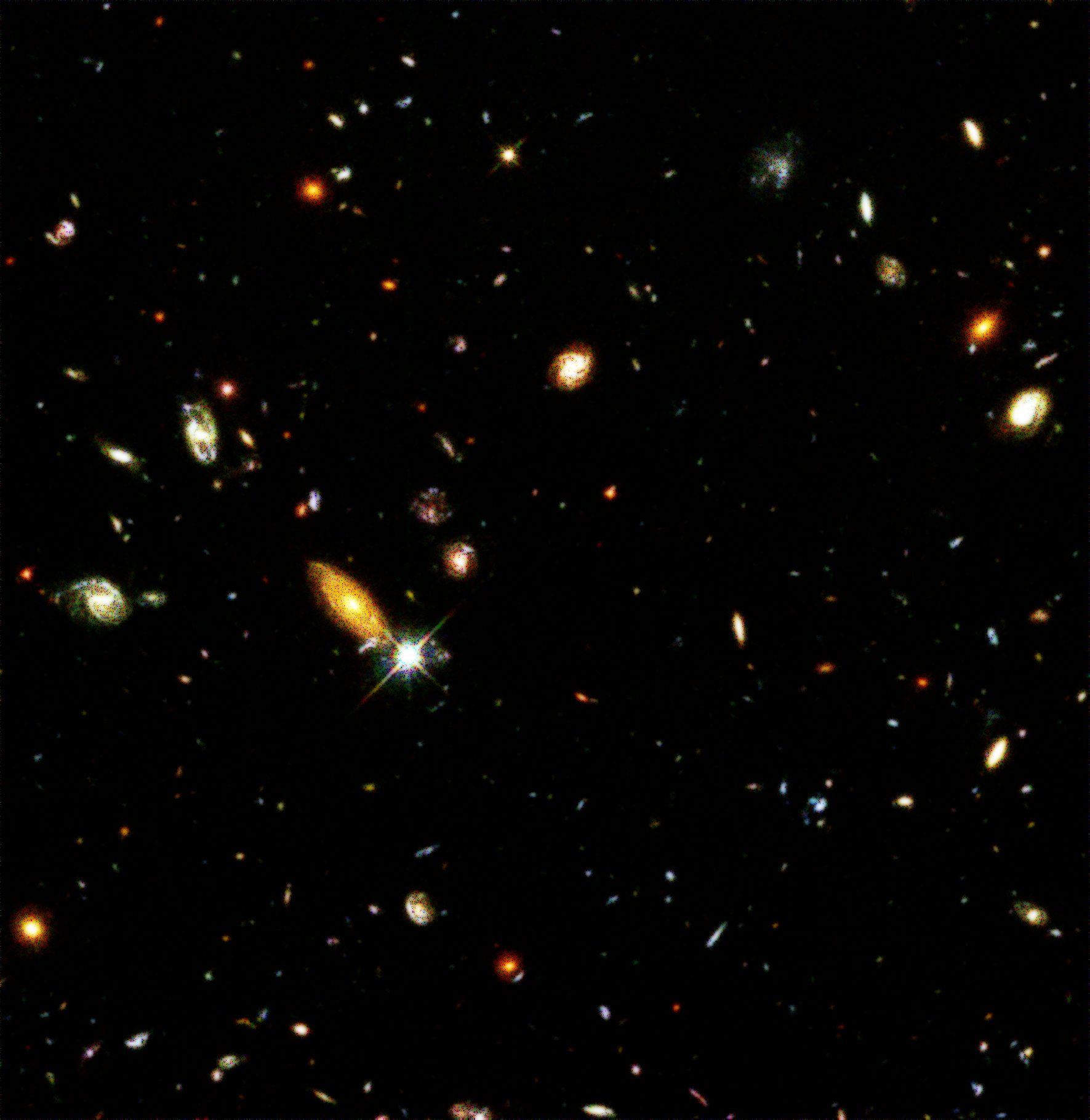
Galaxies in the 1995 Hubble Deep Field

Extragalactic astronomy is the branch of astronomy concerned with objects outside the Milky Way galaxy. In other words, it is the study of all astronomical objects which are not covered by galactic astronomy.

The closest objects in extragalactic astronomy include the galaxies of the Local Group, which are close enough to allow very detailed analyses of their contents (e.g. supernova remnants, stellar associations). As instrumentation has improved, distant objects can now be examined in more detail and so extragalactic astronomy includes objects at nearly the edge of the observable universe. Research into distant galaxies (outside of our local group) is valuable for studying aspects of the universe such as galaxy evolution and active galactic nuclei (AGN) which give insight into physical phenomena (e.g. super massive black hole accretion and the presence of dark matter). It is through extragalactic astronomy that astronomers and physicists are able to study the effects of general relativity such as gravitational lensing and gravitational waves, that are otherwise impossible (or nearly impossible) to study on a galactic scale.

A key interest in extragalactic astronomy is the study of how galaxies behave and interact through the universe. Astronomer's methodologies depend—from theoretical to observation based methods.

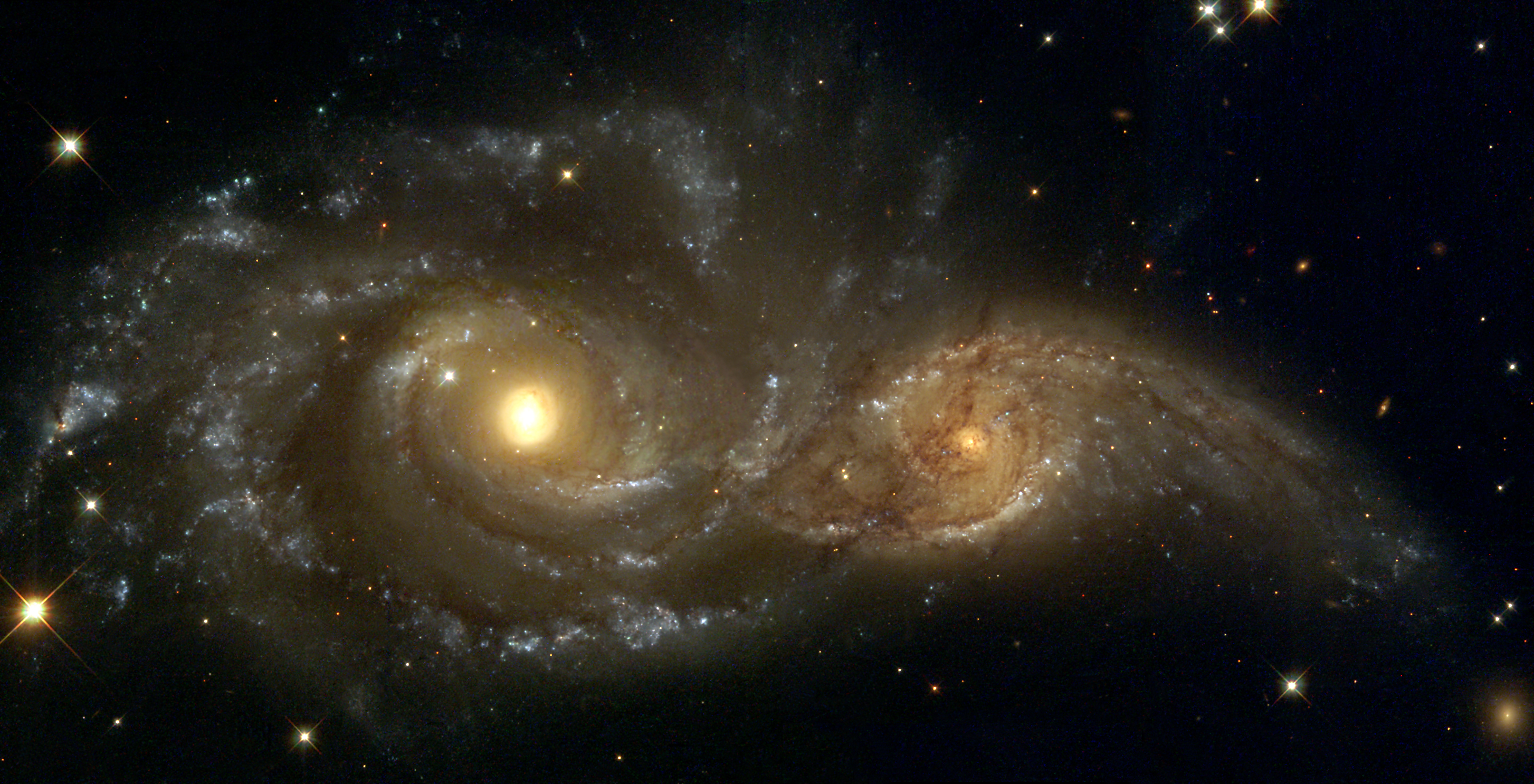
NGC 2207 (the bigger galaxy to the left) and IC 2163 (the smaller galaxy to the right) as seen by the Hubble Space Telescope

Galaxies form in various ways. In most cosmological N-body simulations, the earliest galaxies in the cosmos formed in the first hundreds of millions of years.

These primordial galaxies formed as the enormous reservoirs of gas and dust in the early universe collapsed in on themselves, giving birth to the first stars, now known as Population III Stars. These stars were of enormous masses in the range of 300 to perhaps 3 million solar masses. Due to their large mass, these stars had extremely short lifespans.

== Famous examples ==
- Hubble Deep Field
- LIGO's detection of gravitational waves
- Chandra Deep Field South

== Topics ==
- Active galactic nuclei (AGN), Quasars
- Dark Matter
- Galaxy clusters, Superclusters
- Intergalactic stars
- Intergalactic dust
- The observable universe
- Radio galaxies
- Supernovae
- Extragalactic planet

== See also ==
- Galaxy color–magnitude diagram
- Galaxy formation and evolution
- Observational cosmology
