= Interplanetary scintillation =

Random fluctuations in radio waves of celestial origin

In astronomy, interplanetary scintillation refers to random fluctuations in the intensity of radio waves of celestial origin, on the timescale of a few seconds. It is analogous to the twinkling one sees looking at stars in the sky at night, but in the radio part of the electromagnetic spectrum rather than the visible one. Interplanetary scintillation is the result of radio waves traveling through fluctuations in the density of the electron and protons that make up the solar wind.

== Early study ==
Scintillation, meaning rapid modification, in radio waves due to the small scale structures in the ionosphere, known as ionospheric scintillation, was observed as early as 1951 by Antony Hewish, and he then reported irregularities in radiation received during an observation of a bright radio source in Taurus in 1954. Hewish considered various possibilities, and suggested that irregularities in the solar corona would cause scattering by refraction and could produce the irregularities he observed. A decade later, while making astrometric observations of several bright sources of celestial radio waves using a radio interferometer, Hewish and two collaborators reported "unusual fluctuations of intensity" in a few of the sources. The data strongly supported the notion that the fluctuations resulted from irregularities in the density of the plasma associated with the solar wind, which the authors called interplanetary scintillation, and is recognized as the "discovery of the interplanetary scintillation phenomenon."

In order to study interplanetary scintillation, Hewish built the Interplanetary Scintillation Array at the Mullard Radio Astronomy Observatory. The array consisted of 2,048 dipoles over almost five acres of land, and was built to constantly survey the sky at a time resolution of about 0.1 seconds. This high time resolution set it apart from many other radio telescopes of the time, as astronomers did not expect emission from an object to feature such rapid variation. Soon after observations were under way, Hewish's student Jocelyn Bell turned this assumption on its head, when she noticed a signal which was soon recognized as emanating from a new class of object, the pulsar. Thus "it was an investigation of interplanetary scintillation that led to the discovery of pulsars, even though the discovery was a by-product rather than the purpose of the investigation."

== Cause ==
Scintillation occurs as a result of variations in the refractive index of the medium through which waves are traveling. The solar wind is a plasma, composed primarily of electrons and lone protons, and the variations in the index of refraction are caused by variations in the density of the plasma. Different indices of refraction result in phase changes between waves traveling through different locations, which results in interference. As the waves interfere, both the frequency of the wave and its angular size are broadened, and the intensity varies.

== Applications ==
=== Solar wind ===
As interplanetary scintillation is caused by the solar wind, measurements of interplanetary scintillation can "be utilized as valuable and inexpensive probes of the solar wind." As already noted, the observed information, the intensity fluctuations, is related to the desired information, the structure of the solar wind, through the phase change experienced by waves traveling through the solar wind. The root mean square (RMS) intensity fluctuations are often expressed relative to the mean intensity from the source, in a term called the scintillation index, which is written as

$$m = \frac{\langle \Delta I^2 \rangle^{1/2}}{\langle I \rangle}.$$

This can be related to the phase deviation caused by turbulence in the solar wind by considering the incident electromagnetic plane wave, and yields

$m \approx \sqrt{2}\Delta \phi.$

The next step, relating the phase change to the density structure of the solar wind, can be made more simple by assuming that the density of the plasma is highest towards the sun, which allows the "thin screen approximation." Doing so eventually gives an RMS deviation for the phase of

$\phi_{RMS} = \lambda r_e \left( a L \right)^{1/2} \left[ \langle \delta N^2 \rangle \right]^{1/2},$

where $\lambda$ is the wavelength of the incoming wave, $r_e$ is the classical electron radius, $L$ is the thickness of the "screen," or the length scale over which the majority of the scattering takes place, $a$ is the typical size scale of density irregularities, and $\delta N^2$ is the root mean squared variation of the electron density about the mean density. Thus interplanetary scintillation can be used as a probe of the density of the solar wind. Interplanetary scintillation measurements may also be used to infer the velocity of the solar wind.

Stable features of the solar wind can be particularly well studied. At a given time, observers on Earth have a fixed line of sight through the solar wind, but as the Sun rotates over an approximately month-long period, the perspective on Earth changes. It is then possible to do "tomographic reconstruction of the distribution of the solar wind" for the features of the solar wind which remain static.

=== Compact sources ===
The power spectrum that is observed from a source which has experienced interplanetary scintillation is dependent upon the angular size of the source. Thus interplanetary scintillation measurements can be used to determine the size of compact radio sources, such as active galactic nuclei.

== See also ==
- Interplanetary space
- Interplanetary medium
- Interplanetary dust
- Interplanetary dust cloud
- Interplanetary magnetic field
- Interstellar space
- Interstellar medium
- Interstellar dust
- Intergalactic space
- Intergalactic medium
- Intergalactic dust

== Bibliography ==
- Artyukh, Vadim S. (2001). "Investigations of AGNs by the interplanetary scintillation method". Astrophysics and Space Science. 278 (1/2): 185–188. Bibcode:2001Ap&SS.278..185A. doi:10.1023/A:1013154728238. S2CID 123391914.
- Alurkar, S.K. (1997). Solar and Interplanetary Disturbances. Singapore: World Scientific. ISBN 978-981-02-2925-2.
- Hewish, A. (1955). "The Irregular Structure of the Outer Regions of the Solar Corona". Proceedings of the Royal Society of London. Series A, Mathematical and Physical Sciences. 228 (1173): 238–251. Bibcode:1955RSPSA.228..238H. doi:10.1098/rspa.1955.0046. JSTOR 99619. S2CID 122176976.
- Hewish, A., Scott, P.F., and Wills, D. (September 1964). "Interplanetary Scintillation of Small Diameter Radio Sources". Nature. 203 (4951): 1214–1217. Bibcode:1964Natur.203.1214H. doi:10.1038/2031214a0. S2CID 4203129.
- Jokipii, J.R. (1973). "Turbulence and Scintillations in the Interplanetary Plasma". Annual Review of Astronomy and Astrophysics. 11 (1): 1–28. Bibcode:1973ARA&A..11....1J. doi:10.1146/annurev.aa.11.090173.000245.
- Lyne, A.G.; Graham-Smith, F. (1990). Pulsar astronomy. Cambridge: Cambridge University Press. ISBN 978-0-521-83954-9.
- Manchester, R.N.; Taylor, J.H. (1977). Pulsars. San Francisco: W.H. Freeman and Company. ISBN 978-0-7167-0358-7.
- Shishov, V.I., Shishova, T.D. (1978). "The influence of the source sizes on the interplanetary scintillation spectra - Theory". Astronomicheskii Zhurnal. 55: 411–418. Bibcode:1978AZh....55..411S.
