= Ballerina skirt =

Ballet garment

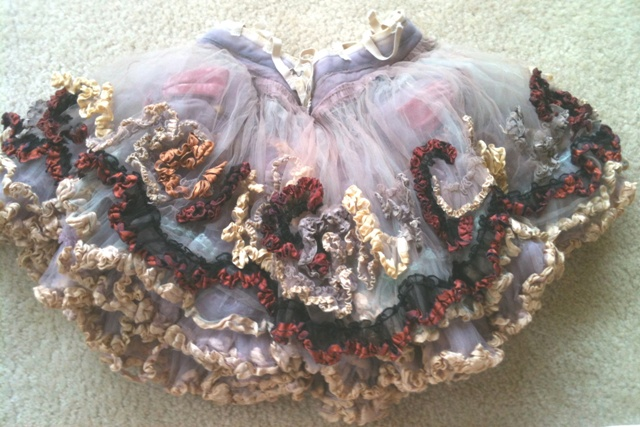
Skirt designed by Barbara Karinska for the New York City Ballet’s production of "Western Symphony".

A ballerina skirt, also referred to as a Juliet skirt or a romance skirt, is a full skirt that is worn by ballet dancers and is composed of multiple layers of fabric. Ballet dancers wear the longer version of the skirt, while for fashion purposes the skirt is worn shorter, like a mini skirt for better dancing, the cocktail version. The standard ballerina attire is composed of fabric with a wire, in order for tulle to be visualized as stiff when it is around their waists. The Juliet styled skirt is free-flowing and covers the majority of their legs to place a high emphasis on the performer's legs.

The ballerina skirt is typically made up of five to twelve layers of tulle fabric. A ballerina skirt is portrayed as feminine and elegant, as well as being associated with the traditional attire for classical ballet performances.

There are several different types of the ballerina skirts that are used when performing. Those include: romantic, classic, pancake, balanchine and platter skirts.

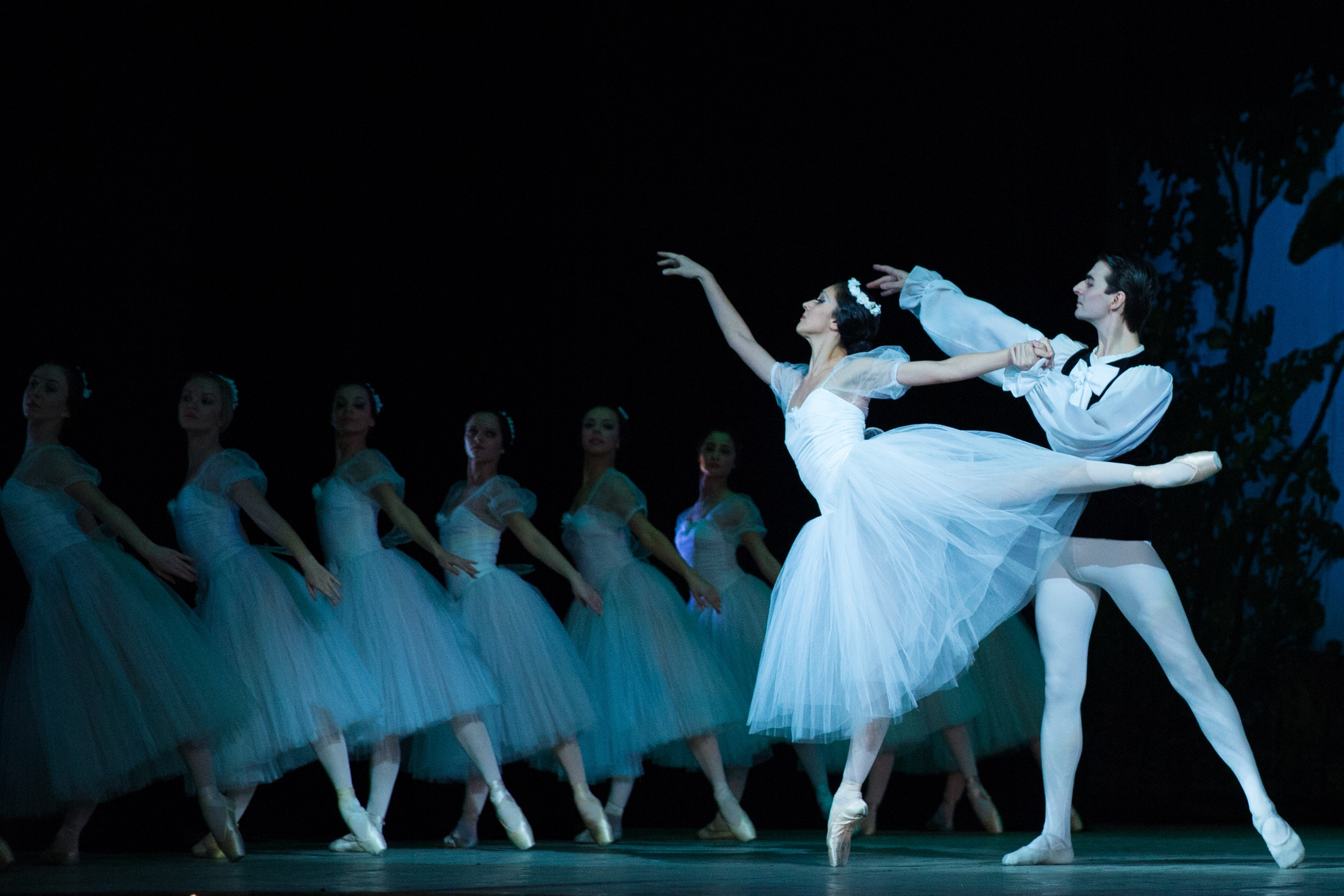
Scene from Les Sylphides

== History ==
From early 1550s, Roman dress had a strong influence on costume design: silk skirts were voluminous, and key details were often exaggerated, which was usually based on everyday wear. During the seventeenth century, silks, satins, and other fabrics were embroidered with real gold and precious stones. While this increased the level of decoration with ballet costumes, the heavy garments and supporting structures did not allow the dancers to perform graceful gestures and ultimately weighed them down.

During the early 1700s the panier, a hooped petticoat, was just invented that help raised the skirts a few inches off the ground. When the Romantic movement came about, ballet costumes were emphasized more to be tight-fitting. The romantic tutu came about in Paris in 1832 when Marie Taglioni premiered in the skirt in the ballet performance La Sylphide. The skirt is a bell-shaped calf-length style; it falls halfway between the knees and ankles and it was composed of layers of stiffened tarlatan or starched, sheer cotton muslin that gave the illusion of fullness without being heavy. By 1870 other ballerinas began wearing tutus cut above the knee allowing to show complex footwork and to give visual of the ruffled underpants attached to the skirt.

Ballet skirts began to get shorter during the 20th century. Some ballet skirts had tarlatan layers which help create a flared-from-the-body effect. In the 1940s wire, hoops were inserted to enable the skirt to stand out from the hips. Tulle soon replaced tarlatan making the hoop an option rather than being a necessity. The most common style today is the short skirt which appeared in the late nineteenth century and it is made of different fabrics and materials which range from fluffy to thin fabrics.

This skirt gained popularity in the fashion world in the 1950s. Women began to dress extremely feminine and focused on the decor and accessories that they could add to their attire, as well as the appearance of a narrow waistline. Throughout this time period, women were seen wearing these tight bodices and flowy skirts to emphasize the narrow waist look

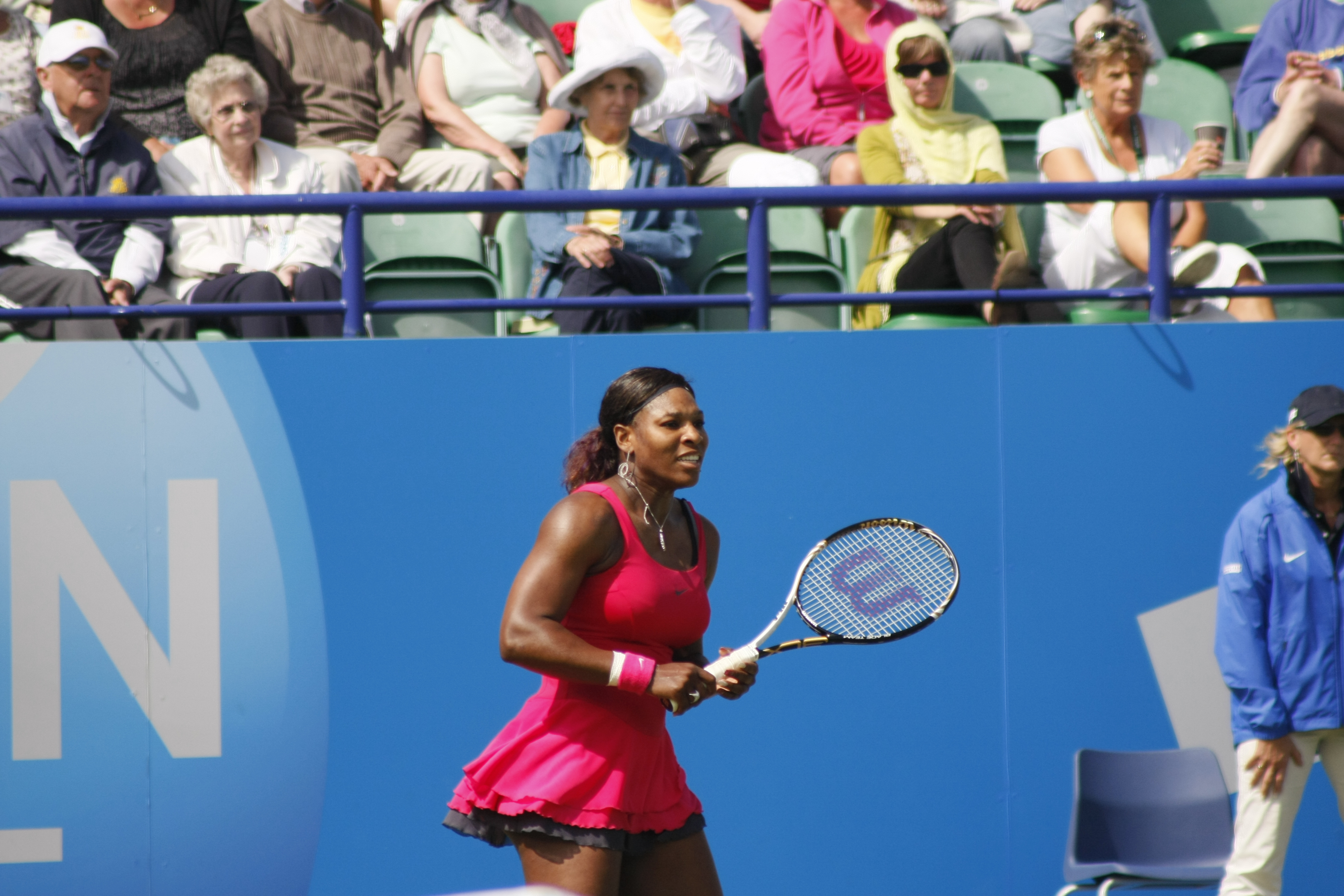
Serena Williams wearing a ballet skirt at a tennis match.

Celebrities and actresses played a huge role in the popularity of the ballerina skirt. Marilyn Monroe was seen wearing ballerina skirts in her “Ballerina” series of photographs, this is what brought the skirts from performance attire to everyday wear during the 1950s. In the show Sex in the City actress Sarah Jessica Parker is seen in the opening credits wearing a tutu and ends up showing the symbolism of the character, yet it also inspired the world to try out the look. Fashion designers, such as Lacroix and Valentino have more recently been looking toward ballet for inspiration, as well as Serena Williams being a world representative during her tennis matches for the ballet skirt.

== Production process ==
Ballerina skirts have been seen as a direct symbol of ballet performers, but they are widely known as an art form. One of the most known costume designers, Barbara Karinska was known for her tutu-producing skills; she even named herself the "tutu-mechanic". The production begins with the steps of creating a panty on the inside layer and then building from that. The next part that is developed is the basque portion, known as the waist portion. This is composed of heavy fabrics that are cut and designed to fit dancers, who are being tailored to fit exactly into that specific skirt. The panels are then stitched together; this section determines the fullness of the skirt and helps with the durability of the skirt. All skirts can be cut differently depending on the style of the performance and the look that is being desired. The last step is to attach the bodice to the skirt.

== Types of ballerina skirt ==
Ballerinas can often be seen in several types of ballerina skirts. The Romantic tutu was first made famous through Marie Taglioni; since she was wearing such a flowing skirt, her pointe shoes were easily recognized. The Romantic tutu is a large bell-shaped skirt composed of soft material. It covers the majority of the dancer's legs, down to the ankle. The Classical tutu has several variations, but the main reason it was created was so that the dancers could be freer and it would not be so constrictive of their dancing. Bell-styled tutus are known for their bell-like shape; they are made to be short and stiff with several layers of netting to help with framing the flow-like appearance of the skirt.

== See also ==
- Tutu
