= Interplanetary medium =

Material which fills the Solar System

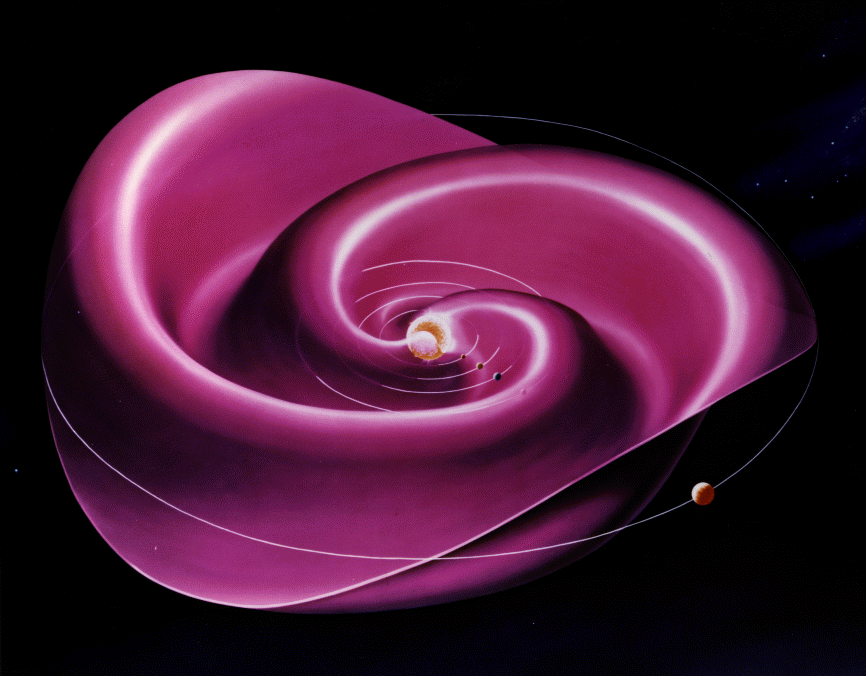
The heliospheric current sheet results from the influence of the Sun's rotating magnetic field on the plasma in the interplanetary medium.

The interplanetary medium (IPM) or interplanetary space consists of the mass and energy which fills the Solar System, and through which all the larger Solar System bodies, such as planets, dwarf planets, asteroids, and comets, move. The IPM stops at the heliopause, outside of which the interstellar medium begins. Before 1950, interplanetary space was widely considered to either be an empty vacuum, or consisting of "aether".

== Composition and physical characteristics ==
The interplanetary medium includes interplanetary dust and gas, cosmic rays, and hot plasma from the solar wind. The density of the medium is very low, with the solar wind component decreasing in inverse proportion to the square of the distance from the Sun. The solar wind is variable, and may be affected by magnetic fields and solar activity events such as coronal mass ejections. Typical particle densities in the interplanetary medium are about 5-40 particles/cm^{3}, but exhibit substantial variation. In the vicinity of the Earth, it contains about 5 particles/cm^{3}, but values as high as 100 particles/cm^{3} have been observed. For comparison, air at sea level contains about 2.9 × 10^{19} particles per cm^{3}.

The temperature of the interplanetary medium varies through the solar system. Joseph Fourier estimated that interplanetary medium must have temperatures comparable to those observed at Earth's poles, but on faulty grounds: lacking modern estimates of atmospheric heat transport, he saw no other means to explain the relative consistency of Earth's climate. A very hot interplanetary medium remained a minor position among geophysicists as late as 1959, when Chapman proposed a temperature on the order of 10000 K, but observation in Low Earth orbit of the exosphere soon contradicted his position. In fact, both Fourier and Chapman's final predictions were correct: because the interplanetary medium is so rarefied, it does not exhibit thermodynamic equilibrium. Instead, different components have different temperatures. The solar wind exhibits temperatures consistent with Chapman's estimate in cislunar space, and dust particles near Earth's orbit exhibit temperatures 257–298 K (3–77 °F), averaging about 283 K (50 °F). In general, the solar wind temperature decreases proportional to the inverse-square of the distance to the Sun; the temperature of the dust decreases proportional to the inverse cube root of the distance. For dust particles within the asteroid belt, typical temperatures range from 200 K (−100 °F) at 2.2 AU down to 165 K (−163 °F) at 3.2 AU.

The solar wind component of the interplanetary medium is a plasma, or gas of ions, and has the physical characteristics of a plasma, rather than a simple gas. For example, it carries the Sun's magnetic field with it, is highly electrically conductive (resulting in the heliospheric current sheet), forms plasma double layers where it comes into contact with a planetary magnetosphere or at the heliopause, and exhibits filamentation (such as in aurorae).

The plasma in the interplanetary medium is also responsible for the strength of the Sun's magnetic field at the orbit of the Earth being over 100 times greater than originally anticipated. If space were an ideal vacuum, then the Sun's 10^{−4} tesla magnetic dipole field would reduce with the cube of the distance to about 10^{−11} tesla. But satellite observations show that it is about 100 times greater at around 7 nT. Magnetohydrodynamic (MHD) theory predicts that the motion of a conducting fluid (e.g., the interplanetary medium) in a magnetic field induces electric currents which in turn generate magnetic fields, and in this respect it behaves like an MHD dynamo.

== Extent of the interplanetary medium ==
The outer edge of the heliosphere is the boundary between the flow of the solar wind and the interstellar medium. This boundary is known as the heliopause and is believed to be a fairly sharp transition that was measured at a distance of around 120 AU from the Sun by the Voyager missions. The interplanetary medium thus fills the volume contained within the heliopause. The actual shape of this volume remains uncertain, extending only 100 AU toward the solar apex but up to 800 AU in the polar direction.

== Interaction with planets ==
How the interplanetary medium interacts with planets depends on whether they have magnetic fields or not. Bodies such as the Moon have no magnetic field and the solar wind can impact directly on their surface. Over billions of years, the lunar regolith has acted as a collector for solar wind particles, and so studies of rocks from the lunar surface can be valuable in studies of the solar wind.

High-energy particles from the solar wind impacting on the lunar surface also cause it to emit faintly at X-ray wavelengths.

Planets with their own magnetic field, such as the Earth and Jupiter, are surrounded by a magnetosphere within which their magnetic field is dominant over the Sun's. This disrupts the flow of the solar wind, which is channelled around the magnetosphere. Material from the solar wind can "leak" into the magnetosphere, causing aurorae and also populating the Van Allen radiation belts with ionised material.

== Observable phenomena of the interplanetary medium ==
The interplanetary dust cloud illuminated and visible as zodiacal light, with its parts the false dawn, gegenschein and the rest of its band, which is visually crossed by the Milky Way, in this composite image of the night sky above the northern and southern hemisphere

The interplanetary medium is responsible for several optical phenomena visible from Earth. Zodiacal light is a broad band of faint light sometimes seen after sunset and before sunrise, stretched along the ecliptic and appearing brightest near the horizon. This glow is caused by sunlight scattered by dust particles in the interplanetary medium between Earth and the Sun.

A similar phenomenon centered at the antisolar point, gegenschein is visible in a naturally dark, moonless night sky. Much fainter than zodiacal light, this effect is caused by sunlight backscattered by dust particles beyond Earth's orbit.

== History ==
The term "interplanetary" appears to have been first used in print in 1691 by the scientist Robert Boyle: "The air is different from the æther (or vacuum) in the... interplanetary spaces" Boyle Hist. Air. In 1898, American astronomer Charles Augustus Young wrote: "Inter-planetary space is a vacuum, far more perfect than anything we can produce by artificial means..." (The Elements of Astronomy, Charles Augustus Young, 1898).

The notion that space is considered to be a vacuum filled with an "aether", or just a cold, dark vacuum continued up until the 1950s. Tufts University Professor of astronomy, Kenneth R. Lang, writing in 2000 noted, "Half a century ago, most people visualized our planet as a solitary sphere traveling in a cold, dark vacuum of space around the Sun". In 2002, Akasofu stated "The view that interplanetary space is a vacuum into which the Sun intermittently emitted corpuscular streams was changed radically by Ludwig Biermann (1951, 1953) who proposed on the basis of comet tails, that the Sun continuously blows its atmosphere out in all directions at supersonic speed" (Syun-Ichi Akasofu, Exploring the Secrets of the Aurora, 2002)

== See also ==
- Interplanetary dust cloud
- Interplanetary magnetic field
- Interstellar space
- Interstellar medium
- Interstellar dust
- Intergalactic space
- Intergalactic medium
- Intergalactic dust
- Space physics
