= Dust lane =

Dense obscuring band of interstellar dust

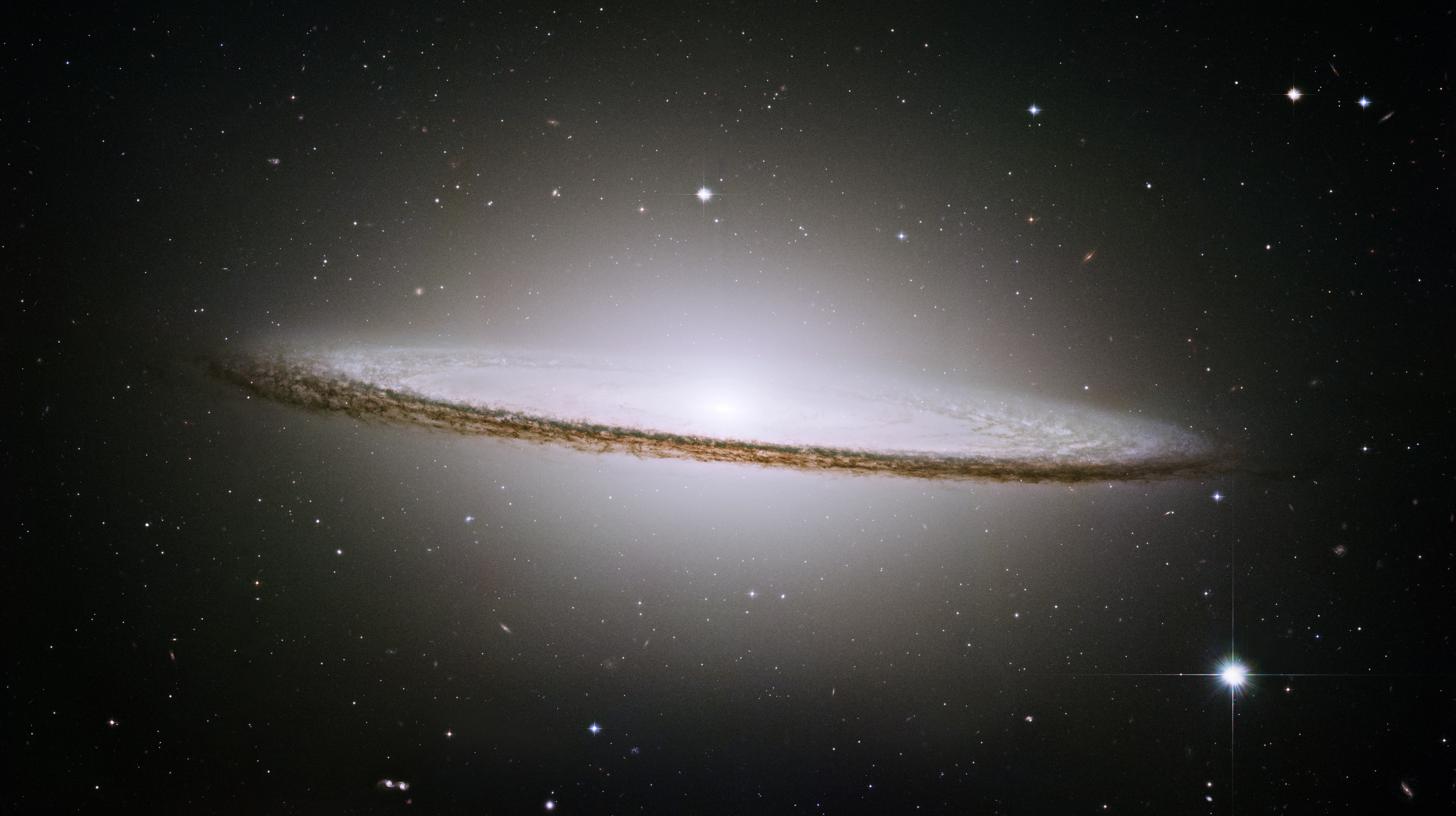
The Sombrero Galaxy features a prominent dust lane

A dust lane consists of relatively dense, obscuring clouds of interstellar dust, observed as a dark swath against the background of brighter object(s), especially a galaxy. These dust lanes can usually be seen in spiral galaxies, such as the Milky Way, when viewed from the edge. Due to the dense and relatively thick nature of this dust, observed light from a galaxy can be reduced by dust lanes by up to several magnitudes. In the Milky Way, this attenuation of visible light makes it impossible to see the stars behind the Great Rift through the bulge around the Galactic Center from Earth. This dust, as well as the gasses also found within these lanes, mixes and combines to form stars and planets. The gas in the dust lanes is funneled toward the Central Molecular Zone. Approximately one third of the gas will combine with the CMZ. The rest will overshoot and accrete at a later time.

The presence of a dust lane is most apparent in disc galaxies that are viewed edge on. although they are absent in many low-mass late-type galaxies. However, the absence of a dust lane does not signify a lack of dust but that it is more dispersed throughout the galaxy. Simulations have shown that in barred spiral galaxies the strength of the bar has an effect on the curvature of the dust lanes. Galaxies with weak bars result in curved dust lanes whereas strong bars result in straight dust lanes.

The rate of massive star formation in and around the Milky Way CMZ has been observationally correlated with the presence of larger-scale, gravitationally-bound dust lanes within high-density giant molecular clouds (GMCs). The quasi-stable filament structures, in hydrostatic equilibrium, can eventually undergo core collapse on scales larger than typical for observed dense molecular cloud (DMC) behavior.

== See also ==
- Extinction (astronomy)
- Interplanetary medium
  - Intergalactic dust
  - Interplanetary dust
  - Interstellar dust
- Molecular Clouds
  - Star formation
