= Intergalactic dust =

Cosmic dust in between galaxies in intergalactic space

Intergalactic dust is cosmic dust in between galaxies in intergalactic space. Evidence for intergalactic dust has been suggested as early as 1949, and study of it grew throughout the late 20th century. There are large variations in the distribution of intergalactic dust. Dust may affect intergalactic distance measurements, such as supernovae and quasars in other galaxies. Partially due to the dust's absorption and re-emission of visible light, observations of more distant astronomical objects have greater apparent magnitude when conducted in infrared.

Intergalactic dust can form intergalactic dust clouds, known since the 1960s to exist around some galaxies. By the 1980s, at least four intergalactic dust clouds had been discovered within several megaparsecs of the Milky Way galaxy, exemplified by the Okroy Cloud.

== See also ==
- Astrochemistry – Study of molecules in the Universe and their reactions
- Atomic and molecular astrophysics – Field of study on atomic and molecular particles in space
- Cosmochemistry – Study of the chemical composition of matter in the universe
- Extragalactic astronomy – Study of astronomical objects outside the Milky Way Galaxy
- Extraterrestrial materials – Natural objects that originated in outer space
- Hypervelocity star – Study of the movement of stars
- Intergalactic medium – Void between celestial bodies
- Intergalactic space – Void between celestial bodies
- Intergalactic star – Star not gravitationally bound to any galaxy
- Interstellar medium – Matter and radiation in the space between the star systems in a galaxy
- List of interstellar and circumstellar molecules
- Warm–hot intergalactic medium – Plasma that cosmologists believe exists between galaxies
