= 3C 332 =

Radio galaxy in the constellation Corona Borealis

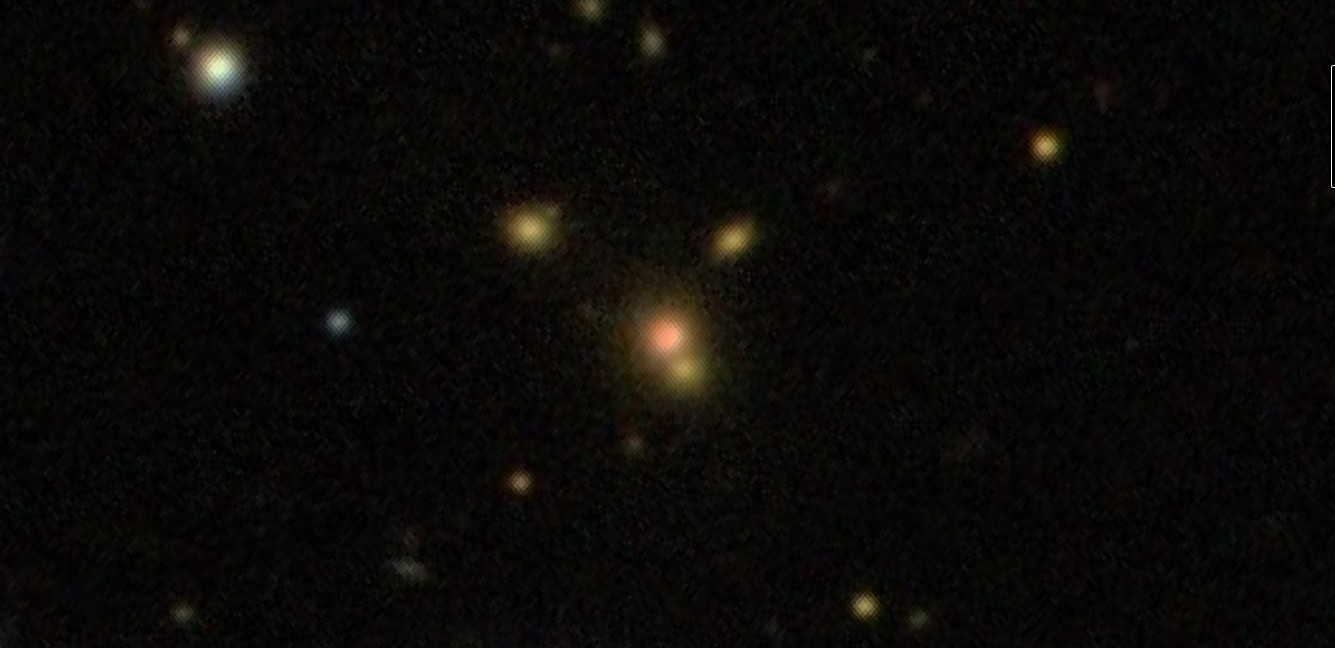
- The radio galaxy 3C 332

Observation data (J2000.0 epoch)
- Constellation: Corona Borealis
- Right ascension: 16^{h} 17^{m} 42.53^{s}
- Declination: +32° 22′ 34.38″
- Redshift: 0.151019
- Heliocentric radial velocity: 45,274 km/s
- Distance: 2.063 Gly
- Apparent magnitude (V): 17.45
- Apparent magnitude (B): 18.25

Characteristics
- Type: Radio galaxy Sy1
- Size: ~258,700 ly (79.33 kpc) (estimated)

Other designations
- 4C +32.51, B2 1615+32, 2MASX J16174254+3222344, LEDA 1993953, DA 409, PGC 57750, NRAO 0498, Cul 1615+325, CoNFIG 246, THING 588018054588137497

3C 332 is a broad-line Fanaroff-Riley Type II radio galaxy located in the constellation of Corona Borealis. It has a redshift of (z) 0.151 and was first discovered in the Third Cambridge Catalogue of Radio Sources survey in 1962. This object has also been referred as a change-looking quasar (an active galactic nuclei (AGN) showing extreme variability that results in a transition from type 1 to type 2 AGN).

== Description ==
3C 332 is described as an elliptical galaxy according to imaging made by Hubble Space Telescope (HST). Its appearance is relaxed with no signs of a dust lane. It has a companion located southwest.

As a Fanaroff–Riley Type II class radio galaxy with low luminosity, 3C 332 exhibits polarization reaching values between 4% and 16%. There is also evidence of diffused radio emission surrounding its bright central nucleus found unresolved but aligned by 70°. There are two radio lobes on each side of the galaxy. A jet is seen heading in a southerly direction.

The magnetic field structure of 3C 332 appears to be following a brightness contour line. The line is mainly dominated along its southern radio lobe, transversing in the direction of the northern radio lobe located near its central component. Surrounding the galaxy's hotspots there are high surface brightness regions with an emission ridge connecting both the central component and southern hotspot.

In December 1990, a line profile was discovered in 3C 332. Based on results, it might arise from its accretion disk, described as small with an unstable inner region, which subsequently forms a hot torus. This in turn photoionizes the galaxy's outer disk region. A broad hydrogen-alpha (Hα) line was also found according to spectroscopic observations, with displaced peaks of between –7250 ± 200 and 9800 ± 200 kilometers per second.

The supermassive black hole mass of 3C 332 is estimated to be 8.08 M_{☉}. However a study in 2011 reestimated the black hole mass to be 8.64 ± 0.01 M_{☉} with an Eddington limit of (5.3±0.1)×10^{46} erg s^{−1}. The bolometric luminosity of 3C 332 is 2.5×10^{45} erg s^{−1}.
