= 3C 287.1 =

Radio galaxy located in the constellation of Virgo

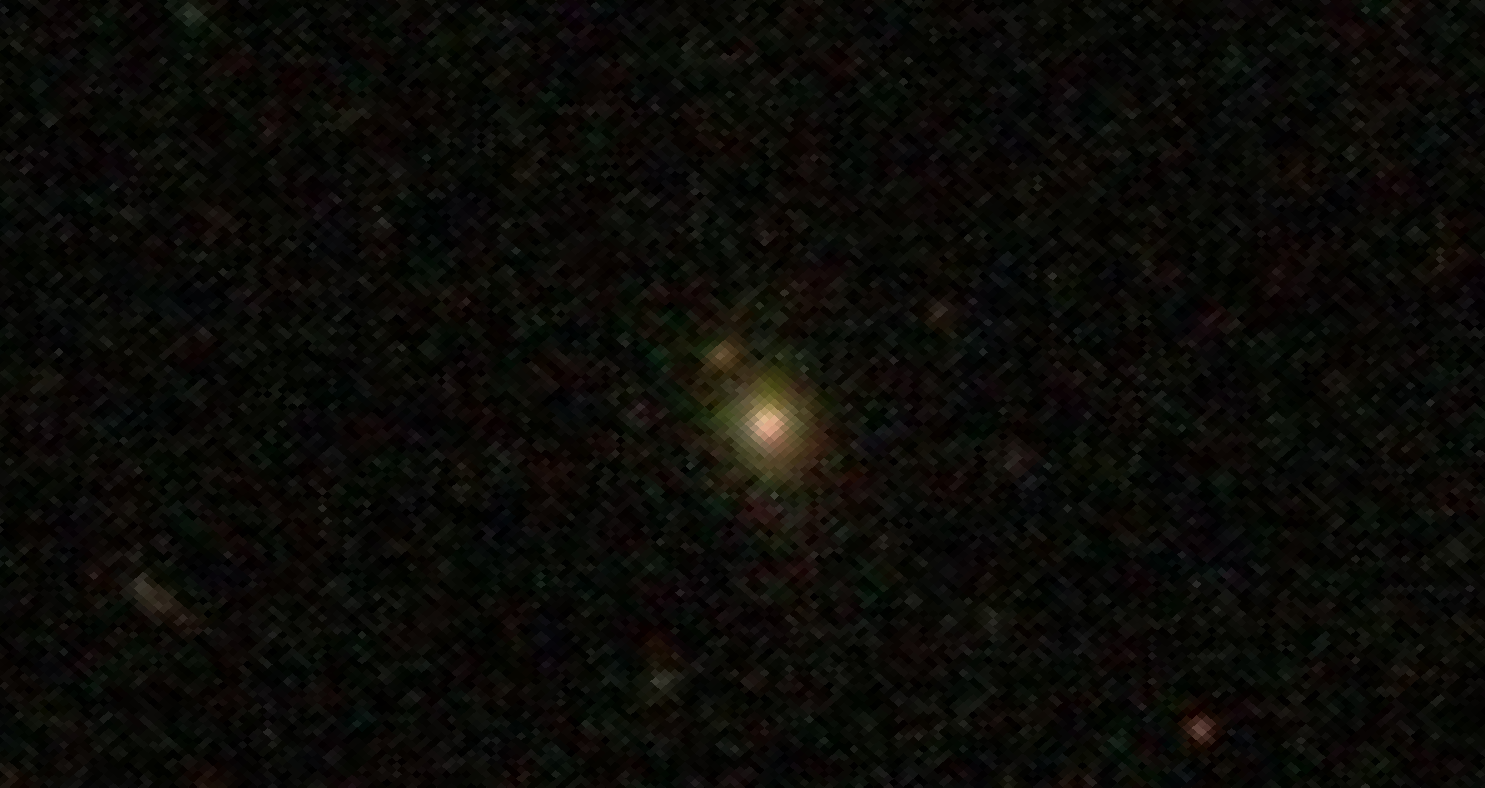
- SDSS image of 3C 287.1

Observation data (J2000.0 epoch)
- Constellation: Virgo
- Right ascension: 13^{h} 32^{m} 53.27^{s}
- Declination: +02° 00′ 45.69″
- Redshift: 0.215818
- Heliocentric radial velocity: 64,701 km/s
- Distance: 2.698 Gly
- Apparent magnitude (V): 18.49

Characteristics
- Type: N galaxy;BLRG Sy1
- Size: ~306,000 ly (93.7 kpc) (estimated)

Other designations
- 4C +02.36, LEDA 2818435, PKS 1330+02, 2MASX J13325325+0200454, 2dFGRS N401Z254, RBS 1284, DA 347, NRAO 0426, CoNFIG 170, RX J1332.8+0200, 1ES 1330+022

3C 287.1 is a radio galaxy located in the constellation of Virgo. The redshift of the galaxy is (z) 0.215 and it was first described in the Third Cambridge Catalogue of Radio Sources in 1962. The galaxy is also classified as a Seyfert galaxy based on image-tube plate observations and designated as PKS 1330+02 in the Parkes Observatory Survey.

== Description ==
3C 287.1 is classified as a broad-line Fanaroff-Riley Class Type 2 radio galaxy. When observed with the Very Large Array (VLA) it is found to have a radio core and a bright one-sided jet located in the western radio lobe that is described as having a knotty and curved appearance, with further evidence of it displaying a sharp bend angle in a northern direction at the eastern hotspot location. This jet features a counter-jet that corresponds to a straight jet with a great beaming velocity of 0.3c and a line of sight angle less than 70°. The total optical polarization of the galaxy is estimated to be little as three percent.

The host galaxy of 3C 287.1 is a giant elliptical galaxy with an elongated appearance. The stellar population of the galaxy is estimated to be dominated by old stars aged eight billion years and it has a disky isothope morphology. There is also evidence of a compact secondary nucleus with a separation of less than one arcsecond in the galaxy, indicating the possibility of a galaxy merger. A linear tidal feature is seen 35 kiloparsecs in a southwest direction. There are several companion objects in the galaxy's field, with one of them located northeast.

The galaxy displays an extended emission-line region. When observed, the region is only shown as marginally resolved, with evidence of it also being shown detached in the southern direction, perpendicular to the jet. This region is estimated to display offset velocities reaching 400 kilometers per second.
