= 3C 263 =

Quasar in Ursa Major

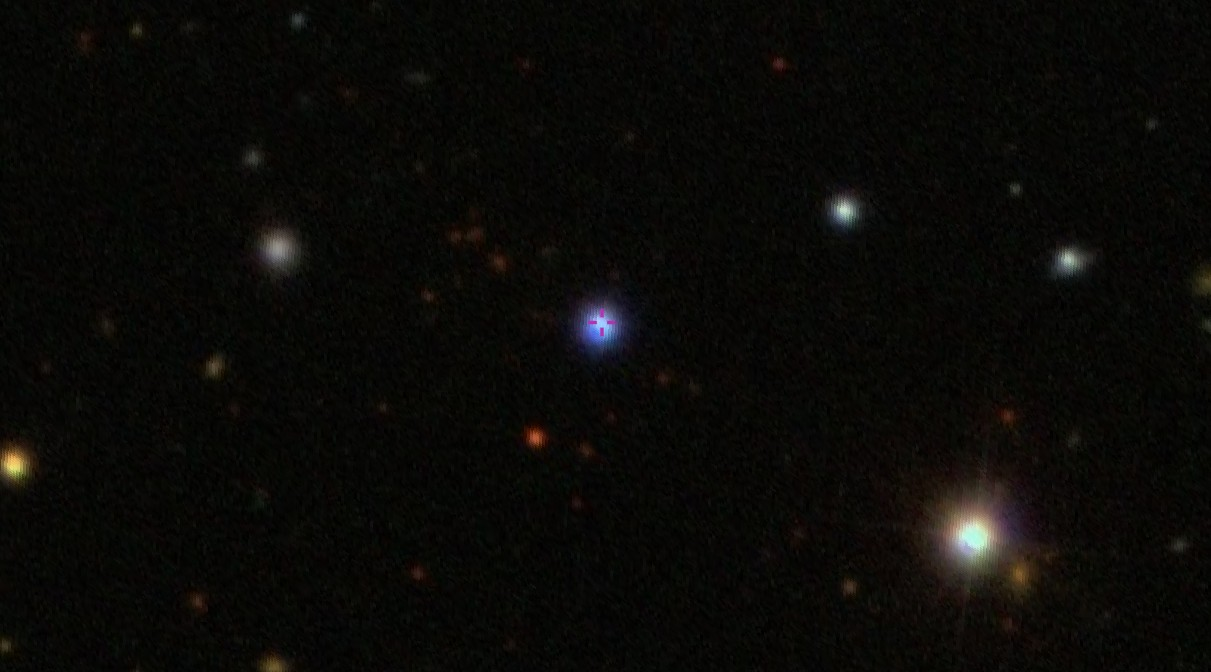
- The quasar 3C 263.

Observation data (J2000.0 epoch)
- Constellation: Ursa Major
- Right ascension: 11^{h} 39^{m} 57.0250^{s}
- Declination: +65° 47′ 49.482″
- Redshift: 0.646000
- Heliocentric radial velocity: 193,666 km/s
- Distance: 5.817 Gly
- Apparent magnitude (V): 16.32
- Apparent magnitude (B): 16.50

Characteristics
- Type: Opt.var; Sy1, LPQ

Other designations
- DA 305, 4C 66.13, LEDA 2817636, 2E 2503, PG 1137+660, QSO B1137+660, RBS 1014

3C 263 is a radio-loud, lobe-dominated quasar located in the constellation of Ursa Major. It has a redshift of (z) 0.652 and was discovered in 1966 by astronomers. It is known to show evidence of superluminal motion and is located inside the center of a moderate rich galaxy cluster.

== Description ==
3C 263 is classified as a Fanaroff-Riley Type II source. It is also a steep spectrum source with its radio structure best described as a double-lobed structure. When imaged by Very Large Array, its lobes are asymmetrically placed and of unequal brightness. One lobe is described as jetted and the other as being relaxed. There is also a linear jet containing bright, elongated knots and a diffused emission region located 2 arcseconds from the hotspot region. There is another weak component showing a flux density of 0.13 × 10^{−26} W m^{−2} Hz^{−1}.

Observations by Chandra X-ray Observatory, showed the compact component of the quasar is made up of several subcomponents; mainly an extended halo, a weak leading component and a bright central component with a flat two-point radio spectrum. Parsec-scale observations showed the source as a core-jet structure with a bright nucleus. Based on results, its jet contains three knots which in turn projects out from the radio core by 2.5 mas.

The nucleus of 3C 263 is found variable. It exhibits a variation amplitude that is greater than 40 mJy at 5 GHz. Superluminal motion was also detected inside its nucleus with evidence of parsec-scale jet components showing acceleration and nonradial motion. According to results, the inner jet component has a transverse velocity of 0.7h^{−1} c while the outer jet component has a velocity of 1.2-2.5 h^{−1} c. Soft X-ray emission was also found surrounding the object with its luminosity calculated as 16.4 × 10^{43} erg s^{−1}.

The host galaxy of 3C 263 is described as a flat-system according to Hubble Space Telescope. Based on observations, the host has an aligned major axis along the position angle of 350°. The absolute magnitude of the host is approximately 22.2. Faint galaxies have also been found surrounding the object. A multiphase absorption system was found at redshift (z) 0.32566 towards the object, showing detections of neon elements.
