= 3C 357 =

Radio galaxy located in the constellation Hercules

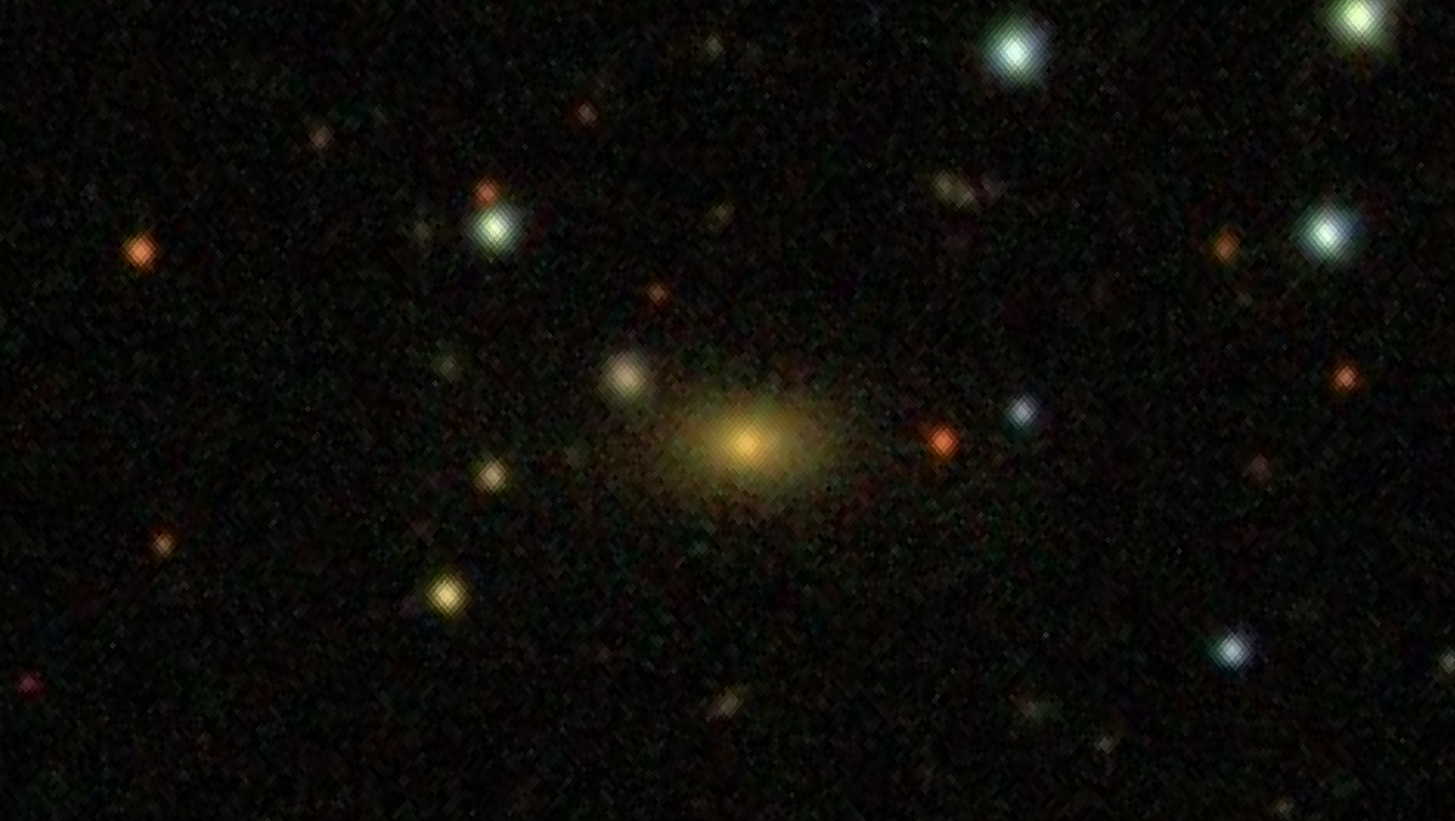
- The radio galaxy 3C 357.

Observation data (J2000.0 epoch)
- Constellation: Hercules
- Right ascension: 17^{h} 28^{m} 20.09^{s}
- Declination: +31° 46′ 02.74″
- Redshift: 0.166460
- Heliocentric radial velocity: 49,903 km/s
- Distance: 2.135 Gly
- Apparent magnitude (B): 15.5

Characteristics
- Type: E
- Size: ~377,000 ly (115.7 kpc) (estimated)

Other designations
- 4C +31.47, B2 1726+31, 2MASX J17282013+3146030, PGC 60351, DA 435, NRAO 0528, TXS 1726+318

3C 357 is a radio galaxy located in the constellation of Hercules. The redshift of the object is (z) 0.166 and it was first discovered in the Third Cambridge Catalogue of Radio Sources survey in 1962 by A.S. Bennett. It is also documented in the Fourth Cambridge survey, designated as 4C 31.47.

== Description ==
3C 357 is classified as a Type II Fanaroff-Riley Class radio galaxy. It is hosted by a large featureless elliptical galaxy with a bright central core.

There is a dust lane located on the southwest side of the galaxy based on imaging made by Hubble Space Telescope, being visible downwards to the inner region. This dust lane is split into two separate parts; one near the nucleus and the other extending outwards from the nucleus towards the northwest direction with a dust emission path at its end. There is clearly a disky isophotal structure present in the galaxy with faint thin tendrils.

The radio source of 3C 357 is found to be a double, orientating by nearly east to west direction. When imaged with a radio map taken by Very Large Array (VLA) at 4.86 GHz, the source displays a visible radio core and multiple hotspots. A jet is seen located within the northwest radio lobe, pointing towards the direction of a compact hotspot. At 1.4 GHz, the map shows evidence of a large-scale structure. Snapshots with Chandra X-ray Observatory found there is radio emission from the core with no traces of any radiation around it or being associated with its hotspots.

Although the nucleus of the galaxy is depolarized, a study showed there are four vectors in the emission region, found perpendicular towards the radius indicating the polarized light has a scattering origin. In 2021, extended X-ray emission was found detected around the galaxy, mainly along the radio axis.
