= 3C 432 =

Quasar in the constellation Pegasus

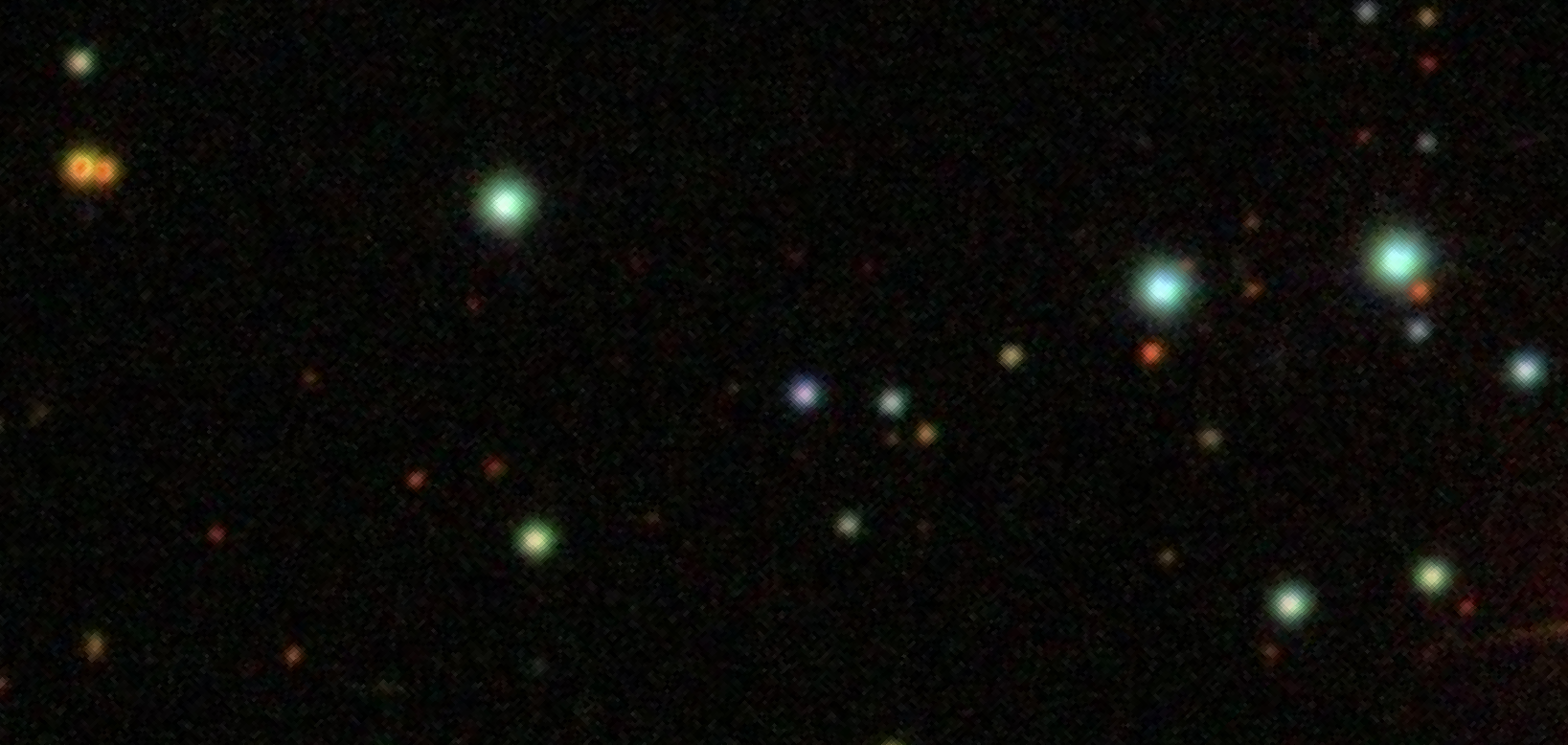
- The quasar 3C 432.

Observation data (J2000.0 epoch)
- Constellation: Pegasus
- Right ascension: 21^{h} 22^{m} 46.319^{s}
- Declination: +17° 04′ 37.983″
- Redshift: 1.785000
- Heliocentric radial velocity: 535,130 km/s
- Distance: 9.678 Gly
- Apparent magnitude (V): 17.96
- Apparent magnitude (B): 18.18

Characteristics
- Type: RL1

Other designations
- 4C +16.72, PKS 2120+16, LEDA 2817730, OX +134.2, NRAO 0656, TXS 2120+168, IERS B2120+168

3C 432 is a quasar located in the constellation of Pegasus. It has a redshift of (z) 1.785 and it was first discovered in 1966 during the Third Cambridge Catalogue of Radio Sources survey. This is a powerful radio-loud object classified as a lobe-dominated quasar, with a Type II Fanaroff Riley class source.

== Description ==
The source of 3C 432 is small. When observed with Very Large Array radio imaging, it is made up of bright radio lobes which are placed asymmetrically around its central feature, interpreted as the radio core. There are two detected hot spots; one located on the lobe extreme edge and the other located towards the lobe inner edges. A jet displaying an elongated jet knot, is found pointing towards the direction of the brightest hot spot region. This jet is estimated to have an extension of 155 kiloparsecs. On the western edge of its southeast lobe, there is a ring feature girding the jet's path with an absence of a counter-jet. Strong polarization has been found in the southeast lobe's west side, mainly between 30% and 50%, while the southeast hot spot and the jet shows no traces of polarization. In both the core and lobes, radio emission are present.

The host galaxy of 3C 432 is compact. Based on imaging by Hubble Space Telescope, it is found to have an orientation of 45° along its position angle with a diameter of 1.2 fractional arcseconds. There is also a detection of a secondary radio emission plume that has a position angle of 135°. In additional, the host galaxy is experiencing a starburst with its total star formation rate being 420 M_{☉} per year. It is also undergoing a galaxy merger.

Observations made using the AGN radio-to-X-ray spectral energy distribution model fitting code, found the torus emission of the accretion disk of 3C 432, has a best fit by combining clumps and a homogenous disk that is described having a high opacity, with a viewing inclination angle of 33°. A central supermassive black hole mass of 9.7^{2} M_{☉} was also calculated for the quasar, with its broad-line luminosity estimating to be 45.57 L_{BLR}.
