= 3C 15 =

Radio galaxy in the constellation Cetus

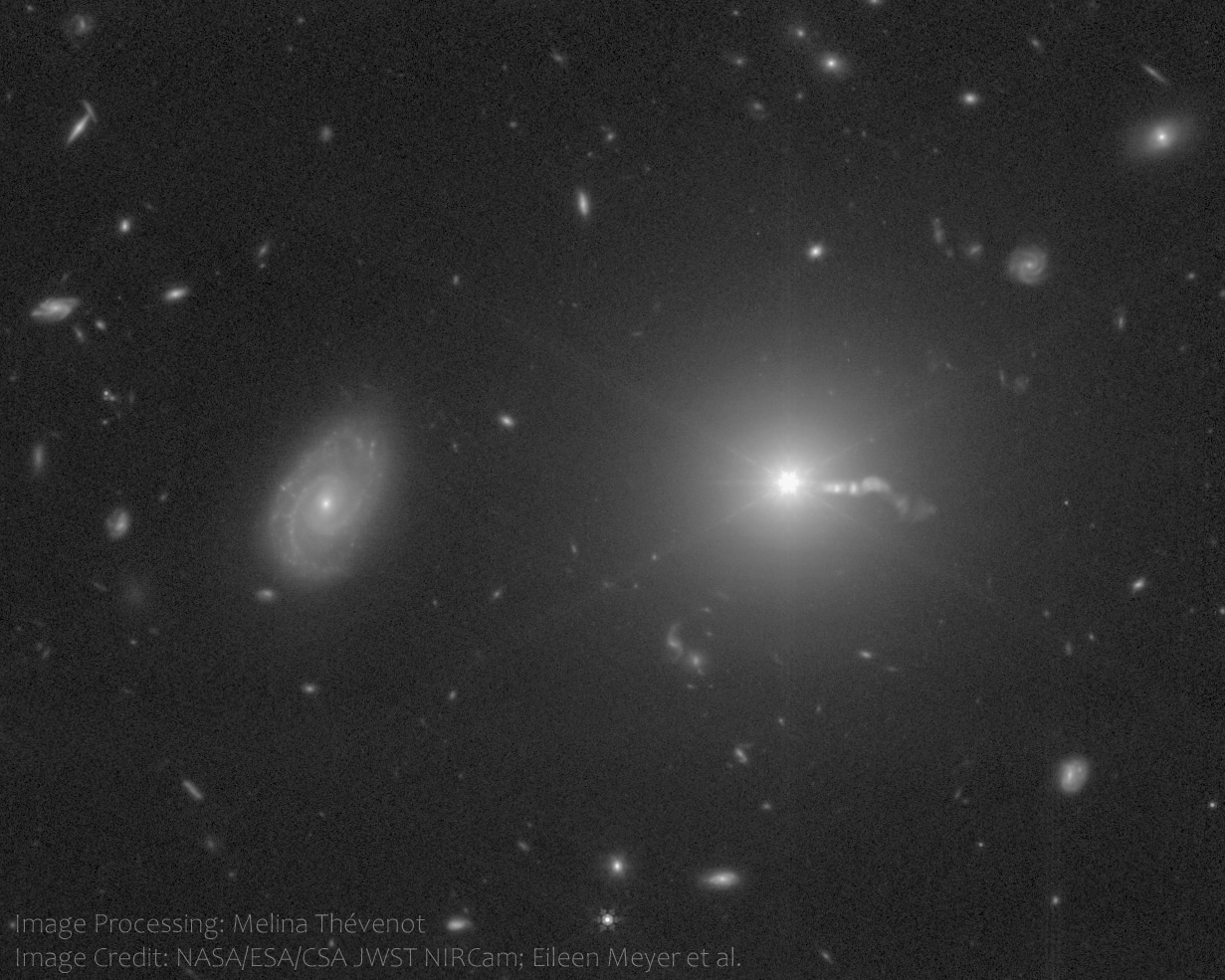
- James Webb Space Telescope image of 3C 15 (right) and the galaxy LEDA 1125302 (spiral galaxy on the left)

Observation data (J2000 epoch)
- Constellation: Cetus
- Right ascension: 00^{h} 37^{m} 04.10^{s}
- Declination: −01° 09′ 08.27″
- Redshift: 0.073678
- Heliocentric radial velocity: 22,088 ± 2 km/s
- Distance: 1,066.7 ± 74.7 Mly (327.04 ± 22.89 Mpc)
- Apparent magnitude (V): 15.53

Characteristics
- Type: E1;BrClG NLRG
- Size: ~262,000 ly (80.3 kpc) (estimated)

Other designations
- CTA 003, PGC 2213, 6dF J0037041-010908, 4C -01.03, DA 014, G4Jy 0067, NRAO 0030, PKS 0034-01, OB -057

3C 15 is a Fanaroff-Riley Class Type I radio galaxy located in the constellation of Cetus. The redshift of the galaxy is (z) 0.073 and it was initially discovered in the Third Cambridge Catalogue of Radio Sources by A.S. Bennett in 1962. This galaxy is known to contain an optical radio jet.

== Description ==
3C 15 is found to be hosted by a regular undisturbed elliptical galaxy. The circumnuclear region of the galaxy is described as having a disturbed appearance with spiral arm ridges of radio emission features found to be mainly arranged in a fanlike position around the central nucleus. The first ridge feature is described as narrow with a position angle of around 30°. The second ridge feature is brighter with diffused and wrapped parts located on the outer regions. The third ridge feature is fainter and more diffused than the other two ridge features with an origin point from the western side. The nucleus of the galaxy shows a prominent dust lane depicted with a reddened appearance.

Imaging made by Very Large Array (VLA) has detected a radio jet on one side of the galaxy. There are also two radio lobes present with one of them depicted as more brighter and has a warm spot feature. The radio core remains unresolved based on VLA imaging. Evidence also found the jet is found to extend five kiloparsecs from the position of the nucleus with the position angle being orientated at -30°. A further study also found the emission originating from the jet, is divided into four knot regions, of which only two of the regions display signs of X-ray emission. There are also detections of polarization along the outer edges of the knot complexes and also about 35-40% on the ends of a jet knot. Imaging made by Chandra X-ray Observatory detected an X-ray jet counterpart in November 2003.

An extended emission line region has been found in 3C 15, but the emission lines only have slight extended features and mainly confined within a central region of four kiloparsecs. However the velocity dispersion is larger on the path of the radio axis with velocities of 800 kilometers per seconds. Lunar occultations have also been detected in 1967, with at least four components located on a straight line with a position angle of 160°.
