= 3C 452 =

Galaxy in the constellation Lacerta

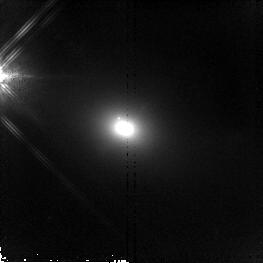

Observation data (J2000 epoch)
- Constellation: Lacerta
- Right ascension: 22^{h} 45^{m} 48.787^{s}
- Declination: +39° 41′ 15.36″
- Redshift: 0.0815
- Distance: 323 megaparsecs (1,050 Mly) h^{−1}_{0.73}
- Apparent magnitude (V): 16.56

Characteristics
- Type: Sy2, Rad, AGN, G, X, QSO; G, FR II, Sy 2
- Apparent size (V): 0.380' × 0.251'
- Notable features: Radio galaxy

Other designations
- DA 584, LEDA 69671, 3C 452, 4C 39.71, QSO B2243+394

3C 452 is an elliptical galaxy about 1.2 billion light years away located in the constellation Lacerta. 3C 452 is a Seyfert galaxy and a Fanaroff–Riley class 2 radio galaxy, with the radiolobes extending for about 5 arcminutes, which at the distance of 3C 452 corresponds to about 450 kiloparsecs. Fainter radio lobes extend farther away, at megaparsec scales, probably created during a former period of elevated nuclear activity. Diffuse X-ray emission has been detected in the radio lobes.

== Gallery ==
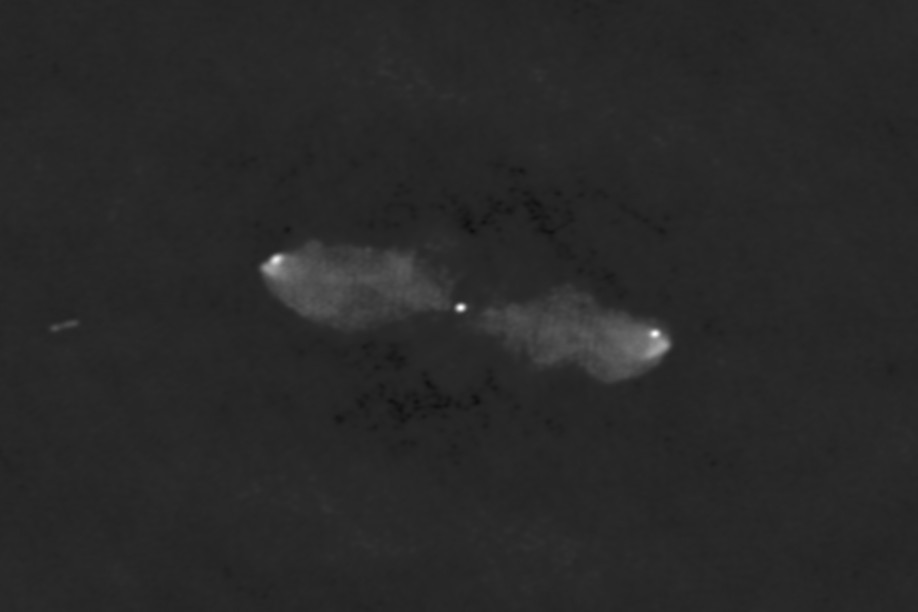
3C 452 in radiowaves by Very Large Array
