= 3C 132 =

Radio galaxy in the constellation of Taurus

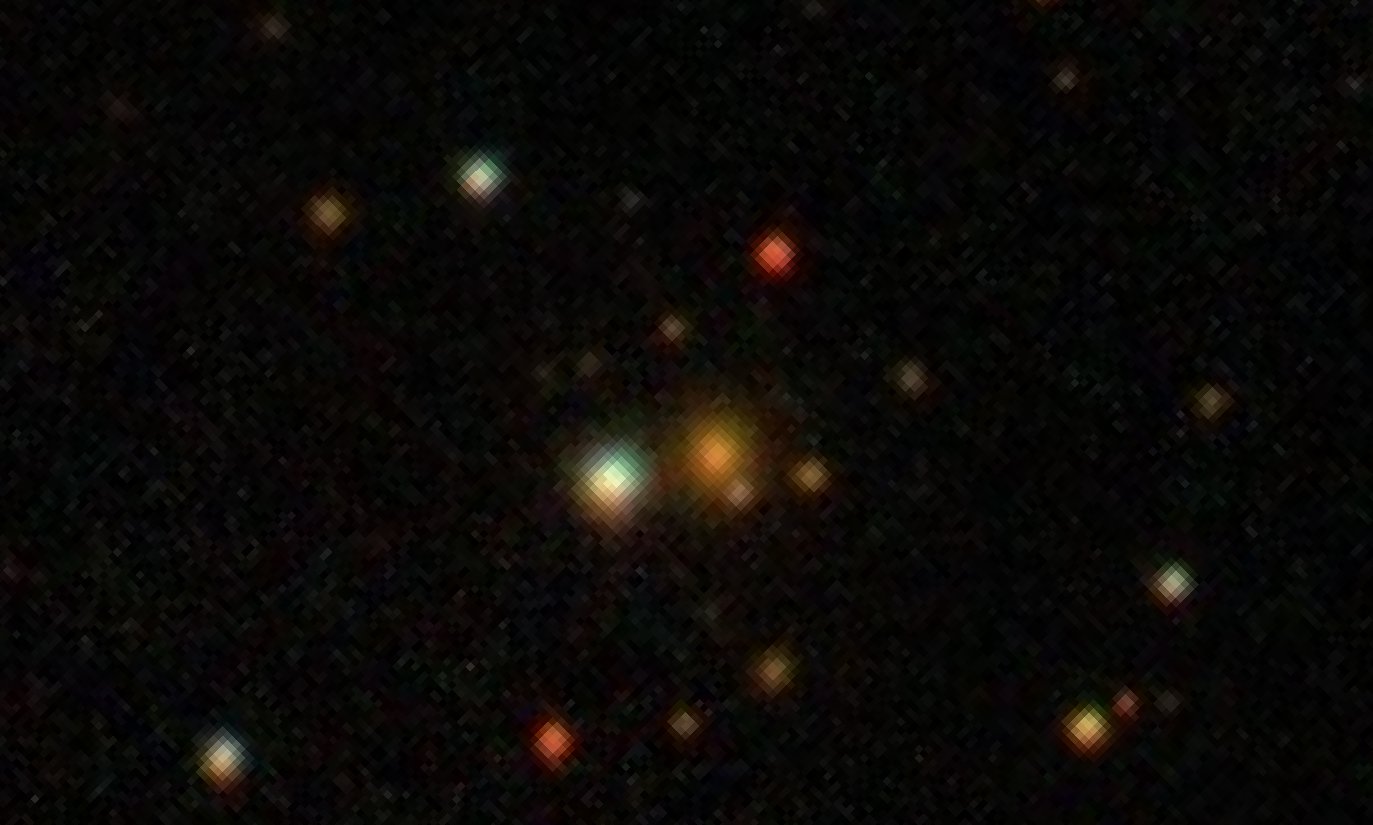
- SDSS image of 3C 132

Observation data (J2000.0 epoch)
- Constellation: Taurus
- Right ascension: 04^{h} 56^{m} 43.01^{s}
- Declination: +22° 49′ 22.95″
- Redshift: 0.214000
- Heliocentric radial velocity: 64,156 km/s
- Distance: 2.661 Gly
- Apparent magnitude (B): 18.5

Characteristics
- Type: Radio galaxy LEG
- Size: ~344,000 ly (105.46 kpc) (estimated)

Other designations
- 4C +22.11, PKS 0453+22, LEDA 2817548, B2 0453+22, 2MASX J04564292+2249230, NRAO 0198, NVSS J045643+224922, Cul 0453+227, G4Jy 0511

3C 132 is a radio galaxy located in the constellation of Taurus. The redshift of the galaxy is (z) 0.214 and it was first discovered in the Third Cambridge Catalogue of Radio Sources survey in 1962. The source of the galaxy is known to display evidence of lunar occultations.

== Description ==
3C 132 is classified as a Fanaroff-Riley class Type 2 low-excitation radio galaxy. The host galaxy is an elliptical galaxy with a smooth and elongated appearance, but is also described as an interacting irregular galaxy The galaxy is also surrounded by several companions forming a packed group, suggesting it also resides inside a galaxy cluster. A face-on disk is found in the galaxy described to have an elliptical isotphotal morphology. Imaging made by Hubble Space Telescope (HST) found a bright central nucleus. This nucleus is described as being surrounded by faint diffused radio emission.

The radio source of the galaxy is a classical double, with two components having a flux ratio of 1.6 ± 0.3. When observed at high resolutions with the Very Large Array (VLA) it has hotspot regions protruding in a bottle-neck fashion, with brightening observed in its radio lobe located on the eastern side, just along the southern edge. The hotspot on the western side is 800 parsecs in extent .while the eastern one is estimated to be 2 kiloparsecs. A curved feature interpreted as backflow is leaving the location of the western hotspot towards the southeast. Upon reaching seven kiloparsecs from the hotspot, a bend is observed in the feature before subsequently ending inside a region of diffused medium. There is also a radio bridge present in the source, perpendicular towards its axis.

A study in 2014 showed the edge-brightened lobes of the galaxy on the southwest and northwestern sides have the same brightness. Upon observation, the lobes are shown flaring towards the direction of the core. A knot feature described as faint is located inside the southeastern lobe, apparently bridging a delineated section and a diffused region.
