= 4C 20.04A =

Radio galaxy in the constellation of Pisces

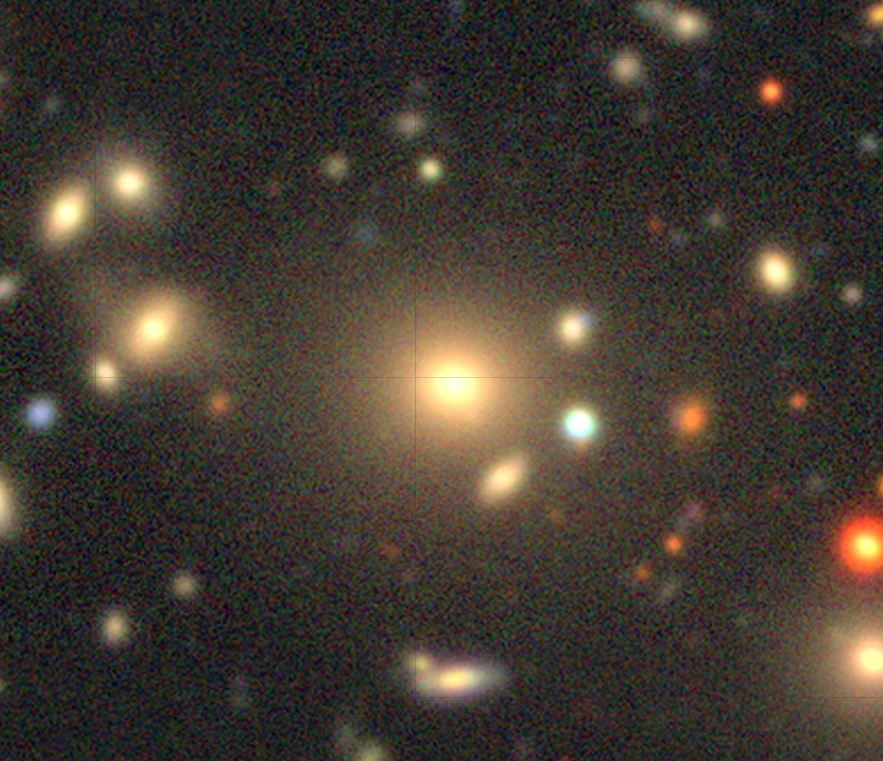
- 4C 20.04A imaged by DESI Legacy Surveys

Observation data (J2000.0 epoch)
- Constellation: Pisces
- Right ascension: 00^{h} 46^{m} 29.33^{s}
- Declination: +20° 28′ 04.92″
- Redshift: 0.103200
- Heliocentric radial velocity: 30,939 kms/ ± 5
- Distance: 1.372 Gly
- Group or cluster: Abell 98
- Apparent magnitude (V): 16.5

Characteristics
- Type: E
- Size: ~442,000 ly (135.6 kpc) (estimated)

Other designations
- 0043+201, 3C 21, 4C +20.04, Cul 0043+201, NRAO 0039, PGC 2715, PKS 0043+20, RX J0046.5+2027 LEDA 1628204

4C 20.04A or simply known as 4C 20.04, is a radio galaxy located in the constellation of Pisces. The redshift of the galaxy is (z) 0.103 and it was first discovered as an astronomical radio source by astronomers in 1959. This object is known to contain a wide-angle tailed (WAT) source and is located inside the central subcluster region called Abell 98S, which in turn makes up the galaxy cluster, Abell 98.

== Description ==
4C 20.04A is classified as a radio galaxy with Fanaroff-Riley Type I classification. It has a steep radio spectrum of low frequency. When observed it is found to made up of two separate sources which are around eight arcminutes from each other. Although the first source was not resolved, the other source has a double structure, with the galaxy lying in the middle of two components. A deeper observation found there is a radio core of flat spectrum associated with the galaxy, with a presence of radio lobes described to have a symmetrical appearance, further resolved into substructures. The core is estimated to have a radio power of around 2.2 × 10^{23} W Hz^{−1}. The total flux of the core is 12.3 ± 0.04 mJy.

Radio imaging made with Very Large Array (VLA) discovered the source has a straight appearance. The radio jets are also depicted to be lengthy without any bending angles, with the northern jet have an extent of around 30 arcseconds while the southern jet on the other hand, is 40 arcseconds in extent. The total jet power is 9.4 × 10^{22} W Hz^{−1}.

Further evidence also showed the hotspot features do contain some fractional polarization. The hotspot on the northern side is around 40% while the hotspot on the southern side is between 20% and 30%. The southern lobe of the structure is featureless but not smooth, with polarization levels increasing towards the tail feature end. A gradual spectrum steeping of the tails is noted, with a spectral index value of -0.5 near the core position, decreasing to -0.2 at the tail edges. There is evidence the northern lobe of this galaxy is evacuating an X-ray cavity thus creating a deficit of surface brightness. A region of excessive surface brightness can be seen east direction from the galaxy's position.
