= 3C 213.1 =

Seyfert type 2 galaxy in the constellation Cancer

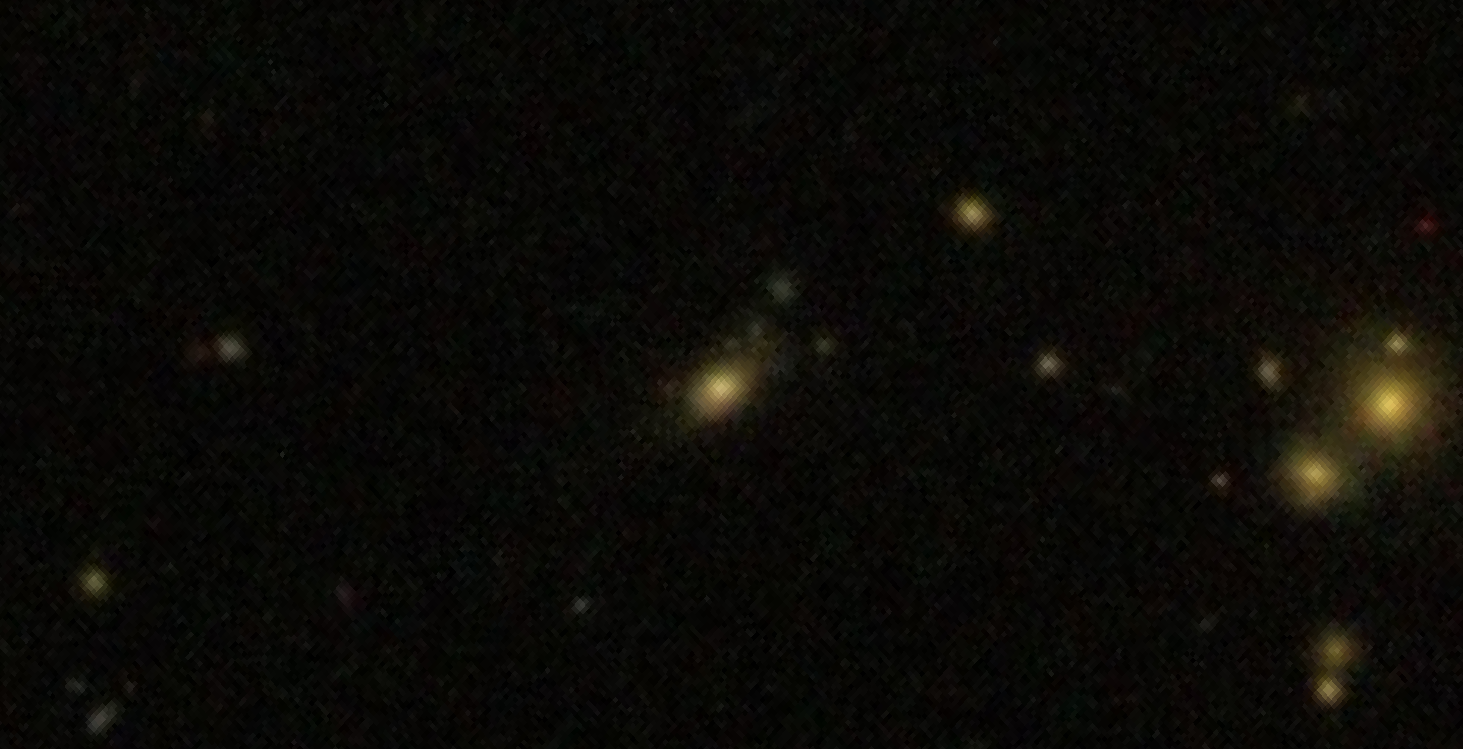
- SDSS image of 3C 213.1

Observation data (J2000.0 epoch)
- Constellation: Cancer
- Right ascension: 09^{h} 01^{m} 05.25^{s}
- Declination: +29° 01′ 47.11″
- Redshift: 0.194045
- Heliocentric radial velocity: 58,173 km/s
- Distance: 2.450 Gly
- Apparent magnitude (V): 18.08
- Apparent magnitude (B): 18.84

Characteristics
- Type: Radio galaxy LEG, CSS
- Size: ~158,000 ly (48.4 kpc) (estimated)

Other designations
- 4C +29.33, LEDA 139159, 2MASS J09010523+2901476, SDSS J090105.26+290146.9, OJ +297, CTD 059, DA 259, NRAO 0312, TXS 0858+292, CoNFIG 039, NVSS J090105+290145

3C 213.1 is an active Seyfert type 2 galaxy located in the constellation of Cancer. The redshift of the object is (z) 0.194 and it was first discovered in the Third Cambridge Catalogue of Radio Sources survey in 1962. Astronomers would also identify it in December 1966 during the Fourth Cambridge Survey, where they designated it as 4C 29.33. The galaxy contains a compact steep spectrum (CSS) source.

== Description ==
3C 213.1 is classified as a Fanaroff-Riley Class Type II radio galaxy. The host is classified as an elliptical with evidence of either sharp edges or shell structures. Imaging with the Hubble Space Telescope (HST) shows an extension located in a southeast direction from the galaxy. The galaxy also shows the presence of a bulge component with an absolute magnitude of -25.01.

A study published in 2008 found no evidence of very young stellar populations, but shows a reddened intermediate stellar population, mostly made up of stars aged 1.3 billion years. It is also plausible 3C 213.1 might have gone through a galaxy merger in the past, based on the presence of a disturbed outer envelope caused by tidal interactions.

The source of 3C 213.1 is compact. When observed at 102 MHz frequencies, it is found to have two large regions of diffused emission. with the source's total extent being 30 arcseconds. In the northern component, there are three compact features, with the southern one being the most polarized and the strongest. Observations with MERLIN show a bright central component which holds around 41% of the flux density. Hotspots located in the southern and northern directions are clearly detected in the source with radio emission present over a large area southeast. The supermassive black hole mass of 3C 213.1 has been found to be in a range of 9.1 × 10^{6} M_{☉}. Detections of H I absorption have been reported in the galaxy.
