= 3C 191 =

Quasar located in the constellation Cancer

Observation data (Epoch J2000)
- Constellation: Cancer
- Right ascension: 08^{h} 04^{m} 47.9625^{s}
- Declination: +10° 15′ 23.781″
- Redshift: 1.956000
- Distance: 5,038 megaparsecs (1.643×10^{10} ly) h^{−1}_{0.73}
- Type: Rad, QSO, X, G QSO, FR II
- Apparent magnitude (V): 18.40

Other designations
- LEDA 2817585, 4C +10.25, QSO B0802+10

3C 191 is a quasar located in the constellation Cancer. It is located at redshift z = 1.95 and is hosted by an elliptical galaxy. The quasar contains a radio jet known to contain a high rotation measure with a thin shell configuration created in a form of wind inside the central regions.

According to studies, the quasar is producing outflow winds that extend farther than 5 kiloparsecs from the center of the galaxy and carry energy at a rate of 5.5 × 10^{42} ergs s^{−1}. The elliptical host of 3C 191, is said to have a gas density of ~ 0.17 cm^{−3} with a magnetic field measuring ~ 2.5 × 10^{−3} μG. In additional, 3C 191 contains a number of absorption lines.
