= 3C 323.1 =

Quasar in the constellation of Serpens

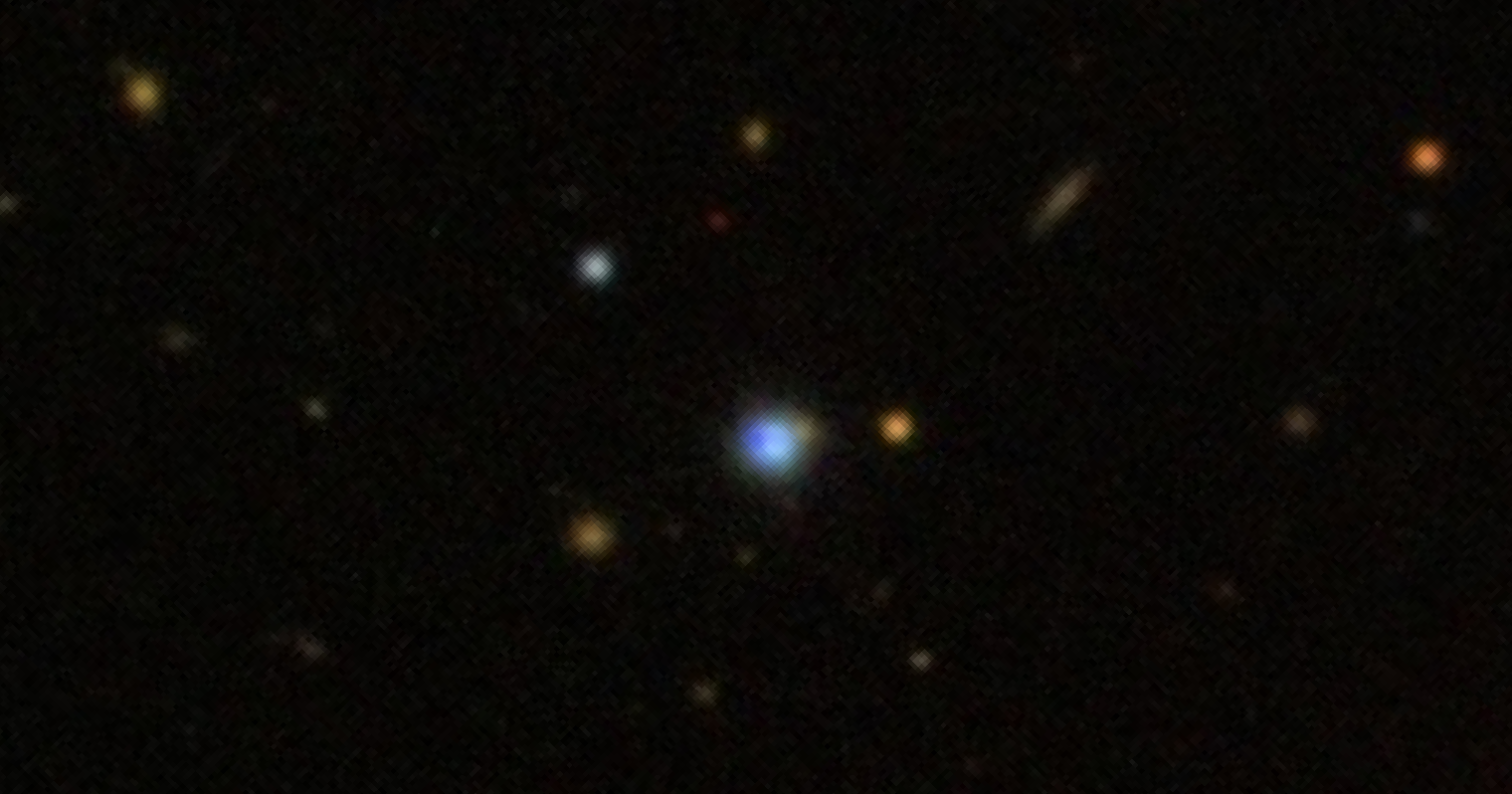
- SDSS image of 3C 323.1.

Observation data (J2000.0 epoch)
- Constellation: Serpens
- Right ascension: 15^{h} 47^{m} 43.53^{s}
- Declination: +20° 52′ 16.61″
- Redshift: 0.264300
- Heliocentric radial velocity: 79,235 km/s
- Distance: 3.187 Gly
- Apparent magnitude (V): 16.69
- Apparent magnitude (B): 16.80

Characteristics
- Type: RLQ; AGN BLO
- Size: 123.03 kiloparsecs (401,300 light-years) (diameter; 2MASS K-band total isophote)

Other designations
- 4C +21.45, 2MASX J15474353+2052167, PKS 1545+21, PG 1545+210, LEDA 2819699, RBS 1530, 7C 1545+2101, OR +276, NRAO 483, CoNFIG 229

3C 323.1 known as PG 1545+210, is a quasar located in the constellation of Serpens. The redshift of the object is (z) 0.264 based on its absorption line features and it was first discovered as an astronomical radio source from the Third Cambridge Survey of Radio Sources in May 1966. It is described as radio-loud.

== Description ==
3C 323.1 is a nearby radio-loud quasar. Its host is a reddened low-surface brightness elliptical galaxy according to Hubble Space Telescope imaging with nearby galaxy companion located seven kiloparsecs from it. The nucleus of the galaxy is described as luminous with diffraction spikes produced through near-infrared imaging. Further evidence also showed the quasar is a member of a rich compact galaxy cluster, Zw CL 1545.1+2104; being located on the outskirts from it.

The spectrum of 3C 323.1 displays strong Balmer emission lines, being centered together along with narrow forbidden lines representing of doubly ionized oxygen and neon ions. Optical spectroscopy imaging also showed there is another companion 2.1 arcseconds away, interpreted as a nucleus remnant of a galaxy, about to fully merge with the quasar host galaxy. There is also an extended emission line region (EELR) present in 3C 323.1 in southeast to west direction across its core with a further extension out by 21 kiloparsecs towards east at the position angle of 105° and in a perpendicular direction to the axis of its radio source by 10 kiloparsecs.

The radio source of 3C 323.1 is found as a triple with a bright northeastern radio component located closer to the quasar and an off-axis tail located in another component. Other observations made with Chandra X-ray Observatory, found the morphology of the source is classified as Fanaroff-Riley class Type 2 with absence of hotspots and signs of diffused radio emission round the bright nucleus detected in X-rays. Very Large Array detected an asymmetrical source with a northeastern radio lobe positioned near to its radio core compared to the southwestern radio lobe. A jet is seen entering the lobe on the southern side.

3C 323.1 shows strong evidence of optical photometric and polarimetric variability. Based on observations, most of the polarization of the object is mainly confined within a continuum emission region with its flux spectra displaying signs of a broad absorption feature described timely-variable in Balmer continuum. Additionally, there is also weak flux variability over a four to six time-scale with extreme correlated variability flux in V-band frequencies. A supermassive black hole mass of 9.29 M_{☉} has been calculated for the quasar.
