= 3C 449 =

Radio galaxy in the constellation Lacerta

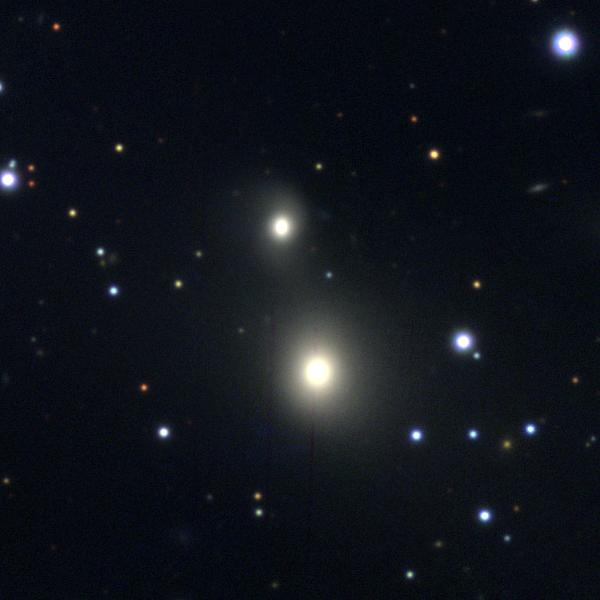

Observation data (J2000 epoch)
- Constellation: Lacerta
- Right ascension: 22^{h} 31^{m} 20.55^{s}
- Declination: +39° 21′ 29.6″
- Redshift: 0.01711
- Distance: 213 Mly
- Apparent magnitude (V): 12.35

Characteristics
- Type: E/S0
- Apparent size (V): 1.05′×0.74′

Other designations
- UGC 12064, 3C 449, 4C 39.69, LEDA 69055, B2229+390

3C 449 is a low-redshift (z = 0.017) Fanaroff and Riley class I radio galaxy. It is thought to contain a highly warped circumnuclear disk surrounding the central active galactic nucleus (AGN). The name signifies that it was the 449th object (ordered by right ascension) of the Third Cambridge Catalog of Radio Sources (3C), published in 1959.

When observed by the Very Large Array, the galaxy features two symmetrical radio jets that end up in lobes and an unresolved core. The jets are relativistic near the core, but their speed is greatly reduced at about 10 arcseconds (which corresponds to about 5 kiloparsecs at the distance of the galaxy) from the core. The lobes appear complex, with plumes and wiggles. The north lobe is elongated while the end of the south lobe is round. The total apparent size of the radio features is about 30 arcminutes. Both lobes are leaning towards the west, indicating they are pushed that way by external gas which was formed during a galaxy merger the last 1.3 – 1.6 billion years.

3C 449 is the most prominent member of the Zwicky 2231.2+3732 galaxy cluster. The halo of 3C 449 is connected via a bridge with another galaxy located 37 arcseconds to the north.

== Images ==
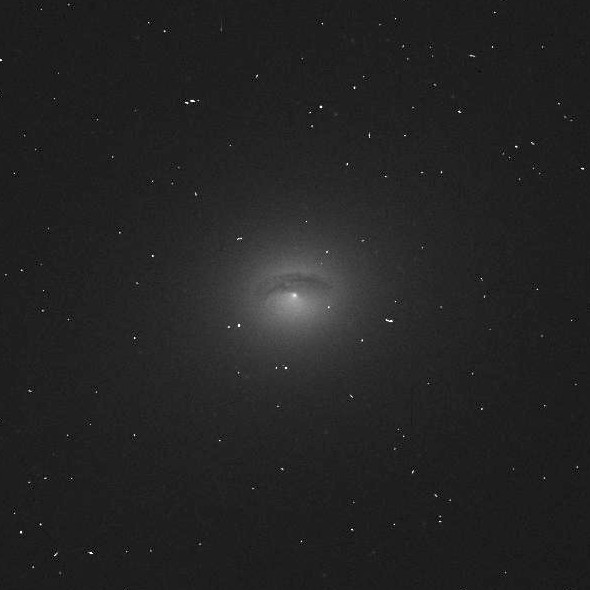
Close up of 3C 449 by the Hubble Space Telescope

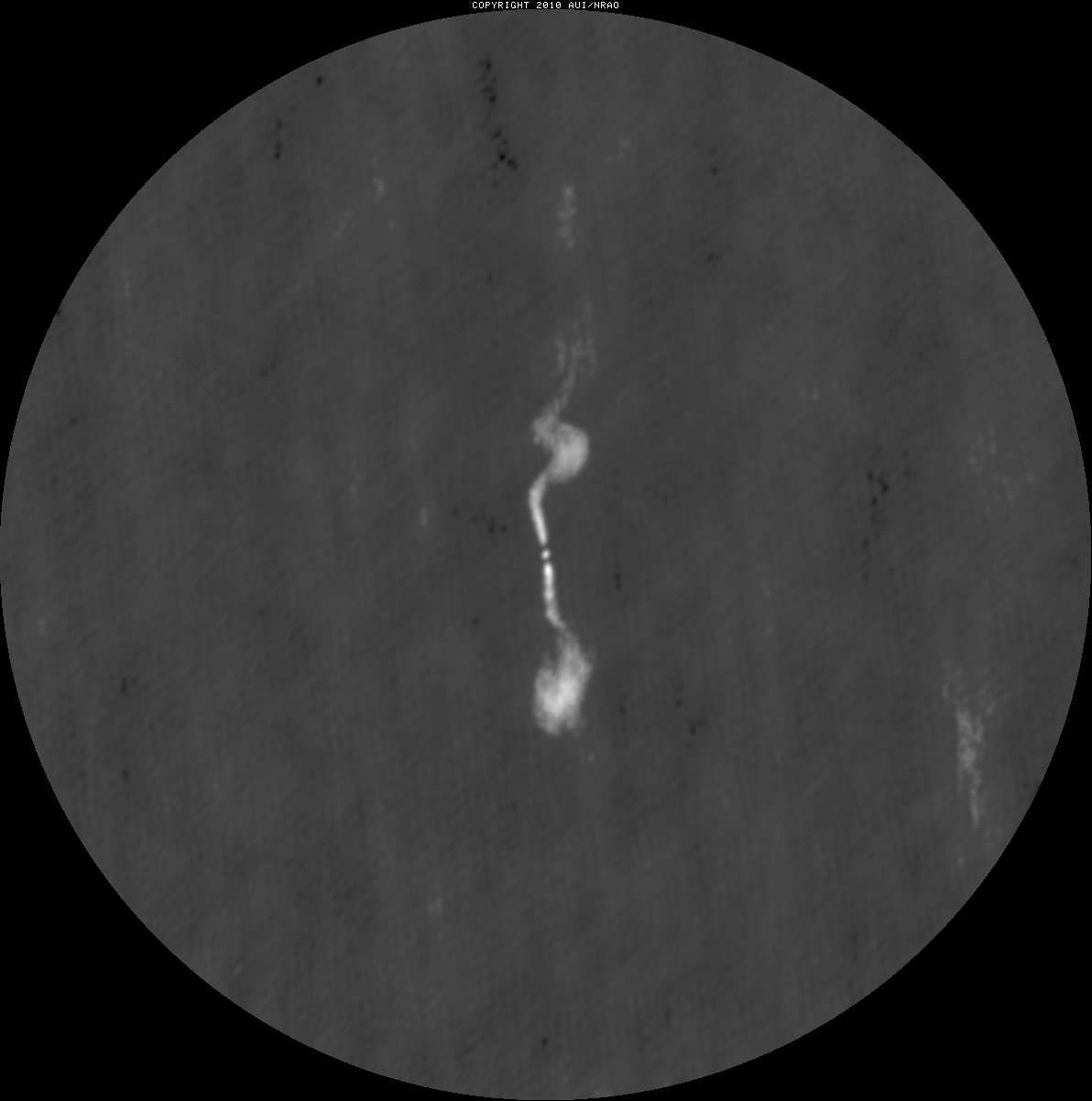
3C 449 in radiowaves by the NRAO VLA Archive Survey
