= 3C 343.1 =

Radio galaxy in the constellation Draco

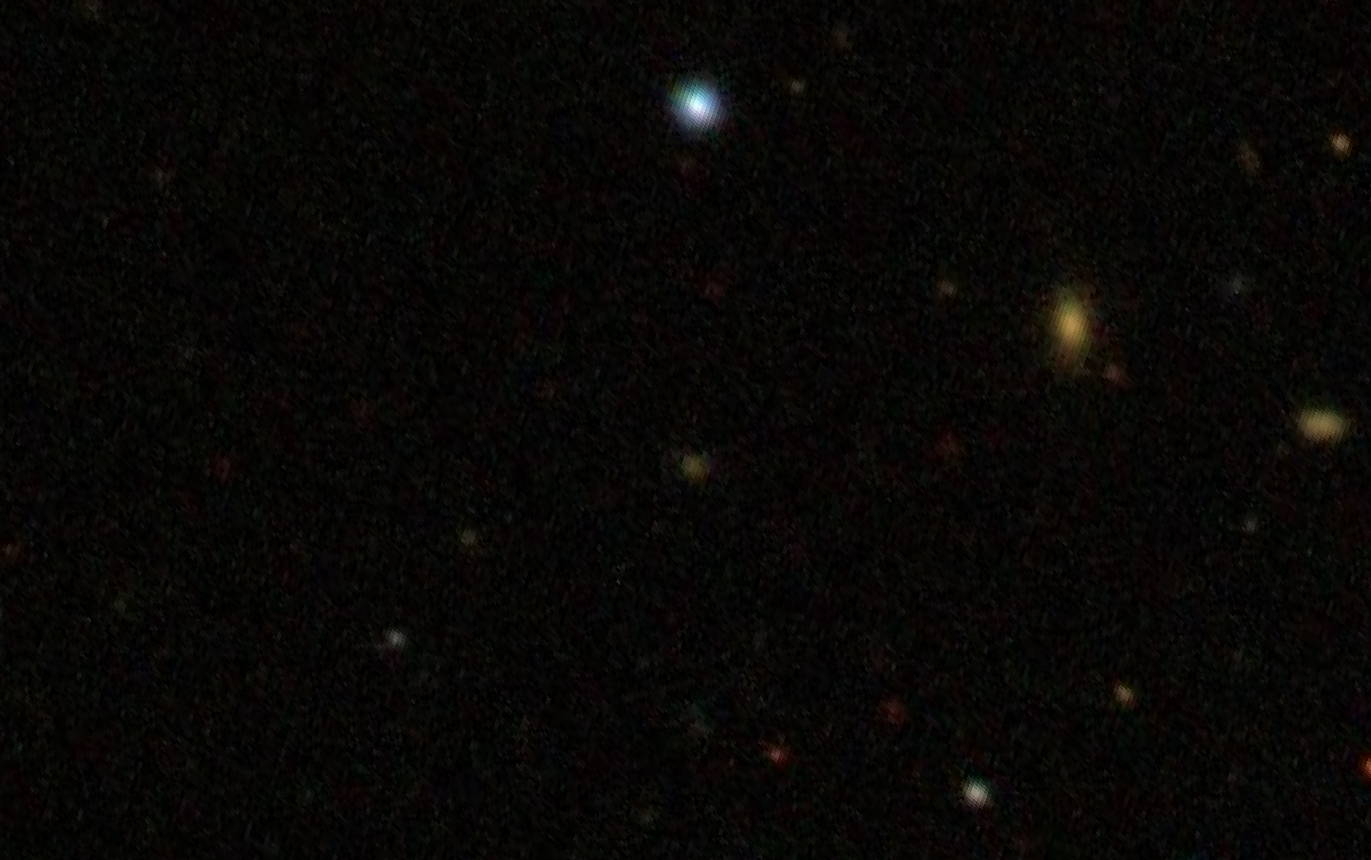
- SDSS image of 3C 343.1

Observation data (J2000.0 epoch)
- Constellation: Draco
- Right ascension: 16^{h} 38^{m} 28.22^{s}
- Declination: +62° 34′ 44.31″
- Redshift: 0.752380
- Heliocentric radial velocity: 225,558 km/s
- Distance: 6.777 Gly
- Apparent magnitude (V): 20.7

Characteristics
- Type: NLRG Sy2

Other designations
- LEDA 2821600, 4C +62.27, NVSS J163828+623443, 87GB 163755.4+624035, 7C 1637+6240, 8C 1637+626, DA 419, NRAO 0511, CoNFIG 258, VIPS 1002, ICRF J163828.2+623444

3C 343.1 is a radio galaxy located in the constellation of Draco. The redshift of the object is (z) 0.752 and it was first recorded in the Third Cambridge Catalogue of Radio Sources survey in 1966. It is also a quasar, pairing up with a foreground galaxy located at (z) 0.344, and is classified as a compact steep spectrum source (CSS).

== Description ==
The host galaxy of 3C 343.1 has a blue appearance mainly due to the presence of an early-type stellar population or a recent wave of star formation. The total star formation rate of the galaxy is estimated to be 1.7^{+0.5}_{-0.4} × 10^{11} M_{☉}, with the host infrared luminosity estimated to be 2.9^{+0.6}_{-0.5} × 10^{11} L_{☉}. It has a supermassive black hole mass of 28.7 × 10^{7} M_{☉}. The nucleus of the galaxy has been categorized as compact.

3C 343.1 has a compact source. When observed with the Very Large Array (VLA), the source has an elongated appearance in the position angle of 110°, with two clearly resolved components observed on a 15 GHz radio map. An 18 centimeter observation with Very Long Baseline Interferometry (VLBI), showed the source is double with two asymmetrical components displaying high surface brightness profiles. The components also display a steep radio spectrum described as straight. Newer VLBI observations made in 2021 at 327 GHz frequencies found the source displays asymmetric lobes that are separated by around 215 milliarcseconds. No radio core has been discovered, although the components have a flat radio spectrum with observed steepening at 610 MHz. A radio jet is present in the source, with a linear size of 1.57 kiloparsecs.

An observation conducted in 1995, found 3C 343.1 has an emission-line nebula region. The radio emission of the region is extended along the direction of the source for more than five arcseconds. making it possible that this could be classified as an extended emission-line region. A linear feature is seen orientating along the east–west axis based on broad-band images. The nuclear spectrum of the galaxy has been found to show either the presence of weak ionization lines or none at all. Little signs of polarization have also been detected in the galaxy.
