= 3C 215 =

Seyfert galaxy in the constellation Cancer

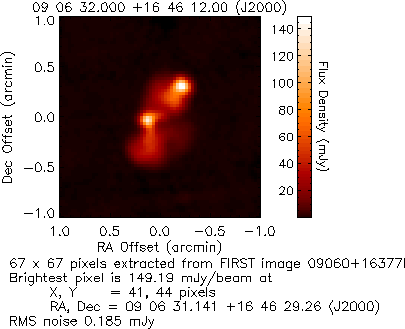

Observation data (Epoch J2000)
- Constellation: Cancer
- Right ascension: 09^{h} 06^{m} 31.86^{s}
- Declination: +16° 46′ 11.9″
- Redshift: 0.411 551; 0.412 100
- Distance: 1,545 megaparsecs (5,040 Mly) h^{−1}_{0.73}
- Type: Sy1, QSO, X, IR, G, blu QSO, FR II, Sy 1.5
- Apparent magnitude (V): 18.27

Other designations
- DB 62, LEDA 2817602, 3C 215, 4C 16.26, QSO B0903+16

3C 215 is a Seyfert galaxy/Quasar located in the constellation Cancer. This is a radio-loud quasar with a jet, hosted in an elliptical galaxy and located inside a galaxy cluster. This object also shows signs of interaction with neighboring galaxy.

3C 215 is also known to have a complex structure. Based on radio imaging, its inner region contains bright emission knots.
