= 3C 309.1 =

Quasar in the constellation Ursa Minor

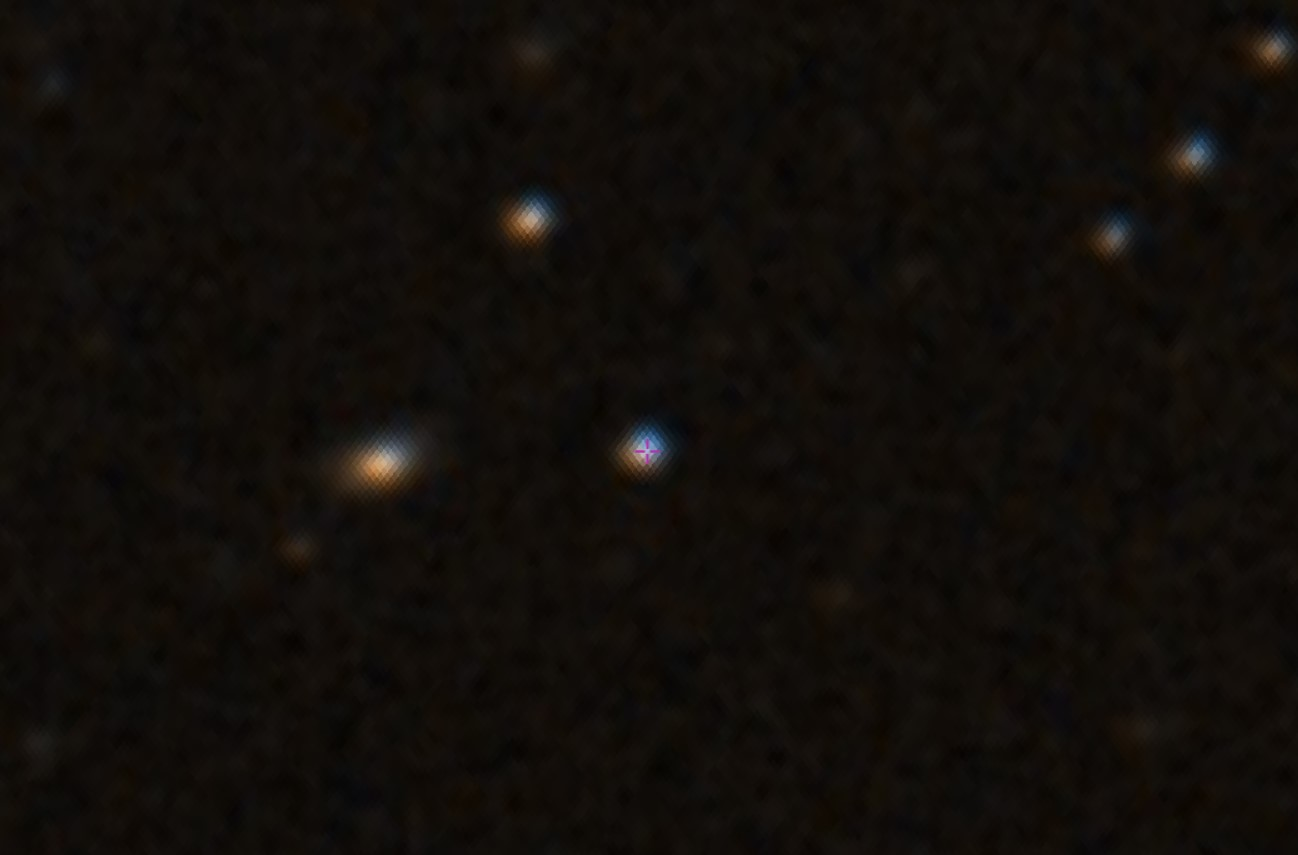
- The quasar 3C 309.1.

Observation data (J2000.0 epoch)
- Constellation: Ursa Minor
- Right ascension: 14^{h} 59^{m} 07.583^{s}
- Declination: +71° 40′ 19.867″
- Redshift: 0.901113
- Heliocentric radial velocity: 270,147 km/s
- Distance: 7.665 Gly
- Apparent magnitude (V): 16.78
- Apparent magnitude (B): 17.24

Characteristics
- Type: CSS

Other designations
- LEDA 2821824, 4C 71.15, WMAP 071, QSO B1458+718, 2E 3367, NRAO 464, 1Jy 1458+718

3C 309.1 is a quasar located in the constellation of Ursa Minor. It has a redshift (z) of 0.90 and was first identified as an astronomical radio source from the Third Cambridge Catalogue of Radio Sources by in 1966. This object contains a compact steep spectrum (CSS) source, and is classified as one of the brightest and largest of its kind.

== Description ==
3C 309.1 has a triple radio structure. It has a radio core found self-absorbed with an extended position angle of 162°±2°. On both sides of the core, there are two relatively extended outer radio lobes having a defined positional angle of 90°.

In sub-arcsecond resolutions, the structure is made up of several components. Three of them are aligned east–west while the others are located along the path of extended emission in a southern direction, clearly detected by two X-ray images. In two of the brightest components, there is polarized emission. However, when viewed at a 5 GHz milliarcsecond (mas) resolution, a bright core is found instead straddled by two other weaker components with a separation of 8.7 kiloparsecs. Sub-milliarcsecond imaging shows the core to be compact with a more extended component located 20 mas to the south.

The jet of 3C 309.1 is one-sided. It is found to be flaring away from the nucleus with a sharp change in brightness, likely caused through various Kelvin–Helmholtz instabilities in confined fluid flow and pressure being exerted in confined medium. In Very Long Baseline Interferometry radio imaging, the jet is shown to extend from the core southwards with a distance of 260 parsecs (60 mas). At eastwards, it bends at 90° before fading rapidly. Furthermore, the jet is extremely polarized.

The host galaxy of 3C 309.1 is a flat elliptical galaxy according to Hubble Space Telescope imaging. It has a major axis orientated along the position angle of 130°. Extensive emission-line gas is also seen surrounding the object at high pressure, with a massive cooling rate exceeding 1000 M_{☉} yr^{−1} implying its host galaxy might have been formed within a Hubble time.
