= 3C 270.1 =

Quasar in the constellation Canes Venatici

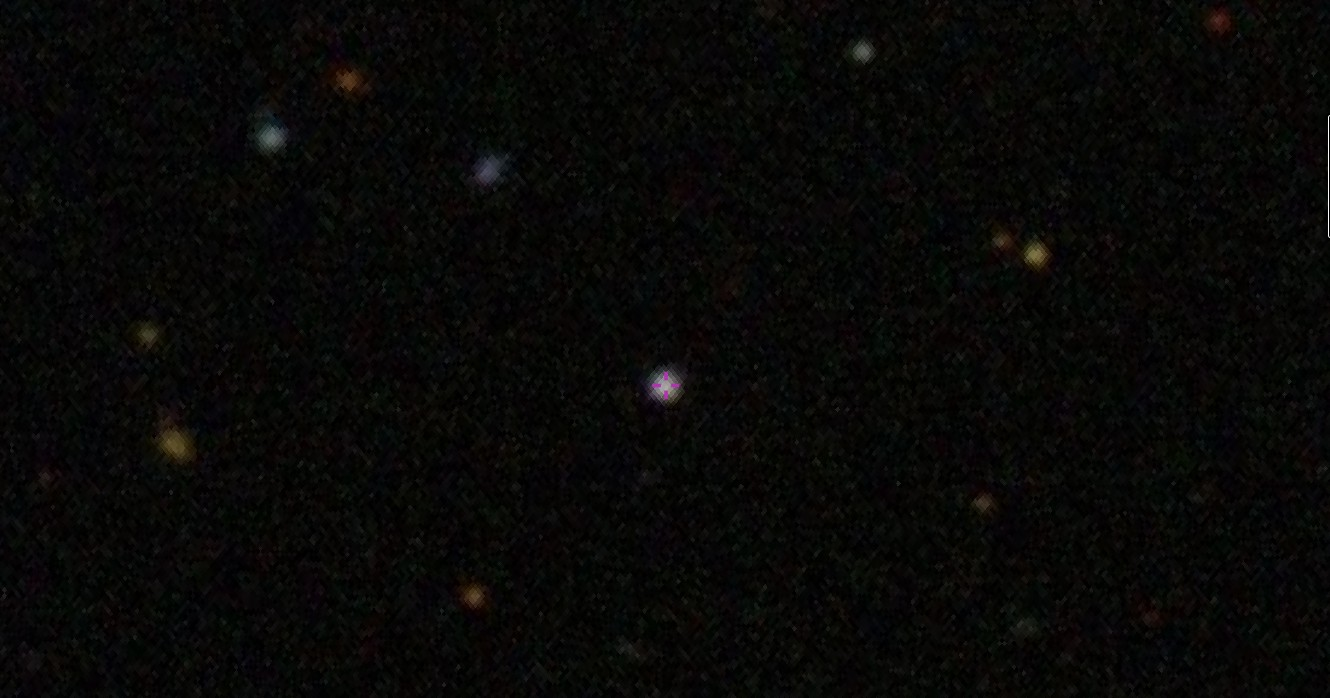
- The quasar 3C 270.1.

Observation data (J2000.0 epoch)
- Constellation: Canes Venatici
- Right ascension: 12^{h} 20^{m} 33.8750^{s}
- Declination: +33° 43′ 12.028″
- Redshift: 1.528731
- Heliocentric radial velocity: 458,302 km/s
- Distance: 9.136 Gly
- Apparent magnitude (V): 18.61
- Apparent magnitude (B): 18.80

Characteristics
- Type: BAL

Other designations
- NRAO 396, LEDA 2820304, DA 320, QSO B1218+939, OHIO N 330, 4C 33.29

3C 270.1 is a radio-loud quasar located in the constellation of Canes Venatici. It has a redshift of (z) 1.528, appearing as a bright unidentified source but also containing one of the most powerful jets. It is classified as being core-dominated with broad absorption lines, making it a broad absorption line quasar (BAL QSO). It is classified as a galaxy merger with a supermassive black hole mass of about 10^{9} M_{☉}, with its host galaxy being orientated by a position angle of 100° in east-west direction.

== Description ==
3C 270.1 is described as either a bend or 'dog-leg' quasar. Its radio structure is made up of two components measuring < 0.3 and 0.6 arcseconds respectively. There is a weak component located in north-west direction, described to have a low-brightness surface based on radio mapping observations at 15 GHz via a 5-kilometer telescope. In addition, it has a powerful radio core resolved as a one-sided core-jet structure when imaged at both 8.4 and 15.4 GHz by Very Long Baseline Array with two co-linear radio lobes; one being offset and the other along the source's axis. A knot is present between the core and southern lobe, indicating a jet. When imaged by very-long-baseline interferometry, the quasar has a faint feature with extensions located in south, north and perpendicular towards the axis of the jet in east direction.

Observations by the Chandra X-ray Observatory found the quasar exhibiting an unabsorbed power-law emission. There is also the presence of extended X-ray emission originating from one or two components located in the double hotspot of the southern radio lobe. But for the northern hotspot, it showed no detections of emission although the south part of the lobe has faint traces of emission but is unassociated.

A further analysis also finds 3C 270.1 has an emission ridge starting from a precursor component of the hotspot before extending towards the south-eastern hotspot peak. This in turn, changes direction which the ridge curves by 90° towards the secondary peak, showing a drop in surface brightness.

In addition, magnesium ion absorbers were detected towards the quasar. These absorption systems lie at redshifts of (z) 1.5004, (z) 0.7423 and (z) 1.5000 respectively. A cluster of red galaxies have also been detected, surrounding the quasar.
