= 3C 395 =

Quasar in the Lyra constellation

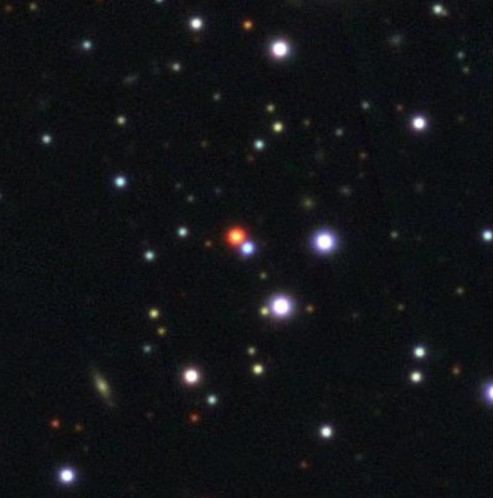
- The quasar 3C 395.

Observation data (J2000.0 epoch)
- Constellation: Lyra
- Right ascension: 19^{h} 02^{m} 55.9389^{s}
- Declination: +31° 59′ 41.702″
- Redshift: 0.635000
- Heliocentric radial velocity: 190,368 km/s
- Distance: 5.746 Gly
- Apparent magnitude (V): 17.5

Characteristics
- Type: Sy 1.5, FSRQ

Other designations
- 4C 31.52, NRAO 592, LEDA 2817714, QSO B1901+319, WMAP 34, 2MASS J19025610+3159439, 2MASSI J1902561+315943, DA 470

3C 395 is a quasar located in the constellation of Lyra. The redshift of the object is (z) 0.635 and it was first documented in a Fourth Cambridge Survey in 1966, designated as 4C 31.52. This is a known quasar with a complex radio structure, classified as a superluminal source.

== Description ==
The structure of the source in 3C 395 is asymmetrical. When imaged on milliarcseconds (mas), it is shown to be resolved into two individual components, each having an equal intensity of 0.8 Jansky but separated by 15.9 mas. Further evidence also pointed one of the components is found have a steep spectrum index, making its symmetry reversed. A newer observation conducted by Very Long Baseline Interferometry (VLBI) in 1994, showed the component is very variable, exhibiting a flux density at 5 GHz between 1978 and 1986. MERLIN observations at 6 centimeters found an extended radio core with a jet-like structure extending both north and north-west.

Centi-arcseconds observations, found there is a presence of an extended structure located at a 102° position angle. There is radio emission present in the structure at the distance of 84 mas. It is also suggested 3C 395 is implied to be a radio galaxy with a double radio source and two superimposed radio lobes.

The jet of 3C 395 as a whole, is straight and extended by 15 mas eastwards. When probed deeply, it has an inner jet component found displaying a sharp bend from the core region, connecting with its compact structure by the emission. This inner jet, described as being one-sided, is also found to be polarized by 1.5% with its average Faraday rotation measure gradient of 300 rad m^{−2}.

A tertiary weak component was discovered between the two components, separated by 1.2 ± 0.3 mas from the core at the position angle of 118°. The component is found to have superluminal motion, moving away at a proper motion of 0.64 ± 0.1 mas yr^{−1}. When observed by VLBI, the superluminal component is heading towards the direction of a stationary knot.

3C 395 is classified as a blazar. Its long-term optical behavior is shown to increase from 17 to 18.4 magnitude between 1980 and around 1985–1986. However, during the first 6 months in 1985, its magnitude declined by 0.9. In February 2021, gamma-ray emission was shown to be emitted from the object, detected by Large Area Telescope.
