= 3C 446 =

Quasar in the constellation Aquarius

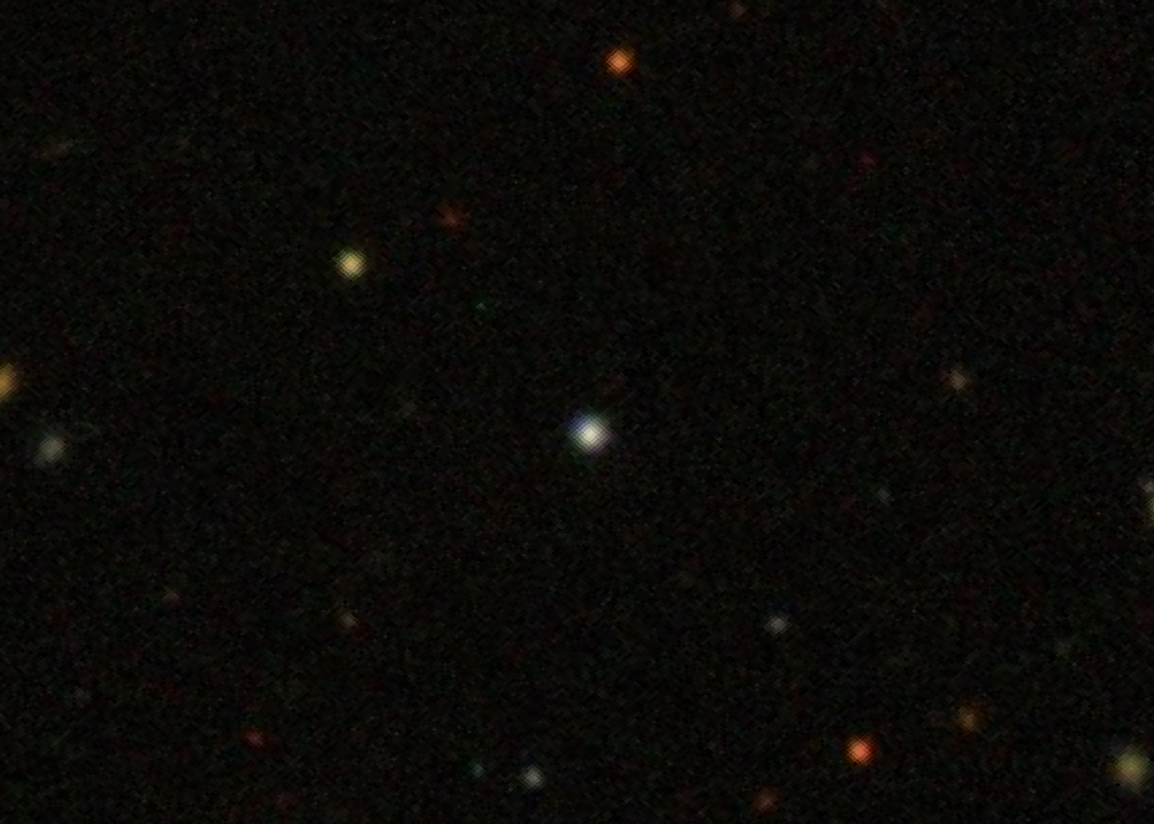
- Quasar 3C 446

Observation data (J2000.0 epoch)
- Constellation: Aquarius
- Right ascension: 22^{h} 25^{m} 47.25^{s}
- Declination: −04° 57′ 01.39″
- Redshift: 1.404000
- Heliocentric radial velocity: 420,909 km/s
- Distance: 9.277 Gly
- Apparent magnitude (B): 18.83
- Absolute magnitude (V): 18.89

Characteristics
- Type: Opt var; HPQ BLLAC

Other designations
- 2MASSI J2225472−045701, 4C −05.92, Cul 2223−05, EPIC 206496452, 6dF J2225473− 045701, LEDA 2817740, G4Jy 1777, LHE 519, NRAO 0687, OY −039, PKS B2223−052, RX J2225.8−0457

3C 446 is a quasar located in the constellation of Aquarius. Its redshift is (z) 1.404, originally believed to be located at (z) 2.065 and it was first discovered by astronomers in 1959. It is also noted as variable since it had a decrease in optical brightness by around 0.5 magnitude when observed in October 1966. It has been referred to as a blazar in addition.

== Description ==
3C 446 is found to have a very compact radio structure. When observed in 1971, it has one unresolved component at 6 centimeters (cm) and a secondary smaller component that is revealed at 18 cm with evidence of a structure. Imaging made with Very Long Baseline Interferometry (VLBI) showed it has a core-jet morphology with the radio core on milliarcsecond scales depicted as having a rising radio spectrum and a slight bent radio jet that is nonlinear before fading into the north–south component. The structure of the jet has also been suggested as twisted, close to the line of sight. Very Large Array (VLA), also described it as a BL Lacertae object with a small angular size. The radio emission of the source is described as being compact and extended. VLBI imaging at 100 GHz frequencies has found the core has an elongated appearance but mainly unresolved, with strong and weak components.

The quasar is classified to be optically violent on the electromagnetic spectrum, making it an optically violent variable quasar (OVV). When observed, it has shown at least one major flare in 1974. A new active phase has been noted in 1983, where it brightened up with its emission lines disappearing. Richard Miller also noted the 3C 446 has three large major outbursts during the past fifteen years. Miller also found it has a reddened appearance when its luminosity increased from V magnitude of 16.04, in mid-November 1979. Radio flux has been shown as varying on longer wavelengths with an L flux decrease of 50 ± 8% between August and December.

The host galaxy of 3C 446 has been suggested to be a merger of a few galaxies based on evidence of tidal features located north and east to west directions. A tidal arm is also found to be a part of the northern component. The nucleus is suggested to have merge with the quasar host galaxy.
