= 3C 356 =

Radio galaxy in the constellation Draco

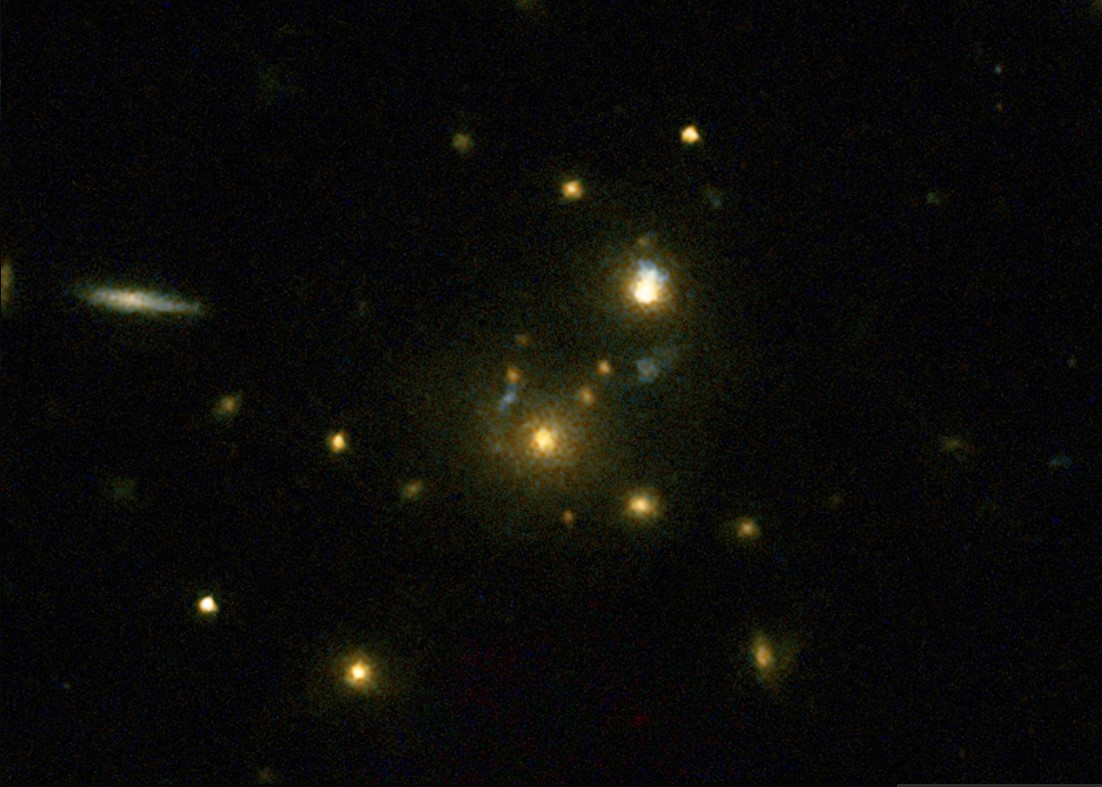
- The radio galaxy 3C 356.

Observation data (J2000.0 epoch)
- Constellation: Draco
- Right ascension: 17^{h} 24^{m} 19.041^{s}
- Declination: +50° 57′ 40.14″
- Redshift: 1.079000
- Heliocentric radial velocity: 323,476 km/s
- Distance: 7.817 Gly
- Apparent magnitude (V): 21.5
- Apparent magnitude (B): 21.5

Characteristics
- Type: NLRG

Other designations
- LHE 425, 4C 51.36, OHIO T 538, NRAO 526, NVSS J172420+505714, WB 1723+5100, LEDA 2817697

3C 356 is a distant radio galaxy located in the constellation of Draco, hosted by a merging pair of elliptical galaxies located at redshift (z) 1.079 with two radio cores having a separation gap of 5 arcseconds. It was first discovered as an astronomical radio source by P. Veron from a 3C revised catalogue in 1966 and such, shows an alignment effect at both wavelengths. The X-ray source luminosity for this galaxy is estimated to be 2.5 × 10^{44} erg s^{−1}.

== Description ==
3C 356 contains a double compact source with a 170° position angle. The source is found weakly depolarized in south-east direction closer to the central region. There is a presence of a northern object displaying a more ionized emission line spectrum likely the source's origin. In additional, the northern component is more compact but has an extension directly south by 3 arcseconds. According to Hubble Space Telescope (HST) imaging of a northwest component, this shows a high surface brightness conelike structure with a much fainter extension.

The radio structure of 3C 356 is complex. Its radio core position is unresolved with a diffused region peaking 5 arcseconds away at a position angle of 150° and a radio axis of 162°. There are two radio lobes in 3C 356 are located 15 arcseconds and 30 arcseconds in both directions. According to Very Large Array radio mapping, both northwestern and southeastern lobes are shown enlarged and overlaid polarized. In the southeastern lobe, there are three compact structures of equal brightness. The northwestern lobe on the other hand, contains a defined hot spot and more extended emission.

According to deep near-infrared imaging taken via Subaru Telescope, 3C 356 is found connected with a poor cluster of galaxies. A stellar mass of 4 × 10^{11} M_{☉} has also been calculated for the spectral energy distribution of the galaxy as well, with the supermassive black hole mass being 8.74 ± 0.42 M_{☉}.
