= 3C 35 =

Galaxy in the constellation Cassiopeia

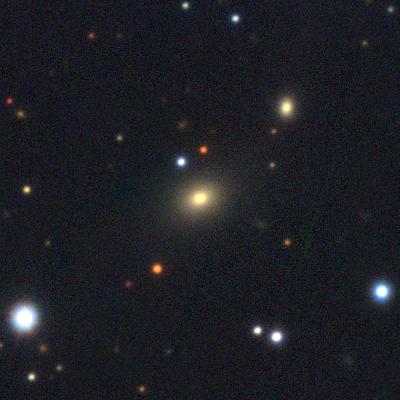

Observation data (J2000 epoch)
- Constellation: Cassiopeia
- Right ascension: 01^{h} 12^{m} 01.5^{s}
- Declination: +49° 28′ 34″
- Redshift: 0.067013
- Distance: 847 million light-years (Light travel time); 874 million light-years (present)
- Apparent magnitude (V): 15.6

Characteristics
- Type: E FR II; Quasar

Other designations
- LEDA 4310, 4C 49.04, 3C 35, QSO B0109+492

3C 35 is a giant radio galaxy with an active galactic nucleus (AGN). It is classified as a Fanaroff & Riley type II radio galaxy. It is located in the constellation Cassiopeia.

It is listed as a quasar by the SIMBAD astronomical database.
