= 3C 219 =

Galaxy in the constellation Ursa Major

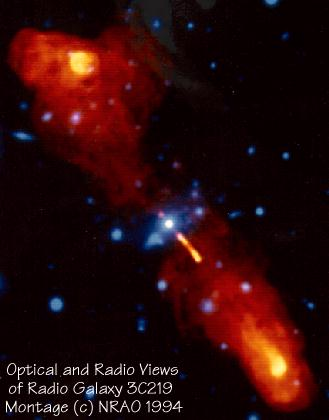

Observation data (Epoch J2000)
- Constellation: Ursa Major
- Right ascension: 09^{h} 21^{m} 08.6218^{s}
- Declination: +45° 38′ 57.268″
- Redshift: 0.174732
- Distance: 694 megaparsecs (2.26×10^{9} ly) h^{−1}_{0.73}
- Type: Sy1, AGN, X, G, IR, AG?, QSO, gam QSO, FR II
- Apparent magnitude (V): 18.69

Other designations
- DA 266, LEDA 2817605, 4C 45.19, QSO B0917+458

3C 219 is a Seyfert galaxy with a quasar-like appearance located in the constellation Ursa Major. This galaxy's radio jets are not detectable between the core and the outer radio lobes.

== See also ==
- Lists of galaxies
