= 3C 334 =

Quasar in the constellation Hercules

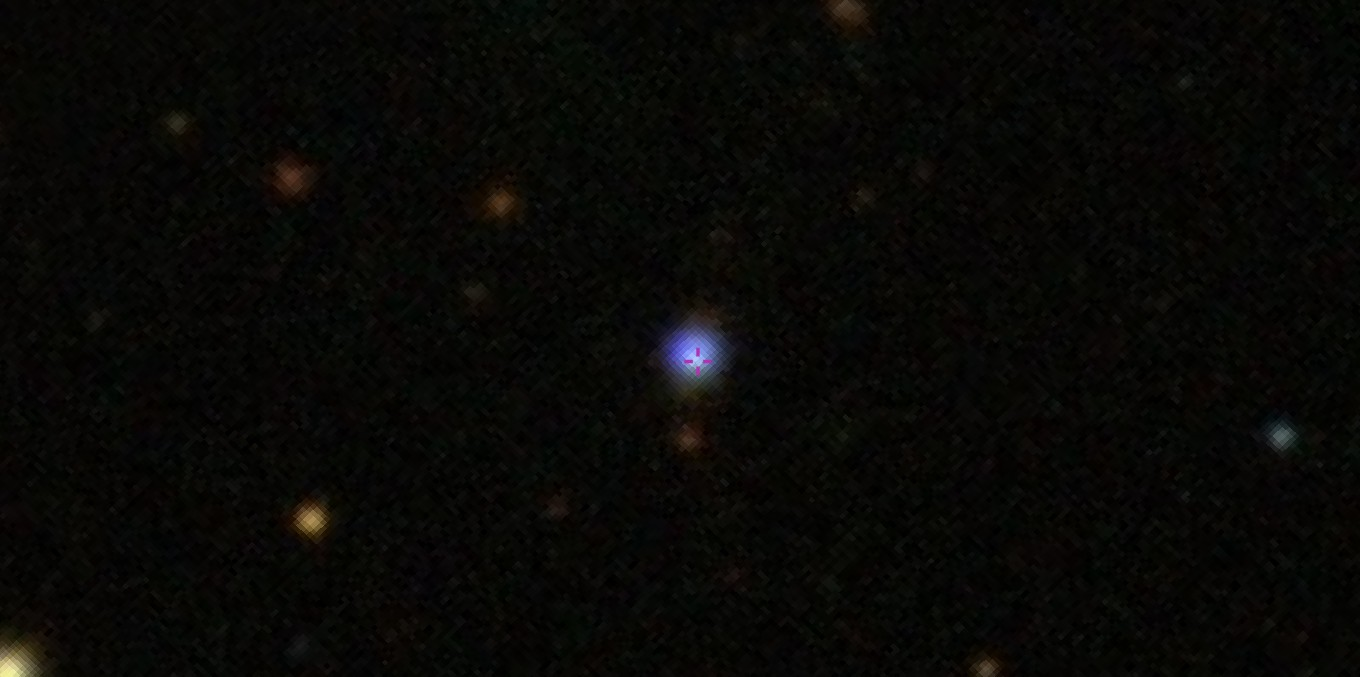
- The quasar 3C 334.

Observation data (J2000.0 epoch)
- Constellation: Hercules
- Right ascension: +16^{h} 20^{m} 21.819^{s}
- Declination: +17° 36′ 23.951″
- Redshift: 0.555167
- Heliocentric radial velocity: 166,435 km/s
- Distance: 5.255 Gly
- Apparent magnitude (V): 16.41
- Apparent magnitude (B): 16.53

Characteristics
- Type: QSO

Other designations
- NRAO 500, QSO B1618+1743, LEDA 2817681, 4C 17.68, OHIO S 131, PKS 1618+177, 2E 3648

3C 334 is a powerful radio-loud quasar located in the constellation of Hercules, about 5.2 billion light years away from Earth. It has a redshift of (z) 0.555. First discovered as an astronomical radio source in 1965, the object is classified as a lobe-dominated quasar showing signs of superluminal motion.

== Description ==
3C 334 is found to be located inside a dense cluster environment. It has a sharp bounded northern radio lobe with a plume extension in the south while the southern radio lobe on the other hand, is weakly brightened with a much faint lobe emission. There is also a trail of radio emission found leading towards a diffused hotspot, possibly interpreted as a counter-jet. A southern jet can be seen going straight before curving eastwards to a hotspot region, based on Multi-Element Radio Linked Interferometer Network and Very Large Array observation imaging. Low brightness emission is also present between the object's lobes and the radio core. There is a knot described as elongated, connecting to the hotspot via a weak emission bridge.

The host galaxy of the object has an elongated appearance. Based on observations, the host has twisted isotopes with an arc-like structure to the south direction evidently detected by its oxygen atom (O II) emission.

The object shows a variation period of 15 years indicating blazar behavior. In February 1997, it was found to be in a stable state but however its brightness faded by 0.05 magnitude after 2.5 hours. According to high resolution centimeter-millimeter observations, its core is found to have substantial variability, exhibiting core flux density values of 5 GHz which was measured during the past 20 years. Extended X-ray emission was also found emitting from the object with its 60ɥm luminosity measured as 10^{46} erg s^{−1}. The pressure of the emission from within its emission-line region has a value exceeding 6 × 10^{5} cm^{−3} Kelvin. Emission line imaging also showed the object having a bar-shaped nebula that is located at position angle of 150°.
