= 3C 288 =

Galaxy in constellation Canes Venatici

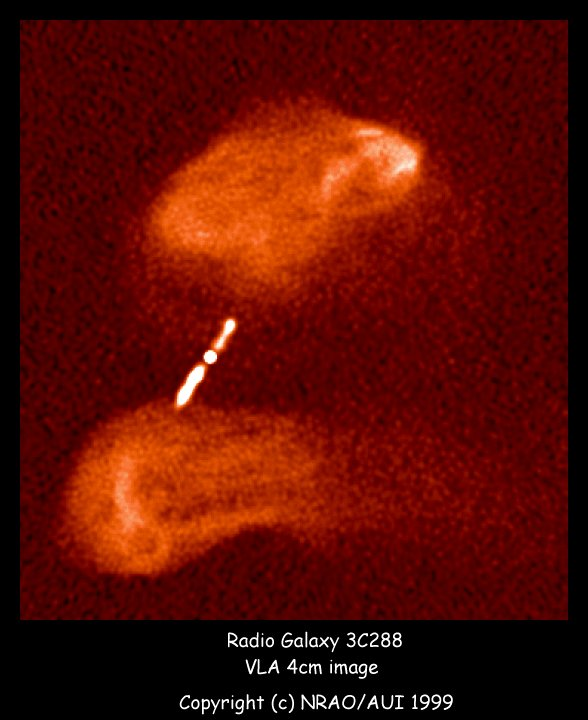

Observation data (Epoch J2000)
- Constellation: Canes Venatici
- Right ascension: 13^{h} 38^{m} 49.99^{s}
- Declination: +38° 51′ 09.5″
- Redshift: 0.246 000
- Distance: 960 megaparsecs (3.1×10^{9} ly) h^{−1}_{0.73}
- Type: rG, Rad, X, QSO, G G, FR I
- Apparent dimensions (V): 0.436' x 0.275'
- Apparent magnitude (V): 18.3

Other designations
- DA 349, LEDA 2138068, 3C 288, 4C 39.39, QSO B1336+391

3C 288 is a radio galaxy located in the constellation Canes Venatici.
