= 3C 49 =

Radio galaxy in the constellation of Pisces

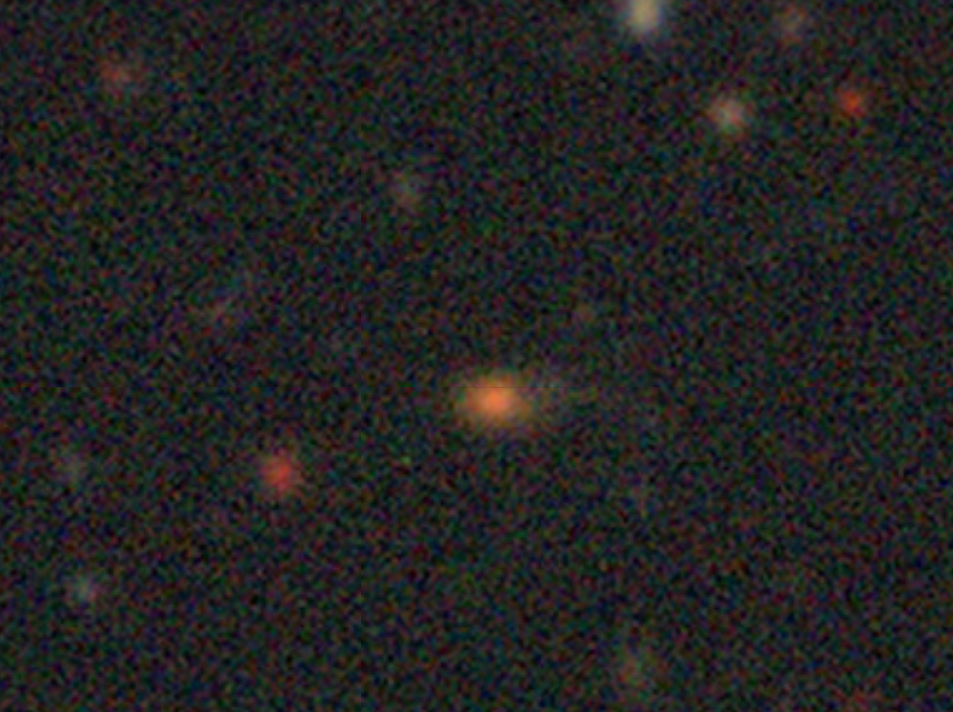
- DESI Legacy Surveys image of 3C 49

Observation data (J2000.0 epoch)
- Constellation: Pisces
- Right ascension: 01^{h} 41^{m} 09.16^{s}
- Declination: +13° 53′ 28.40″
- Redshift: 0.621000
- Heliocentric radial velocity: 186,171 km/s
- Distance: 6.013 Gly
- Apparent magnitude (V): 20.92
- Apparent magnitude (B): 22.32

Characteristics
- Type: Radio galaxy HEG
- Size: ~171,000 ly (52.5 kpc) (estimated)

Other designations
- 4C +13.10, PKS 0138+13, DA 056, OC +164, NRAO 0080, SDSS J014109.16+135328.3, NVSS J014109+135328, PGC 2817501

3C 49 is a radio galaxy located in the constellation of Pisces. The redshift of the object is (z) 0.621, and it was first discovered in the Third Cambridge Catalogue of Radio Sources survey in 1962. The radio spectrum of the galaxy is classified as compact and steep, making it a compact steep spectrum source (CSS).

== Description ==
3C 49 has a complex radio structure. The source is classified as an asymmetric double with two components that are orientated at a 90° position angle and separated by around 0.92 arcseconds, based on observations made with MERLIN. There is a western component and a radio emission bridge of low-surface brightness. At 5 GHz frequencies, a radio core is discovered close to the western component, with the spectral index being 0.14. A radio jet is seen connecting together with a hotspot at the western end. The source's total approximate age is found to be at least 10^{5} years, with its estimated hotspot advanced speed as around 0.05c to 0.1c.

The radio lobes of 3C 49 are irregular. The lobe on the western side is mainly circular with a bright and compact appearance, while the eastern lobe has a fainter appearance with a slight bend degree to the north. Apart from that, the eastern lobe is also depicted as having a steep radio spectrum, while the western lobe spectrum is described as initially flat, gradually steepening upon reaching 610 MHz frequencies.

Observations made with the Very Large Array (VLA) at 15 GHz found 3C 49 has no signs of polarization in both the components located in east and west directions. The host galaxy imaged with the Hubble Space Telescope (HST), is an elliptical galaxy displaying an arc of radio emission towards the western side and beyond the envelope. The total stellar mass of the galaxy is estimated to be 4.5 × 10^{11} M_{☉} and it has a stellar population mainly made up of young and intermediate stars. HST imaging also found the host galaxy has a slightly elongated appearance along the radio axis path.

In 3C 49 there are massive ionized outflows. Because of its extremely complicated velocity field, four Gaussian components are required to fit the outflow model. This suggests either the outflow interacting with the surrounding interstellar medium or its radio morphology is three-dimensional. A supermassive black hole mass of 17.6 × 10^{7} M_{☉} was estimated for the galaxy.
