= 3C 343 =

Quasar located in the constellation Draco

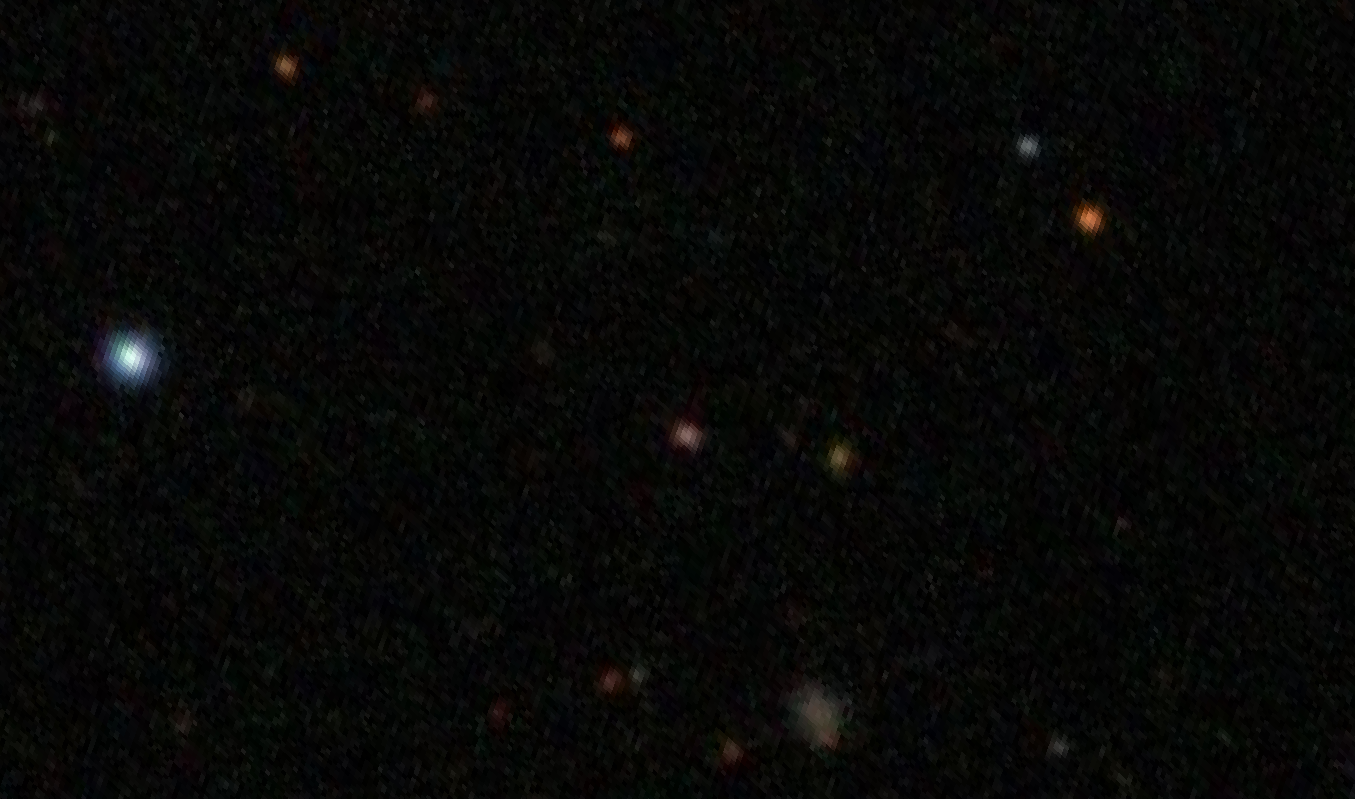
- SDSS image of 3C 343.

Observation data (J2000.0 epoch)
- Constellation: Draco
- Right ascension: 16^{h} 34^{m} 33.80^{s}
- Declination: +62° 45′ 35.89″
- Redshift: 0.988000
- Heliocentric radial velocity: 296,195 km/s
- Distance: 7.880 Gly
- Apparent magnitude (B): 21.06

Characteristics
- Type: HEG, CSS

Other designations
- 4C +62.26, LEDA 2817689, NVSS J163433+624535, 6C B163400.8+625137, DA 416, NRAO 0509, CoNFIG 255

3C 343 is a quasar located in the constellation of Draco. The redshift of the object is (z) 0.988 and it was first recorded in the Third Cambridge Catalogue of Radio Sources survey in 1962. It is a Seyfert type 2 galaxy and such contains a compact steep spectrum source that is classified as double.

== Description ==
3C 343 is classified as a young radio-loud active galaxy with a radio power of 27.7 GHz. It contains a compact source described as a single component that is around 200 milliseconds in diameter. Polarimetric observations made with the Very Long Baseline Array (VLBA) reveal two components that are surrounded by weak radio emission. Both of these components are shown to have a steep radio spectrum between the frequencies of 4.8 and 8.4 GHz.

Observations with European Very Long Baseline Interferometry (VLBI) at 18 centimeters showed the source has several emission ridges distributed across multiple position angles, while newer VLBI observations described the source as elongated from north to west. A complex structure is found inside a core component by VLBI. There is a radio jet present in 3C 343, having a knotty appearance and deflated through collisions with interstellar medium. This jet is estimated to have a linear size of 1.45 kiloparsecs.

A new component was discovered in 3C 343 via an 8.4 GHz radio image. This component is found in an eastern direction from the first component and has an estimated flux density of 7.7 mJy. It is noted to have a radio spectrum that is inverted, making it possible this is the radio core. Further evidence also revealed the component is situated on the jet's curved trajectory path. Polarization is found in 3C 343, with the percentage of it being around 0.96%. It is noted to be variable, increasing rapidly though wavelength observations. A supermassive black hole mass of 7.5 M_{☉} has been found for the quasar.
