= 3C 299 =

Galaxy in the constellation Boötes

Observation data (Epoch J2000)
- Constellation: Boötes
- Right ascension: 14^{h} 21^{m} 05.70^{s}
- Declination: +41° 44′ 49.0″
- Redshift: 0.367
- Distance: 1,390 megaparsecs (4.5×10^{9} ly) h^{−1}_{0.73}
- Type: rG, Rad, QSO, AGN; Core-Dominated, CSS
- Apparent magnitude (V): 19.33

Other designations
- DA 365, 3C 299, 4C 41.27

3C 299 is a radio galaxy/quasar located in the constellation Boötes.
