= 3C 268.3 =

Galaxy in the constellation Ursa Major

Observation data (Epoch J2000)
- Constellation: Ursa Major
- Right ascension: 12^{h} 06^{m} 24.9^{s}
- Declination: +64° 13′ 38″
- Redshift: 0.371710
- Distance: 1,405 megaparsecs (4.58×10^{9} ly) h^{−1}_{0.73}
- Type: Sy1, AGN, QSO, G G, FR II, CSS
- Apparent magnitude (V): 20.790

Other designations
- DA 316, LEDA 2821643, 3C 268.3, 4C 64.14

3C 268.3 is a Seyfert galaxy/quasar located in the constellation Ursa Major.

== See also ==
- Lists of galaxies
