= NGC 193 =

Lenticular galaxy in the constellation Pisces

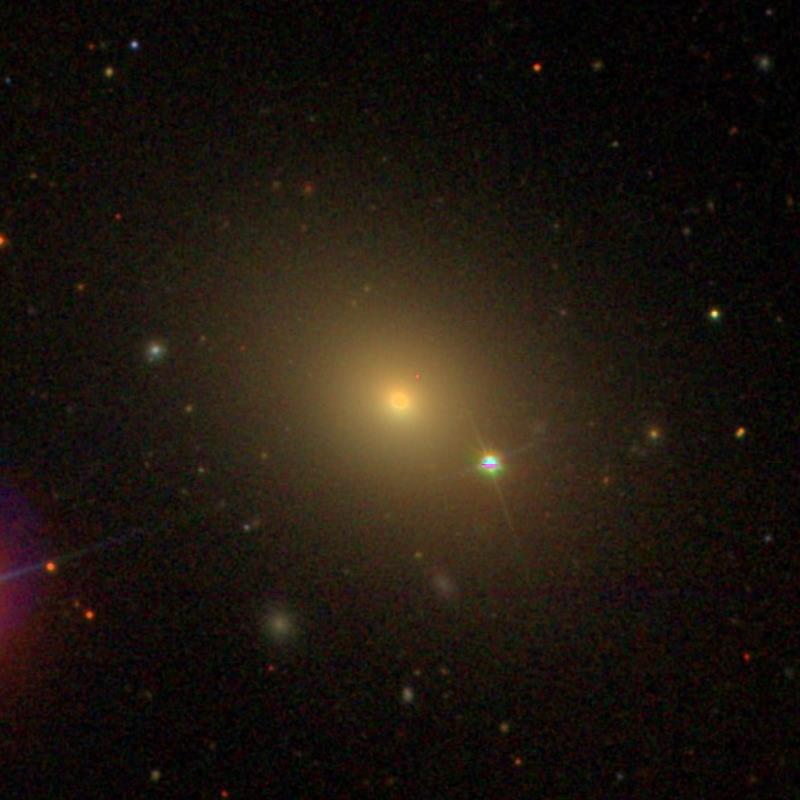
- SDSS image of NGC 193

Observation data (J2000 epoch)
- Constellation: Pisces
- Right ascension: 00^{h} 39^{m} 18.6^{s}
- Declination: +03° 19′ 52″
- Redshift: 0.014723
- Apparent magnitude (V): 13.25

Characteristics
- Type: SAB0^{−}(s)
- Apparent size (V): 1.4' × 1.2'

Other designations
- UGC 00408, CGCG 383-055, MCG +00-02-103, 4C +03.01, 2MASX J00391857+0319528, PGC 2359, PKS B0036+030, PMN J0039+0319, TXS 0036+030.

NGC 193 is a lenticular galaxy located in the constellation Pisces. It was discovered on December 21, 1786, by William Herschel.
