= 3C 324 =

Radio galaxy in the constellation of Serpens

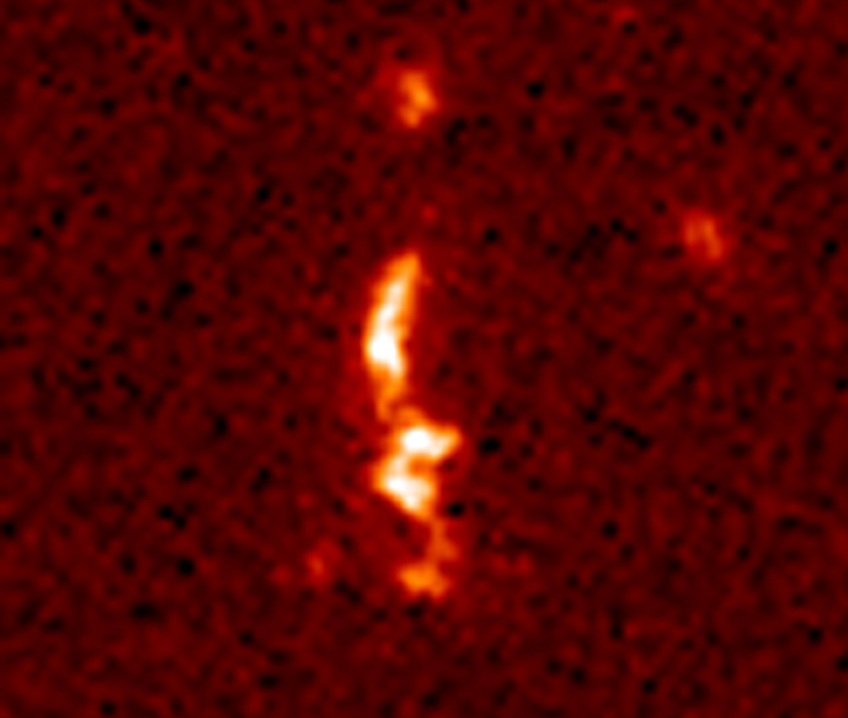
- HST image of 3C 324

Observation data (J2000.0 epoch)
- Constellation: Serpens
- Right ascension: 15^{h} 49^{m} 48.82^{s}
- Declination: +21° 25′ 37.97″
- Redshift: 1.206000
- Heliocentric radial velocity: 361,550 km/s
- Distance: 9 Gly
- Apparent magnitude (B): 21.5

Characteristics
- Type: NLRG
- Size: ~137,000 ly (42.1 kpc) (estimated)

Other designations
- 4C +21.46, PKS 1547+21, LEDA 2817675, CTA 069, NRAO 0484, NVSS J154948+212539, OR +279, DA 389, CoNFIG 230, TXS 1547+215

3C 324 is a radio galaxy located in the constellation of Serpens. The redshift of the galaxy is (z) 1.206, identified from emission lines, and it was first discovered as an astronomical radio source by astronomers in 1959. This galaxy has a light-travel time of nine billion light-years from Earth.

== Description ==
3C 324 is a member of a rich galaxy cluster, being positioned at the center of it. Its host is classified as a spheroidal shaped elliptical galaxy with a moderate luminous profile, based on imaging by the Subaru Telescope. The galaxy's appearance is reddened and it has a star population mainly dominated by old stars. Its current star formation rate is 52 M_{☉} per year and the total age of the galaxy is 6.0 × 10^{8} years. The supermassive black hole mass is 37 ± 30 × 10^{8} M_{☉}.

Further evidence also showed the host galaxy's appearance is slightly elongated due to the tidal interaction with a red companion. In infrared imaging, the galaxy shows distortions on its eastern side, taking the form of an irregular blob, suggesting its star formation rate may be triggered by ongoing galaxy mergers. Imaging by the Hubble Space Telescope (HST), showed its structure is broken up into a chain of high surface brightness clumps.

The radio source of the galaxy is categorized as a classic double. When imaged with the Very Large Array (VLA), it has two hot spot features located in its asymmetrical radio lobes, with one known faint radio feature situated within the southwest lobe. A broad extension is also noted stretching from the lobe towards the source's center. In the northeast lobe, a narrow feature is found. The southwest lobe is also described as heavily depolarized as compared to the northwest lobe. Other radio imaging showed the source has a radio jet passing along the edge of the eastern lobe before turning towards the north by 55°. Direct evidence also shows the lobe has a spectral index described as steep.

HST imaging revealed 3C 324 has emission-line regions located east and west. The gas regions are made up of two components with a velocity separation of 800 kilometers per seconds. These components are also shown as overlapping, with the western component being the slightly brightest and has a high full width at half maximum. A population of both red and blue galaxies have been found in the field around the galaxy.
