= 3C 212 =

Quasar in the constellation Cancer

Observation data (Epoch J2000)
- Constellation: Cancer
- Right ascension: 08^{h} 58^{m} 41.4449^{s}
- Declination: +14° 09′ 44.750″
- Redshift: 1.048
- Distance: 3,343 megaparsecs (1.090×10^{10} ly) h^{−1}_{0.73}
- Type: Rad, QSO, Bla, X, G, IR; QSO, FR II
- Apparent magnitude (V): 19.06

Other designations
- BWE 0855+1421, QSO J0858+1409, LEDA 2817600

3C 212 is a quasar located in the constellation Cancer. At redshift 1.048, it is one of the luminous and distant AGNs (Active Galactic Nuclei) observed.

3C 212 is classified as radio-loud and is considered to be a prototype "red quasar", with a faint optical counterpart. In additional, it is said to contain an X-ray absorber.
