= 3C 20 =

Radio galaxy in the constellation Cassiopeia

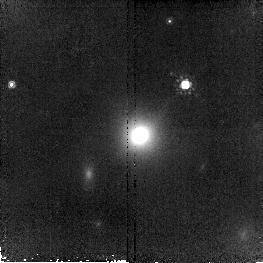

Observation data (J2000 epoch)
- Constellation: Cassiopeia
- Right ascension: 00^{h} 43^{m} 09.18^{s}
- Declination: +52° 03′ 36.15″
- Redshift: 0.174±0.001
- Heliocentric radial velocity: 52,164±300 km/s
- Galactocentric velocity: 52,352±300 km/s
- Distance: 2,501 ± 175.5 Mly (766.7 ± 53.8 Mpc)h^{−1}_{0.6774} (Comoving); 2.213 Gly (678.5 Mpc)h^{−1}_{0.6774} (Light-travel)
- Apparent magnitude (V): 19.0
- Apparent magnitude (B): 19.0
- magnitude (J): 16.368±0.112
- magnitude (H): 15.582±0.126
- magnitude (K): 14.756±0.115

Characteristics
- Type: NLRG
- Apparent size (V): 76.8″ × 76.8″² (radiogalaxy)

Other designations
- DA 22, 3C 20, LEDA 2817481

3C 20 is a radio galaxy located in the constellation Cassiopeia. It features a prominent double hotspot in its eastern lobe. An unusually low fraction of the flux lies within the radio core, which is suggested to be caused by a combination of factors, including jet orientation, synchrotron self-absorption and aging, as well as interactions with surrounding gas and dust.

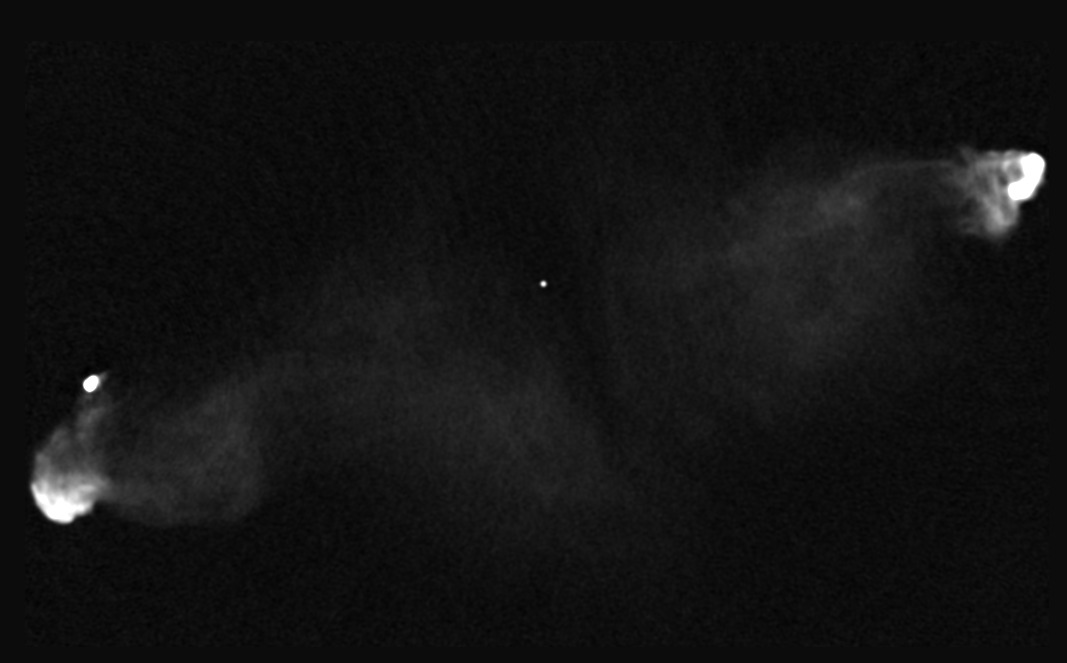
A radio image of 3C 20 at 0.22 arc-sec resolution.
