= 3C 66B =

Elliptical radio galaxy in the constellation Andromeda

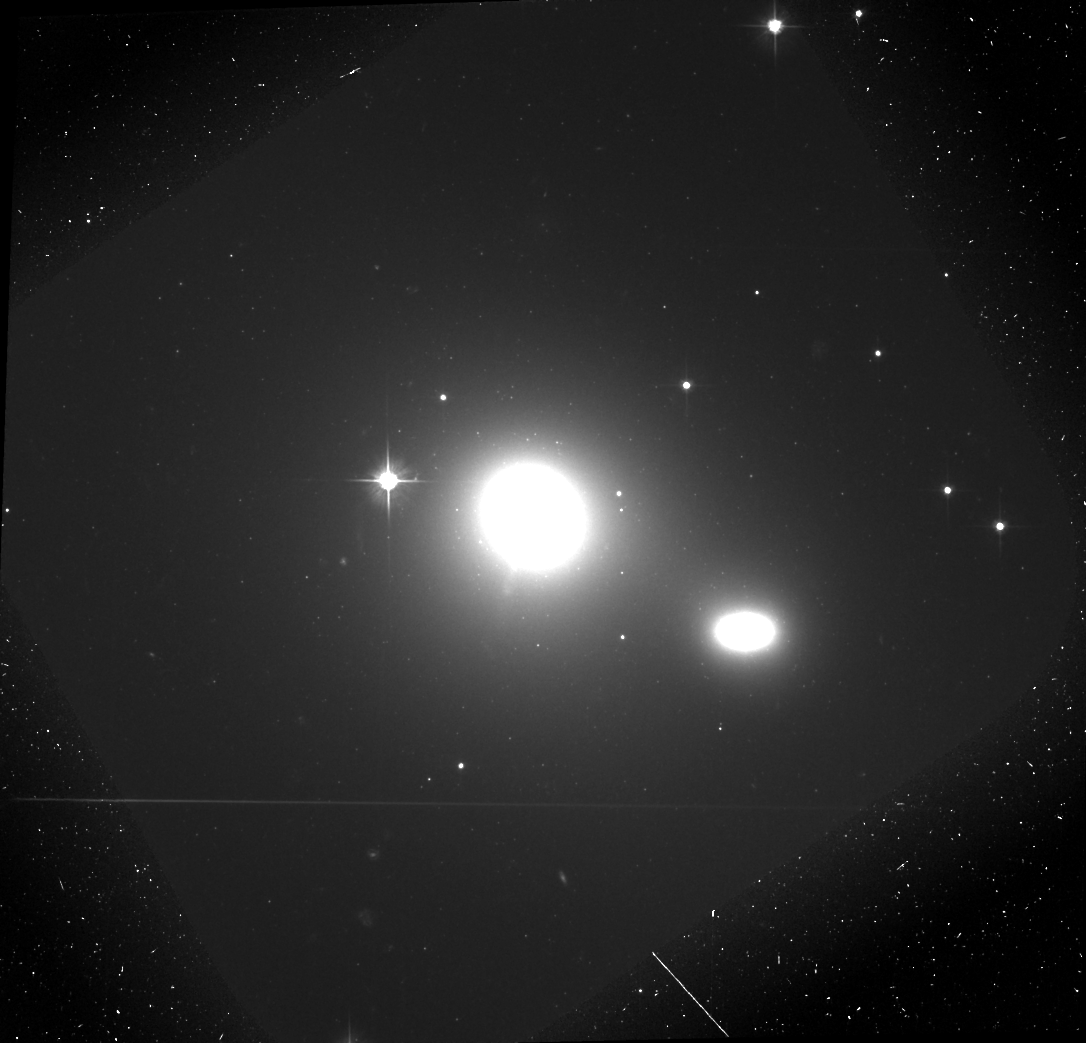
- Hubble Legacy Archive visible light image of 3C 66B

Observation data (J2000 epoch)
- Constellation: Andromeda
- Right ascension: 02^{h} 23^{m} 11.4112^{s}
- Declination: +42° 59′ 31.385″
- Redshift: 0.021258
- Heliocentric radial velocity: 6,367 km/s
- Distance: 240.67 ± 0.82 Mly (73.79 ± 0.25 Mpc)
- Group or cluster: Abell 0347
- Apparent magnitude (V): 15.0

Characteristics
- Type: E
- Apparent size (V): 3.0′ × 3.0′
- Notable features: FRI RG, gamma-ray source

Other designations
- 3C 66, 4C 42.07, QSO B0220+427, MAGIC J0223+430, 2MASX J02231141+4259313, UGC 1841, LEDA 9067, PGC 9067

3C 66B is an elliptical radio galaxy located in the constellation Andromeda. With an estimated redshift of 0.021258, the galaxy is about 240.7 Mly (73.79 Mpc) away. It has an angular separation of 6′ from the blazar 3C 66A, but the two are most likely unrelated. 3C 66B is an outlying member of Abell 347, which is part of the Perseus–Pisces Supercluster.

== Observations ==
This is a giant elliptical galaxy that is classified as a low-luminosity Fanaroff and Riley class 1 radio galaxy. Maps of the radio structure suggested that the emission is being shaped by the motion of the galaxy through an ambient medium. A strong jet and counter-jet extend about 330 thousand light-years (100 kpc) from the nucleus. These jets have been observed in radio, infrared, optical, ultraviolet, and X-ray bands. Gamma ray emission has been detected coming from the direction of this galaxy, which were most likely emitted from the core region.

Observations with the Hubble Space Telescope in 1990 showed that the jet has a filamentary, double-stranded structure. When viewed in the optical, the northern jet shows four knots along its length, all of which are polarized, thus indicating a synchrotron basis.

Very-long-baseline interferometry measurements of the galaxy's radio-emitting core demonstrated elliptical motion with a period of 1.05±0.03 years. This strongly suggested that a supermassive black hole binary (SMBHB) was located at the center of 3C 66B. This motion was expected to emit gravitational waves that would cause fluctuations in the pulse arrival times from the pulsar PSR B1855+09. However, no such signature was found. Numerical simulations indicated this detection method may only be valid for an orbital eccentricity below 0.03.

Messier 87 (M87), about 55 million light-years away, is the largest giant elliptical galaxy near the Earth, and also contains an active galactic nucleus. The smooth jet of 3C 66B rivals that of M87.

== Gallery ==
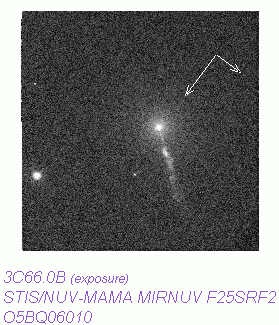
Hubble Near-UV image of the jet coming out of 3C 66B

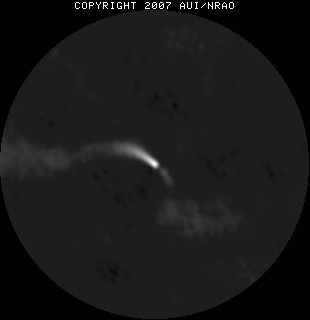
NRAO VLA image of 3C 66B
