= Fanaroff–Riley classification =

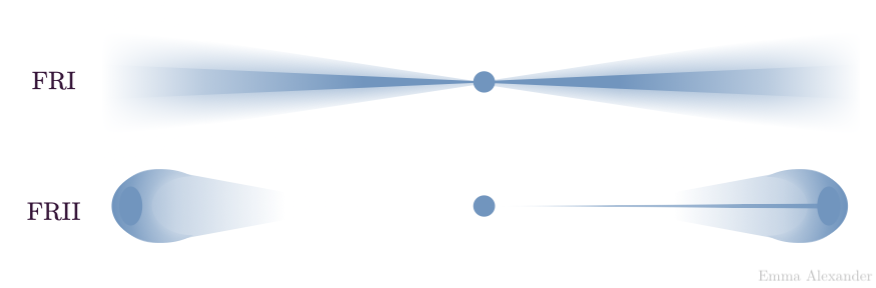
FR1 (top) vs FR2 (bottom)

The Fanaroff–Riley classification is a scheme created by B.L. Fanaroff and J.M. Riley in 1974, which is used to distinguish radio galaxies with active nuclei based on their radio luminosity or brightness of their radio emissions in relation to their hosting environment. Fanaroff and Riley noticed that the relative positions of high/low surface brightness regions in the lobes of extragalactic radio sources are correlated with their radio luminosity. Their conclusion was based on a set of 57 radio galaxies and quasars that were clearly resolved at 1.4 GHz or 5 GHz into two or more components. Fanaroff and Riley divided this sample into two classes using the ratio of the distance between the regions of highest surface brightness on opposite sides of the central galaxy or quasar to the total extent of the source up to the lowest brightness contour. Class I (abbreviated FR-I) are sources whose luminosity decreases as the distance from the central galaxy or quasar host increases, while Class II (FR-II) sources exhibit increasing luminosity in the lobes. This distinction is important because it presents a direct link between the galaxy's luminosity and the way in which energy is transported from the central region and converted to radio emission in the outer parts.

== Fanaroff-Riley Class I (FR-I) ==
These sources are brighter towards their central galaxy or quasar and become fainter toward the outer extremities of the lobes (also called edge-darkened). The spectra here are steepest, indicating that the radiating particles have aged the most. Jets are detected in a large majority of FR-I galaxies, and these hosts also tend to be bright, large galaxies often located in rich clusters with extreme X-ray emitting gas. As the galaxy moves through the cluster, the gas can sweep back and distort the radio structure through ram pressure.

== Fanaroff-Riley Class II (FR-II) ==
This class of sources are also known as edge-brightened and are more luminous than their counterparts, with bright hotspots at the ends of their lobes. The jets are often one-sided due to relativistic beaming.

== See also ==
- Category:3C objects
- Category:4C objects
