= Third Cambridge Catalogue of Radio Sources =

Astronomical catalogue of celestial radio sources

- Alternative names: 3C
- Website: vizier.cfa.harvard.edu/viz-bin/VizieR-3?-source=VIII%2F1A&-out.max=50&-out.form=HTML
- Related media on Commons

The Third Cambridge Catalogue of Radio Sources (3C) is an astronomical catalogue of celestial radio sources detected originally at 159 MHz, and subsequently at 178 MHz.

== History ==
=== 3C ===
The catalogue was published in 1959 by members of the Radio Astronomy Group of the University of Cambridge. Entries in the catalogue are identified by the prefix "3C" followed by the entry number, with a space—for example, 3C 273. The number denotes objects in order of increasing right ascension. The catalogue was produced using the Cambridge Interferometer on the west side of Cambridge. The interferometer had previously been used for the Second Cambridge Catalogue of Radio Sources (2C) survey, published in 1955.

=== 3CR ===
The catalogue was subsequently revised by Bennett in 1962 using observations at 178 MHz, and for many years '3CR' was considered as the definitive listing of the brighter radio sources in the Northern Hemisphere. The revision resulted in a number of sources being deleted from the catalogue (as being below the flux limit of 9 Jy or as now-resolved blends of adjacent sources) and others being added. To avoid renumbering the existing sources (which were listed in RA order) these new sources were added using a decimal extension. E.g. 3C 323.1 follows 3C 323 in Right Ascension and precedes 3C 324.

=== 3CRR ===
A further revision by R.A. Laing, Julia Riley and Malcolm Longair in 1983, called 3CRR or 3CR², included galaxies which were not detected in the original catalogue due to shortcomings of the original observations, but which otherwise meet the flux and declination limits. This revision includes all extragalactic radio sources in the Northern Hemisphere with 178-MHz flux density greater that 10.9 Janskys, declination greater than 10 degrees, and Galactic latitude greater than 10 degrees or less than -10 degrees. It excludes a number of well-known 3C/3CR objects, including all the supernova remnants from 3C, but also some well-known radio galaxies that lie outside the declination, flux density or galactic latitude constraints. Objects that had been discovered to consist of multiple components associated with different objects were given an alphabetical suffix (A, B...) to make it clear which component was part of the sample: e.g. the radio galaxy 3C 66B is part of the sample, but the BL Lac object 3C 66A is not.
