= Fourth Cambridge Survey of Radio Sources =

Astronomical catalogue

Fourth Cambridge Survey
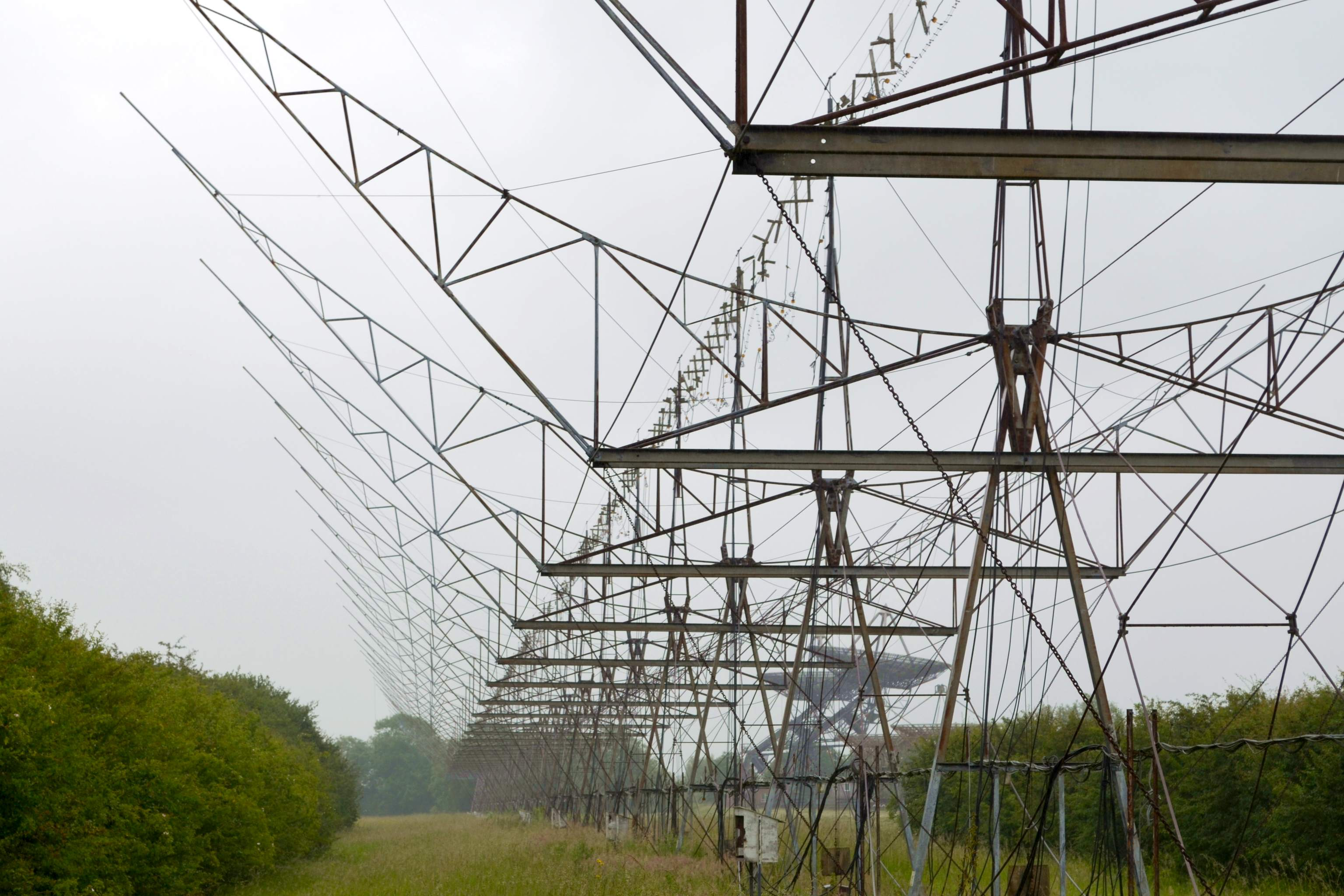
- Alternative names: 4C
- Website: vizier.cfa.harvard.edu/viz-bin/VizieR-3?-source=VIII%2F4&-out.max=50&-out.form=HTML

The Fourth Cambridge Survey (4C) is an astronomical catalogue of celestial radio sources as measured at 178 MHz using the 4C Array. It was published in two parts, in 1965 (for declinations +20 to +40) and 1967 (declinations −7 to + 20 and +40 to +80), by the Radio Astronomy Group of the University of Cambridge. References to entries in this catalogue use the prefix 4C followed by the declination in degrees, followed by a period, and then followed by the source number on that declination strip, e.g. 4C-06.23.

The 4C Array, which used the technique of aperture synthesis, could reliably position sources with flux densities of around 2 Jy, to within about 0.35 arcmin in right ascension and 2.5 arcmin in declination.
