= PKS J0116−4722 =

Radio galaxy in the constellation Phoenix

PKS J0116-2722
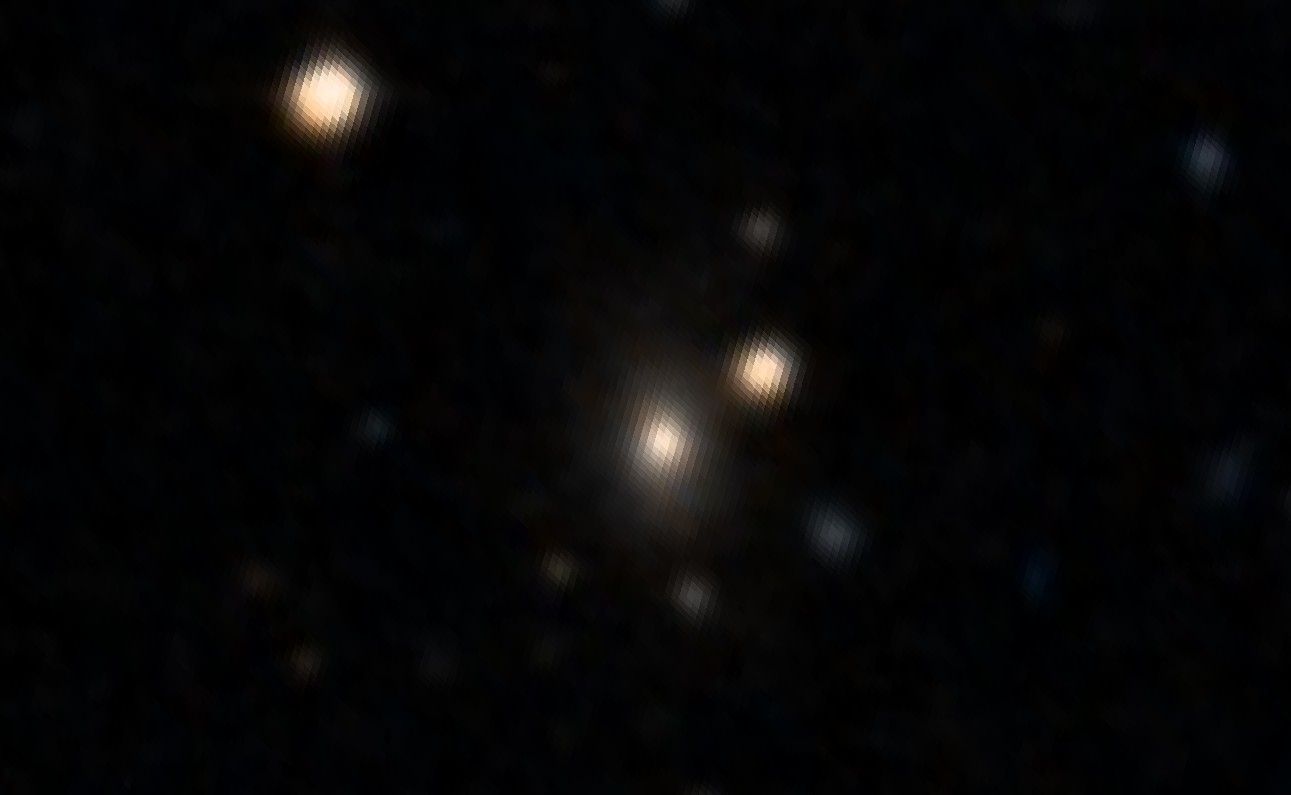
- The radio galaxy PKS J0116−4722

Observation data
- Constellation: Phoenix
- Right ascension: 01^{h} 16^{m} 25.039^{s}
- Declination: −47° 22′ 41.189″
- Redshift: 0.147800
- Heliocentric radial velocity: 44,309 km/s
- Distance: 2.235 Gly (685.4 Mpc)
- Apparent magnitude (V): 16.5

Characteristics
- Type: Elliptical, FR II, Giant Radio Source
- Size: ~346,000 ly (106.1 kpc) (estimated)

Other designations
- PKS 0114−47, Cul 0114−476, PGC 4603, GRS J0116−4722, 0114−47

PKS J0116−4722 also known as J0116−473 in literature, is a radio galaxy located in the constellation of Phoenix. Its redshift is (z) 0.147800 and it was first discovered as a radio source by astronomers who were conducting the Parkes Catalogue of Radio Sources survey in 1964, designated as PKS 0114−47.

== Description ==
PKS J0116−4722 is classified as a giant Fanaroff-Riley Type II radio galaxy with a total radio luminosity of 2.2 × 10^{26} W Hz^{−1} and a linear size of 2.1 megaparsecs. It is located in a sparse galaxy environment with three galaxies encircling it.

PKS J0116−4722 has a variable radio core described as a point-like source, with an X-ray spectrum best fitted with a double power law of 0.3-0.8 kiloelectron volts (KeV). A wiggled jet is seen emerging from the core, curving through a large angle and terminating at an emission-plateau. There is a peculiar feature shown as linear and intersecting the source between the jet's bright knot and the core. Earlier observations described it, a giant complex source.

Two massive radio lobes are found in PKS J0116-2722. They are described as edge-brightened and showing polarization on their outer boundaries. However, both ends of the lobes showed absence of compact hotspots; instead having warm spots in their place. Radio imaging observations by Australia Telescope Compact Array (ATCA), showed the galaxy has an inner set of radio lobes located north and south, with radio luminosities of 2 × 10^{25} W Hz^{−1}. However the inner northern lobe is short and diffused, while the inner southern lobe is described as elongated, displaying radio emission peaks. These inner lobes in the galaxy are implied to be formed from renewed nuclear core activity, happening around (3-5) × 10^{6} years ago.

A bar-like feature has been discovered by ATCA in the southern radio lobe of PKS J0116-2722. When observed, it has a sharp bound along the galaxy's northern edge, appearing as a separate component. This bar-like feature has high degree of fractional polarization and a steep radio spectra index in its emission. Should this feature be described as a wing feature, PKS J0116-2722 can be reclassified as an X-shaped radio galaxy.
