= B2 0828+32 =

Radio galaxy in the constellation of Cancer

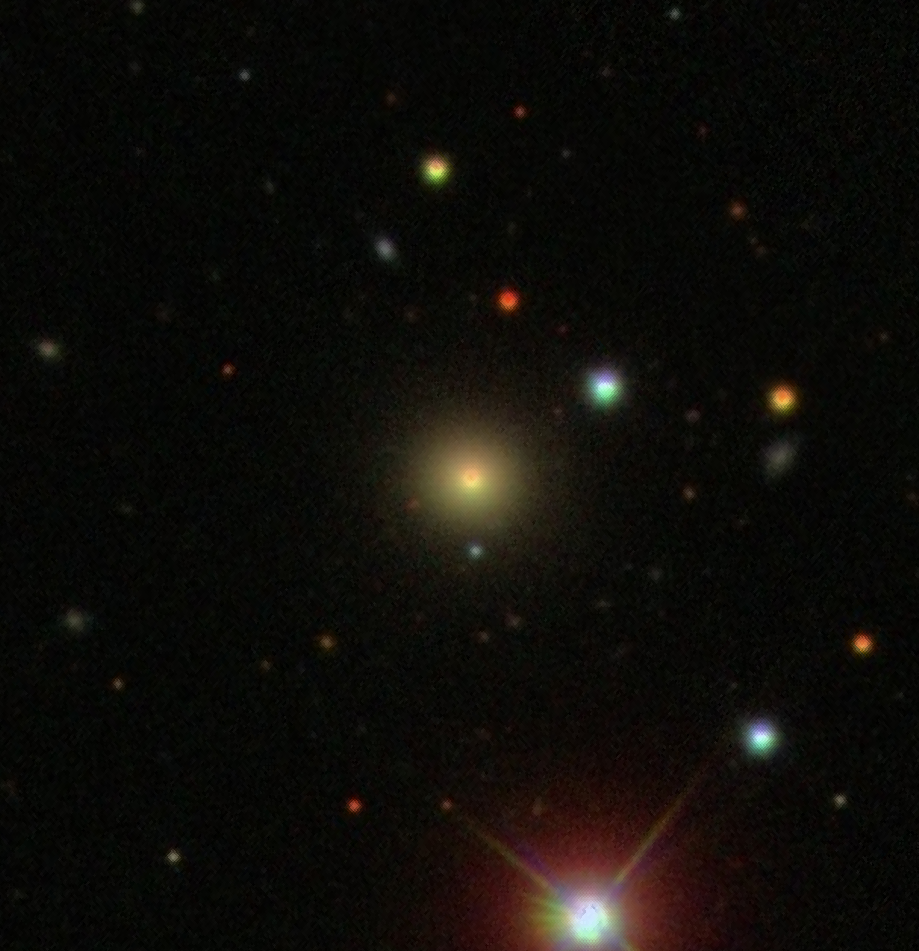
- SDSS image of B2 0828+32

Observation data (J2000 epoch)
- Constellation: Cancer
- Right ascension: 08^{h} 31^{m} 27.50^{s}
- Declination: +32° 19′ 26.94″
- Redshift: 0.051200
- Heliocentric radial velocity: 15,349 km/s
- Distance: 721 Mly
- Apparent magnitude (B): 16.0

Characteristics
- Type: E WLAGN
- Size: ~180,200 ly (55.26 kpc) (estimated)

Other designations
- 4C +32.25, 0828+325, 2MASX J08312752+3219270, PGC 23915, CoNFIG 274, Cul 0828+324, NSA 036002, SIG 0936, MaNGA 01-164685, NPM1G +32.0173

B2 0828+32 is a radio galaxy located in the constellation of Cancer. The redshift of the galaxy is (z) 0.051 and it was first discovered in 1969 as an astronomical radio source by astronomers led by C. Fanti, who designated it as 4C 32.25.

== Description ==
B2 0828+32 is shown to be depicted as a regular elliptical galaxy with an undisturbed appearance suggesting no evidence of any major galaxy mergers. Its luminosity profile sharp is normal like any other early-type galaxies with the galaxy's total surface brightness estimated to be 21.75 magnitude per arcseconds. The galaxy also displays an absence of a double core in addition and does not belong in any of the galaxy clusters. The mass of the central supermassive black hole is estimated to be 8.08 ± 0.06 M_{☉}.

Studies have categorized the galaxy as a peculiar low-luminosity radio galaxy with a weak-line active galactic nucleus. When observed with the Effelsberg 100-mRadio Telescope, it is found to have radio lobes classified as asymmetric, with the western radio lobe found to be much brighter while the eastern radio lobe has strong polarization. These lobes are estimated to reach around 430 kiloparsecs in length, with wing features shown to contain high amount of fractional polarization at 40 percent but little signs of depolarization between the frequencies of 0.6 and 10 GHz. The lobes are also considered as active with a radio spectrum that is fairly flat but steepens as a reaches the wing features. The arcsecond radio core of B2 0828+32 is estimated to have a flux density of less than 4 mJy. Evidence also pointed there is a hotspot present inside a western component through no signs of a bright feature was located inside its eastern lobe based on 5 GHz observations. A linear extended feature is found in the eastern hotspot. There is a radio jet pointing towards the direction of east.

A pair of young radio lobes have been found in B2 0828+32. Based on studies, they are estimated to be less than 70 million years old with an estimated luminosity of around 10^{41} ergs^{−1}. Subsequent studies have classified B2 0828+32 as an X-shaped radio galaxy based on radio imaging with signs of S-shaped distortions and hotspot features along the southeast to northwest axis. Evidence also found the north wing spectral index is flat than the values of -2.79 ± 0.30 whereas the south wing spectral index is steep with values more than -0.37 ± 0.21. A binary supermassive black hole is suggested to lie in the center of B2 0828+32.
