= 4C 19.44 =

Quasar in the constellation Boötes

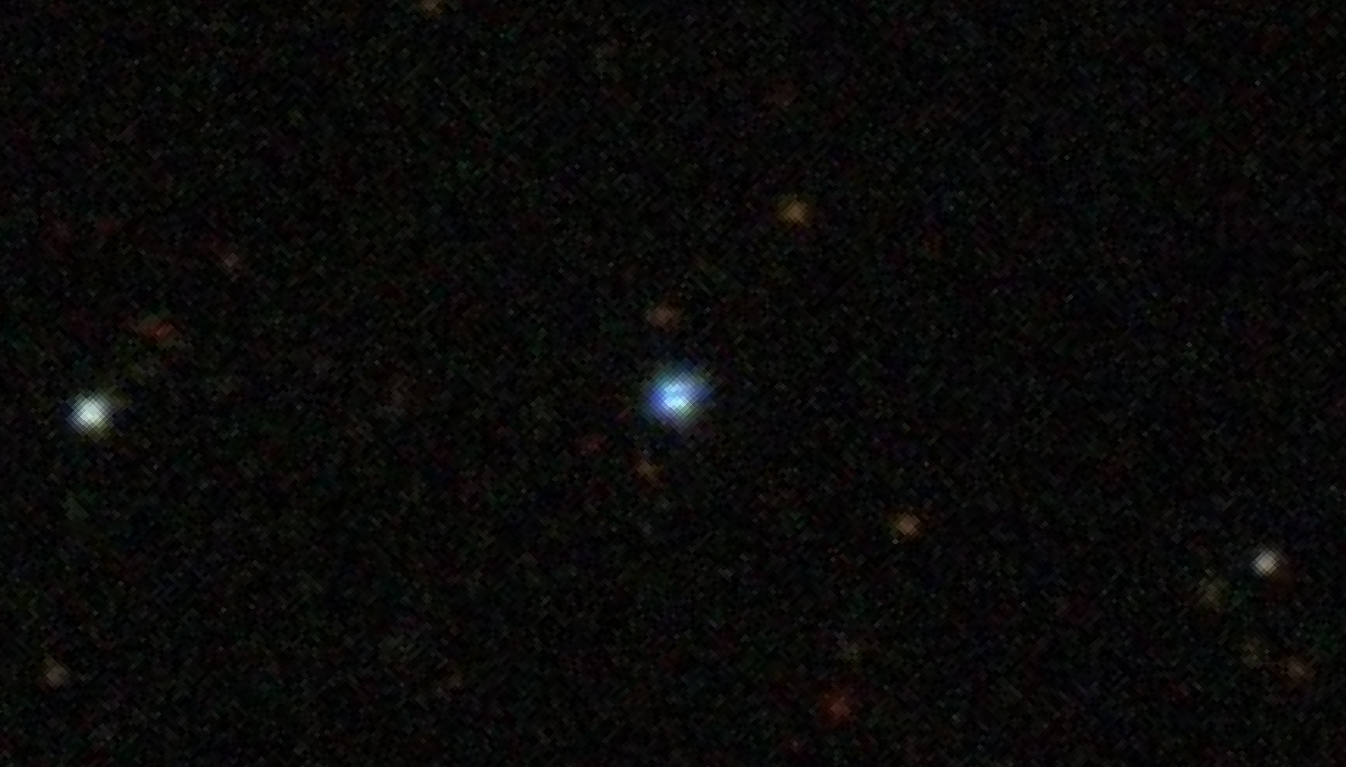
- The quasar 4C 19.44

Observation data (J2000.0 epoch)
- Constellation: Boötes
- Right ascension: 13^{h} 57^{m} 04.43^{s}
- Declination: +19° 19′ 07.37″
- Redshift: 0.719668
- Heliocentric radial velocity: 215751 km/s
- Distance: 6.605 Gly
- Apparent magnitude (V): 16.03

Characteristics
- Type: Opt.var. Sy1.5
- Size: ~241,300 ly (73.98 kpc) (estimated)

Other designations
- CoNFIG 181, DA 354, LEDA 2819584, G4Jy 1108, OP +191, PKS 1354+19, SDSS J135704.43+191907.3, VIPS 0717, WMAP 004, VRO 19.13.06

4C 19.44 is a quasar located in the constellation of Boötes. The redshift of the quasar is (z) 0.719 and it was first discovered in September 1966 by astronomers J.G. Bolton and T.D. Kinman as a quasi-stellar object. This quasar is best known for its extremely long radio jet.

== Description ==
4C 19.44 is found to be mildly variable based on optical monitoring, which it underwent least one steady brightening event between February 1969 and December 1970. However, no variability was noted at 2.2 ɥm.

The radio structure of 4C 19.44 is found to be compact. When observed by Very Long Baseline Interferometry (VLBI), it is found to have a double structure, with its components separated by 0.75 milliarcseconds from each other and orientated along the position angle of -29°. The radio spectrum of the quasar is categorized as of low frequencies and being dominated by a component of steep spectrum. When observed higher than 2 GHz, the radio spectrum becomes flat with a flux density mainly at 1.0 and 2.0 Jansky. Radio imaging made by Very Large Array (VLA), would find it as a triple source instead with its total extend of 44 arcseconds. There is also a north-west component present with a spectral index of 1.04 ± 0.05. A core-jet structure is found located mainly within its nucleus.

The jet of 4C 19.44 is described as one-sided, long and straight with a distance of 18 arcseconds. When observed, the jet is found to extend towards the south-east direction before ending in a hotspot position with a knotty appearance containing 11 jet knots in total. Further evidence also pointed out that the jet shows wiggles close to the position of the radio core but remains straight for about nine arcseconds within the core then turns towards east direction. There are also traces of high polarization levels of around 24.7 ± 6.0% with a main position angle of 84 ± 6°. This jet is also observed by Chandra X-ray Observatory where detections of X-ray emission are found.

A study finds there are radio lobes present in the quasar. Based on studies, the lobe on the northern side is located in the direction of its counter-jet, about 16 arcseconds away and has a position angle of -14°. Evidence also found there are features inside the lobe, which is a bright hotspot and a bright knot feature that is separated from the hotspot and located four arcseconds west. Polarization is mainly low in the hotspot, only at 2% suggesting the possibility of its magnetic field rotation direction.
