= PKS 0208−512 =

Blazar in the constellation Eridanus

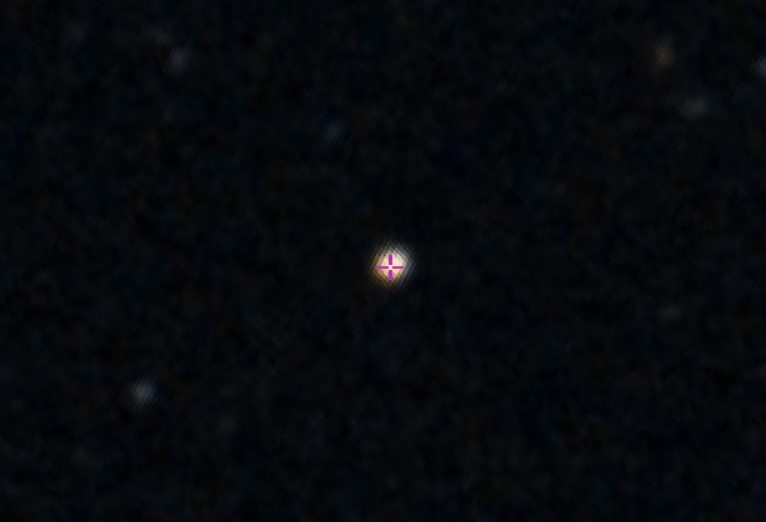
- The blazar PKS 0208−512

Observation data (J2000.0 epoch)
- Constellation: Eridanus
- Right ascension: 02^{h} 10^{m} 46.200^{s}
- Declination: −51° 01′ 01.892″
- Redshift: 0.999000
- Heliocentric radial velocity: 299,493 km/s
- Distance: 7.926 Gly
- Apparent magnitude (V): 16.93
- Apparent magnitude (B): 17.1

Characteristics
- Type: HPQ, BL LAC

Other designations
- LEDA 2822981, HE 0208−5115, PMN J0210−5101, WMAP 158, 3FGL J0210.7−5101

PKS 0208−512 is a blazar located in the southern constellation of Eridanus. It has a redshift of 1.003 and was first discovered in 1975 by astronomers conducting the Parkes 2700 MHz survey in Australia as a bright astronomical radio source. This object is also classified highly polarized with the radio spectrum appearing to be flat, thus making it a flat-spectrum radio quasar.

== Description ==
PKS 0208−512 is found to be strongly variable on the electromagnetic spectrum. It shows a significant correlation between its intensity and spectral index, and is a source of gamma ray activity. It is known to have three powerful outbursts when observed at optical to near-infrared wavelengths. Between September 11 and 30 in 2008, the quasar brightened upon showing a flare, with increased magnitudes in both B-band and R-band. In the gamma ray lightcurve, it showed a variable flux reaching a factor of 6 on timescales of weeks.

A major gamma ray flare was detected in PKS 0208−512 between November 2019 and May 2020. Fermi-LAT observations proposed that its daily average gamma ray flux at > 100 MeV amplified to (1.1±0.2)×10^{−6} ph cm^{−2} s^{−1} on November 29, 2019, and subsequently to (2.0±0.3)×10^{−6} photons cm^{−2} s^{−1} by March 15, 2020. During the activity, the gamma ray lightcurve exhibited multiple peaks indicating the presence of subflares.

PKS 0208−512 has a complex radio structure. It is made up of a compact radio core with a projected spectral flux density of 2.8 Jansky and a jet component located at a position angle of 234° from the core with an angular separation of 1.7 mas. Using 2.3 and 5.0 GHz results, the core has a spectral index of 0.15, as well as having an obtained brightness temperature of 1.9 trillion K. There is also a long jet present at a position angle of −129°. This jet is found similar to the milliarcsecond-scale radio jet's position angle, suggesting it is straight from parsec to kiloparsec scales. When seen through the jet's structure, there are four knot regions which increases orderly from the nucleus.

The supermassive black hole in PKS 0208−512 is estimated to be 6×10^{7} M_{☉} based on an assumption of its isotopic Eddington-limited emission. A luminosity of L_{d} ≈ 8×10^{45} erg/s was estimated for its accretion disk.
