= 3C 192 =

Radio galaxy in the constellation Cancer

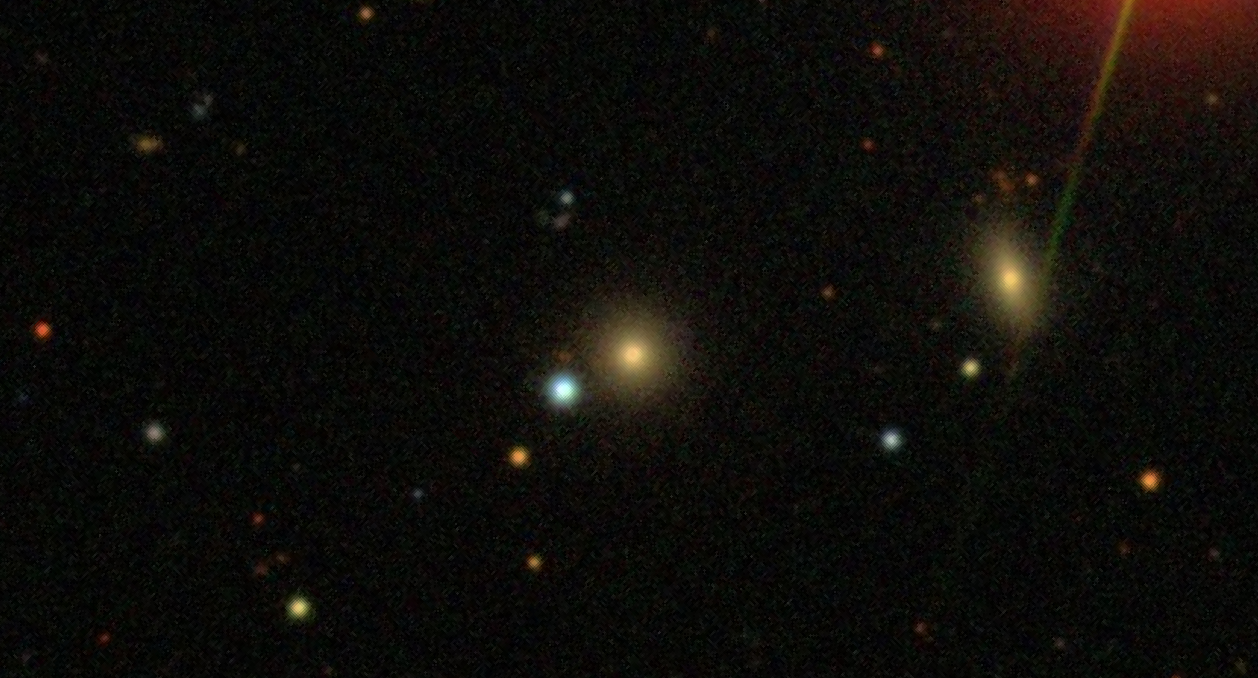
- SDSS image of 3C 192

Observation data (J2000 epoch)
- Constellation: Cancer
- Right ascension: 08^{h} 05^{m} 35.01^{s}
- Declination: +24° 09′ 50.16″
- Redshift: 0.059678
- Heliocentric radial velocity: 17,891 ± 3 km/s
- Distance: 857.4 ± 60.0 Mly (262.87 ± 18.40 Mpc)
- Apparent magnitude (V): 15.83

Characteristics
- Type: BrClG;NLRG;Sy2;HEG
- Size: ~790,000 ly (242.1 kpc) (estimated)

Other designations
- 4C +24.16, CoNFIG 011, CTD 052, PGC 22719, NRAO 280, OJ +204, PKS 0802+24, [YSS2008] 602 BCG

3C 192 is a Fanaroff–Riley Class Type II radio galaxy located in the constellation of Cancer. The redshift of the galaxy is (z) 0.059 and it was first discovered by astronomers as an astronomical radio source in 1959.

== Description ==
3C 192 is categorized as a double radio galaxy. Its host is a round elliptical galaxy belonging to a small galaxy group with no any signs of interactions based on near-infrared imaging made by Hubble Space Telescope. There are also presence of multiple globular clusters in the galaxy. A study also detected the narrow emission lines of the galaxy are mainly extended with structures present being co-spatial with other features detected in radio emission. The emission lines are also depicted to contain high ionization levels. The nuclear region of the galaxy is elliptical and it has offset thin patches of interstellar dust. The central supermassive black hole of the galaxy is 8.21 ± 0.07 M_{☉}.

The radio structure of 3C 192 is found to be compact with regions of high surface brightness located close to the position of the hotspots. The hotspot on the north to west side remains largely unresolved while the hotspot on the south to east side is resolved. On the outer parts of its narrow radio lobes, the magnetic field is shown parallel to the axis of the source and also the lobe boundaries. Fractional polarizations have also been detected in the lobes of at least 50%. The age of the source has been estimated to be around 3 × 10^{7} years.

Radio imaging made with Very Large Array (VLA) has found the northern hotspot shows a pair of faint filaments appearing to lead to into the direction of it. The hotspot itself is depicted as having a compact appearance and is mainly surrounded by a bright extended structure in the south and a faint edge-brightened component in the north. A hotspot complex described as having a ring-like appearance, is shown connected towards the lobe by a neck feature. The radio core of the galaxy is found well resolved and is surrounded by ultraviolet emission. On the eastern side of the core, there is a further a curved arc of ultraviolet emission. On lower levels, the emission is shown forming into an elongated spiral structure along the direction of its radio jet.

A study has described 3C 192 having an X-shaped morphology thus the classification of it being an X-shaped radio galaxy. When observed at 240 and 610 MHz frequencies, the wing features are depicted to have angular sizes of both 210 and 120 arcseconds. There are also evidence of symmetrical distortions of the wing features. A weak transverse feature is found located within the southeast wing. The spectral indices of the wings are estimated to be -0.88 ± 0.03 and -0.98 ± 0.02.
