= 3C 28 =

Galaxy in the constellation of Pisces

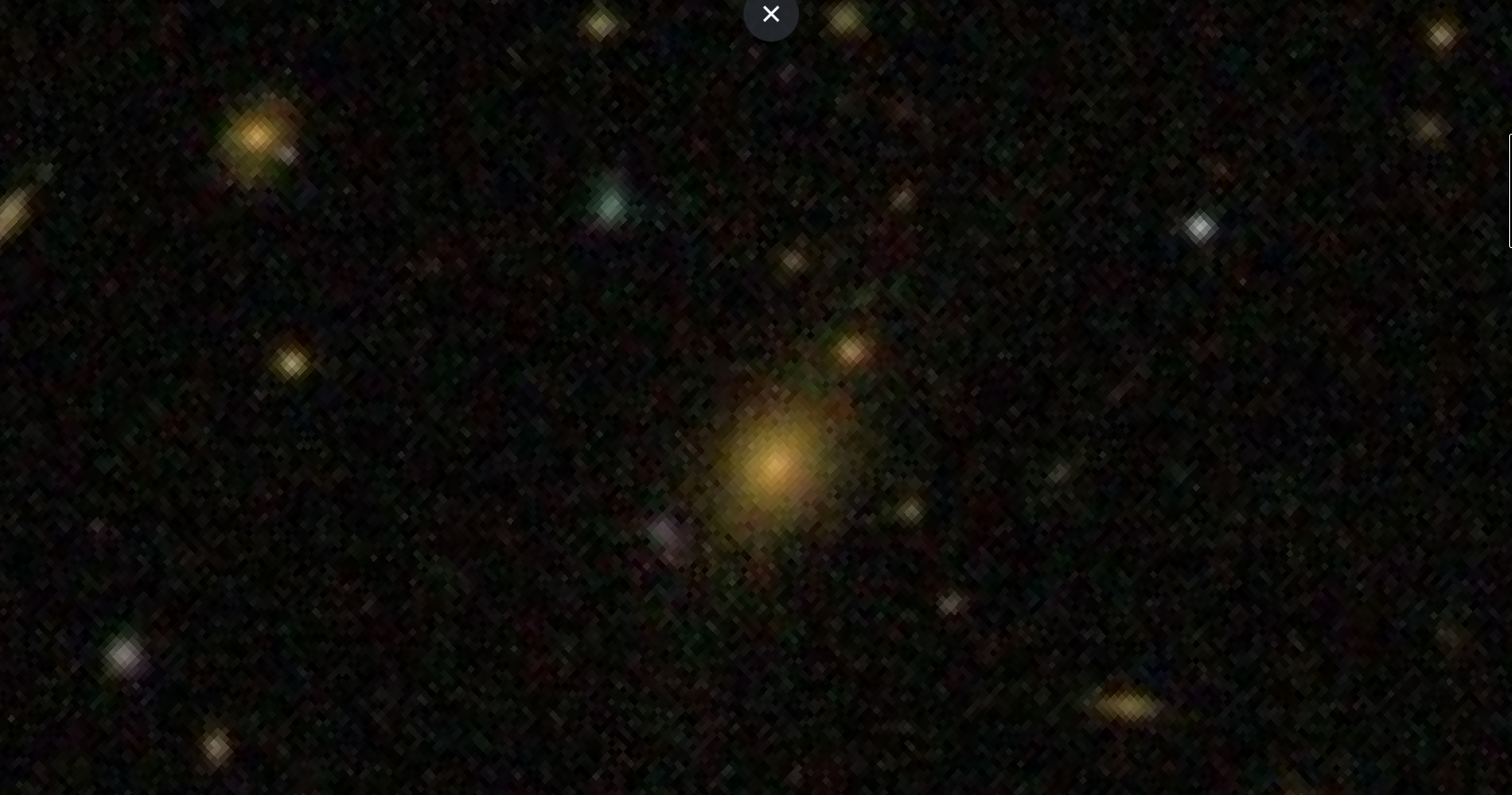
- SDSS image of 3C 28.

Observation data (J2000.0 epoch)
- Constellation: Pisces
- Right ascension: 00^{h} 55^{m} 50.60^{s}
- Declination: +26° 24′ 37.459″
- Redshift: 0.195298
- Heliocentric radial velocity: 58,549 km/s
- Distance: 2.513 Gly
- Group or cluster: Abell 115
- Apparent magnitude (B): 18.63

Characteristics
- Type: E; BrCIG LERG
- Size: ~410,000 ly (125.70 kpc) (estimated)

Other designations
- 4C +26.02, PKS 0055+26, LEDA 138263, RBS 0131, 2MASX J00555058+2624366, DA 028, CTA 008, TXS 0053+261, NRAO 048

3C 28 is a massive Type-cD elliptical galaxy located in the constellation of Pisces. It has a redshift of (z) 0.1971, meaning it is located 2.5 billion light-years from Earth and was discovered in 1959. It is the brightest cluster galaxy (BCG), residing in the center of the northern subcluster region of the merging galaxy cluster, Abell 115.

== Description ==
3C 28 is a low-excitation Fanaroff-Riley class type II radio galaxy with a total radio luminosity of 2.3 × 10^{26} W Hz^{−1} sr^{−1} at 178 MHz. The isophotal structure of the galaxy is classified as disky and its appearance elongated northwest to southeast direction. Its stellar population is mainly reddened and dominated by young stars aged around two billion years old. The star formation luminosity is estimated to be 5.3 × 10^{10} L_{SFIR}.

The source is classified as a classical bend double based on radio mapping. Its structure is unusual, with two compact components on located both sides of the galaxy displaying low-surface brightness tails. Two radio jets are connected together with the structure by a pair of radio lobes. Radio imaging has shown there is a faint, narrow filament present, crossing the gaps of the lobes and passing its nucleus position. The spectral index of one of the components is noted as steepening.

Imaging showed both components of the source display a fair bit of polarization. The fractional polarization of component A has been calculated as 9 ± 2% at 60° whereas component B has a fractional polarization degree of 8 ± 2% at 25%. However, 1.4 GHz data reanalysis have found the source is unpolarized at polarization percentage of 2%.

Further observations have found the lobes and the radio structure of the galaxy are mainly confined by interstellar medium, indicative of the radio tails displaying extended structures towards the west, suggesting by buoyancy effects. Evidence also showed there is a misalignment between the optical galaxy and its radio components in addition to its extended tails, meaning ram pressure also played a role as well. High luminosity X-ray emission was also found centering on the galaxy with a gas mass of 10^{11} M_{☉} and a short cooling time period of 5 × 10^{8} per year. These characteristics of X-ray emission are caused by the effects of thermal bremsstrahlung.

The galaxy can be classified as a remnant radio galaxy. Based on data observations, it shows an absence of a radio core, suggesting its active galactic nucleus ceased its activity between 6 and 9 million years ago. This causes the lobes' brightness to slowly dim out through adiabatic and radiative losses.
