= PKS 0428+205 =

Radio galaxy located in the constellation of Taurus

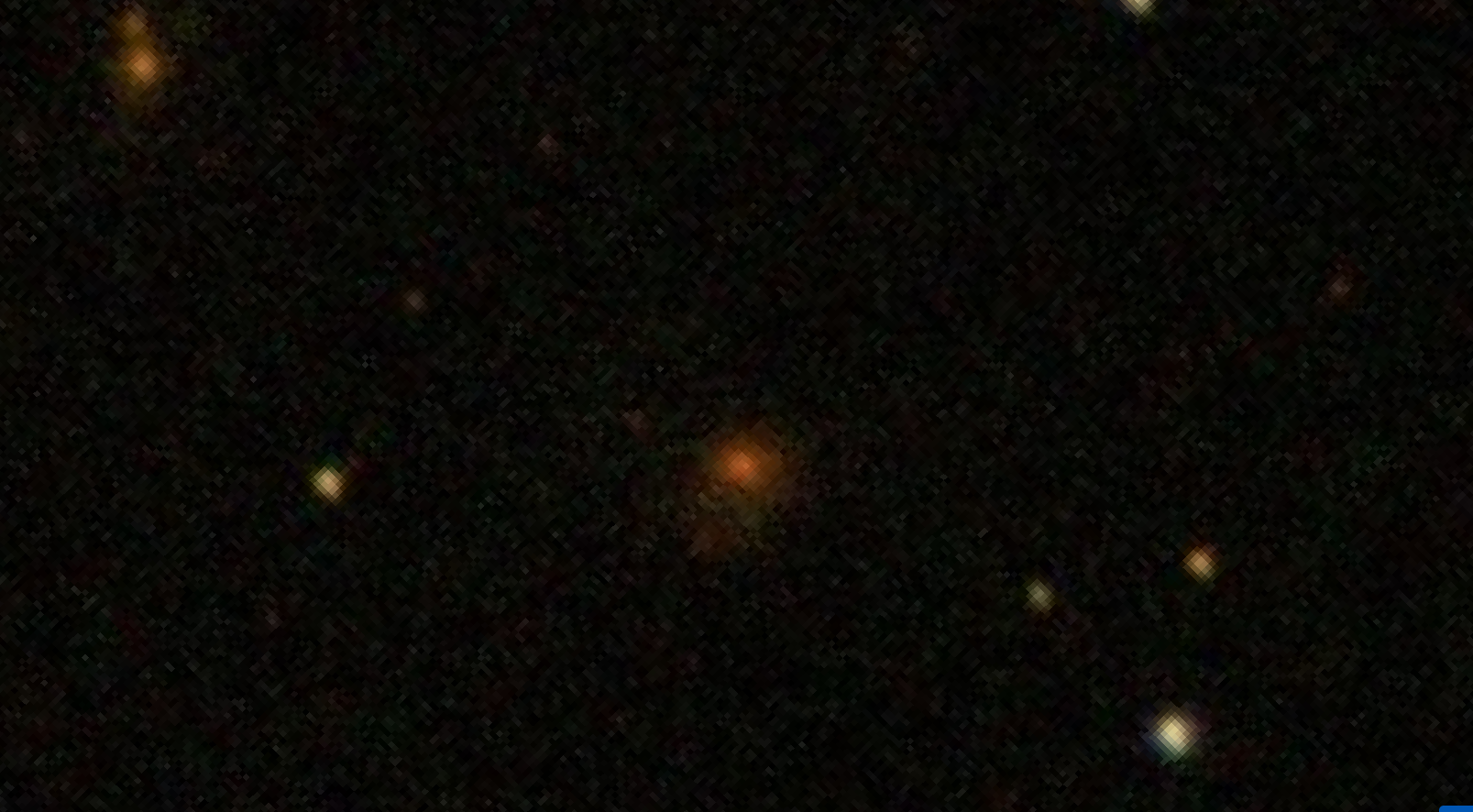
- SDSS image of PKS 0428+205

Observation data (J2000.0 epoch)
- Constellation: Taurus
- Right ascension: 04^{h} 31^{m} 03.76^{s}
- Declination: +20° 37′ 34.26″
- Redshift: 0.220200
- Heliocentric radial velocity: 66,014 km/s
- Distance: 2.723 Gly
- Apparent magnitude (B): 22.17

Characteristics
- Type: CSS
- Size: ~307,900 ly (94.39 kpc) (estimated)

Other designations
- NVSS J043103+203734, OF +247, DA 138, 2MASX J04310377+2037346, TXS 0428+205, PKS J0431+2037, IERS B0428+205, VLSS J0431.0+2037

PKS 0428+205 known as OF 247, is a radio galaxy located in the constellation of Taurus. The redshift of the galaxy is (z) 0.220 and it was first discovered as an extragalatic compact source in October 1971 by astronomers. It is classified as a compact steep spectrum (CSS) object.

== Description ==
PKS 0428+205 displays a gigahertz-peaked radio spectrum at various frequencies. Its source is classified as compact, with radio emission separating into two individual components based on radio imaging made by the Very Large Array (VLA). Another component described as both faint and extended is located 30 milliarcseconds away in the position angle of -30° and has a flux density of 120 mJy.

The radio core of PKS 0428+205 is described as elongated along the position angle of -35° with some evidence of a lower surface brightness extension extending towards the northwest. Observations with Very Long Baseline Interferometry (VLBI) at 5 GHz frequencies found there is an undetected northern radio lobe and southern radio lobe that is mainly dominated by a hotspot feature located at a distance of 175 parsecs from the core. An arc of emission can be seen extending in an eastern direction from the northern hotspot. The radiative age of the source is estimated to be 1.2 × 10^{3} years.

The host galaxy of PKS 0428+205 is a large normal elliptical galaxy, based on its absolute magnitude and surface brightness profiles not displaying the same characteristics like brightest cluster galaxies. Imaging made with Hubble Space Telescope (HST) described it having a reddened nucleus and is surrounded by a halo mainly extending in the directions of both south and east. There are also fainter objects located within the space of 10 arcseconds A study published in 2013 suggested PKS 0428+205 might be a young radio galaxy in the midst of an early evolution stage.
