= WISEA J085845.08+171002.6 =

Radio galaxy in the constellation Cancer

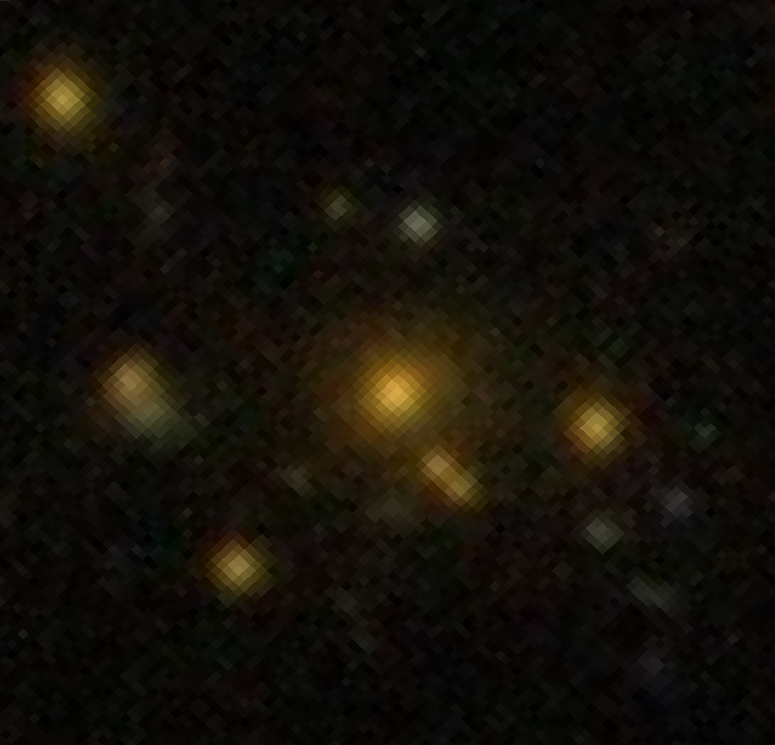
- SDSS image of WISEA J085845.08+171002.6

Observation data (J2000.0 epoch)
- Constellation: Cancer
- Right ascension: 08^{h} 58^{m} 45.08^{s}
- Declination: +17° 10′ 02.66″
- Redshift: 0.330251
- Heliocentric radial velocity: 99,007 ± 16 km/s
- Distance: 4,776.3 ± 334.3 Mly (1,464.41 ± 102.51 Mpc)
- Group or cluster: WHL J085845.1+171003
- magnitude (J): 15.30

Characteristics
- Type: FR II
- Size: ~352,000 ly (107.9 kpc) (estimated)

Other designations
- 2MASX J08584510+1710037, 2XMMI J085845.2+171001, [LHC2018] J134.68797+17.16753, VLSS J0858.7+1709, SDSS J085845.10+171003.1, [YHW2016] J134.68794+17.16752, WHL J085845.1+171003 BCG, LEDA 3736211

WISEA J085845.08+171002.6 also known as [SBP2022] J0858+1710 and J085845.10+171003.1, is a radio galaxy located in the constellation of Cancer. The redshift of the galaxy is estimated to be (z) 0.330.

== Description ==
WISEA J085845.08+171002.6 is a red luminous galaxy residing as the brightest cluster galaxy of the WHL J085845.1+171003 galaxy cluster with 15 confirmed galaxy members. The R-band magnitude of the galaxy has been estimated to be 17.81 magnitude.

The nucleus is active and it is either a bent-tailed or a wide angle-tail Fanaroff-Riley Class Type II radio galaxy characterized by its radio lobes displaying an opening angle that exceeds 90° and has a radio flux density of 59.10 mJy that is calculated by NRAO VLA Sky Survey (NVSS). The total radio power of the source is 24.71 × 10^{24} WHz^{−1}.

There is a radio jet with the jet opening angle estimated to be 97.5° and the jet curvature radius is measured to be 14.4 arcseconds in total. The largest angular size of the source is 43 arcseconds while the largest known linear size is 211 kiloparsecs. The radio spectral index is 0.69α between 3 GHz and 4 GHz frequencies while the 3 GHz flux density is 40.15 mJy. The g–r color value of the galaxy is 1.71 magnitude.

A study published in 2015, found it is a C-shaped radio galaxy located in a moderately galaxy environment with a total radio luminosity of 25.38 W Hz-1 with the total extent of the source being 0.15 megaparsecs making it a small. The absolute magnitude of the galaxy has been calculated to be -23.66. The total stellar mass of the galaxy has been estimated as 11.48 M_{☉} with the radio luminosity at 1.4 GHz being 25.30 W Hz^{−1}. The rest-frame r^{0.1} magnitude is -23.12.
