= SDSS J1108+0659 =

Seyfert 2 galaxy in the constellation Leo

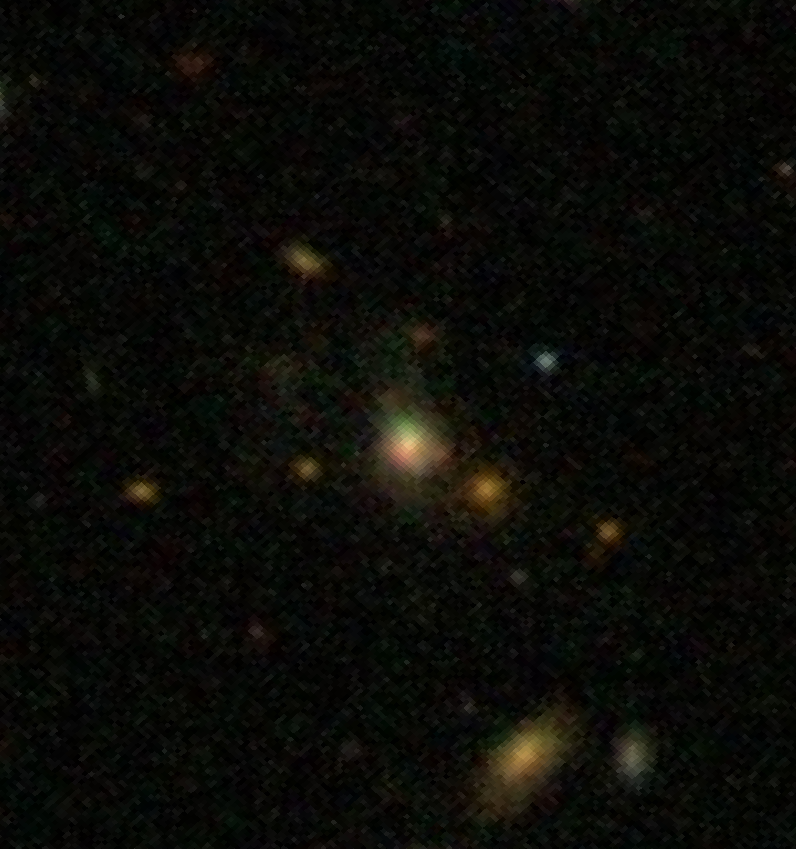
- The Seyfert 2 galaxy SDSS J1108+0659

Observation data (J2000.0 epoch)
- Constellation: Leo
- Right ascension: 11^{h} 08^{m} 51.03^{s}
- Declination: +06° 59′ 01.24″
- Redshift: 0.181612
- Heliocentric radial velocity: 54,446 km/s ± 5
- Distance: 2.323 Gly
- Apparent magnitude (V): 18.45

Characteristics
- Type: QSO2
- Size: ~223,000 ly (68.3 kpc) (estimated)

Other designations
- 2MASX J11085103+0659014, ASK 232974.0, NVSS J110850+065900, QFeedS J1108+0659, SDSS J110851.02+065901.4 LEDA 3470565

SDSS J1108+0659 also known as SDSS J110851.04+065901.4, is an active type 2 Seyfert galaxy and a radio-quiet quasar located in the constellation of Leo. The redshift of the galaxy is (z) 0.181 and it was first discovered by astronomers in 2010 from the Sloan Digital Sky Survey (SDSS), based on emission lines in its optical spectrum. This galaxy is known to host two active galactic nuclei.

== Description ==
SDSS J1108+0659 is in the early stages of a major galaxy merger. It has a low surface brightness component that is described as extended and is located in an eastern direction from the host galaxy. There are also blue clump regions in the western direction. Two nuclei can be seen, one in each component of the galaxy, however one is blue and the other is red. The central supermassive black hole of the northwestern component is estimated to be 8.31 M_{☉} while the central supermassive black hole of the southeastern component is around 8.05 M_{☉}. The total luminosities of each nuclei are estimated to be 45.24 erg s^{−1} and 44.02 erg s^{−1} respectively.

The radio structure of SDSS J1108+0659 is compact. When observed with the Very Large Array (VLA) on sub-arcsecond resolution at both 5.0 and 8.5 GHz frequencies, it is made up of three components. A central component is resolved, with a bright appearance and an elongation at the position angle of 113°. There is also a tail feature made up of radio emission, extending more than one arcsecond, on the southwest direction away from the central component and has a steep spectral index. On the northwest side, there is another component that clearly resolved with a flux density of 0.38 mJy.

There is also evidence of the presence of ultraviolet continuum emission mainly centering on the northwestern nucleus, extending in the same position angle as the doubly ionized oxygen emission. An outflow is detected with a full width at half maximum of 813 ± 25 kilometers per second and is also being blueshifted in respect to the narrow dominant component.
