= IRAS 23389+0300 =

Galaxy in the constellation of Pisces

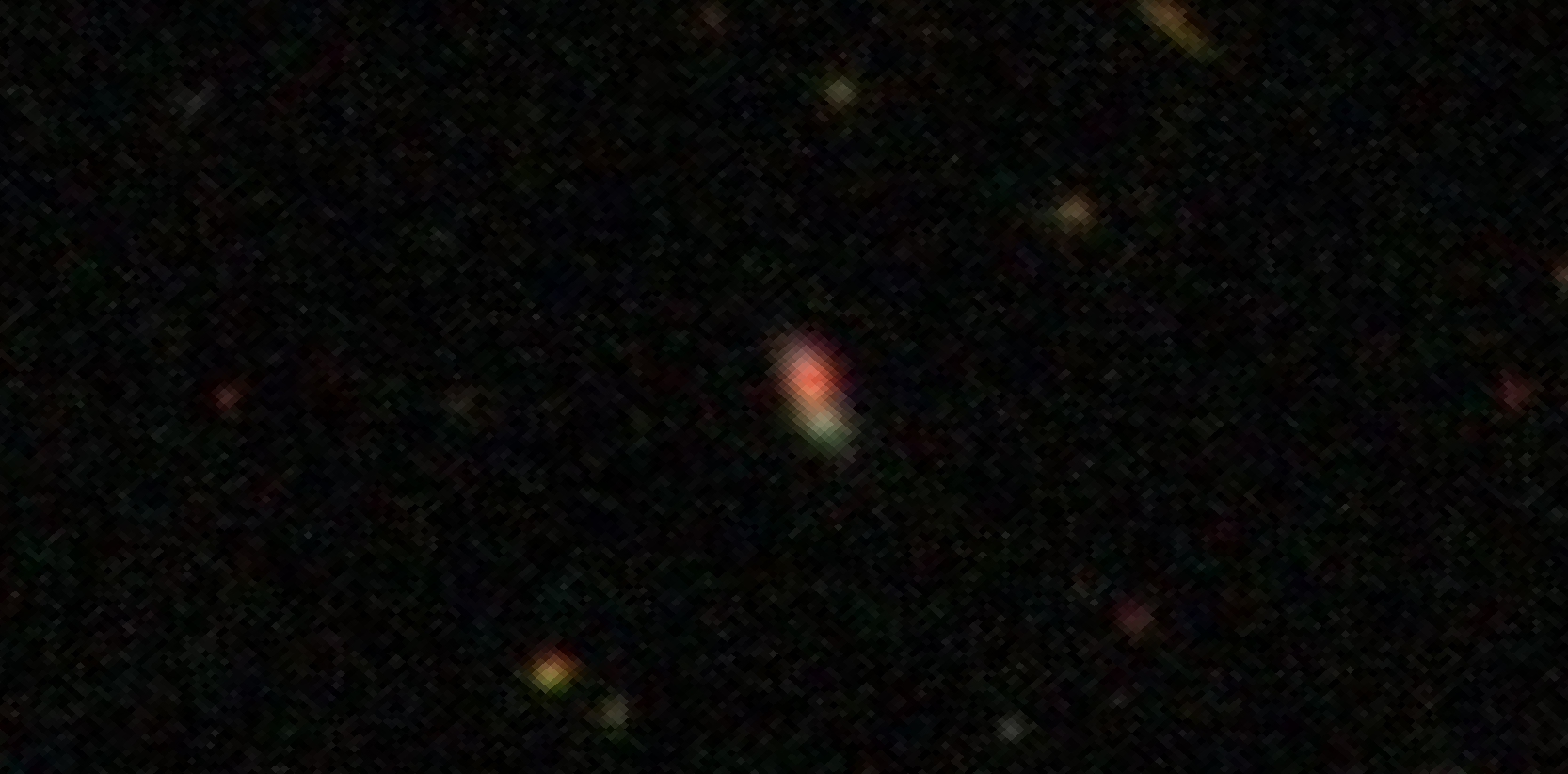
- SDSS image of IRAS 23389+0300

Observation data (J2000.0 epoch)
- Constellation: Pisces
- Right ascension: 23^{h} 41^{m} 30.31^{s}
- Declination: +03° 17′ 26.55″
- Redshift: 0.145000
- Heliocentric radial velocity: 43,470 km/s
- Distance: 1.877 Gly
- Apparent magnitude (V): 20.0

Characteristics
- Type: ULIRG Sy2

Other designations
- IRAS F23389+0300, 4C +03.60, 2MASS J23413033+0317267, LEDA 90432, PKS J2341+0317, NVSS J234130+031726, OZ +066, 87GB 233856.4+030039

IRAS 23389+0300 is an ultraluminous infrared galaxy located in the constellation of Pisces. The redshift of the object is (z) 0.145 and it was first discovered in 1971 in the Parkes Catalogue of Radio Sources survey. With its total luminosity estimated to be 2.3 × 10^{12} L_{☉}, it is one of the most powerful infrared galaxies and a known radio galaxy. This object has also been described as a Type 2 Seyfert galaxy.

== Description ==
IRAS 23389+0300 is a pre-galaxy merger or a close binary system, with two nuclei estimated to be 5.2 kiloparsecs away from each other. While nothing is known about the southern galaxy, the northern galaxy of the system has been classified as compact with a highly reddened appearance. It is also the brightest galaxy of the two, detected in radio wavelengths. A short tidal feature can be seen south from both galaxies indicating they might on the verge of merging.

The nucleus on the northern galaxy of the system is found to be active and radio-loud, containing a gigahertz peaked spectrum (GPS). Its source is also described as having a radio core, extended radio emission and two radio lobes found as slightly resolved with a separation of 830 parsecs away. Optical and near-infrared imaging show the lobes centering on a point region near the northern nucleus. The radio spectrum of the source has been estimated having a spectral age of 0.68 million years.

The northern galaxy shows evidence of warm outflows in its nuclear regions. However based on observations, the oxygen and iodine emission lines are stronger when compared to the doubly ionized oxygen emission lines. The outflow model of the galaxy is described as having two components; a narrow component and a broad component being redshifted by around 47 ± 13 kilometer per second. A high density outflow was found with a mass outflow rates of 10.4^{+11.1}_{-5.1} M_{☉} per year and kinetic power of 0.63 percent. It is also suggested the outflow might be driven by its radio jet.

The total star formation rate of the system is estimated to be 100 ± 40 M_{☉} per year with the presence of very young stellar populations towards the north based on modelling results.
