= WISEA J095351.39+221531.7 =

Radio galaxy in the constellation Leo

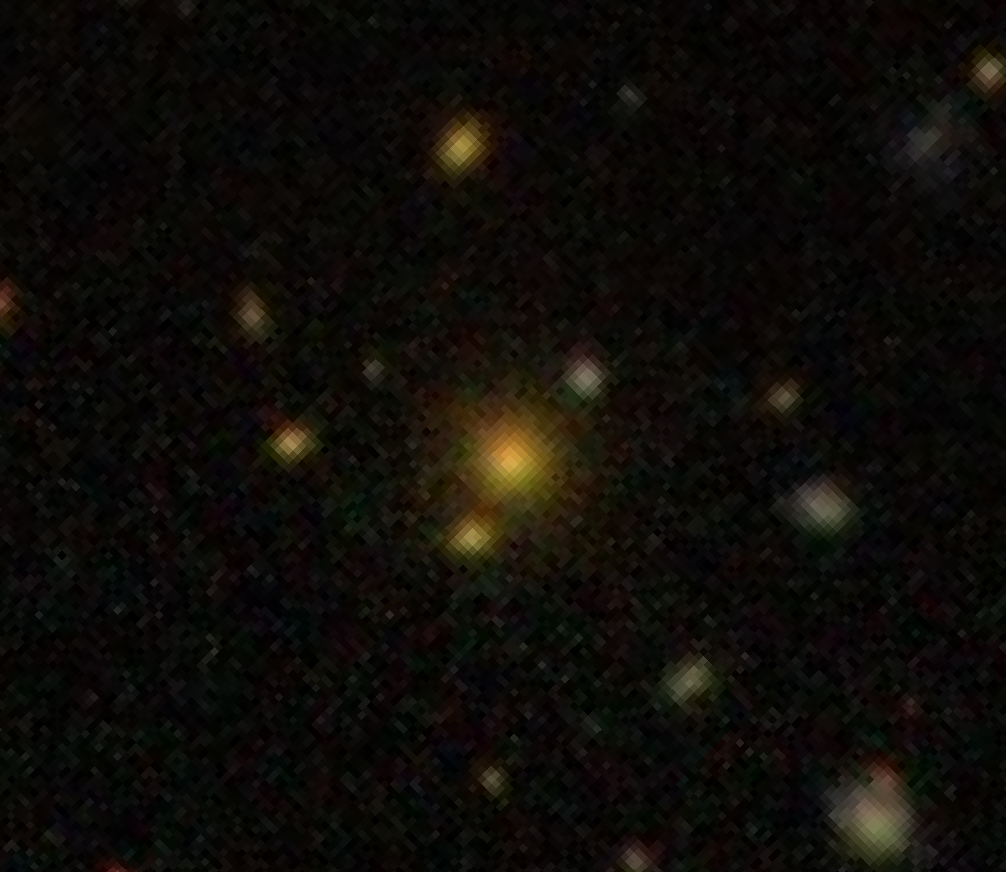
- SDSS image of WISEA J095351.39+221531.7

Observation data (J2000.0 epoch)
- Constellation: Leo
- Right ascension: 09^{h} 53^{m} 51.39^{s}
- Declination: +22° 15′ 31.76″
- Redshift: 0.264209
- Heliocentric radial velocity: 79,208 ± 17 km/s
- Distance: 3,825.0 ± 267.7 Mly (1,172.74 ± 82.09 Mpc)
- Group or cluster: GMBCG J148.46405+22.25892
- Magnitude (K): 13.90

Characteristics
- Type: BrClG
- Size: ~463,000 ly (141.9 kpc) (estimated)

Other designations
- 2MASX J09535137+2215319, GMBCG J148.46405+22.25892 BCG, LEDA 1666544, [LHC2018] J148.46406+22.25891, NVSS J095351+221533, NYU-VAGC 2251145, [VFK2015] J148.46423+22.25930

WISEA J095351.39+221531.7 also known as NYU-VAGC 2251145 and J095351.36+221532.1, is a radio galaxy located in the constellation of Leo. The redshift of the galaxy is estimated to be (z) 0.264.

== Description ==
WISEA J095351.39+221531.7 is a red luminous galaxy residing as the brightest cluster galaxy (BCG) of the galaxy cluster, GMBCG J148.46405+22.25892. The total absolute magnitude of the galaxy is estimated to be -23.20 magnitude while the g–r color value is 1.54 magnitude. A stellar mass of 11.29 h^{−2} M_{☉} has been calculated for the galaxy.

The nucleus is active and it has been categorized as a wide angle-tail (WAT) Fanaroff-Riley Class Type II radio galaxy. The total logarithmic luminosity is 25.27 W Hz^{−1} at 1.4 GHz frequencies and the radio spectral index is 0.61α between 3 and 1.4 GHz. A radio jet is resolved, with a jet opening angle of 145.5° and a jet curvature radius of 38.0 arcseconds. The largest angular size of the source is 45 arcseconds.

A study published in 2015 showed radio lobes are resolved ,with a total lobe flux density of 0.063 mJy and the radio core has a measured core flux density of 0.0187 mJy. The lobes are separated from each other by just 0.007526°. The total radio flux density for the source at 1.4 GHz is 87.9 mJy and the total radio luminosity is 25.26 W Hz^{−1}.

It is a class b radio galaxy, categorized as an early-type galaxy, with its stellar velocity dispersion calculated to be 292 kilometers per seconds and its effective radius is 12.8 kiloparsecs. The total physical size of the galaxy is 171 kiloparsecs. The total radio power at 1.4 GHz is 25.26 W Hz^{−1}.
