= 4C +00.58 =

Radio galaxy in the constellation Serpens

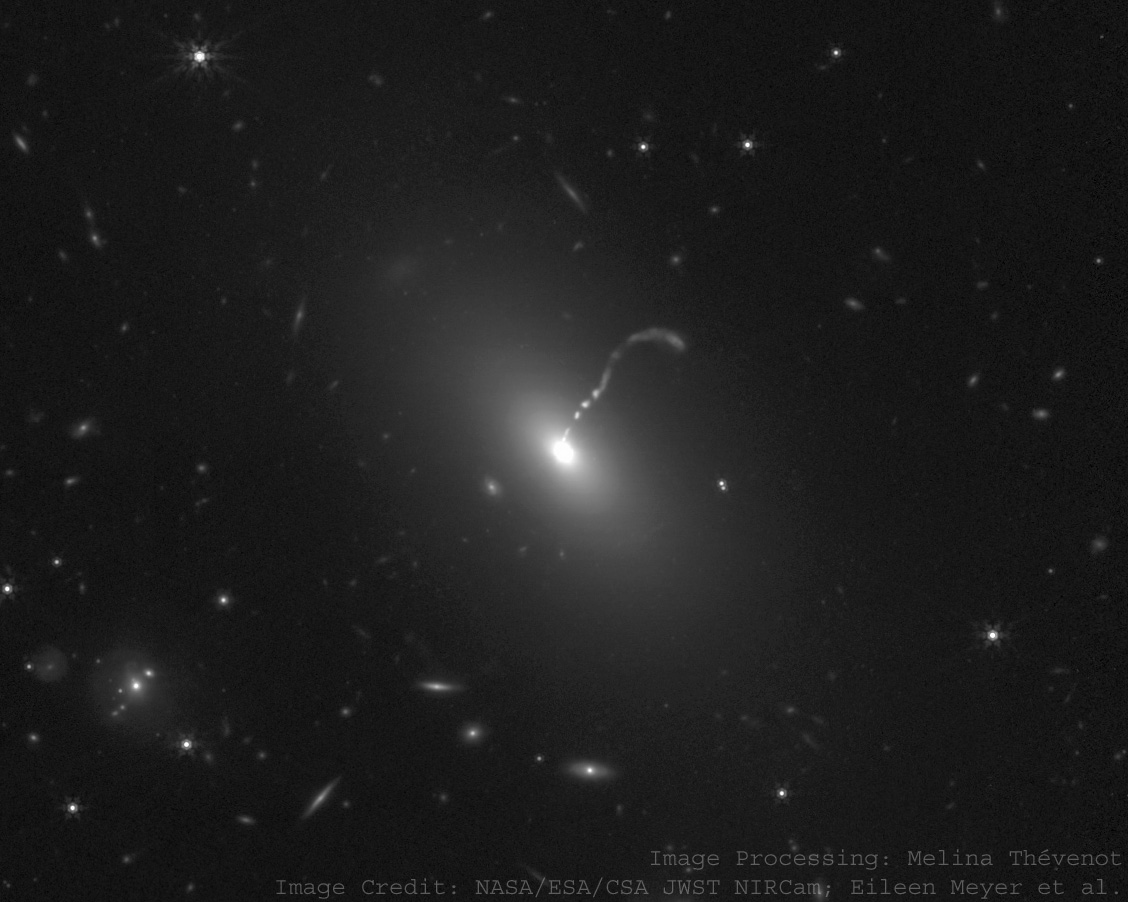
- Image of the galaxy and the jet with the James Webb Space Telescope instrument NIRCam

Observation data (J2000 epoch)
- Constellation: Serpens
- Right ascension: 16^{h} 06^{m} 12.6954^{s}
- Declination: +00° 00′ 27.229″
- Redshift: 0.059
- Distance: 855.9 ± 63.3 Mly (262.42 ± 19.40 Mpc)

Other designations
- LEDA 84732, 2MASX J16061272+0000273, PKS 1603+00, SDSS J160612.68+000027.1

4C +00.58 is an X-shaped radio galaxy (XRG) with a detected jet. The galaxy was first identified as an XRG candidate in 2007 with the survey FIRST at 1.4 GHz. XRGs are thought to be the result of a merger of two galaxies that reorientate the spin axis of the central supermassive black hole. This reorientation is either induced by accretion torque or the merger of two supermassive black holes, causing a spin-flip. The reorientation creates outer wings that trace the past orientation of the jet and are located at a different angle compared to the inner jet. The jet has a notable bend at the tip. The rest of the jet is not entirely straight, but shows shows smaller bends, possibly a sign of precession.

Most XRGs have the jet aligned with the major axis of the galaxy and the outer wings aligned with the minor axis. 4C +00.58 is unusual, because the jet is aligned with the minor axis. The jet was also observed with the Chandra X-ray Observatory and has a size of 5 kiloparsecs. Chandra also detected cavities that trace the past orientation of the jet. Knots in the jet are detected with the Very Large Array at 5 GHz. The jet was also observed with Hubble.

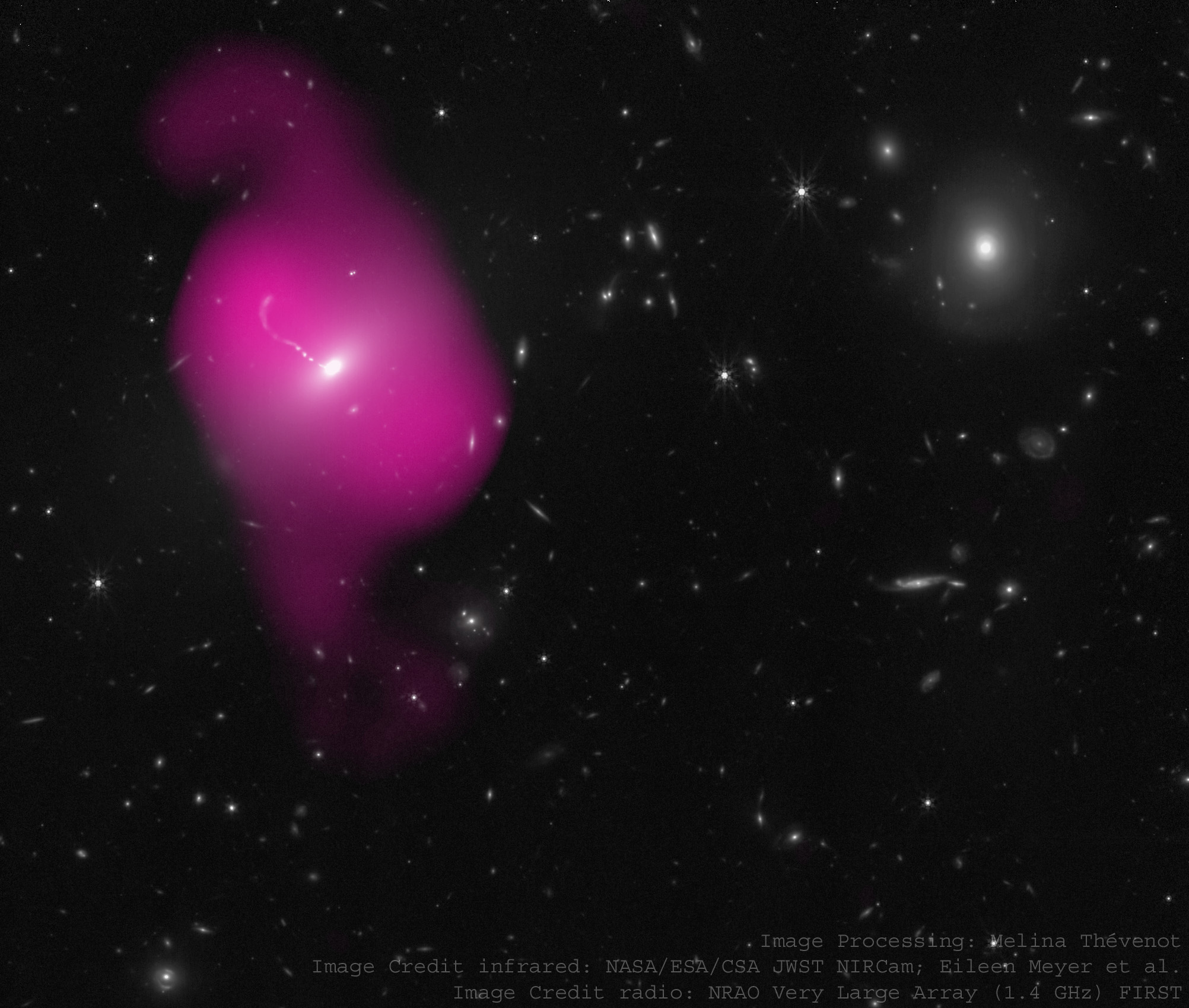
An image showing the FIRST image in pink and the JWST image in gray. The outer wings are seen extending far beyond the jet.
