= PKS 0625−53 =

Radio galaxy in the constellation Carina

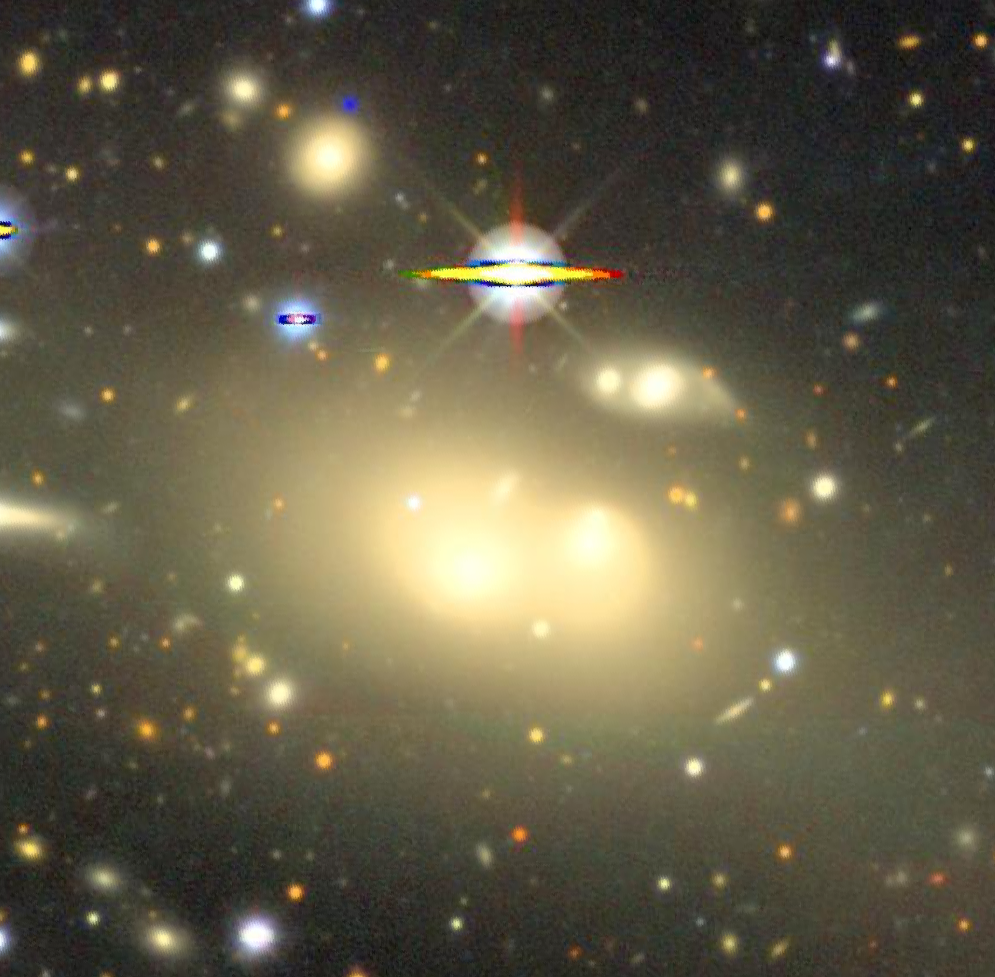
- The radio galaxy PKS 0625−53.

Observation data (J2000 epoch)
- Constellation: Carina
- Right ascension: 06^{h} 26^{m} 19.40^{s}
- Declination: −53° 41′ 34.48″
- Redshift: 0.053900
- Heliocentric radial velocity: 16,159 km/s
- Distance: 752 Mly
- Group or cluster: Abell 3391
- Apparent magnitude (V): 15.4

Characteristics
- Type: 2 E pec galaxies
- Size: ~227,100 ly (69.64 kpc) (estimated)

Other designations
- AM 0625−533, PGC 19045, ESO 161−IG 007, MRC 0625−536, PKS B0625−536, RX J0626.3−5342, SGC 0625−537, SUMSS J062621−534122

PKS 0625−53 also known as ESO 161−IG 007, is a low-excitation radio galaxy located in the constellation of Carina. The redshift of the object is (z) 0.053 and it was discovered by astronomers conducting the Parkes Catalogue of Radio Sources survey in September 1964. It is the brightest cluster galaxy located in the center of Abell 3391.

== Description ==
PKS 0625−53 is classified as a Fanaroff-Riley class Type I radio galaxy. The host galaxy is confirmed to be an elliptical galaxy and it makes the eastern half of the dumbbell galaxy system. There is a tidal feature which is interpreted as a broad tidal bridge connecting the two galaxies, thus confirming they are interacting with one another. There is also a large envelope structure surrounding the galaxy and other galaxies that are close to it.

Studies have shown PKS 0625−53 has a radio-loud active galactic nucleus (AGN) with the X-ray emission mainly concentrated in the eastern half. The central supermassive black hole mass of the galaxy is estimated to be 9.57 M_{☉}.

PKS 0625−53 has a wide-angle tail (WAT) structure with the two tails sharply bending at about 20 arcseconds north and 40 arcsececonds south of the nucleus. The radio jets that are opposite directed from the source, are also suggested as deflated mainly due to pressure gradients of the surrounding intercluster medium. The radio lobes of the source have no signs of depolarization. A study showed the northern lobe has a greater rotation measure gradient with a value of –430 rad m^{−2}. Radio imaging made by the Chandra X-ray Observatory found there is a decrease of emission in an overlapping area, hinting at an X-ray cavity.
