= CGCG 044-046 =

Type-cD galaxy in the constellation Virgo

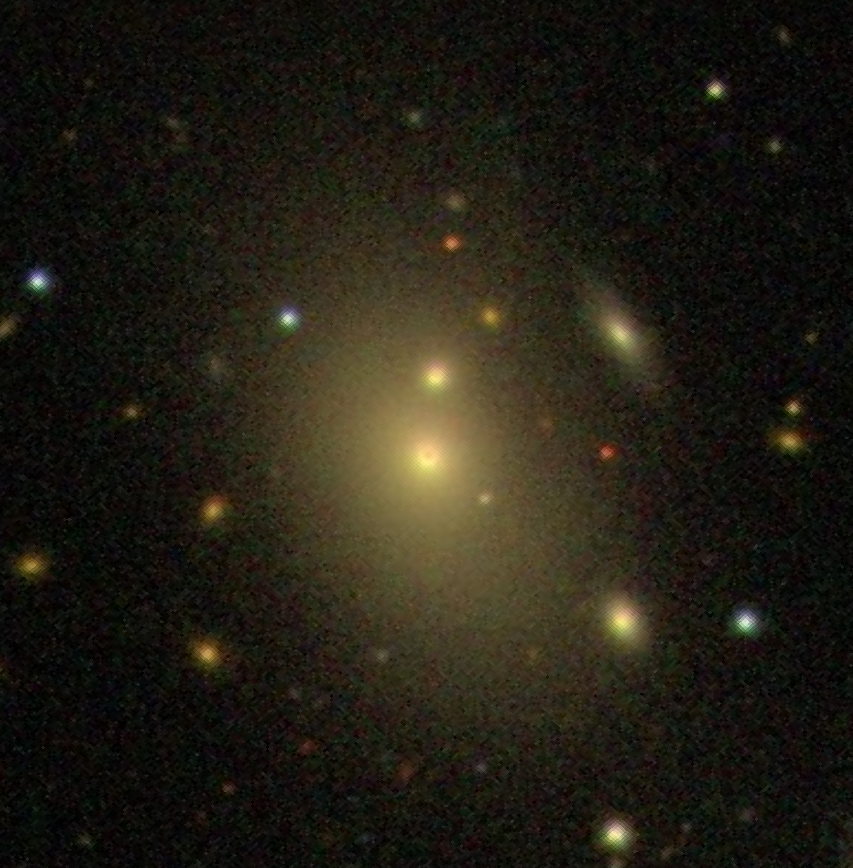
- SDSS image of CGCG 044-046

Observation data (J2000 epoch)
- Constellation: Virgo
- Right ascension: 13^{h} 16^{m} 17.02^{s}
- Declination: +07° 02′ 46.91″
- Redshift: 0.050246
- Heliocentric radial velocity: 15,063 km/s
- Distance: 722.5 ± 50.6 Mly (221.53 ± 15.51 Mpc)
- Apparent magnitude (B): 14.20

Characteristics
- Type: E+ pec
- Size: ~430,000 ly (131 kpc) (estimated)

Other designations
- 2MASX J13161700+0702465, 4C +07.32, CoNFIG 159, PKS B1313+073, PGC 46187

CGCG 044-046 is a Type-cD galaxy located in the constellation of Virgo. The redshift of the galaxy is (z) 0.050 and it was first discovered as an astronomical radio source by astronomers who were conducting the Parkes Catalogue of Radio Sources survey in 1966, where it was identified as PKS 1313+07. It is classified as a radio galaxy and is a member of a background galaxy cluster.

== Description ==
CGCG 044-046 contains a wide-angle tailed source. When observed by the Very Long Baseline Array (VLA), it is found to have an asymmetric structure with the tail feature on the eastern side of the source bending at a sharp angle at around 90° upon reaching 130 kiloparsecs from the site of the radio core. When observed on the western side, the tail is shown as bending in a gradual position, then narrowing before subsequently fading away. A radio map also found the tail features appear perpendicular to each other. The eastern knot feature is suggested to be polarized by 20 percent at around 20 centimeters.

Further radio imaging made in 1986, has discovered there is a radio jet present in the galaxy connecting between the radio core and the eastern hotspot that is located 70 kiloparsecs away from it. The eastern hotspot is more polarized by around 30 percent compared to the other hotspot located in the western direction. There is also an eastern component present with a rotation measure of 1 rad m^{−2}. The jet is estimated to have a velocity of 15000 kilometers per seconds. with the kinetic power of 4.7 × 10^{43} erg s^{−1}. An inner pair of jets are found with a straight appearance reaching 50 kiloparsecs from the core.

== Supernova ==
One supernova has been observed in CGCG 044-046: SN 2004bj (Type Ia, mag. 18.3) was discovered by the Lick Observatory Supernova Search (LOSS) on 22 April 2004.
