= ZwCl 3179 BCG =

Brightest cluster galaxy in the constellation Leo

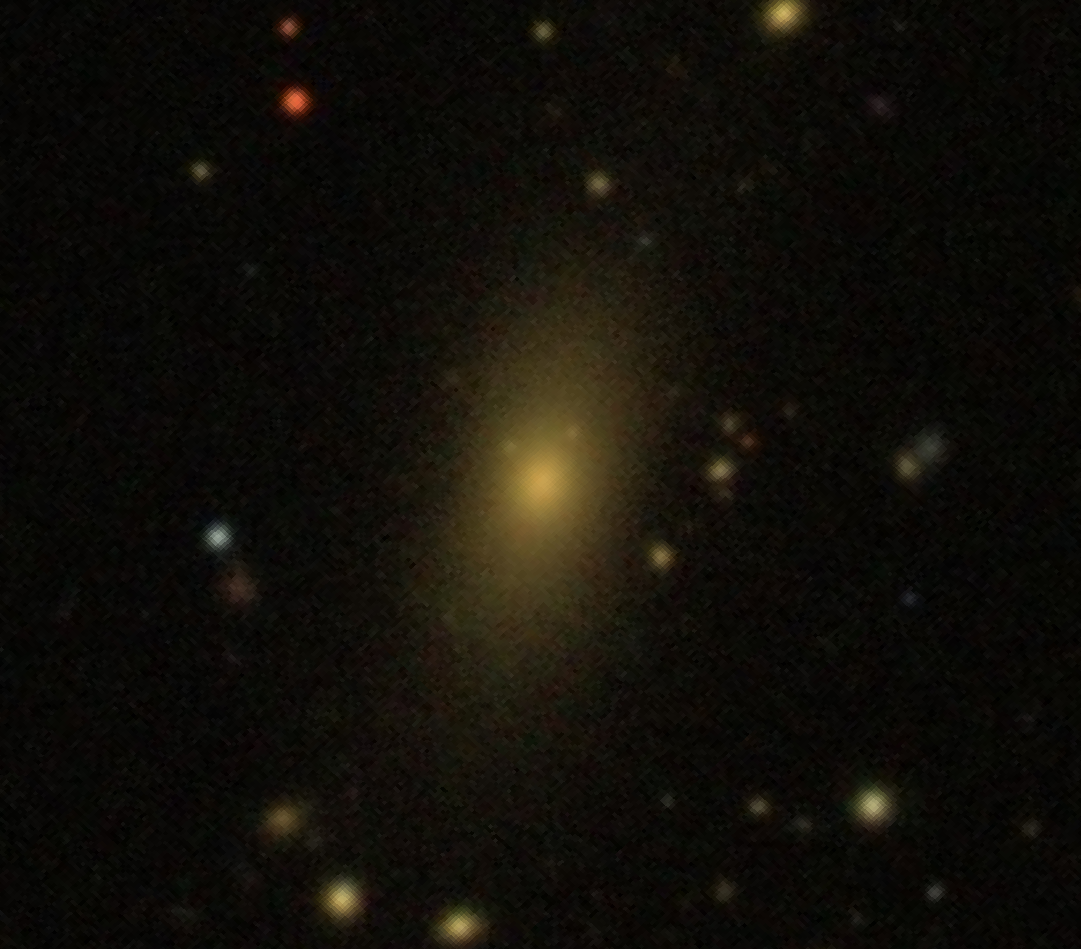
- SDSS image of ZwCl 3179 BCG

Observation data (J2000.0 epoch)
- Constellation: Leo
- Right ascension: 10^{h} 25^{m} 57.96^{s}
- Declination: +12° 41′ 08.51″
- Redshift: 0.142000
- Heliocentric radial velocity: 42,571 ± 5 km/s
- Distance: 2,061.0 ± 144.3 Mly (631.90 ± 44.23 Mpc)
- Group or cluster: ZwCl 3179
- magnitude (J): 13.21

Characteristics
- Type: BrClG
- Size: ~663,000 ly (203.2 kpc) (estimated)

Other designations
- 2MASX J10255796+1241086, 2CXO J102557.9+124109, eRASS1 J102557.9+124108 BCG, HeCS J102557.99+124108.4, LEDA 93940, MJV 00493, NVSS J102557+124107, RX J1025.9+1241:[AEF92], TXS 1023+129

ZwCl 3179 BCG (Short for Zwicky Cluster 3179 Brightest Cluster Galaxy) is a massive elliptical galaxy located in the constellation of Leo. The redshift of the galaxy is (z) 0.142 and it is the brightest cluster galaxy of the X-ray galaxy cluster ZwCl 3179.

== Description ==
ZwCl 3179 BCG is classified as a central cluster galaxy (CCG) of ZwCl 3179. The optical spectrum of the BCG displays both blue and red emission lines of nitrogen, sulfur, and oxygen, with the total hydrogen-alpha luminosity 40.92 erg s^{−1}. A spiral galaxy is located in the foreground in the northwest direction from the BCG separated by 110 arcseconds.

The total stellar mass of the BCG is 12.36 ± 0.09 M_{☉}, while the stellar velocity dispersion is 353 ± 14 kilometers per seconds. There is an emission line nebula within the BCG displaying quiescent gas, with the lines displaying a full width at half maximum (FWHM) of 482 ± 82 kilometers per second.

The BCG is a radio galaxy containing a compact radio source based on mJy imaging made with the Very Long Baseline Array (VLBA). The radio core has a total flux density of 24.6 mJy, while the non-core component at 1 GHz frequencies has a flux density of 146.6 ± 38.9 mJy with a flat spectral index of 0.2. The radio emission is also mainly core-dominated, with the total radio flux estimated as 94 mJy at 1.4 GHz.

The BCG is also an X-ray galaxy with a bright X-ray source shown to coincide with its position. The total X-ray luminosity of the source is 3.14 × 10^{44} erg s^{−1}.
