= J1223+5409 =

Seyfert type 1 galaxy in the constellation Ursa Major

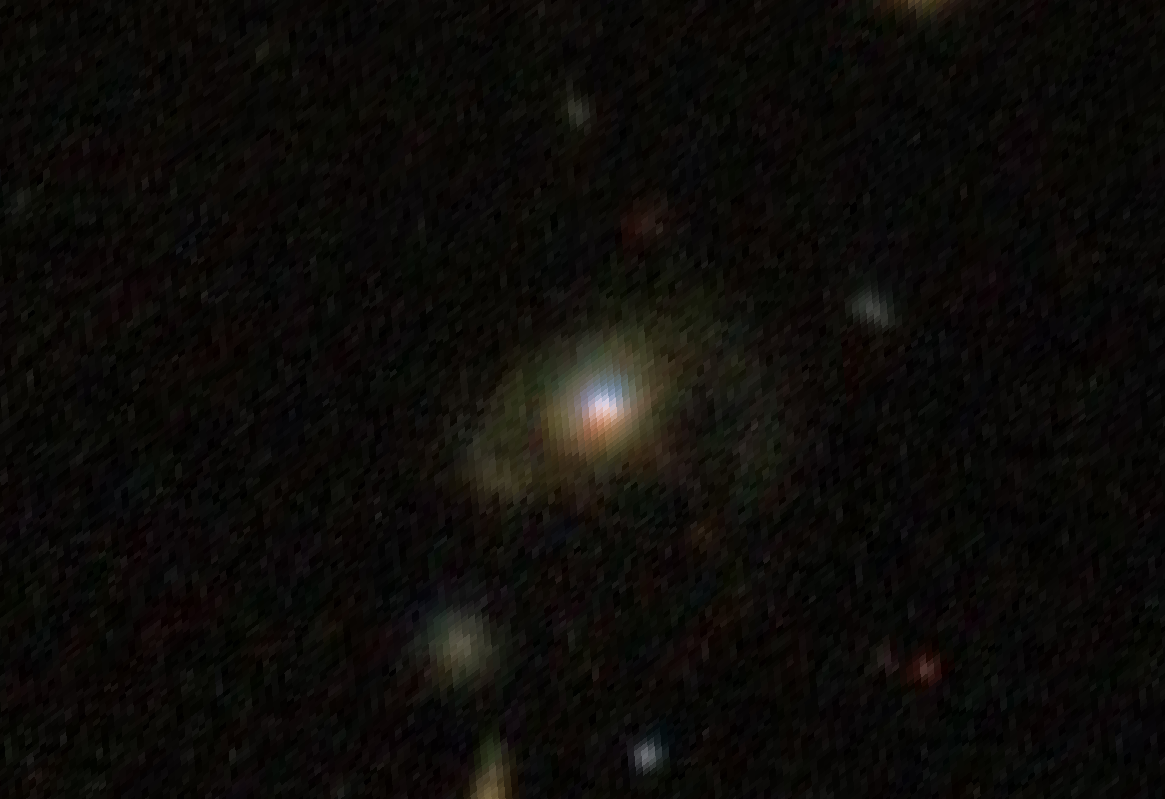
- SDSS image of J1223+5409

Observation data (J2000.0 epoch)
- Constellation: Ursa Major
- Right ascension: 12^{h} 23^{m} 13.21^{s}
- Declination: +54° 09′ 06.49″
- Redshift: 0.155871
- Heliocentric radial velocity: 46,729 ± 2 km/s
- Distance: 2,251.9 ± 157.6 Mly (690.44 ± 48.33 Mpc)
- magnitude (J): 15.08

Characteristics
- Type: Sy1.5
- Size: ~281,000 ly (86.1 kpc) (estimated)

Other designations
- 4C +54.27, 2MASX J12231312+5409060, 9C J1223+5409, PGC 40185, NVSS J122313+540907, RGB J1223+541, SBS 1220+544, SDSS J122313.21+540906.5

J1223+5409 also known as SDSS J122313.21+540906.5, is a type 1 Seyfert galaxy located in the constellation of Ursa Major. The redshift of the object is (z) 0.15 and it was first discovered by astronomers from the Second Byurakan Sky Survey (SBS) in April 1994 where it was designated as SBS 1220+544. It is classified to be radio-loud and such contains an active galactic nucleus (AGN).

== Description ==
J1223+5409 is a broad-line radio galaxy (BLRG) based on a spectroscopic identification of active galaxies from the RASS-Green Bank catalogue conducted in September 1998. The host galaxy has been classified as a disturbed elliptical galaxy with presence of both shell features and a tidal tail, suggestive of a galaxy merger.

A study published in November 2020, has found it is a dual active galactic nucleus (DAGN) candidate with both blueshifted and redshifted doubly ionized oxygen emission lines shown having a velocity offset of 232 kilometers per seconds. The singly ionized nitrogen (N II) and hydrogen alpha (Hα) emission lines in the galaxy's optical spectrum have total fluxes of 822 and 352 × 10^{−17} erg s^{−1} cm^{−2} respectively.

The radio structure of J1223+5409 is found to be very compact. When observed by both Very Large Array and Very Large Sky Survey (VLASS), it has a central radio core with a bipolar radio emission structure extending outwards from it. This structure detected by VLASS is suggested to have an elongated appearance along the radio axis direction and has an orientation of 21°. The total radio luminosity is estimated to be 25.4 W Hz^{−1}. A spectral index for the radio core component has been found to have a spectral index of -0.5 ± 0.3. The integrated flux densities for the two components at 15 GHz frequencies, are found to be 5.1 ± 0.5 and 0.7 ± 0.1 mJy.
