= J080107.90+435030.6 =

Radio galaxy in the constellation Lynx

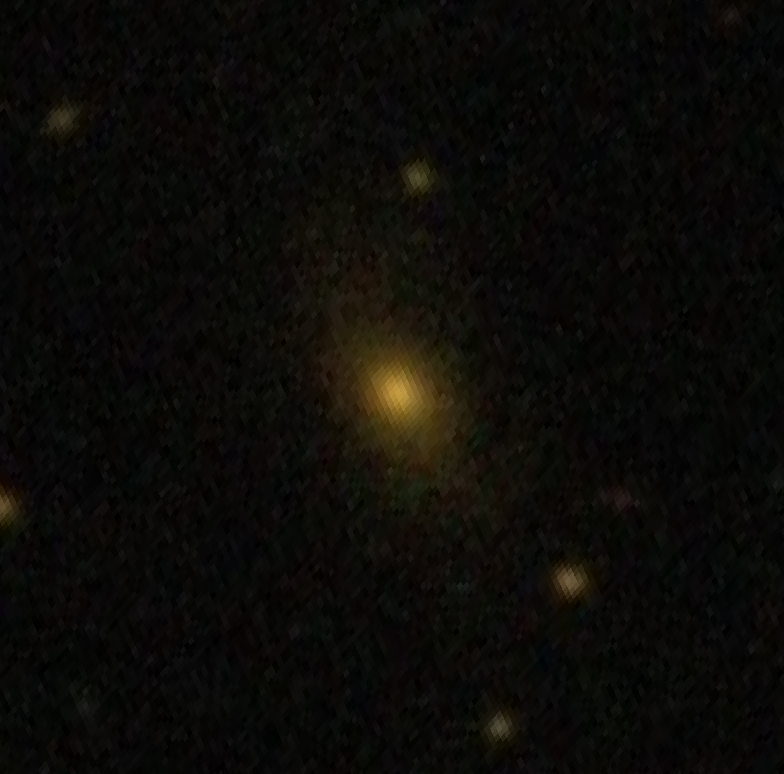
- SDSS image of J080107.90+435030.6

Observation data (J2000.0 epoch)
- Constellation: Lynx
- Right ascension: 08^{h} 01^{m} 07.90^{s}
- Declination: +43° 50′ 30.55″
- Redshift: 0.255348
- Heliocentric radial velocity: 76,551 ± 13 km/s
- Distance: 3,683.0 ± 257.8 Mly (1,129.22 ± 79.05 Mpc)
- magnitude (J): 15.29

Characteristics
- Type: FR II
- Size: ~462,900 ly (141.92 kpc) (estimated)

Other designations
- 2MASX J08010789+4350305, LEDA 2230468, SDSS J080107.90+435030.5, XRG J0801+4350, [YCH2015] J120.2829+43.8418

J080107.90+435030.6 also known as 6C B075738+435851, is a radio galaxy in the constellation of Lynx. The redshift of the galaxy is (z) 0.255 and it was first discovered from a sample of 2,712 radio-loud active galactic nuclei in the Sloan Digital Sky Survey (SDSS) in September 2005.

== Description ==
J080107.90+435030.6 is a Fanaroff-Riley Class Type II radio galaxy. The total angular size of the source is 26 arcseconds while the total linear size is 103.25 kiloparsecs. There are no detections of either a radio core or hotspot features.

A study published in 2016 found it is a broad-line radio galaxy. There are detections of both hydrogen-alpha and doubly ionized oxygen emission lines in its optical spectrum with estimated line luminosities of 6.899 and 6.740 L_{☉} respectively. The supermassive black hole residing in the center of the galaxy is found to 8.42 M_{☉}, while the accretion disk luminosity is 43.79 erg s^{−1}. A radio jet is present with an estimated power of 44.69 erg s^{−1}.

It is an X-shaped radio galaxy. The apparent r-band magnitude of the galaxy is 17.15, while the absolute magnitude is -23.06. It is also categorized as a bent-tailed radio galaxy which can be further classified as a wide angle-tail (WAT) radio galaxy. The total flux density at 1.4 GHz frequencies is 80.53 mJy while at 3 GHz frequencies, the flux density is 42.86 mJy. The curvature radius of the jet is 12.1 arcseconds. The g-r color value of the galaxy is 1.56 magnitude.
