= WISEA J142040.84+065059.8 =

Radio galaxy in the constellation Virgo

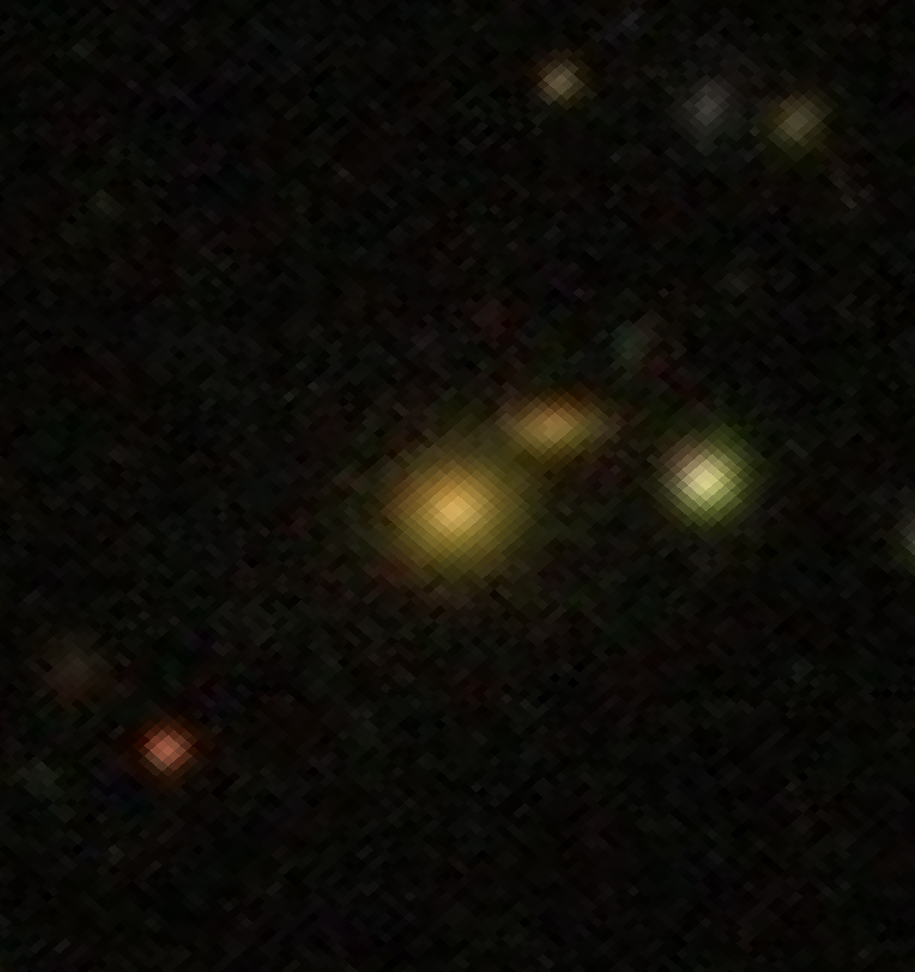
- SDSS image of WISEA J142040.84+065059.8

Observation data (J2000.0 epoch)
- Constellation: Virgo
- Right ascension: 14^{h} 20^{m} 40.84^{s}
- Declination: +06° 50′ 59.83″
- Redshift: 0.237539
- Heliocentric radial velocity: 71,213 ± 7 km/s
- Distance: 3,437.4 ± 240.6 Mly (1,053.92 ± 73.77 Mpc)
- Group or cluster: WHL J142040.9+065059
- magnitude (K): 13.63

Characteristics
- Type: SSRQ
- Size: ~533,000 ly (163.5 kpc) (estimated)

Other designations
- 1WGA J1420.6+0650, 2MASX J14204087+0650591, LEDA 2827947, DXRBS J1420.6+0650, [JBB2007] J142040.86+065059.5, MRC 1418+070, NVSS J142041+065102, SDSS J142040.86+065059.5, THING 587736525373309158, WHL J142040.9+065059 BCG, [YHW2016] J215.17027+06.84984

WISEA J142040.84+065059.8 also known as J142040.86+065059.5, is a radio galaxy located in the constellation of Virgo. The redshift of the object is (z) 0.237 and it was first discovered as a discrete radio source from the Molonglo Reference Catalogue by astronomers in February 1981, where it was designated as MRC 1418+070. It is categorized as a blazar and also a quasar.

== Description ==
WISEA J142040.84+065059.8 is a red luminous galaxy residing as the brightest cluster galaxy (BCG) of the galaxy cluster, WHL J142040.9+065059 with 13 confirmed galaxy member candidates. The r-band magnitude of the galaxy has been estimated as 17.45 magnitude. Its absolute magnitude has been estimated as -22.89. A supermassive black hole is present in the center of the galaxy with a mass of 8.64 M_{☉}.

The nucleus is active and has been classified as a bent-tailed radio galaxy of Fanaroff-Riley Class Type I subtype or an X-shaped radio galaxy. The total radio flux density has been calculated as 463.00 mJy by the NRAO VLA Sky Survey (NVSS) at 1.4 GHz frequencies. There is a radio jet with the jet opening angle estimated as 163.6° and the jet curvature radius is 52.5 arcseconds. The radio logarithmic luminosity is 26.07 W Hz^{−1}. The largest angular size of the source is 75 arcseconds whereas the largest linear size is 292.0 kiloparsecs. The total radio power is 90.34 × 10^{24} WHz^{−1}.

It is a weak blazar with a compact steep spectrum (CSS) source. The total flux density is 21.6 mJy and it has a core-jet structure with the core flux density being estimated to be 11.8 mJy. The major axis position angle of the source is 151°. It is also a steep spectrum radio quasar, mainly characterized by its steep radio spectrum.

A study published in 2015, has found it is an S-shaped radio galaxy with a source extent of 0.19 kiloparsecs. There is a possibility it might be a dual active galactic nucleus (AGN) candidate with both redshifted and blueshifted doubly ionized oxygen emission lines having a velocity offset of 253 kilometers per seconds.
