= SDSS J1239+5314 =

Type 1 Seyfert galaxy in the constellation Ursa Major

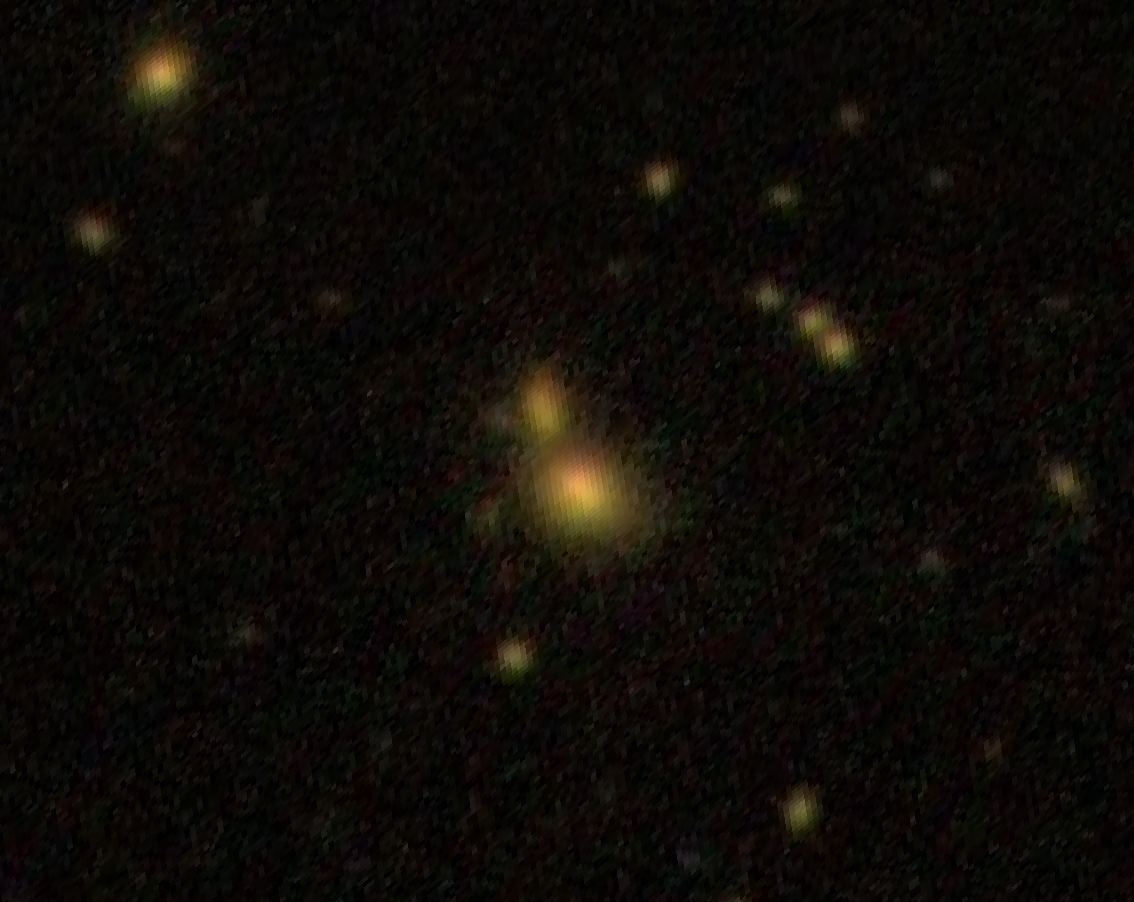
- SDSS image of SDSS J1239+5314

Observation data (J2000.0 epoch)
- Constellation: Ursa Major
- Right ascension: 12^{h} 39^{m} 15.39^{s}
- Declination: +53° 14′ 14.49″
- Redshift: 0.201624
- Heliocentric radial velocity: 60,445 ± 26 km/s
- Distance: 2,911.9 ± 203.8 Mly (892.79 ± 62.50 Mpc)
- Magnitude (J): 14.32
- Magnitude (H): 13.64

Characteristics
- Type: Candidate BLAGN
- Size: ~617,200 ly (189.22 kpc) (estimated)

Other designations
- 2MASX J12391544+5314147, 6C 123659+533024, LEDA 2435423, ILT J123915.5+531415.4, SDSS J123915.39+531414.6, 7C 123654.79+533036.00

SDSS J1239+5314 also known as SDSS J123915.40+531414.6, is a Type 1 Seyfert galaxy located in the constellation of Ursa Major. The redshift of the galaxy is (z) 0.201 and it was first discovered by astronomers in June 2010, whom they classified a double-peaked profile active galactic nucleus (AGN).

== Description ==
SDSS J1239+5314 is categorized as a Type 1 AGN. It is also a galaxy merger with the two nuclei estimated to be have a physical separation of 4.1 kiloparsecs away from each other. The total K-band magnitudes of the components are 14.4 and 14.8 respectively. The total rest frame radio luminosity at 5 GHz frequencies is estimated to be 24.1 W Hz^{−1}. Observations made in March 2011, showed it has a Fanaroff-Riley Type II morphology with a faint radio core. The total integrated flux density of the source is found to be 23.11 mJy. The star formation is estimated to be 6.0^{13.6}_{4.2} M_{☉} per year while the total stellar mass is 11.81^{0.53}_{0.59} M_{☉}.

A study published in 2015 has found there are two emission components present with the separation approximately around 1.3 kiloparsecs. When observed, the blueshifted component has a stellar bulge that is coincident with it, while the redshifted component does not. There is also another emission component present with a larger distance of 3.98 kiloparsecs and coincident with the stellar bulge of the southwest nucleus.

In 2022, the galaxy was found to be a confirmed X-shaped winged radio galaxy with the radio lobes being aligned from northeast to southwest direction. The position angle between the lobes is estimated to be 79°. Evidence also found the wing feature on southeast side is much longer compared to the northwestern wing.
