= 4C 61.23 =

Seyfert type 2 galaxy in the constellation Ursa Major

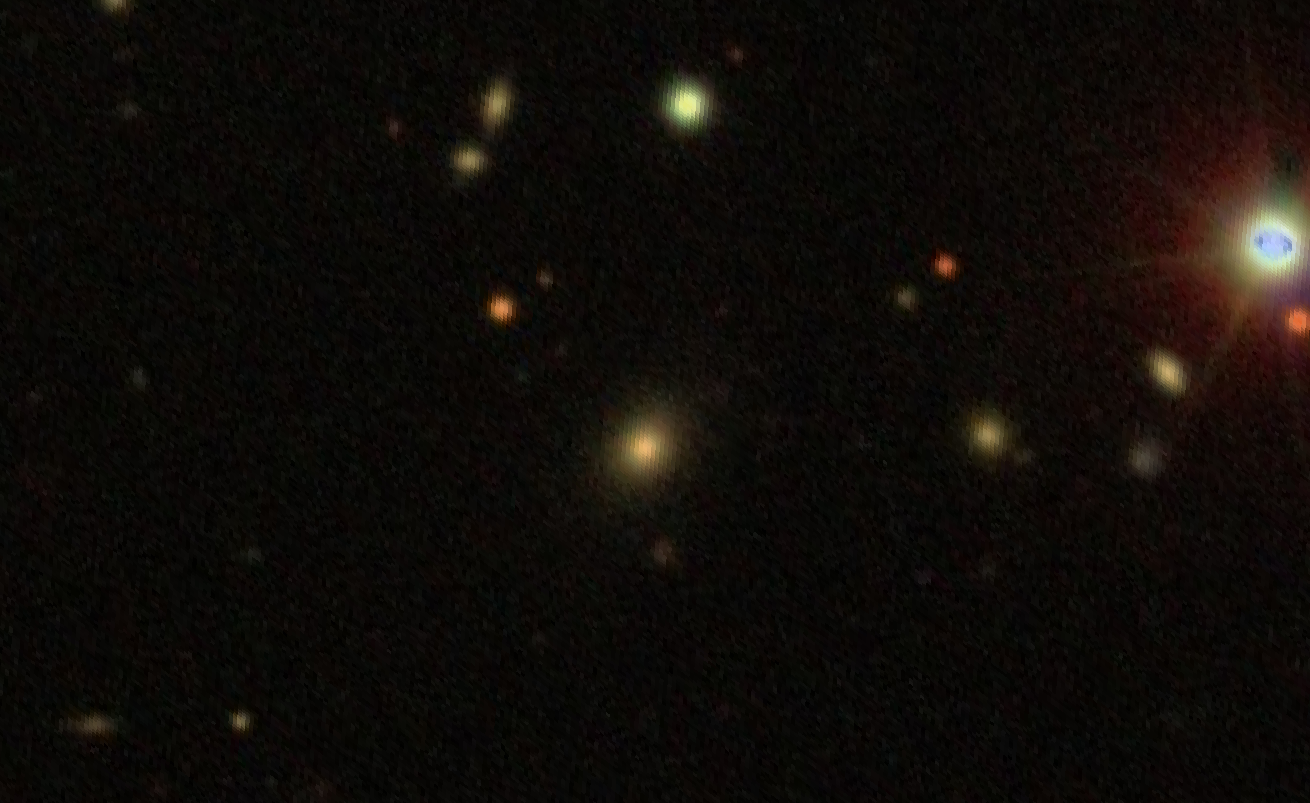
- SDSS image of 4C 61.23

Observation data (J2000.0 epoch)
- Constellation: Ursa Major
- Right ascension: 11^{h} 37^{m} 21.35^{s}
- Declination: +61° 20′ 01.15″
- Redshift: 0.111154
- Heliocentric radial velocity: 33,323 km/s
- Distance: 1.493 Gly
- Apparent magnitude (V): 13.07

Characteristics
- Type: FR II Sy2
- Size: ~160,000 ly (49.1 kpc) (estimated)

Other designations
- 2MASX J11372130+6120007, LEDA 2616039, CoNFIG 103, ASK 155914.0, 8C 1134+616, SDSS J113721.34+612001.4, TXS 1134+616, XRS J1137+6120

4C 61.23 is a Seyfert type 2 galaxy with an active galactic nucleus located in the constellation of Ursa Major. The redshift of the galaxy is estimated to be (z) 0.111 and it was first discovered as an astrophysical X-ray source in 1998 by astronomers who classified it as radio-emitting.

== Description ==
4C 61.23 is categorized as a Fanaroff-Riley Type 2 radio galaxy with a spheroidal galaxy host. It has presence of doubly-ionized peaked emission lines in its optical spectrum with the peaks mainly redshifted by 214 kilometers per seconds and blueshifted by 87 kilometers per seconds. In addition, the host galaxy displays no evidence of tidal interactions. The central supermassive black hole is estimated to be 8.37 ± 0.4 M_{☉}.

The radio structure of 4C 61.23 is considered as compact. When observed with Very Long Baseline Array (VLBA), it has a secondary component located two milliarcseconds away from the primary component. There are two radio lobes present with hotspot features at the ends of each lobe that have an orientation along the northwest to southeast directions. Studies also suggested strong backflows are evident from the lobes which in turn, are deflated in directions opposite from one another. A radio core is found at 400 MHz frequencies with a dimmed appearance.

A study published in 2024 have suggested 4C 61.23 is an X-shaped radio galaxy with dual compact components present. When observed, one of them appears to show an elongated appearance suggesting this as a core-jet structure while the component on the south-east side is indicated to be a secondary active galactic core. The separation of the components is estimated to be around 4.6 parsecs. A binary supermassive black hole may well be present inside the center of the galaxy.
