= UGC 8669 =

Radio galaxy located in the constellation Boötes

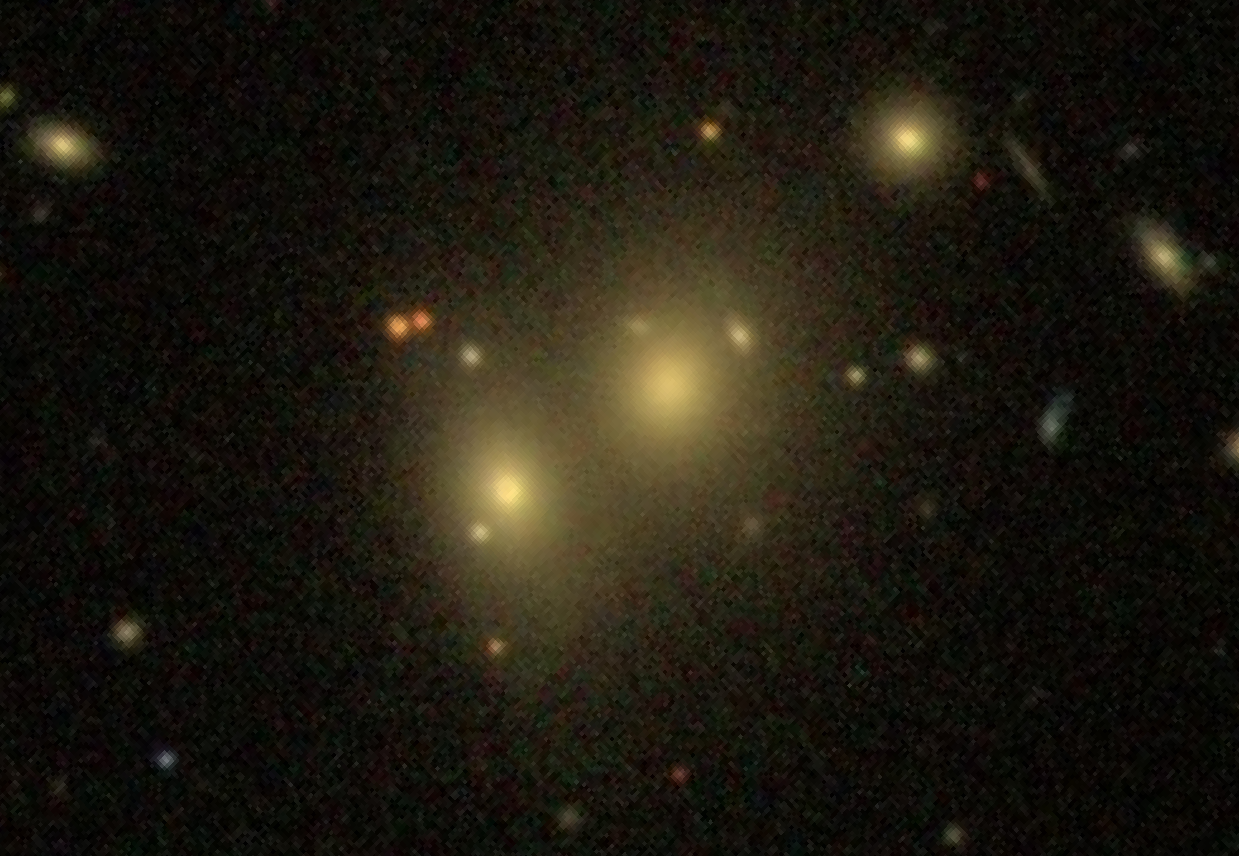
- SDSS image of UGC 8669.

Observation data (J2000.0 epoch)
- Constellation: Boötes
- Right ascension: 13^{h} 41^{m} 49.10^{s}
- Declination: +26° 22′ 21.01″
- Redshift: 0.075732
- Heliocentric radial velocity: 22,704 km/s
- Distance: 1.045 Gly
- Group or cluster: Abell 1775
- Apparent magnitude (V): 15.3

Characteristics
- Type: Elliptical;BrCLG
- Size: ~330,000 ly (100 kpc) (estimated)
- Notable features: Radio galaxy

Other designations
- VV 195b, MCG +05-32-063, CGCG 161-121 NED01, 2MASX J13414914+2622248, OGC 0935, KOS NP5 007, PGC 48495, 4C 26.41, B2 1339+26B

UGC 8669 known as UGC 8669 NED01 and B2 1339+26B, is a radio galaxy located in the constellation of Boötes. The redshift of the galaxy is estimated to be (z) 0.075 and it was first discovered by astronomers in 1971, later designated as 4C 26.41 in 1977. It is the brightest cluster galaxy (BCG), dominating the center of Abell 1775, an X-ray luminous and rich galaxy cluster.

== Description ==
UGC 8669 is classified as a Fanaroff-Riley class Type I radio galaxy. Its host is an elliptical galaxy with a small dark nuclear band. It is a giant double galaxy system pairing up with another elliptical galaxy UGC 8669 NED02 or B2 1339+26A, to collectively form VV 5-32-63/64. The two nuclei of the system are estimated to display a radial velocity difference of 1700 kilometers per seconds with the separation of approximately 30 kiloparsecs from each other. The total mass of the system is 2 × 10^{13} M_{☉} making it somehow larger comparing to the low limit of double galaxies located in clusters. Both of the galaxies in the system display strong forms of isophotal twisting with ellipticity variations, suggestive of a collision.

The galaxy has head-tail radio source with an extension of 380 kiloparsecs in extent. When imaged with Very Large Array, it has a head component showing an innermost structure found detected as an off-centered nucleus with two radio jets on opposite symmetry. The northeast jet is straight in the path of the tail direction while the southwest jet mainly displays a bend at 0.7 kiloparsecs. There is a radio core located southwards from a bright hotspot. The other galaxy B2 1339+26A has been classified as a double radio galaxy.

Recent observations have showed the galaxy has an unexpected increase of surface brightness in some of the tail regions suggesting its jets display a complex bend. There was also evidence that the spectral index is rising in an unexpected manner for some of the regions ranging between 1.37 ± 0.14 and 0.88 ± 0.14. Because the regions are situated close to a fossil plasma filament with an ultra-steep spectrum, it is likely the radio emission is contaminating the galaxy.

A tail extension has been discovered in the galaxy making the source longer with a collimated structure reaching up to 400 kiloparsecs, before breaking up and becoming diffused at the spot of a cold front. This might be suggested by dormant tail electrons displaying re-acceleration.
