= 7C 1354+2552 =

Quasar in the constellation Boötes

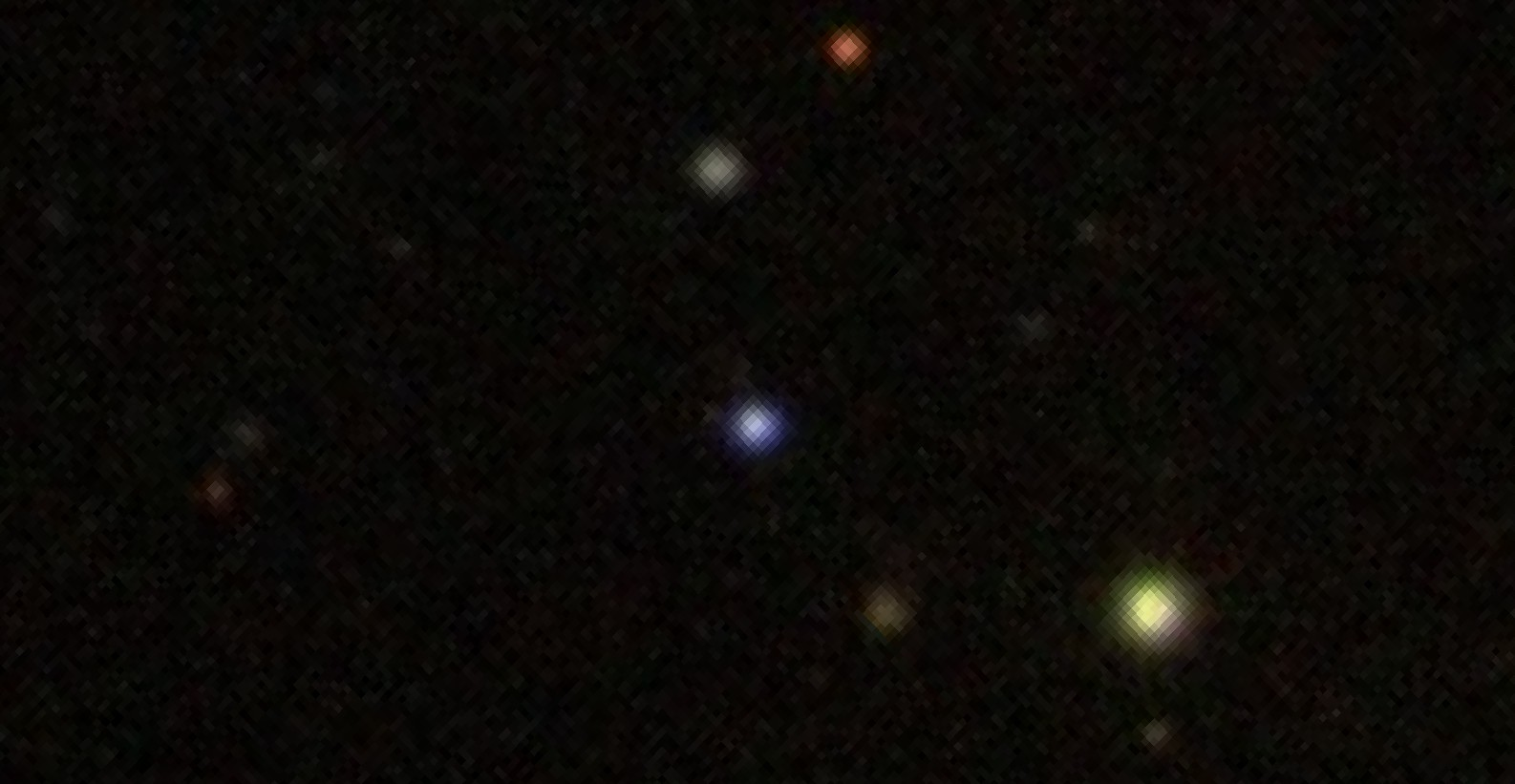
- SDSS image of quasar 7C 1354+2552

Observation data (J2000.0 epoch)
- Constellation: Boötes
- Right ascension: 13^{h} 57^{m} 06.45^{s}
- Declination: +25° 37′ 28.95″
- Redshift: 2.032000
- Heliocentric radial velocity: 609,178 km/s
- Distance: 10.097 Gly
- Apparent magnitude (V): 18.93
- Apparent magnitude (B): 19.13

Characteristics
- Type: QSO

Other designations
- B2 1354+25, PKS 1354+258, NVSS J135706+253726, Cul 1354+258, PKS J1357+2537, TXS 1354+258

7C 1354+2552 is a distant radio-loud quasar located in the constellation of Boötes. It has a redshift of (z) 2.032 and it was first discovered by astronomers in 1967 who were conducting a continuum survey using a radio telescope from the Ohio State University, designated as OP 291.

== Description ==
7C 1354+2552 has a compact radio structure. It displays two radio jets perpendicular to each other, with the north to south jet having a length of 86 kiloparsecs while the jet on the east to west side has a measured length of 24 kiloparsecs. There is an easternmost component located in one of those jets based on Very Large Array (VLA) observations. The quasar also has two outer hotspots which in turn are orientated in the position angle of 17°.

The host galaxy of 7C 1354+2552 is classified as disk galaxy with a star formation rate of 29 ± 3 M_{☉} per year based on a hydrogen alpha emission line luminosity. Further observations on the modelling of its rotating disk, found there is a blueshifted component located south-east and a redshifted component located north-west with full-width at half maximum measurements of 357.2 ± 2.0 km s^{−1} and 497.7 ± 6.5 km s^{−1} respectively. There is also a nearby companion galaxy located south-east clearly detected in emission lines.

7C 1354+2552 is surrounded by a Lyman-alpha emission nebula. It is asymmetric, with most of the radio emission found to originate both east and south of the quasar. In addition, it displays an ionized outflow on spatial scales of 1 kiloparsec with detections of molecular gas emission towards the northeast. A molecular gas inflow rate for 7C 1354+2552 was calculated as 200 M_{☉} per year with velocity of 180 kilometers per seconds. Two absorption lines of doubly ionized nitrogen and triply ionized silicon are identified in the quasar's spectra. In 1999 VLA detected emission from the quasar, with its 4 GHz peak flux reaching 173.68 mJy.
