= PKS 0043−42 =

Active galactic nucleus in the constellation Phoenix

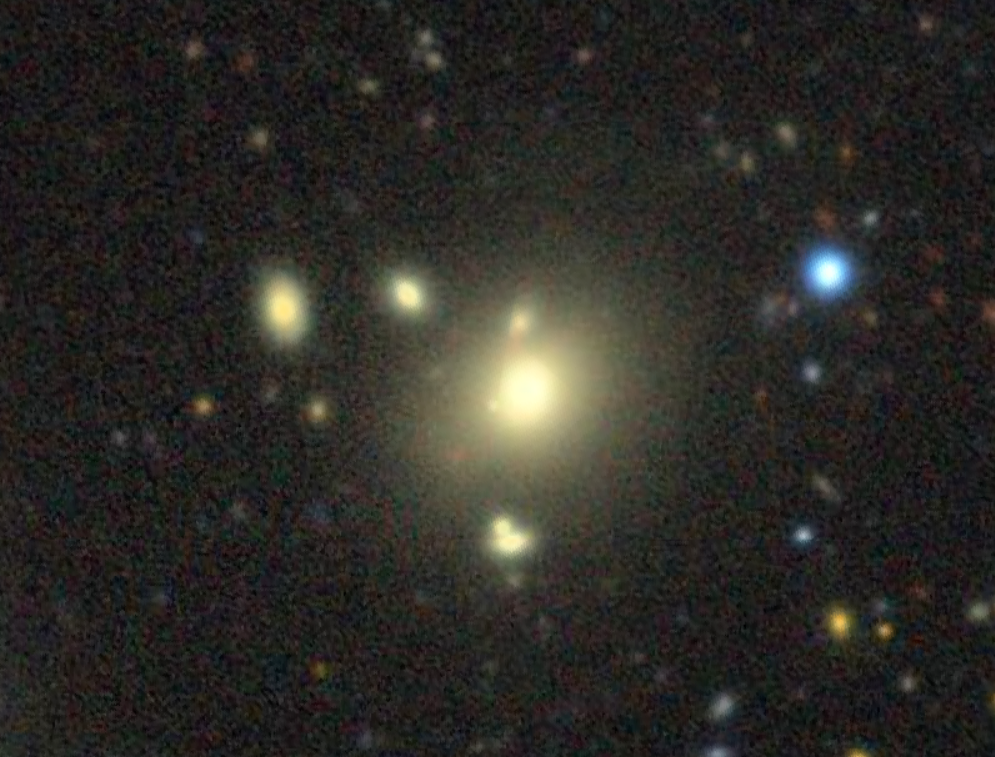
- DESI Legacy Surveys image of PKS 0043−42

Observation data (J2000.0 epoch)
- Constellation: Phoenix
- Right ascension: 00^{h} 46^{m} 17.74^{s}
- Declination: −42° 07′ 51.46″
- Redshift: 0.119776
- Heliocentric radial velocity: 35,908 km/s
- Distance: 1.589 Gly

Characteristics
- Type: Elliptical WRLG
- Size: ~232,500 ly (71.27 kpc) (estimated)

Other designations
- 2MASX J00461775−4207512, PGC 2702, PMN J0046-4207, G4Jy 0085, 2MASS J00461774−4207515, LQAC 011−042 005, MRSS 295−105194, PAPER J011.58−42.11

PKS 0043−42 is a low-excitation radio galaxy located in the constellation of Phoenix. The redshift of the object is (z) 0.119 and it was first recorded as an extragalactic radio source in December 1965 in the Parkes Catalogue survey by astronomers.

== Description ==
PKS 0043−42 is classified as a weak-line radio galaxy (WLRG), located at the center of a galaxy group. The host galaxy of the object is best described as an early-type galaxy or an elliptical galaxy based on its stellar continuum. Evidence also points to the host galaxy interacting with a companion object to the north. A diffused halo structure is surrounding the entire host galaxy.

K-band imaging showed PKS 0043−42 has evidence of isothope twisting and excessive radio emission in a north-south direction. It is suggested a dust lane might be present in the galaxy or be the result of the interaction with the companion. Surprisingly, although the galaxy displays an undisturbed appearance, a radio bridge is found connecting it to its companion.

A radio image has found the source of PKS 0043−42 is mainly extended with a Fanaroff-Riley class Type 2 morphology. While the hotspots are clearly seen even in X-ray imaging, the radio core remains undetected, even at six centimeter frequencies. Evidence of radio emission can be found bridging from the hotspots to the mid-point section of the source. In optical wavelengths, the emission lines displayed in its spectrum contain traces of low ionization. The linear polarization of the source is covered entirely over a large area. A compact dusty torus was discovered in PKS 0043−42 in 2011, indicating cold gas is fueling the accretion process rather than warm gas. The active galactic nucleus luminosity is estimated to be around 3.7 × 10^{44} erg s^{−1}.
