= PKS 1151−348 =

Quasar in the constellation of Hydra

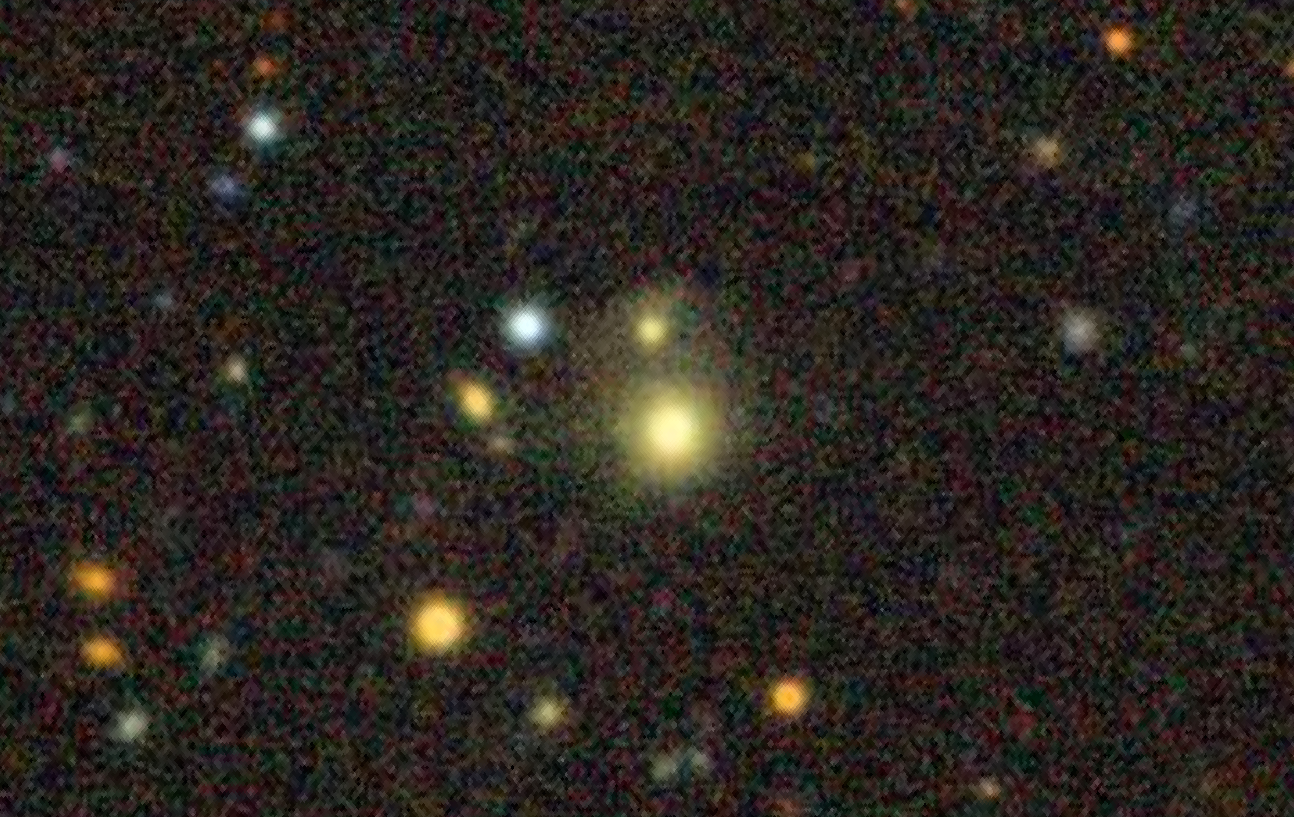
- DESI Legacy Surveys image of PKS 1151−348

Observation data (J2000.0 epoch)
- Constellation: Hydra
- Right ascension: 11^{h} 54^{m} 21.78^{s}
- Declination: −35° 05′ 29.06″
- Redshift: 0.258000
- Heliocentric radial velocity: 77,346 km/s
- Distance: 3.127 Gly
- Apparent magnitude (V): 17.84

Characteristics
- Type: Sy1
- Size: ~181,000 ly (55.6 kpc) (estimated)

Other designations
- 2MASS J11542178−3505290, 2MASX J11542180−3505293, G4Jy 0965, LEDA 2826932, OM −386, NVSS J115421−350529, MRC 1151−348, TXS 1151−348, WB J1154− 3505, PAPER J178.59−35.04

PKS 1151−348 is a quasar and a radio galaxy located in the constellation of Hydra. The redshift of the object is (z) 0.258 and it was first discovered by astronomers conducting the Parkes Catalogue survey in September 1964. It is also classified as a compact steep spectrum (CSS) quasar since the radio spectrum is mainly both compact and steep.

== Description ==
PKS 1151−348 is suggested to have a disturbed morphology based on evidence of an extended structure towards the direction of northwest. When imaged, it has either has presence of a tidal tail or an arc feature found connecting north with the secondary nucleus by 27 kiloparsecs from the host. A broad fan of radio emission is described elongating east from the nucleus with an extent of 38 kiloparsecs. This disturbed morphology indicates the host galaxy is currently interacting with a barred spiral galaxy companion in the early stages, with their nuclei yet to merge together.

The optical spectrum of the galaxy mainly displays characteristics that are similar to broad-line radio galaxies. Based on results, the Balmer series lines are classified to be rich, strong with narrow-line features that contain high ionization.

Radio imaging made by Very Long Baseline Interferometry (VLBI), found the source has two radio lobe structures that are measuring 0.2 kiloparsecs in extent with a much steeper spectrum measured for the south-western component compared to the north-western component. Both components also display 70% of the total flux density of the source. There is no evidence of a flat-spectrum component. A radio core is found, indicated to have variability with a measured modulation index of 1.9% at 843 MHz frequencies.
