= B2 0836+29 =

Radio galaxy in the constellation Cancer

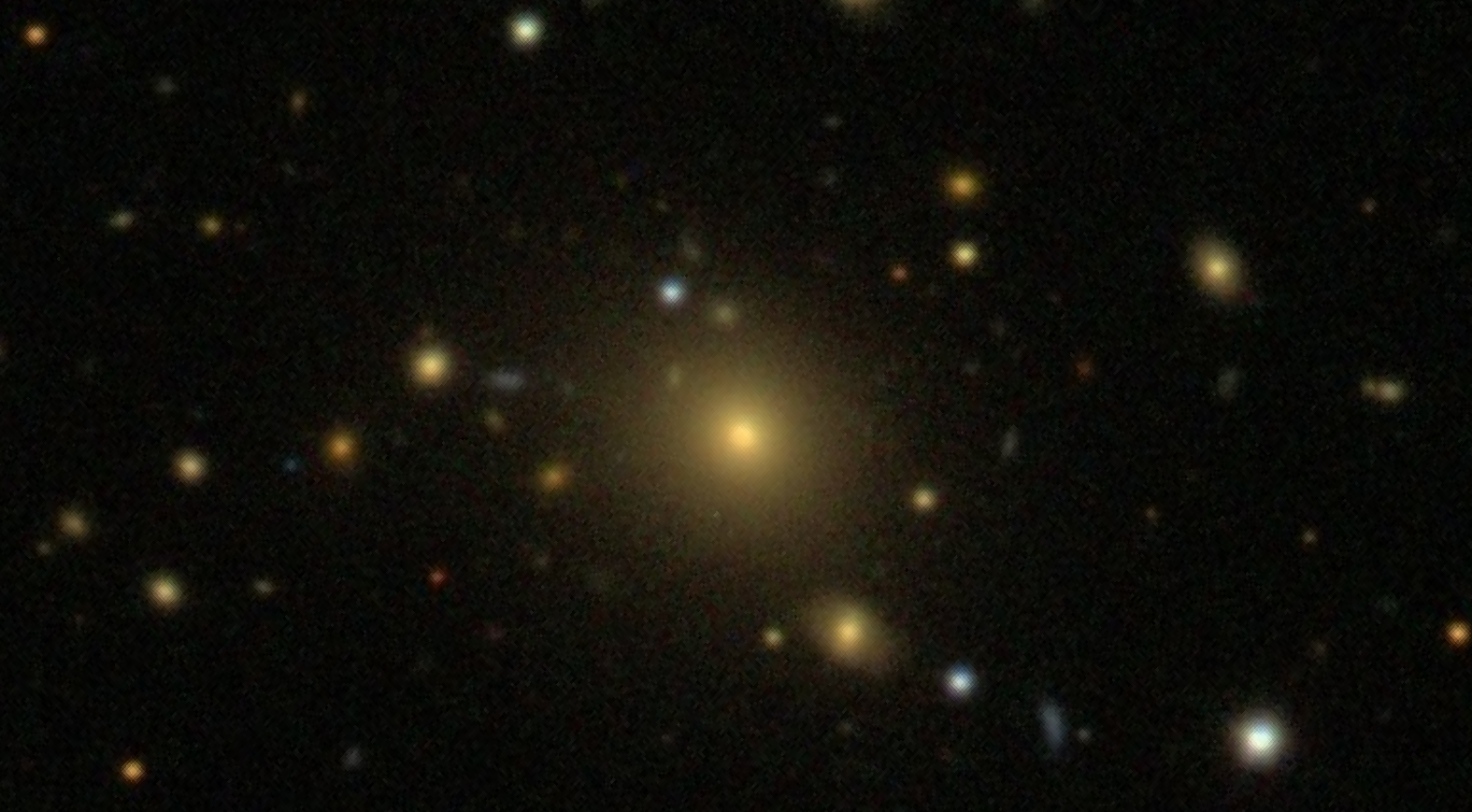
- SDSS image of the radio galaxy B2 0836+29

Observation data (J2000.0 epoch)
- Constellation: Cancer
- Right ascension: 08^{h} 39^{m} 15.82^{s}
- Declination: +28° 50′ 38.80″
- Redshift: 0.078961
- Heliocentric radial velocity: 23,672 km/s
- Distance: 1.094 Gly
- Group or cluster: Abell 690
- Apparent magnitude (V): 14.90
- Apparent magnitude (B): 16.0

Characteristics
- Type: cD; BrCIG WLRG
- Size: 199.2 kiloparsecs (649,700 light-years) (diameter; 2MASS K-band total isophote)
- Notable features: Radio galaxy

Other designations
- 2MASX J083915982+2850389, CS 0020, OJ +261, VIPS 144, PGC 24340, SDSS J083915.79+285041.9, OGC 1151, 87GB J083613.1+290133, Cul 0836+290, Abell 690:[OWB92]

B2 0836+29 is a radio galaxy located in the constellation of Cancer. The redshift of the object is (z) 0.078 and it was first discovered by astronomers in March 1973 as a blue stellar object whom they noted it as having excessive amounts of ultraviolet flux. It is classified as a Type-cD galaxy and is the brightest cluster galaxy (BCG) dominating the center of Abell 690, a rich Bautz-Morgan galaxy cluster.

== Description ==
B2 0836+29 has been categorized as a Fanaroff-Riley class Type I radio galaxy of low luminosity. It is hosted by an elliptical galaxy with an increasing radius and an excessive brightness profile which starts around the level of 22 magnitude arcsecond^{−2}. The envelope is also said to be expended on the outer parts of the galaxy, with multiple nuclei.

It has a large wide-angle tail (WAT) radio source, described as being extended with its dominant central component displaying a flat radio spectrum. A bright radio component is seen located in south direction from its nucleus. There is also a region of low brightness, based on a radio image made with Westerbork Synthesis Radio Telescope.

The galaxy shows two radio lobes, one located in the south and the other in the north when imaged by Very Long Baseline Interferometry. The southern radio lobe is found having an extended tail-like structure by 250 kiloparsecs while the northern radio lobe is also extended but only displaying little distortions. The southern lobe is also the only region where a significant percentage of radio polarization is located, reaching the values of 25%. There is a clear steeping of the lobe's spectra index from the hot spot position located east which in turn, is roughly perpendicular.

A one-sided radio jet is present in the galaxy displaying a mean surface brightness of 1 mJy arcseconds^{−2}. It is further separated into two jet components mainly a weak counterjet and a main jet. Evidence also showed the main jet has signs of amplitude oscillations averaging around 0° and is also evident of displaying a bend angle of significant degrees west, followed by a counter-bend east. Located within the jet, there are plasma particles speeding along the jet's direction right up to a distance of five kiloparsecs.

The galaxy is surrounded by an X-ray halo with a diameter of 460 kiloparsecs in extent. The X-ray emission from the halo is elongated in north-east direction which appears as aligning together with the major axis of the galaxy's stellar light. It is found the X-ray emission is also extending towards the edges of both radio lobes. Evidence also showed the X-ray emission is surprising low.
