= PKS 2014−55 =

Galaxy in Telescopium

Observation data (J2000 epoch)
- Constellation: Telescopium
- Right ascension: 20^{h} 18^{m} 01.29^{s}
- Declination: −55° 39′ 30.8″
- Redshift: 0.06063 +/- 0.00015
- Distance: 800 Mly

Characteristics
- Type: E/S0

Other designations
- WISEA J201801.29−553931.5; 2MASX J20180125−5539312; PGC 64440, 2MASS J20180128−5539315; GALEXASC J201801.26−553933.5

PKS 2014−55 is a Seyfert 2 elliptical galaxy presenting strong emission lines. It is located in the poor galaxy group, and is an X-shaped radio galaxy discovered by the MeerKAT radio telescope in South Africa that is located 800 million light-years away from Earth. The galaxy looks like two boomerangs, with jets extending 2.5 million light years across. Then the jets are “reversed” by the pressure of intergalactic gas, later deflected by gas pressure to form an “X” shape.
