= PGC 1 =

Radio galaxy in the constellation Pisces

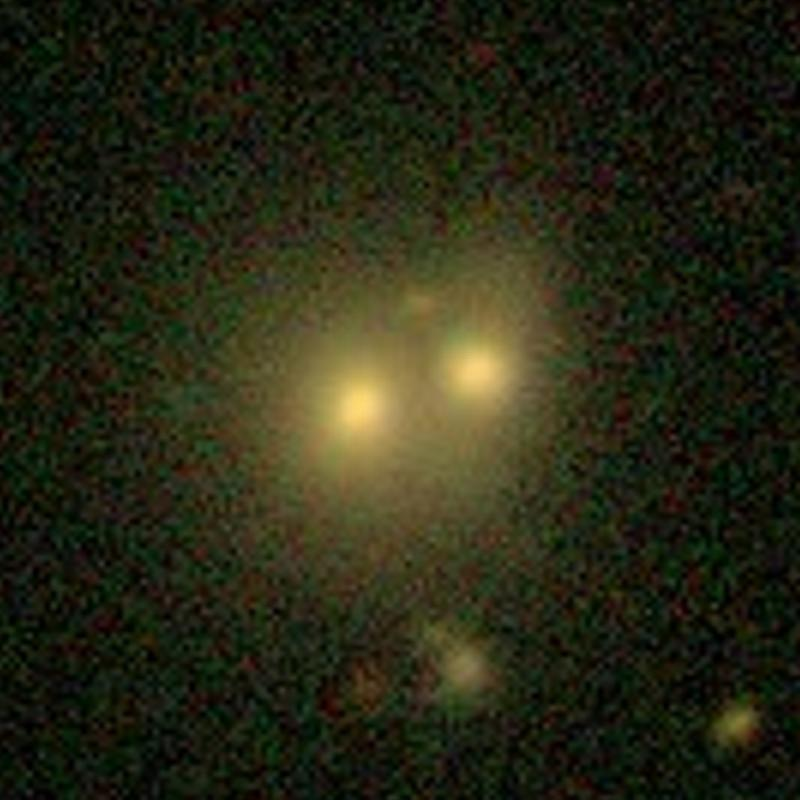
- SDSS image of PGC 1 (left-center) and SDSS J235958.29+004208.6

Observation data (J2000 epoch)
- Constellation: Pisces
- Right ascension: 23^{h} 59^{m} 58.6^{s}
- Declination: 00° 42′ 07″
- Redshift: 0.084000/25183 km/s
- Distance: 1,090 Mly (334 Mpc)
- Apparent magnitude (V): 16.10

Characteristics
- Type: ?
- Size: ~90,000 ly (estimated)
- Apparent size (V): ?

Other designations
- PKS 2357+00

PGC 1 is a radio galaxy located about 1.1 billion light-years away in the constellation Pisces.

== Physical characteristics ==
PGC 1 appears to have a companion galaxy called SDSS J235958.29+004208.6. However, the difference in the recessional velocities for the two galaxies corresponds to about 55 million light years difference in distance, so it is possible that they may not be a physical pair, but however they are essentially the same distance.

=== Radio Jet ===
PGC 1 has a radio jet coming out of its center.

== See also ==
- Principal Galaxies Catalogue
