= X-shaped radio galaxy =

Type of galaxy

X-shaped (or "winged") radio galaxies are a class of extragalactic radio source that exhibit two, low-surface-brightness radio lobes (the "wings") oriented at an angle to the active, or high-surface-brightness, lobes. Both sets of lobes pass symmetrically through the center of the elliptical galaxy that is the source of the lobes, giving the radio galaxy an X-shaped morphology as seen on radio maps (see figure).

X-shaped sources were first described by J. P. Leahy and P. Parma in 1992, who presented a list of 11 such objects. The X-shaped galaxies have received much attention following the suggestion in 2002 that they might be the sites of spin-flips associated with the recent coalescence of two supermassive black holes.

== Properties ==
X-shaped galaxies are a sub-class of Fanaroff-Riley Type II (FRII) radio galaxies. FRII objects exhibit a pair of large (kiloparsec) scale radio lobes that straddle the parent elliptical galaxy; the lobes are believed to consist of plasma ejected from the center of the galaxy by jets associated with the accretion disk around the supermassive black hole. Unlike the classical FRII sources, the X-shaped galaxies exhibit two, misaligned pairs of radio lobes of comparable extent. One pair of lobes, the "active" lobes, have a relatively high surface brightness and appear to be generated by ongoing emission from the center of the galaxy. The second set, the "wings", have a lower surface brightness, and appear to consist of plasma that was ejected along a different axis than that associated with the active lobes. The wings are also observed to have a higher spectral index than the active lobes and are highly polarized. With one exception, none of the X-shaped sources shows the broad, optical emission lines associated with quasar activity. The host galaxies mostly exhibit high ellipticities and a number have nearby companion galaxies.

== Origin ==
In their original catalog of 11 X-shaped galaxies, Leahy and Parma proposed that the "wings were created in an earlier outburst, some tens of Myrs previous to the current renewal of nuclear activity, during which time the ejection axis has precessed." They noted that their proposal was consistent with the low surface brightness, steep radio spectrum, and high polarization of the wings, all of which are features associated with old (inactive) radio sources.

A widely discussed model for the origin of the X-shaped sources invokes a spin-flip of the supermassive black hole. In this model, a galaxy merger causes a second, smaller supermassive black hole to be deposited near the center of the original radio galaxy. The smaller black hole forms a binary system with the larger black hole before the two coalesce via the emission of gravitational waves. During the coalescence, the spin axis of the larger black hole undergoes a sudden reorientation due to absorption of the smaller hole's orbital angular momentum—a "spin-flip." Since the lobes are produced by jets that are launched perpendicularly to the inner accretion disk, and since the accretion disk is constrained by the Bardeen-Petterson effect to lie perpendicular to the black hole's spin axis, a change in the spin orientation implies a change in the direction of the lobes. Even a rather small infalling black hole, with a mass approximately one-fifth that of the larger hole, could cause the spin of the latter to change by ninety degrees.

Alternative models to explain the X-shaped sources include a warping instability of the accretion disk; backflow of gas along the active lobes and binary-disk interactions before coalescence. It is likely that all of these mechanisms are active at some level and that the time scale for realignment influences the radio source morphology, with the most rapid realignments producing the X-shaped sources, while slower realignment would cause the jet to deposit its energy into a larger volume, leading to an S-shaped FRI radio source.

== See also ==
- Supermassive black hole
- Radio galaxy
- Spin-flip
