= Parkes Catalogue of Radio Sources =

The Parkes Catalogue of Radio Sources, also known as the Parkes Southern Radio Source Catalog, consists of 8264 astronomical radio sources, mostly south of declination +27. The catalogue was mostly compiled by John Bolton and his colleagues for 20 years. Both the Molonglo 408-MHz survey and the 80-MHz Culgoora measurements of Slee et al have contributed to the usefulness of the catalogue. For now, the catalogue only contains sources originally found in the Parkes 2700-MHz survey. The catalogue contains radio sources that have a frequency range of 80 - 22,000 MHz.

== Objects ==
- PKS 0521-365
- PKS 0637-752
- PKS 1209-51/52
- PKS 1402-012
- PKS 1302-102
- PKS 0548-322
- PKS 1727-21 (Kepler’s Supernova)
- PKS 2000-330
- PKS 2014-55
- PKS 2155-304
- PKS 2201+044
- PKS-2349-014
- PKS 2357+00 (PGC 1)

== See also ==
- Astronomical catalogues
- List of astronomical catalogues
