= Spectral index =

Measure in astronomy

In astronomy, the spectral index of a source is a measure of the dependence of radiative flux density (that is, radiative flux per unit of frequency) on frequency. Given frequency, $\nu$, in Hz and radiative flux density, $S_\nu$ in Jy, the spectral index $\alpha$ is given implicitly by
$$S_\nu\propto\nu^\alpha.$$
If flux does not follow a power law in frequency, the spectral index itself is a function of frequency. Rearranging the above, we see that the spectral index is given by
$$\alpha \! \left( \nu \right) = \frac{\partial \log S_\nu \! \left( \nu \right)}{\partial \log \nu}.$$

Clearly the power law can only apply over a certain range of frequency because otherwise the integral over all frequencies would be infinite.

Spectral index is also sometimes defined in terms of wavelength $\lambda$. In this case, the spectral index $\alpha$ is given implicitly by
$$S_\lambda\propto\lambda^\alpha,$$
and at a given frequency, spectral index may be calculated by taking the derivative
$$\alpha \! \left( \lambda \right) =\frac{\partial \log S_\lambda \! \left( \lambda \right)}{\partial \log \lambda}.$$
The spectral index using the $S_\nu$, which we may call $\alpha_\nu,$ differs from the index $\alpha_\lambda$ defined using $S_\lambda.$ The total flux between two frequencies or wavelengths is
$$S = C_1\left(\nu_2^{\alpha_\nu+1}-\nu_1^{\alpha_\nu+1}\right) = C_2\left(\lambda_2^{\alpha_\lambda+1} - \lambda_1^{\alpha_\lambda+1}\right) = c^{\alpha_\lambda+1} C_2\left(\nu_2^{-\alpha_\lambda-1}-\nu_1^{-\alpha_\lambda-1}\right)$$
which implies that
$$\alpha_\lambda=-\alpha_\nu-2.$$
The opposite sign convention is sometimes employed, in which the spectral index is given by
$$S_\nu\propto\nu^{-\alpha}.$$

== Spectral index of thermal and non-thermal emission ==
At radio frequencies (i.e., in the low-frequency, long-wavelength limit), where the Rayleigh–Jeans law is a good approximation to the spectrum of thermal radiation, intensity is given by
$$B_\nu(T) \simeq \frac{2 \nu^2 k T}{c^2}.$$
Taking the logarithm of each side and taking the partial derivative with respect to $\log \, \nu$ yields
$$\frac{\partial \log B_\nu(T)}{\partial \log \nu} \simeq 2.$$
Using the positive sign convention, the spectral index of thermal radiation is thus $\alpha \simeq 2$ in the Rayleigh–Jeans regime. The spectral index departs from this value at higher frequencies, for which the Rayleigh–Jeans law becomes an increasingly inaccurate approximation. At the frequency where the intensity peaks, the spectral index is zero, and the index goes negative on the blue side of the peak. For a blackbody spectral energy distribution, Wien's displacement law gives the frequency of the peak. Because of the simple temperature dependence of radiative flux in the Rayleigh–Jeans regime, the radio spectral index is defined implicitly by
$$S \propto \nu^{\alpha} T.$$

The principal non-thermal emission process, synchrotron radiation, has a spectral index (with the positive sign convention) of 2.5 in the optically thick regime. This occurs at low frequencies. At frequencies high enough for the emission to be optically thin, the spectral index depends on the energy distribution of the high-energy particles responsible for the emission. For typical astronomical synchrotron sources, the spectral index is near −0.7 and rarely above −0.5 or below −1.2.

The spectral index of a source, especially a radio source, can indicate its properties. For example, the spectral index of the emission from an optically thin thermal plasma is −0.1, whereas for an optically thick thermal plasma it is 2. Therefore, a spectral index of −0.1 to 2 at radio frequencies often indicates thermal emission, while a significantly negative spectral index typically indicates synchrotron emission. The observed emission can be affected by several absorption processes, most of which affect the low-frequency emission the most. In other words, the observed emission does not necessarily match the intrinsic emission. Absorption at low frequencies might result in a positive spectral index even if the intrinsic emission has a negative index, and therefore positive spectral index does not guarantee that the emission is thermal.

== See also ==
- Color index
