= Extended emission-line region =

Interstellar clouds

An extended emission-line region (EELR) is a giant interstellar cloud ionized by the radiation of an active galactic nucleus (AGN) inside a galaxy or photons produced by the shocks associated with the radio jets. An EELR can appear as a resolved cloud in relative nearby galaxies and as narrow emission lines in more distant galaxies.

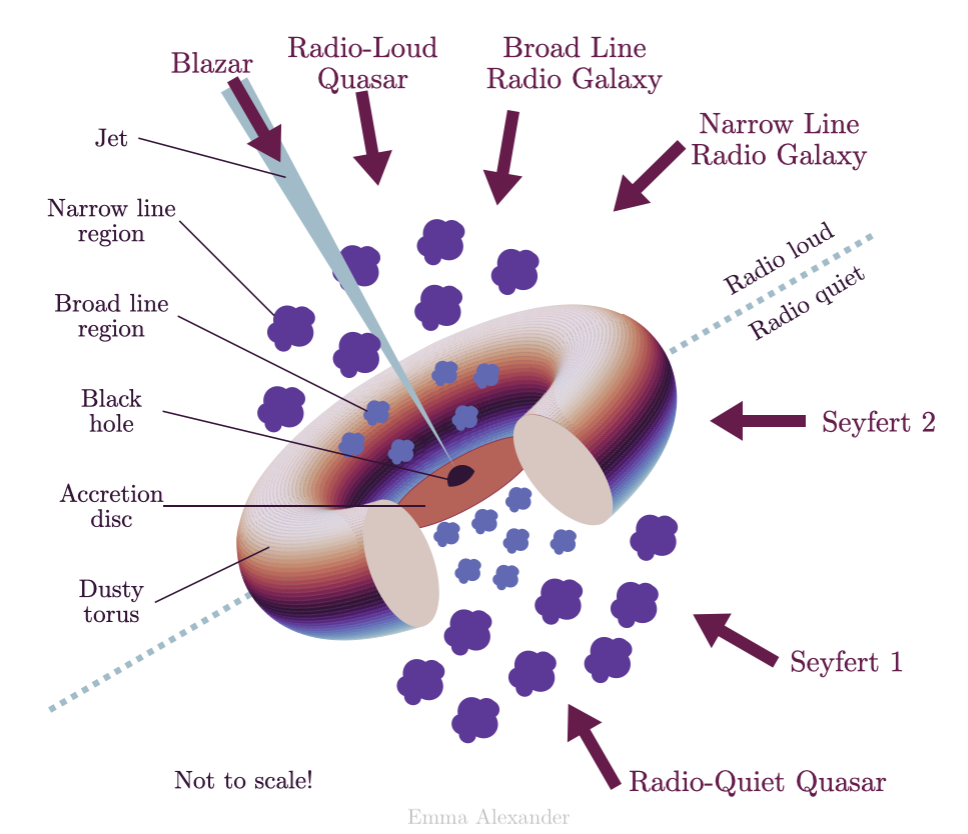
In this unified model of AGNs the EELRs should be thought as an extended version of the blue clouds labelled as "narrow line region".

EELRs were first discovered in radio galaxies. Usually the clouds emitting the narrow emission lines are restricted to a few kiloparsecs within the AGN, but some galaxies have narrow emission lines that extend a few kiloparsec to over 100 kiloparsecs. These clouds where therefore called extended emission-line regions (EELRs) and usually have a large doubly ionized oxygen [O III]/Hβ ratio, as well as a strong ionized helium He II/Hβ ratio (oxygen line at 5007 Å, helium line at 4686 Å). In some cases these EELRs show highly ionized species, such as calcium [Ca V] and iron [Fe VII] [Fe X]. Another common highly ionized species is the emission of neon [Ne V] (main line at 3426 Å). This high level of ionization shows that the EELRs must be ionized by a mechanism related to the nucleus of the galaxy. HII regions do not show this high level of ionization. The first [O III] images of EELRs were around galaxies, such as 3C 79, 4C 37.43, NGC 3516 or NGC 4151.

In 2009 a large cloud was discovered that had similar spectral features as EELRs, but had no ionizing AGN nearby. It was concluded that the nearby galaxy IC 2497 hosted an AGN in the past. Today this AGN faded into inactivity. The hard ionizing radiation did however need time to travel the thousands of lightyears towards a cloud, which would later become Hanny's Voorwerp. This makes Hanny's Voorwerp the first EELR associated with a fading AGN. Previously EELRs were commonly first discovered via spectroscopy and required high-resolution imaging to further resolve the EELRs. Hanny's Voorwerp was however discovered in broad band imaging from the Sloan Digital Sky Survey. This prompted a search for more EELRs in broad-band imaging surveys by galaxy zoo volunteers, who also discovered Hanny's Voorwerp. EELRs are called "Voorwerpjes" by the galaxy zoo members. EELRs that are ionized by the AGN of a companion galaxy were also discovered. This type of ionization is called cross-ionization.

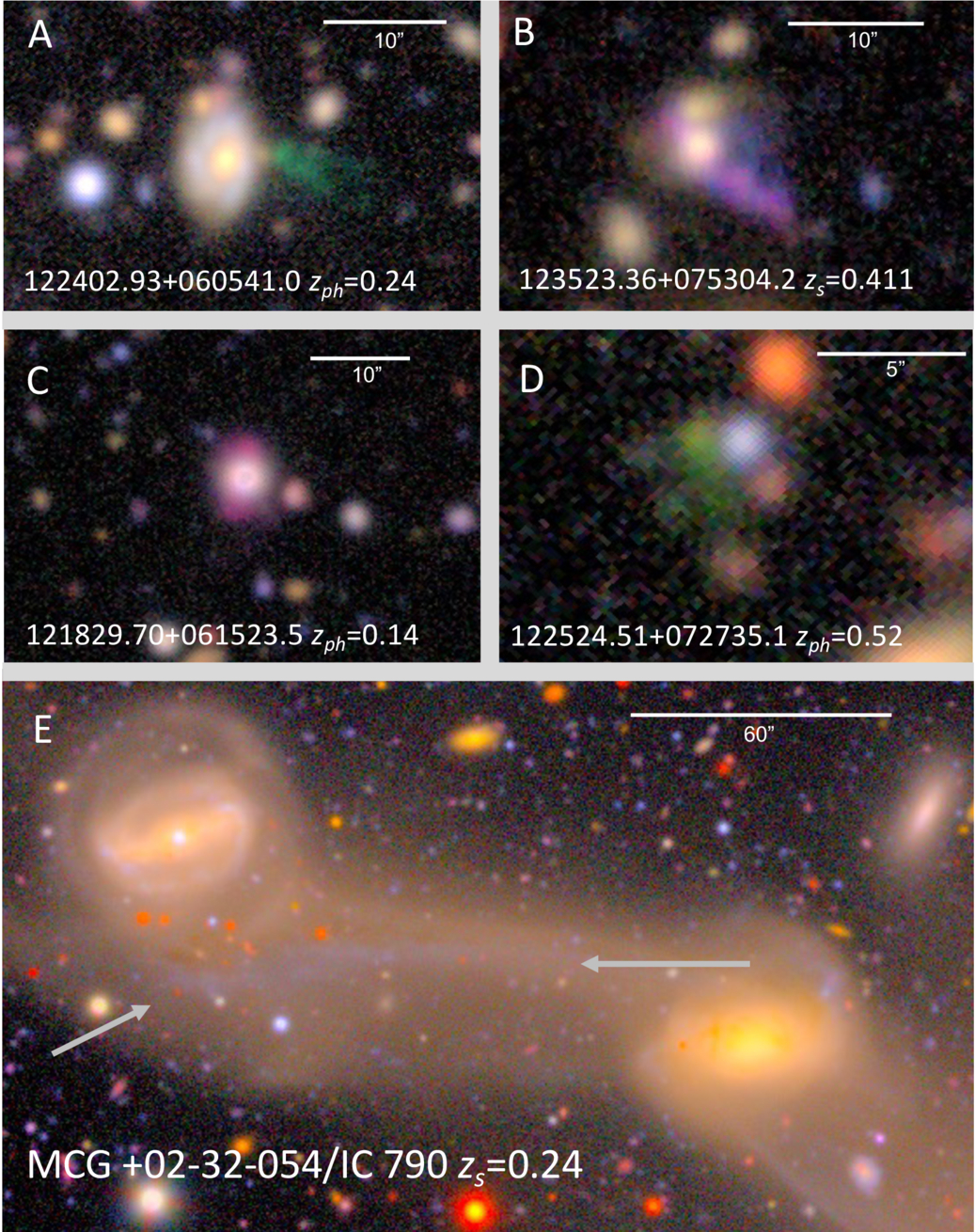
A composite showing five candidate EELR taken from the Rubin Virgo Field 'first look' release in June 2025.

In broad-band images the [O III] emission lines usually lie at the g-band. The true color of an EELR would be dominated by the [O III] emission, which is a cyan color. In astronomical imaging slightly false-color images that transform g, r and i bands into RGB-images are more common. Sometimes the i-band is replaced with a z-band image. The EELRs appear as blue (g-band) objects in these survey images. Sometimes the H-alpha line is redshifted enough to lie at the i-band, which can make the EELR appear as a blue-violet object in these survey images. Sometimes the [O III] is redshifted enough that this line overlaps with the r-band or i-band, which makes them green or red in survey images of the Hyper Suprime-Cam. At around 0.1 < z < 0.38 the 5006.843 Å [O III] line is redshifted to the r-band and at 0.38 < z < 0.68 it is redshifted to the i-band. (Note: Calculated with the formula z=(λ_{observe}-λ_{emit})/λ_{emit} and the transition of SDSS filters from Figure 2 in Smith et al. 2002) A team of researchers detected a resolved EELR at a high redshift of 4.54 in a galaxy protocluster with JWST.

Another related type of cloud is an extended narrow-line region (ENLR). The EELRs usually have dynamically chaotic structures and high velocities and are probably the result of mergers. ENLRs on the other hand follow the disk structure of the galaxy and have a low velocity.

Recently a connection between EELRs and Tidal Disruption Events (TDE), as well as quasi-periodic X-ray eruption (QPE) was found. This connection is explained with TDEs and QPEs favouring a gas-rich post-merger environment. It is possible that repeated TDEs could power EELRs. On the other hand, a fading AGN could result in an increase of the rate of TDEs.

== List of resolved EELRs ==
This is a list of EELRs with resolved [O III] images or other emission-lines

Name Host galaxy	Image EELR	Distance to nucleus (kpc)	Date/Reference
MR 2251-178		30-50	1990
Centaurus A outer and inner filaments		7 & 16	1991
IC 5063		22	1991
3CR 368		45	1991
3C 352		15.6	1992
NGC 4151		1.16	1993
NGC 3516		4	1995
3C 273		14.4	1996
PKS 2250–41		40-65	1997
NGC 5643		1.8	1997
PKS 2356−61		25	1998
NGC 5256		7	2000
NGC 4388		35	2002
4C 37.43		20	2002
3C 171		5	2003
PKS 1932−46		100	2007
3C 79			2008
IC 2497		40	2009
3C 48			2009
Mrk 1014			2009
3C 249.1			2009
Ton 616			2009
Ton 202			2009
PKS 2251+11			2009
Mrk 78		16	2012
SDSS J095559.88+395446.9		10	2012
SDSS J100507.88+283038.5		13	2012
IC 2637		11	2012
NGC 3758		17	2012
UGC 7342		38	2012
NGC 5252		21	2012
Mrk 273		19	2012
Mrk 463		16	2012
Teacup galaxy		18	2012
SDSS J151004.01+074037.1		10	2012
CGCG 077-117 (SDSS J152412.58+083241.2)		19	2012
NGC 5972		33	2012
Mrk 1498		21	2012
Mrk 883		37	2012
UGC 11185		11	2012
SDSS J220141.64+115124.3		16	2012
3C 305			2012
3C 381		38	2013
NGC 7252		4	2013
PGC 043234 (ASASSN-14li)		10	2016
ShaSS 073		21	2018
J023106−034513		30	2018
J083823+015012		29	2018
J090254+001116		10	2018
J091113+032604		10	2018
J092203−004443		13	2018
J155143+434758		11	2018
J162913+441442		15	2018
J220347+020443		12	2018
J220440+005232		8	2018
J224027+004347		9	2018
3C 17		14.9	2019
3C 18		24.8	2019
3C 33		11.2	2019
3C 63		38.0	2019
3C 318.1 (NGC 5920)		11.7	2019
3C 327		19.5	2019
3C 353		17.2	2019
3C 386		11.1	2019
3C 403		8.3	2019
3C 424		32.9	2019
3C 442 (NGC 7236)		3.8	2019
3C 445		18.5	2019
3C 458		111.3	2019
3C 459		76.0	2019
SDSS J002944.89+001011.1			2019
SDSS J005754.03+012013.8			2019
SDSS J083902.96+470756.3			2019
Z 180–9			2019
NGC 3341			2019
UGC 6081			2019
SDSS J120149.74-015327.5			2019
SDSS J121418.25+293146.7			2019
Arp 239 (NGC 5278/NGC 5279)			2019
SDSS J135429.05+132757.2			2019
Mrk 1172		14	2021
NGC 235		26	2022
NGC 5514		75	2022
3C 98		6	2022
3C 135		31.6	2022
3C 180		59.8	2022
3C 196.1		9.3	2022
3C 198		32.6	2022
3C 227		46.1	2022
3C 300		17.2	2022
2MASS J08001609+2928172			2023
Z 119–12			2023
2MASX J13020015+2746579			2023
2MASS J08152577+3720258			2023
2MASX J09515536+0329006			2023
UGC 5941			2024
Markarian 950 (iPTF16fnl)		6.5	2024
J1000+0234		>8.6	2024
GSN 069		9.2	2024
RXJ1301		2.8	2024
eRO-QPE2		4.6	2024
SDSS J110840.11+340552.2 (ASASSN-14ae)		2.4	2025
ESO 253-3 (ASASSN-14ko)		22.9	2025
LEDA 307968 (AT 2019ahk)		6.2	2025
