= SDSS J2358−0009 =

Type 2 quasar in the constellation Pisces

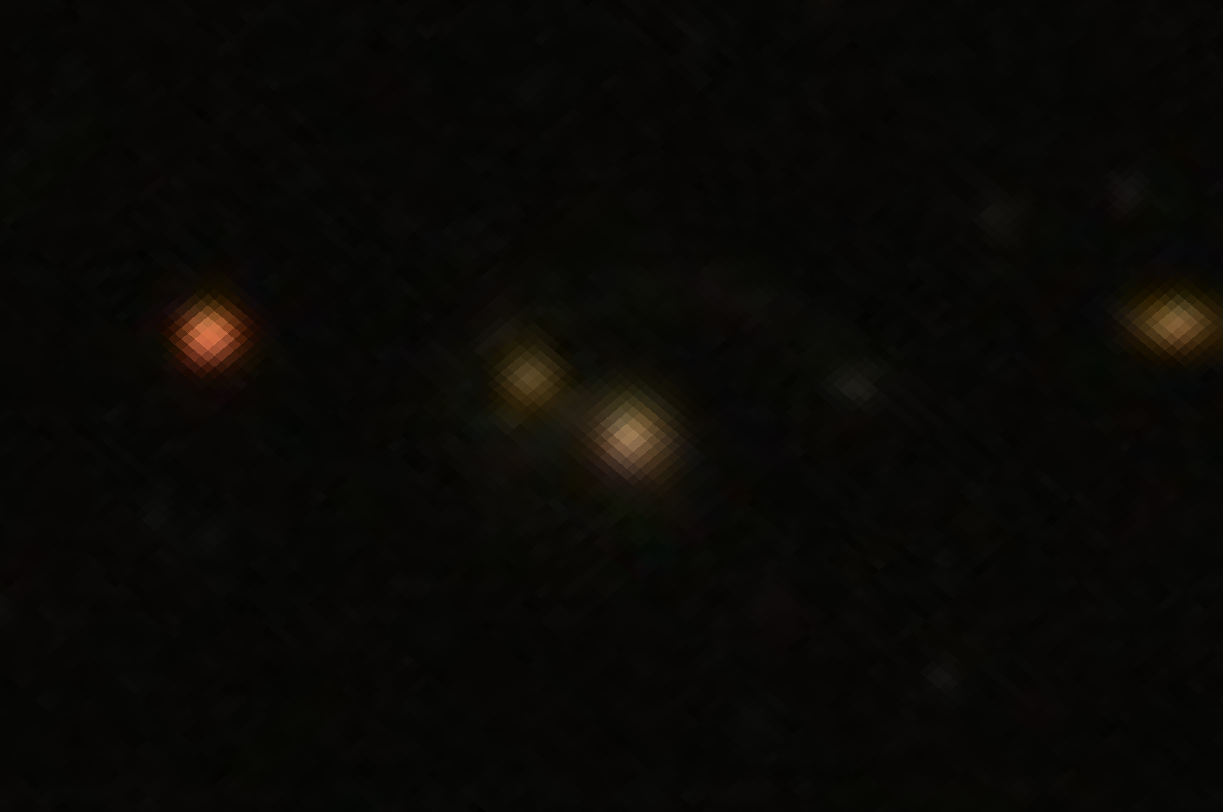
- The Type 2 quasar SDSS J2358−0009

Observation data (J2000.0 epoch)
- Constellation: Pisces
- Right ascension: 23^{h} 58^{m} 18.91^{s}
- Declination: −00° 09′ 19.10″
- Redshift: 0.402520
- Heliocentric radial velocity: 120,672 ± 5 km/s
- Distance: 5,810.2 ± 406.7 Mly (1,781.43 ± 124.70 Mpc)
- Apparent magnitude (B): 20.88

Characteristics
- Type: Type 2 quasar

Other designations
- SDSS J235818.87−000919.5, QSO J2358−0009, [VV2006c] J235818.9−000919, LEDA 3420293

SDSS J2358−0009 also known as SDSS J2358−00, is a Type 2 quasar located in the constellation of Pisces. The redshift of the object is (z) 0.402 and it was first discovered by astronomers in November 2006 from the Sloan Digital Sky Survey (SDSS).

== Description ==
SDSS J2358−0009 is a Type 2 quasar with an estimated doubly ionized oxygen [O III] emission line luminosity of 9.96 L_{ʘ} based on observations made by the Chandra X-ray Observatory. The host galaxy of the quasar imaged by the Hubble Space Telescope (HST) is interacting with a companion star-forming galaxy located at a projected distance of 29 kiloparsecs, with the presence of tidal tails and shell-like structures east of the host's nucleus. The tidal tail of the companion is linking with another companion at an unknown redshift. There is an elongated knot feature located 30 kiloparsecs east from the host, with a knotty internal substructure and mainly being dominated by continuum radio emission. A tidal bridge with a surface brightness of 22.7 magnitude is linking between the host and the companion.

A study found the quasar is compton-thick based on its [O III] luminosity ratio. An extended emission-line region (EELR) is present with the extended ionized nebula being photoionized by the quasar. The nebula has a maximum size of 64 kiloparsecs, while the EELR luminosity is 5.1 ± 0.1 × 10^{41} erg s^{−1}. There are also detections of ionized outflows from the quasar with the [O III] lines displaying a full width at half maximum of 440 ± 50. The [O III] lines have no profile asymmetries, with the lines having an [O III] flux of 75 ± 6 × 10^{16} erg^{−1} s^{−2}. The velocity shift relative to the [O III] narrow core component is 10 ± 40 kilometers per second. Young stellar populations have also been detected inside the quasar, contributing between 88% and 95% of the flux, with the population age estimated to be 0.04-0.05 billion years.
