= NGC 7212 =

Galaxy in the constellation Pegasus

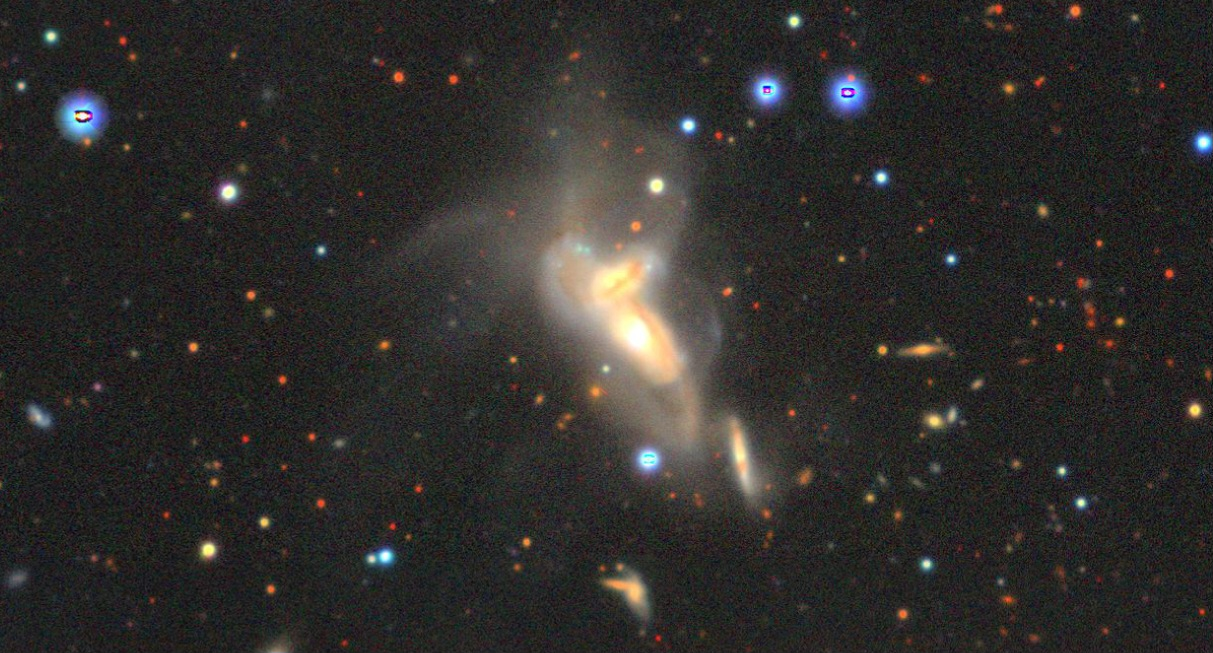
- NGC 7212 image by DESI Legacy Surveys

Observation data (J2000 epoch)
- Constellation: Pegasus
- Right ascension: 22^{h} 07^{m} 02.0808^{s}
- Declination: +10° 14′ 03.154″
- Redshift: 0.026632
- Heliocentric radial velocity: 7,984 km/s ± 21
- Distance: 369 Mly
- Apparent magnitude (V): 14.1

Characteristics
- Type: Sab; Sy2
- Size: ~112,200 ly (34.40 kpc) (estimated)

Other designations
- CGCG 428-032, CGCG 2204.6+1000, MCG +02-56-011, IRAS 22045+0959, PGC 68065 UGC 11910

NGC 7212 is a spiral galaxy located in the constellation Pegasus. It is about 369 million light-years from Earth. It was discovered on October 2, 1886, by the astronomer Lewis A. Swift. It is also classified as a Seyfert galaxy and such contains an extended emission-line region (EELR).

== Description ==
NGC 7212 is classified to be part of an interacting system of three galaxies, of which two are of them are found to be merging together. The nucleus is found active and it has been categorized as a Seyfert galaxy of Type 2 based on the discovery of weak hydrogen beta emission lines. A study published in February 1995, has found it has a presence of a jet-like feature being shown as both ionized and extended from the nucleus region by around 10 arcseconds, with an orientation of 170°.

In 2020, X-ray emission was found in NGC 7212 by Chandra X-ray Observatory. When observed, the emission is described as extended on kiloparsec scales and diffused, with 20% of it being located outside of the central radius. Imaging with Hubble Space Telescope (HST), also found there are also detections of doubly ionized oxygen emission mainly made up of several blob components located both north and south from the nucleus.

== Galaxy Triplet ==
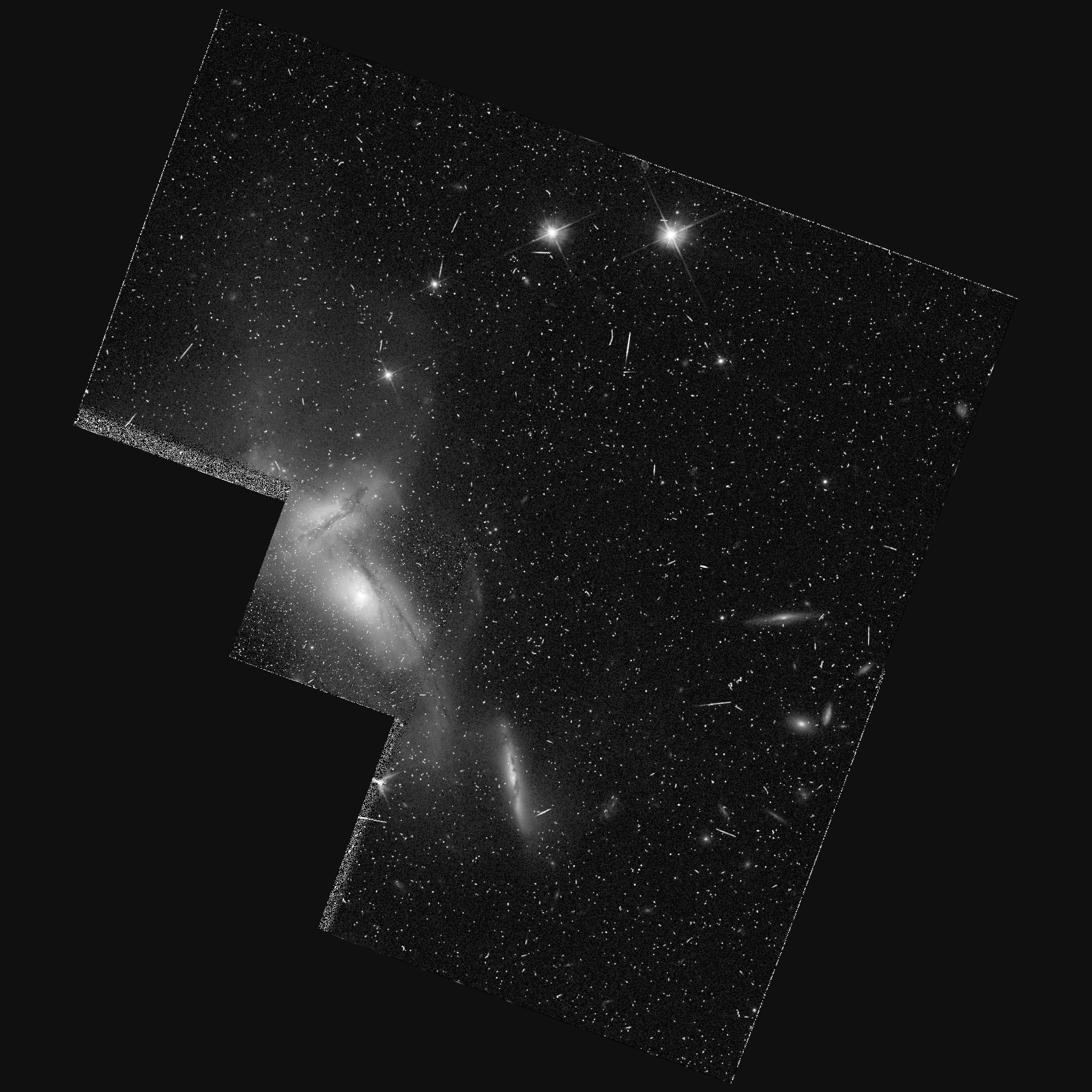
NGC 7212 imaged by Hubble Space Telescope

NGC 7212 is part of a triplet of galaxies, at the center of which it lies. The galaxy to the northeast is PGC 6728403. The second, located to the southwest, is 2MASS J22070015+1013286. The first two galaxies show clear signs of gravitational interaction. As for the third, further south, its distance from Hubble remains unknown, and it may well be a background galaxy

== Supermassive black hole ==
A study conducted in 2007 with 90 Seyfert 2-type galaxies using velocity dispersion allowed scientists to estimate the mass of their central supermassive black holes. For NGC 7212, the mass of the black hole is equal to 30 × 10^{6} M_{☉}.

According to an article published in 2012, Several studies of velocity dispersion in the central region have allowed its mass to be estimated at 3.2 × 10^{7} M_{☉}.
