= B2 1441+26 =

Radio galaxy in the constellation Boötes

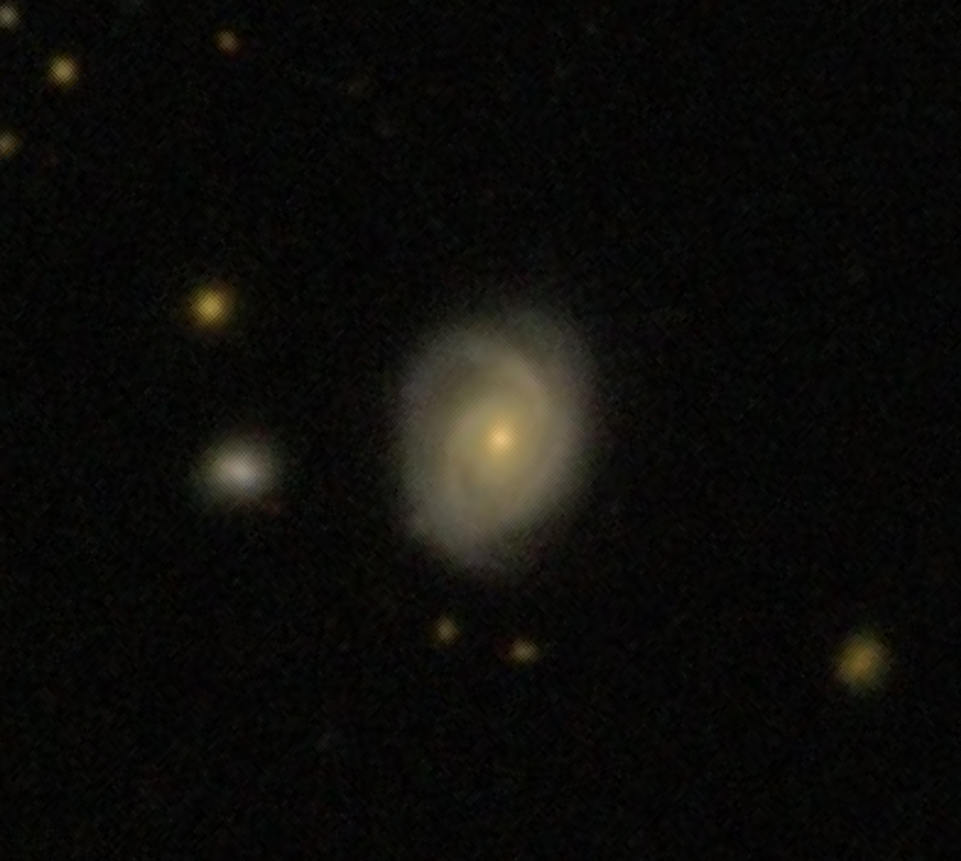
- SDSS image of B2 1441+26

Observation data (J2000 epoch)
- Constellation: Boötes
- Right ascension: 14^{h} 44^{m} 06.29^{s}
- Declination: +26° 01′ 11.68″
- Redshift: 0.061961
- Heliocentric radial velocity: 18575 ± 2 km/s
- Distance: 919.4 ± 64.4 Mly (281.89 ± 19.73 Mpc)
- Magnitude (J): 12.92
- Magnitude (H): 12.13

Characteristics
- Size: ~195,000 ly (59.9 kpc) (estimated)

Other designations
- 2MASX J14440631+2601118, 7C 1441+2614, CGCG 134-024, PGC 52616, 1441+26

B2 1441+26 is a radio galaxy located in the constellation Boötes. The redshift of the galaxy is (z) 0.061. It was first discovered by astronomers in October 1983 from the B2 catalogue, and contains a double radio source.

== Description ==
B2 1441+26 is categorized as a Fanaroff-Riley Class Type 1 low luminosity radio galaxy. It is hosted by a nearly face-on spiral galaxy, although some studies suggest the host may be an elliptical galaxy instead. Studies also classify it as a weak radio galaxy (WRG) with an ordinary galactic disk visible in optical images. It also has an inner structure or a spiral-patterned bar feature. Two companions have been found east and northeast of the galaxy's nucleus. The galaxy's extended emission-line region is unresolved.

The galaxy contains a double radio source, being resolved into two separate components. The radio sources have a steep radio spectrum. It has two asymmetric radio lobes, and the lobe on the eastern side has twice the luminousity and three times the polarization of the lobe on the western side. The lobes also have a different magnetic field direction, being orientated parallel towards the axis of the source but also in an almost perpendicular direction. Towards the inner region of the lobes, there is a steepening of the radio spectrum, although the low brightness meant the tracing of steepening along the lobes' length could only be conducted halfway. A radio core is embedded inside the eastern lobe.
