= B2 1116+28 =

Radio galaxy in the constellation Leo

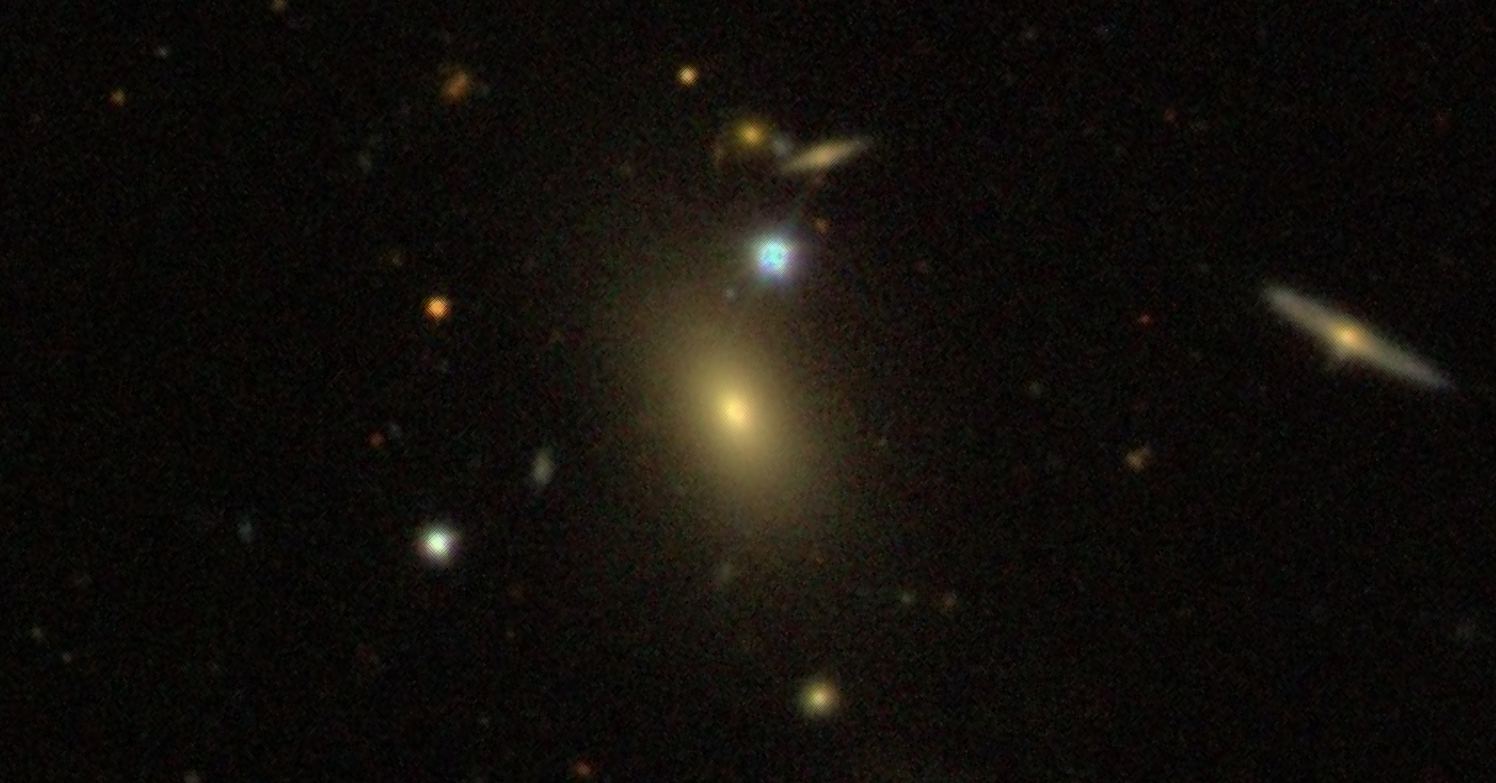
- SDSS image of B2 1116+28. The edge-on spiral galaxy on the right is LEDA 93620.

Observation data (J2000 epoch)
- Constellation: Leo
- Right ascension: 11^{h} 18^{m} 59.36^{s}
- Declination: +27° 54′ 07.15″
- Redshift: 0.067180
- Heliocentric radial velocity: 20140 ± 40 km/s
- Distance: 967.3 ± 67.8 Mly (296.59 ± 20.78 Mpc)
- magnitude (J): 11.96

Characteristics
- Type: Flat Spectrum Radio Source
- Size: ~347,000 ly (106.4 kpc) (estimated)

Other designations
- 2MASX J11185938+2754070, 7C 1116+2810, CGCG 156-060, PGC 34617, MCG +05-27-054, NVSS J111859+275409, TXS 1116+281

B2 1116+28 is a radio galaxy located in the constellation of Leo. The redshift of the galaxy is (z) 0.067 and it was first discovered by astronomers from a sample of at least 138 galaxies from both the Bologna Sky Survey and Third Cambridge Catalogue of Radio Sources in October 1984. It is classified as a low luminosity radio galaxy.

== Description ==
B2 1116+28 has been categorized as a weak emission-line radio galaxy (WLRG). Its host is described as an ordinary isolated elliptical galaxy with a boxy morphology and has an undisturbed appearance. When observed with the Westerbork Synthesis Radio Telescope, it contains a wide angle tail radio source. The radio core is found resolved with traces of radio emission depicted with low surface brightness and orientated at position angle of 100°. The total luminosity of the core is estimated around 7.16 × 10^{39} erg s^{−1}. There are presence of two outer radio lobes with a measured spectra indexes of 1.4 ± 0.2.

Further radio observations also detected a presence of a central component with the polarization angle being 88° and a rotation measure of around 7 radii square meter. The radio spectrum of the source is mainly straight between the frequencies ranging from 408 MHz and 10.55 GHz frequencies. There are presence of two radio jets based on arcsecond imaging resolutions, with evidence of a two-sided structure positioned in the same direction like the jets. Evidence also found the main jet is located on the western direction. A study also found detections of polarization, with the eastern lobe being polarized at 15% while the central region is polarized at 8%. Meanwhile, the polarization is the highest in the western lobe, exceeding more than 20%.

An extended emission line region has been detected in B2 1116+28. Based on observations, the region is described to have a circular appearance and is mainly associated with a radio source depicted having evidence of an extended structure in the position angle of 80°.
