= 4C +30.31 =

Radio galaxy in the constellation Hercules

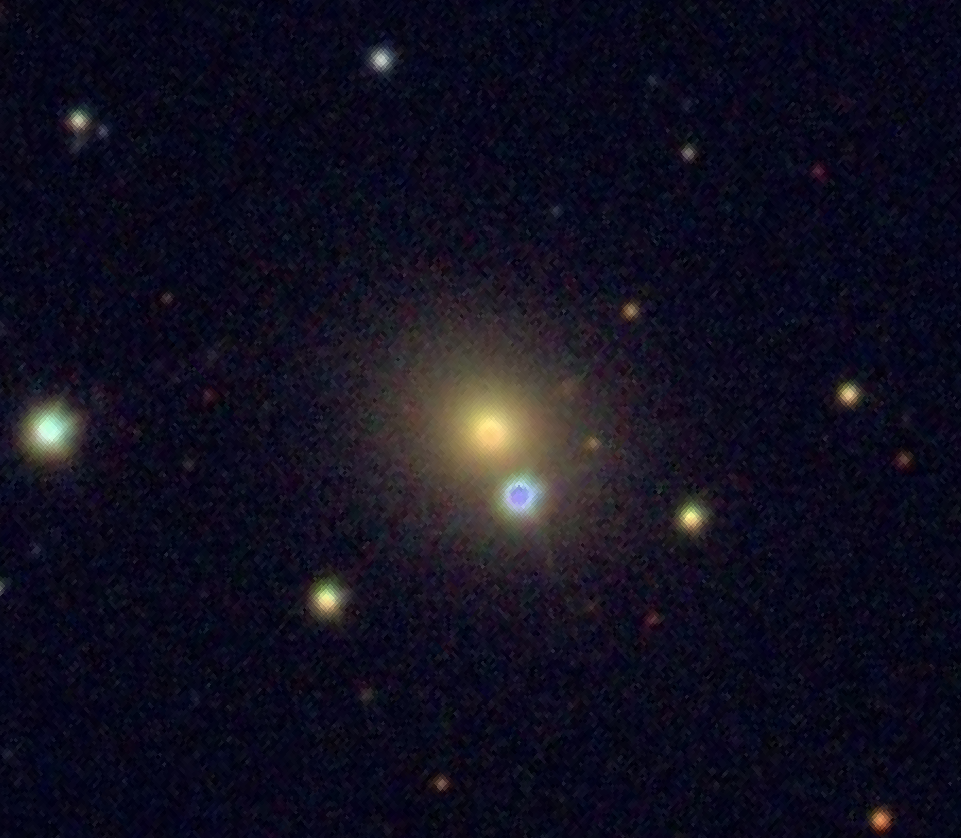
- SDSS image of 4C +30.31

Observation data (J2000 epoch)
- Constellation: Hercules
- Right ascension: 17^{h} 00^{m} 45.23^{s}
- Declination: +30° 08′ 12.99″
- Redshift: 0.034424
- Heliocentric radial velocity: 10320 ± 250 km/s
- Distance: 519.8 ± 40.2 Mly (159.37 ± 12.32 Mpc)
- magnitude (H): 11.59

Characteristics
- Type: WLRG LINER
- Size: ~237,000 ly (72.6 kpc) (estimated)

Other designations
- B2 1658+30, PGC 59420, 2MASX J17004523+3008129, NSA 147601, TXS 1658+302

4C +30.31 known as B2 1658+30, is a radio galaxy located in the constellation of Hercules. The redshift of the object is (z) 0.034, and it was first discovered from a sample of 490 astronomical radio sources by E.T. Olsen in August 1967. In October 1972, this would be identified with an elliptical galaxy counterpart.

== Description ==
4C +30.31 is categorized as an elliptical galaxy with a smooth appearance based on imaging made by Hubble Space Telescope (HST). It is also a weak radio galaxy based on optical imaging with a companion present suggesting it is located in a rich galaxy environment. The extended emission-line region of the galaxy has been described to have a complex appearance with its central source being associated with a bright region. The region is also estimated to have an extend of 6.9 kiloparsecs and has an orientation of 143°. The central core region has an unresolved appearance.

The galaxy has also been classified as a Fanaroff-Riley Class Type 1 radio galaxy. When observed, there is a radio jet seen on one side and embedded inside a region of diffused radio emission. Radio imaging made at 1.4 GHz frequencies also suggested the source is a double. The radio spectrum is also classified initially flat in the nucleus, but however it is found steepening on the outer regions. On kiloparsec scales, the morphology of the source is the same, with two resolved radio lobes that are extended. There is a main jet clearly shown and pointing in the direction of southwest. As for the counter jet on the other hand, it is embedded within the lobe's low surface brightness region. A low-ionization nuclear emission-line region (LINER) is suggested to be present in the galaxy. A study also found the edges of the lobes contain signs of strong polarization levels reaching between 40% and 50%.
