= Markarian 463 =

Galaxy in the constellation of Boötes

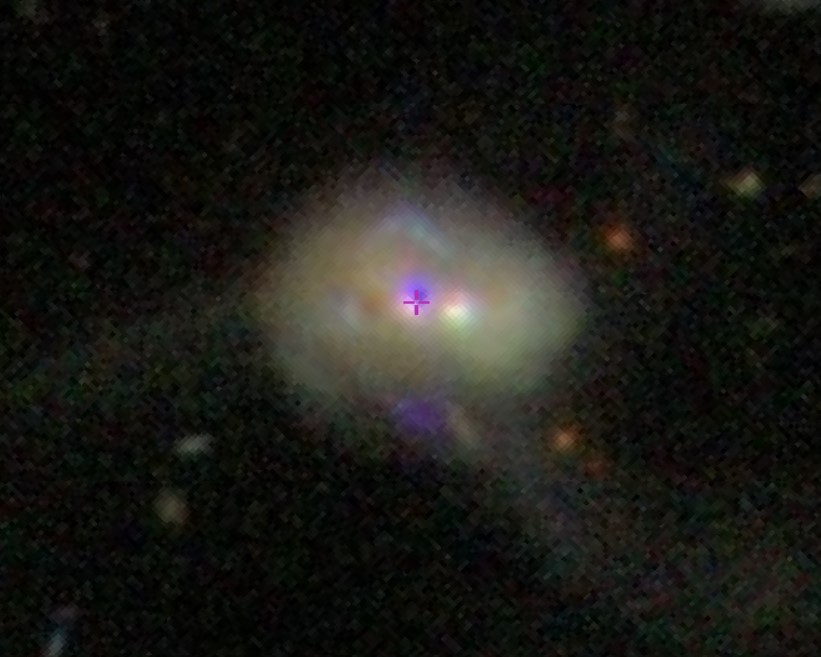
- Mrk 463 by SDSS

Observation data (J2000 epoch)
- Constellation: Boötes
- Right ascension: 13^{h} 56^{m} 02.87^{s}
- Declination: +18° 22′ 19.48″
- Redshift: 0.050802
- Heliocentric radial velocity: 15,230 km/s
- Distance: 706 Mly (216.5 Mpc)
- Apparent magnitude (V): 0.079
- Apparent magnitude (B): 0.104

Characteristics
- Type: Merger; Sy1, Sy2
- Notable features: luminous infrared galaxy, double active galactic nucleus, seyfert galaxy

Other designations
- UGC 8850, PGC 49538, KUG 1353+186, MCG +03-36-005, IRAS 13536+1836, TXS 1353+186

Markarian 463 (Mrk 463) known as UGC 8850, is a galaxy merger located in the constellation Boötes. It is located 706 million light years from Earth. It is classified a double nucleus Seyfert galaxy.

== Characteristics ==
Markarian 463 is a late stage galaxy merger, a product of two gas-rich spiral galaxies colliding with one another. According to optical and near-infrared observations, the galaxy is shown to have a complex morphology with star forming clumps and curved tidal tails. It has a luminosity of LIR (8–1000μm) = 10^{11.8} L_{Θ} making it a luminous infrared galaxy. It contains a compact radio flux in either linear or elongated structure. Using spectra captured by the Infrared Spectrograph installed on Spitzer Space Telescope, emission lines are detected in Markarian 463 hinting a warm supply of molecular gas.

A broadband X-ray spectral analysis revealed two obscured nuclei designated as Markarian 463W and Markarian 463E, with an estimated projected separation of ~ 3.8 kiloparsec. This finding makes the galaxy a dual active galactic nucleus and is the third closest physical pair known after NGC 6240 and NGC 3758. The two nuclei has a luminosity of L_{2–10keV} = 1.5×10^{43} and 3.8×10^{42} erg cm^{−2} s^{−1}. Both are active and are expected to drawn close to each other over timescales of 10^{8} years.

The western nucleus has a moderate radio luminosity equivalent of an extremely luminous starburst galaxy or a Seyfert galaxy through imaging detections at 6 and 20 centimeters. The eastern nucleus however, is much brighter compared to the western nucleus, and is classified a type II Seyfert galaxy. It is found offset from its peak flux and shows polarized conical wind. With a half-opening angle of ~ 15 degrees, its wind displays three mass ejection periods. Using infrared spectroscopy, the eastern nucleus hosts a hidden Seyfert 1 nucleus located southwards but not co-spatial.

According to Chandra X-ray data, the supermassive black hole in the nucleus of Markarian 463E has a much higher accretion rate of ~ 5x. It is also associated with emission and continuum lines. It is also shown it is older compared to the nucleus of Markarian 463W, given the northern outflowing cloud and southern emission region appears generally aligned with the biconical gradient. An ALMA ^{12}CO (2–1) observation also finds the two nuclei have molecular gas reservoirs estimated of ~ 10^{9} M_{Θ} and ~ 5 × 10^{8} M_{Θ} respectively. Given enough molecular gas provided, it is enough to feed both black holes in the galaxy.

Markarian 463 has an optical jet originating from the Seyfert nucleus according to Hubble Space Telescope imaging. The jet is found to reach the end at the radio source found 1.2 arcsecs away, and is measured 0.84 arcsecs with a position angle of 182 degrees.

Part of the galaxy shows emission due to oxygen, first identified with Hubble. This was interpreted as a possible extended emission-line region (EELR).

== Gallery ==
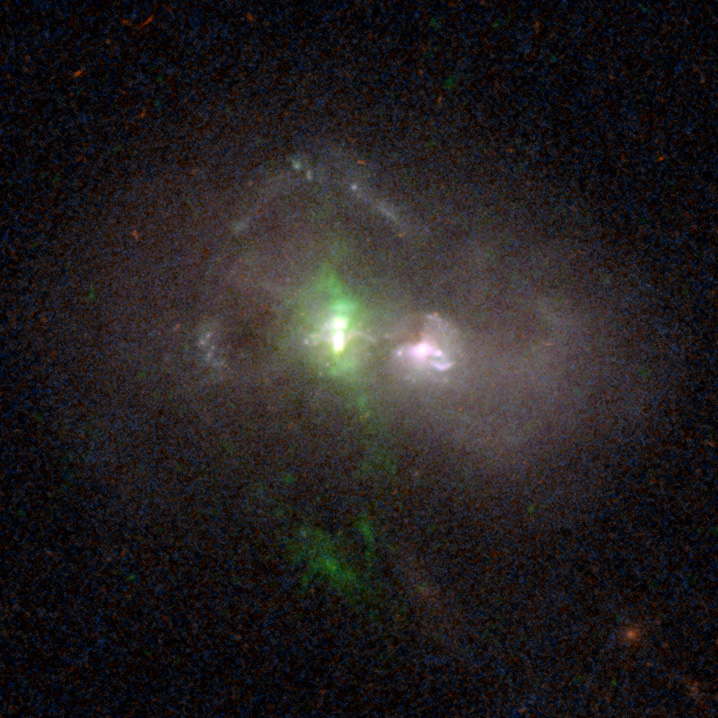
Hubble image of Mrk 463, with oxygen being green

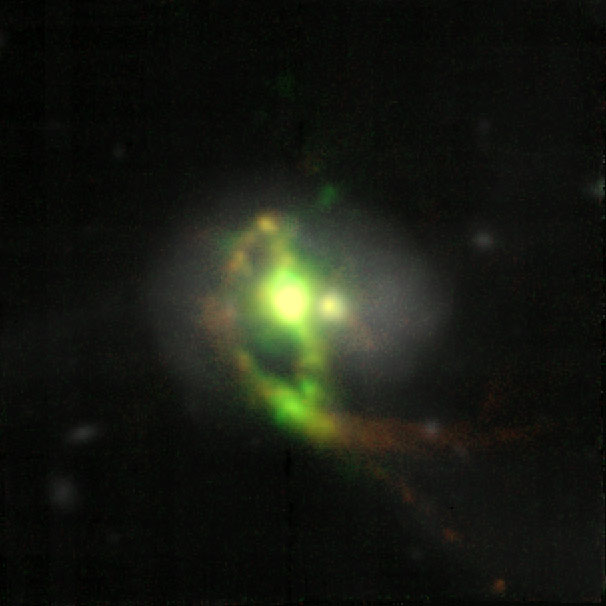
VLT MUSE image of Mrk 463, with H-alpha being orange and oxygen being green

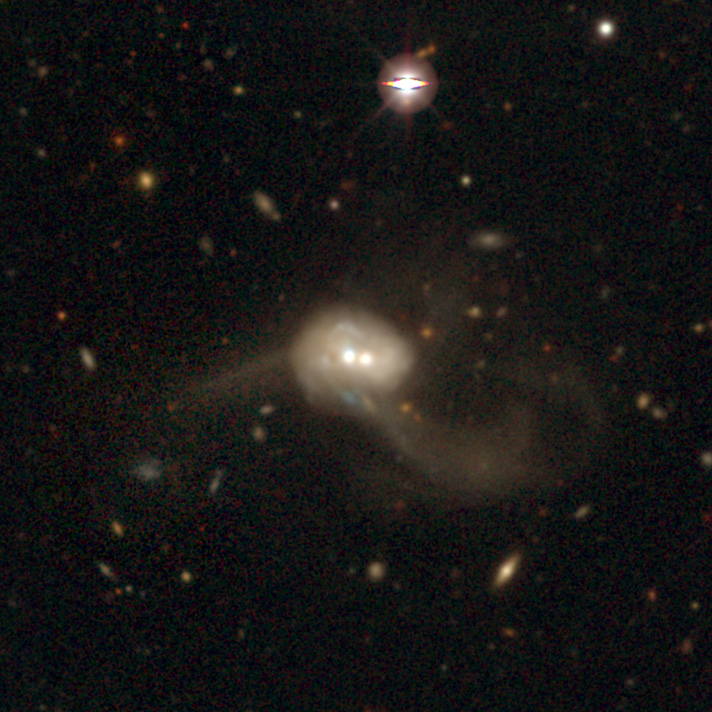
Mrk 463 in wide view with legacy surveys, showing the tidal arms
