= 3C 180 =

Seyfert type 2 galaxy in the constellation of Monoceros

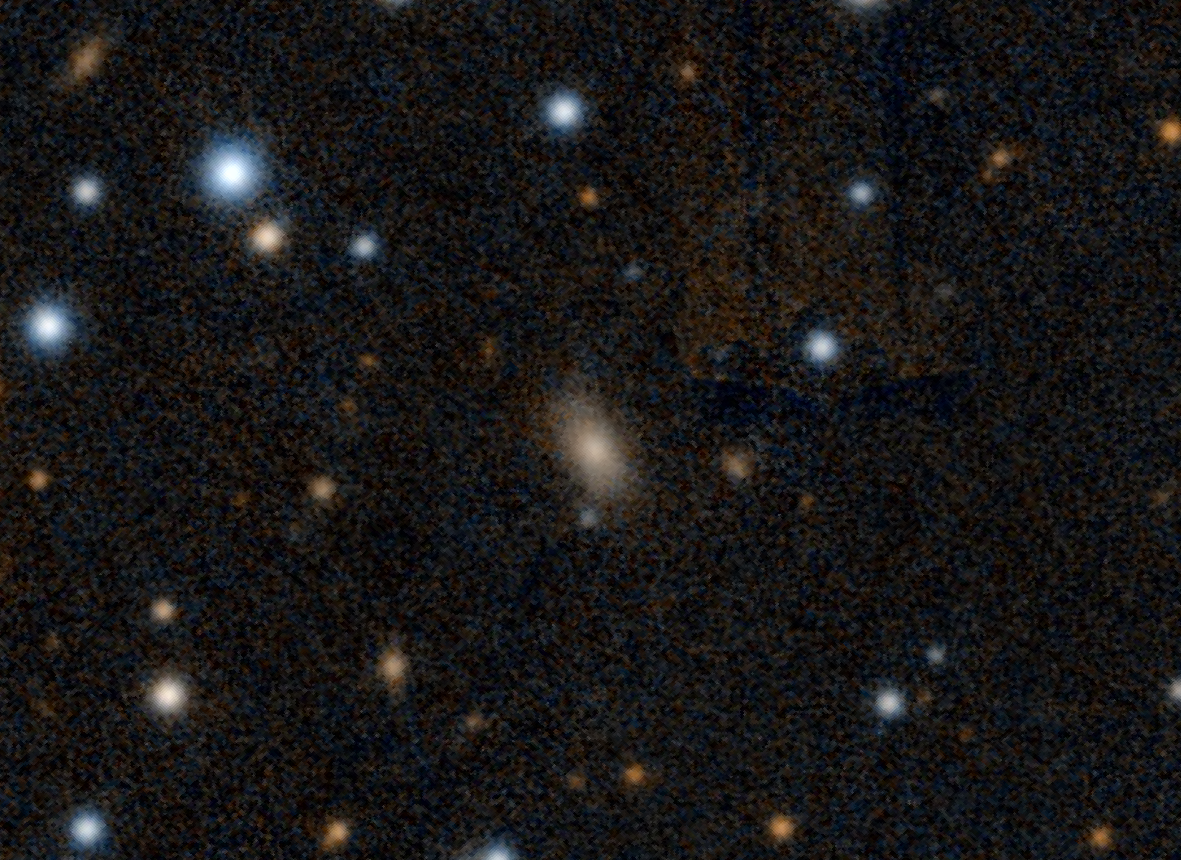
- Pan-STARRS image of 3C 180

Observation data (J2000.0 epoch)
- Constellation: Monoceros
- Right ascension: 07^{h} 27^{m} 04.49^{s}
- Declination: −02° 04′ 42.30″
- Redshift: 0.220000
- Heliocentric radial velocity: 65,954 km/s
- Distance: 2.736 Gly

Characteristics
- Type: Radio galaxy HEG
- Size: ~309,000 ly (94.7 kpc) (estimated)

Other designations
- PKS 0724−01, 4C −02.31, DA 234, OI −041, 2MASX J07270487−0204301, NRAO 0265, TXS 0724−019, MSH 07−006, Cul 0724−019, PAPER J111.71−02.09

3C 180 is a Seyfert type 2 galaxy located in the constellation of Monoceros. The redshift of the galaxy is estimated to be (z) 0.220 and it was first recorded in the Third Cambridge Catalogue of Radio Sources in 1962.

== Description ==
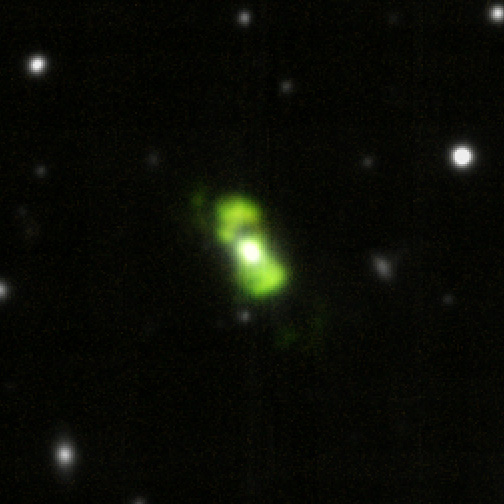
VLT MUSE image of the EELR with oxygen in green and H-alpha in orange.

3C 180 is classified as a high-excitation radio galaxy with a Fanaroff-Riley Type II classification. The host galaxy is a large elliptical galaxy residing inside a galaxy cluster. It is described to have a boxy appearance based on Hubble Space Telescope observations. The nucleus of the galaxy is disturbed and it has weak radio emission, based on long-slit spectroscopy observations. The dust morphology of the galaxy has patches of faint and thin dust lanes.

The galaxy is known to have an extended emission-line region (EELR). The region is described as having a length of 45 kiloparsecs on both sides with an orientation along the direction of the radio axis. There is a rotating structure present in the EELR which displays a full amplitude of 700 kilometers per seconds, however it is also showing signs of velocity fluctuations. A series of arc-like features surround the galaxy's nucleus. A narrow-line region, described as lobsided, was also discovered in the galaxy, with the emission forming into a bi-conical series of shells, that extends both northeast and southeast from the core.

In 2021 it was confirmed the galaxy displays evidence of nuclear outflows. The outflows show a compact gas morphology in the inner regions, reaching up to 8.5 kiloparsecs from the nucleus position. The gas also reaches the southeast section of the galaxy, with its velocity measurement reaching the maximum value of 2450 kilometers per seconds. A blue component is seen dominating the northwest area.
