= 3C 300 =

Radio galaxy in the constellation of Boötes

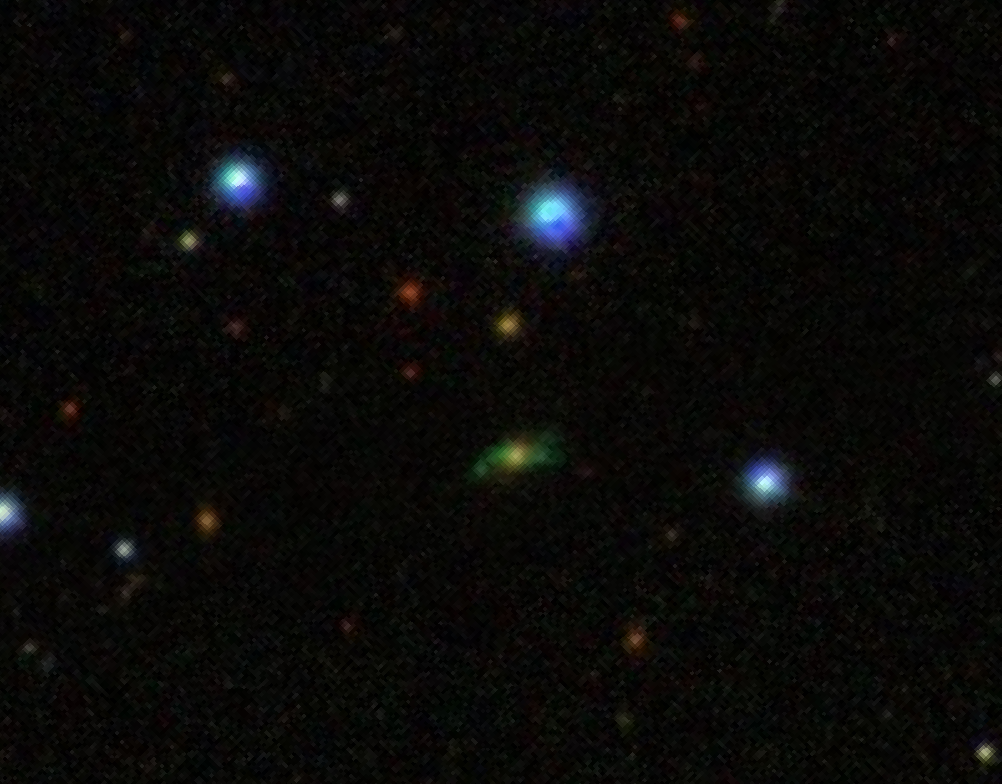
- SDSS image of 3C 300.

Observation data (J2000.0 epoch)
- Constellation: Boötes
- Right ascension: 14^{h} 23^{m} 01.00^{s}
- Declination: +19° 35′ 17.98″
- Redshift: 0.270000
- Heliocentric radial velocity: 80,944 km/s
- Distance: 3.243 Gly
- Apparent magnitude (V): 18.73

Characteristics
- Type: E;Radio galaxy HEG

Other designations
- 4C +19.46, PKS 1420+19, DA 366, OQ +134, NRAO 0443, TXS 1420+198, CoNFIG 192, Cul 1420+198

3C 300 is a radio galaxy located in the constellation of Boötes. The redshift of the object is (z) 0.270 and it was first discovered as a radio source in 1959. It was subsequently identified with a galaxy counterpart in June 1966 and designated as 4C 19.46 by the Fourth Cambridge Survey in 1968.

== Description ==
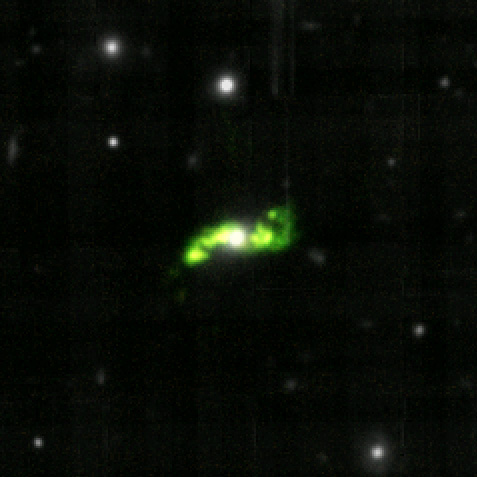
VLT MUSE image of the EELR with oxygen in green and H-alpha in orange.

3C 300 is a high-excitation Fanaroff-Riley Class Type 2 radio galaxy, hosted by a compact elliptical galaxy that is located in a poor galaxy cluster. The appearance of the galaxy is described as highly elongated with faint tidal distortions, a boxy isophotal structure and an apparent V magnitude of 19.0. A small companion galaxy is located 8.14 arcseconds away in the west direction, shown to be heavily involved in the interaction and merging process with the galaxy. There are also high surface brightness regions in the galaxy along with a patch of radio emission located east from its extended nucleus. The total star formation of 3C 300 is 3.3^{+0.7}_{-0.7} M_{☉} per year, with a total infrared luminosity of 19.0^{+3.8}_{-4.1} × 10^{9} L_{☉}.

The extended emission-line region (EELR) of 3C 300, has an S-shaped morphology with a total extent of 60 kiloparsecs in east to west direction and displaying rotation that is well-ordered along the position of its major radio axis. Diffused emission is seen on the north and west side of the region. Nuclear outflows are evident, with the outflow being mainly influenced by a blue component whose maximum velocity peaks at 2160 kilometers per seconds.

The radio source of 3C 300 is classified as a double, based on observations made by J.M. Riley and G.G. Pooley using the Cambridge 50-km Telescope in 1975. When observed on a radio map, the source contains multiple components with a total spectra index value of 0.83 ± 0.10. High resolution imaging made by the Very Long Baseline Array (VLA) would paint a different picture for the source, describing it as asymmetrical with a hotspot located in the eastern direction. When further imaged, the hotspot has a double structure with an elongated component at its western edge and a brighter component that is being extended back towards the radio core position. Two other components are located inside a high surface brightness area. The northern radio lobe of 3C 300 displays a high speed of 0.026 ± 0.045c, compared to its shorter southern radio lobe. This implies the northern radio lobe is residing within a low external gas density area.

A jet is present inside the western radio lobe of 3C 300, from the core to the terminating point of the hotspot region. This jet might also be bent too, given the change of angle between 10° and 15°. An observation made in 1998 found the jet is straight with a flux density of 8.06 GHz and has a length of 4.70 kiloparsecs. A supermassive black hole mass of 12.7^{+5.6}_{-5.0} × 10^{7} M_{☉} has been estimated for the galaxy.
