= 3C 368 =

Radio galaxy in the constellation of Ophiuchus

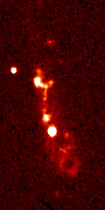
- HST image of 3C 368.

Observation data (J2000.0 epoch)
- Constellation: Ophiuchus
- Right ascension: 18^{h} 05^{m} 06.39^{s}
- Declination: +11° 01′ 32.73″
- Redshift: 1.131000
- Heliocentric radial velocity: 339,065 km/s
- Distance: 8.434 Gly
- Apparent magnitude (B): 21.5

Characteristics
- Type: NLRG

Other designations
- 4C +11.54, PKS 1802+11, NRAO 0543, NVSS J180506+110132, TXS 1802+110, GLEAM J180506+110132

3C 368 is a distant radio galaxy located in the constellation of Ophiuchus. It has a redshift of (z) 1.131, identified via its strong emission lines from its spectrum, and was discovered as a radio source in 1959 by astronomers. The galaxy is classified as a merger product, undergoing an intensive wave of star formation.

== Description ==
3C 368 is classified as a Fanaroff-Riley Class type 2 radio galaxy. It has an extremely complex structure, with its central nucleus splitting into two different components. Its host galaxy is a large elliptical galaxy, with its surface brightness profile described as being both flat and extended. The profile of the galaxy is also said to be like the brightest cluster galaxies. There is infrared radio emission extending from its central radio core by 32 kiloparsecs, indicating the emission might be produced from either older red giant stars or younger red supergiants. The galaxy also has H II regions, with starbursts mainly dominated by a population of aged O-type stars. The total current star formation is estimated to be 147 M_{☉} per year and galaxy's age is around 3.3 × 10^{8} years.

The radio structure of 3C 368 is compact. When imaged with MERLIN, the source has two central components unresolved. Two radio knot features have been discovered. The southern knot is associated with the core and has a steep radio spectrum. The northern knot feature on the other hand, has a flat radio spectrum. Imaging at 5 GHz showed a radio jet is clearly visible from the northern knot leading towards the direction of the northern radio lobe. The regions of the galaxy also display little evidence of polarization, mainly in both of its lobes. The estimated rotation gradients for these lobes are 100 and 63 rad m^{−2}.

3C 368 has an extended emission-line region (EELR). The region is slightly diffused, and has an extent of more than 45 kiloparsecs. The ionized gas and doubly ionized magnesium emission line regions are located closer to its active galactic nucleus (AGN), while the doubly ionized oxygen regions coincide together with a radio component located southwards. Evidence also found the southern lobe is best described by an enveloping gas shell. Hubble Space Telescope (HST) imaging found the emission region is shaped as a cigar.
