= 3C 381 =

Radio galaxy in the constellation Lyra

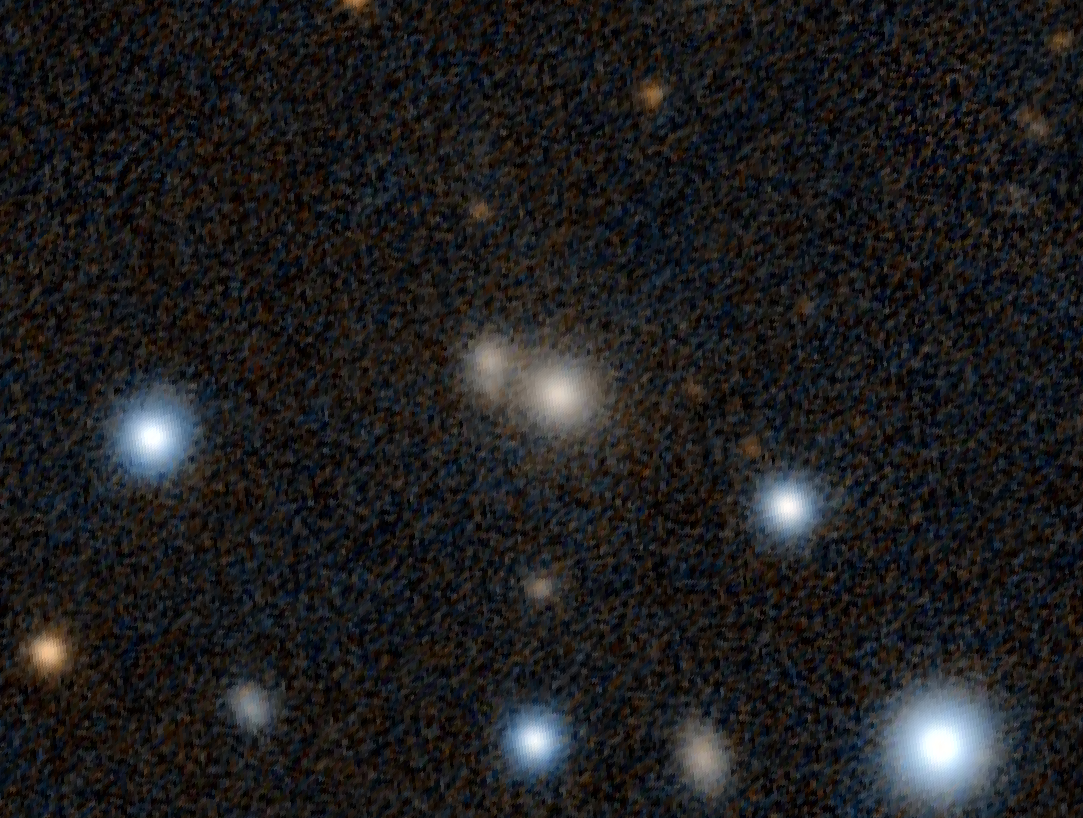
- Pan-STARRS image of radio galaxy 3C 381.

Observation data (J2000.0 epoch)
- Constellation: Lyra
- Right ascension: 18^{h} 33^{m} 46.30^{s}
- Declination: +47° 27′ 02.64″
- Redshift: 0.167400
- Heliocentric radial velocity: 50,185 km/s
- Distance: 2.146 Gly
- Apparent magnitude (B): 18.64

Characteristics
- Type: HEG BLRG
- Size: ~270,000 ly (82.8 kpc) (estimated)

Other designations
- PGC 62045, 4C +47.49, 2MASX J18334627+4727027, LHE 451, DA 455, OU +454, NRAO 0568

3C 381 is a radio galaxy located in the constellation of Lyra. The redshift of the object is (z) 0.167 and it was first recorded in the Third Cambridge Catalogue of Radio Sources survey in 1962. It is known to contain an extended emission-line region (EELR).

== Description ==
3C 381 is classified as a Fanaroff-Riley class Type 2 broad-line radio galaxy (BLRG), although the categorization of it being a narrow-line radio galaxy is debatable. Its host is a round elliptical galaxy located in a small galaxy group, described as having a high surface brightness profile and a smooth appearance. There is a companion galaxy located 5.5 arcseconds away from 3C 381 with a low-surface brightness profile. Further evidence shows these galaxies are gravitationally interacting, given the presence of tidal distortions and tidal tails that are pointing in both directions from the main galaxy's nucleus based on Hubble Space Telescope (HST) imaging. A faint extension feature is discovered in the north. The total star formation rate is 7.7^{+1.3}_{-1.3} × 10^{10} M_{☉} and the black hole mass is 11.8^{+5.8}_{-4.0} × 10^{7} M_{☉}.

The radio structure of 3C 381 is compact. Based on high resolution Very Large Array (VLA) radio imaging, the source has hotspots. The hotspot on the northern side is found to have a double substructure with a weak compact component located in the southwest. There is also another component located north-east, extended southwards and partially resolved. At the southernmost region a hotspot is also seen, but no compact component is present. Both of the radio lobes of the source have a steep radio spectrum at the curving bases, however the southern one is much larger compared to the northern one with an extent of 40.5 arcseconds. A faint doubly ionized oxygen emission filament curves around the north radio lobe boundary. Low-resolution mapping showed a bright bar feature in its northern lobe, which in turn is connected with a radio emission bridge to the hotspot region.

The galaxy has an extended emission-line region (EELR). The EELR is larger than the stellar component, with an extension of 12 arcseconds or 38 kiloparsecs in length. The kinematics are also disturbed, with high velocity gas components located both inside the central and outer parts of the EELR. Within the structure, velocity differences are observed, reaching up to around 600 kilometers per second.
