= 3C 79 =

Galaxy in the constellation Aries

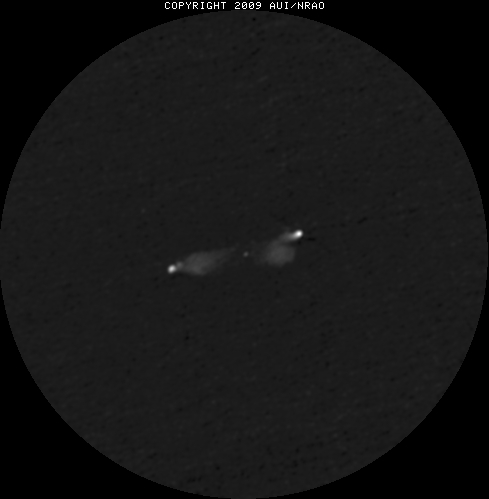

Observation data (Epoch J2000)
- Constellation: Aries
- Right ascension: 03^{h} 09^{m} 59.70^{s}
- Declination: +17° 05′ 58.0″
- Redshift: 0.2559
- Distance: 2.9 billion light-years (Light travel time); 3.2 billion light-years (present)
- Type: Sy2; FR II narrow-line radio galaxy
- Apparent dimensions (V): 0.25'X0.19'
- Apparent magnitude (V): 19.0

Other designations
- DA 93, LEDA 1524618, 3C 79, 4C 16.07, PGC 1524618, QSO B0307+169

3C 79 is a Seyfert Galaxy and a radio galaxy located in the constellation Aries. It is hosted by an elliptical galaxy described as elongated with a complex morphology.

According to radio mapping made by Very Large Array, 3C 79 has an asymmetric appearance. It has two radio lobes. The western lobe is found closely positioned to the radio core with diffused emission in south direction, while the eastern lobe is more aligned to the axis of the radio source.

The extended emission-line region (EELR) is almost certainly photoionized by the hidden quasar. This emission-line region has an X-shaped morphology with two of its structures having ordered rotation.
