= PKS 2250−41 =

Radio galaxy in the constellation Grus

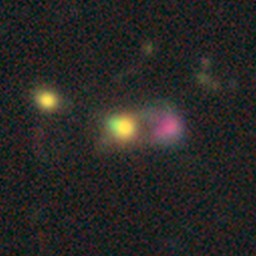
- The radio galaxy PKS 2250−41.

Observation data (J2000.0 epoch)
- Constellation: Grus
- Right ascension: 22^{h} 53^{m} 03.11^{s}
- Declination: −40° 57′ 46.71″
- Redshift: 0.309000
- Heliocentric radial velocity: 92,636 km/s
- Distance: 3.600 Gly

Characteristics
- Type: NLRG Sy2

Other designations
- LEDA 2831507, PKS J2253−4057, G4Jy 1795, Cul 2250−412, PMN J2253−4057

PKS 2250−41 is an intermediate redshifted radio galaxy located in the southern constellation of Grus. The redshift of the object is (z) 0.309 and it was first discovered as a strong radio source in 1992 by astronomers via a 6 centimeter Australia Telescope.

== Description ==
PKS 2250−41 is classified as a Fanaroff-Riley Class Type 2 radio galaxy. Its host is an elliptical galaxy belonging to a small galaxy group. A faint companion disc galaxy is found northeast from the host galaxy with a magnitude of 20.57 ± 0.12 and has the same redshift. Evidence pointed out the disc galaxy is also interacting, based on a faint radio bridge and its disturbed appearance towards the direction of the host galaxy. A much smaller galaxy is located southwest and it is also heavily involved in the interaction, given the presence of a western arc-like tail extension.

The host galaxy also displays an extended arc structure found measuring an approximate length of 50 kiloparsecs and located west from the continuum nucleus. There is evidence of fainter emission line arcs in the direction of east. An X-shaped structure is found forming from these emission lines at the center of the nucleus.

Studies showed PKS 2250−41 has an extended emission-line region (EELR). Based on studies, the structure of the region is described as elliptical with the ellipse's major axis being aligned along the position angle of 80°. The region is also showed to be slightly offset in between its emission line and continuum peaks, with the lines mainly peaking at 0.55 ± 0.03 arcseconds east. An observation made in 1999, resolved the emission lines into two kinetic components, mainly a narrow component and a broad component. The narrow component has a higher ionization level but has weak helium emission. Meanwhile, the broad component has a lower ionization level.

The radio structure of the source is mainly made up of two asymmetrical radio lobes on opposite sides, only slightly resolved at 5 GHz frequencies. At 8 GHz, the two radio lobes are still slightly resolved but an extended structure of low-surface brightness, is now seen. No evidence of a radio core is found. Both the lobes are positioned 4.9 and 11.9 arcseconds from the nucleus shown on V-bands. Evidence has confirmed the emission-line arc is wrapping around the western lobe on its outer rim area.
