= PKS 1932−46 =

Radio galaxy in the constellation Telescopium

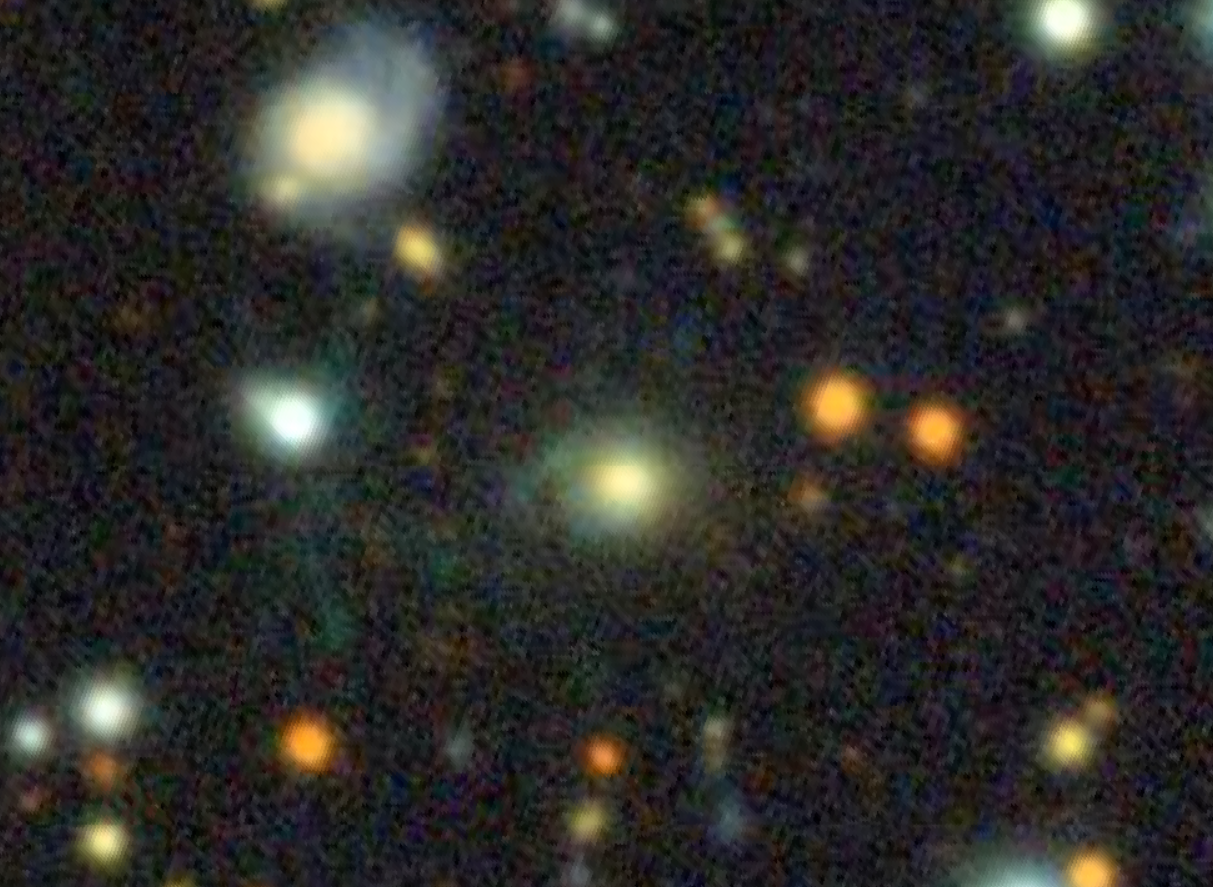
- DESI Legacy Surveys image of PKS 1932−46

Observation data (J2000.0 epoch)
- Constellation: Telescopium
- Right ascension: 19^{h} 35^{m} 56.43^{s}
- Declination: −46° 20′ 40.50″
- Redshift: 0.230700
- Heliocentric radial velocity: 69,162 km/s
- Distance: 2.833 Gly
- Apparent magnitude (V): 19.9

Characteristics
- Type: NLRG;BLRG Sy2

Other designations
- PKS B1932−464, LEDA 2830107, MRC 1932−464, SUMSS J193557−464038, Cul 1932−464, OCARS 1932−464, PAPER J294.05−46.38

PKS 1932−46 is a broad-line radio galaxy located in the constellation of Telescopium. The redshift of the galaxy is (z) 0.230 and it was first identified as an astronomical radio source in the Parkes Catalogue survey in 1970.

== Description ==
PKS 1932−46 has strong detections of emission lines towards the eastern direction from its nucleus. The host galaxy is a large elliptical galaxy with a Fanaroff-Riley Class Type 2 radio morphology and has a total radio power of 5.5 × 10^{26} W Hz^{−1}. It has a mainly old stellar population around 12 billion years old, although a very young stellar population is suggested. A disturbed companion with a double nucleus is found north-east from the host galaxy, confirming they are gravitationally interacting. Further evidence of the interaction is two tidal tails extending in both directions from the galaxies. The nucleus of PKS 1932−46 has irregular structures surrounding it, based on r-band imaging.

The radio source of the galaxy has been classified as a double, containing two asymmetrical radio lobes with bright hot spot features. Both lobes are located 54 and 35 kiloparsecs away from the nucleus. The lobe of the western side has strong polarization signs compared to the lobe on the eastern side. A small rotation measure is found on the western lobe with a range between -14 and 35 rad m^{−2}.

The galaxy has an extended emission line region (EELR). When observed, the region is found to be mainly complex. The center of the region close to the active galactic nucleus displays several velocity structures with detections of broad line widths reaching up to 1000 kilometer per seconds. However, the outer regions of the EELR lacks disturbed kinematics. Further evidence also showed the EELR is also reaching the outer boundaries of the western lobe. This EELR has also been suggested to be classified as star-forming halo feature likely triggered by tidal debris from the companion, with the gas showing an irregular morphology that is described as knotty and with a total extent of 160 kiloparsecs.
