= PKS 2356−61 =

Seyfert 2 and radio galaxy in the constellation of Tucana

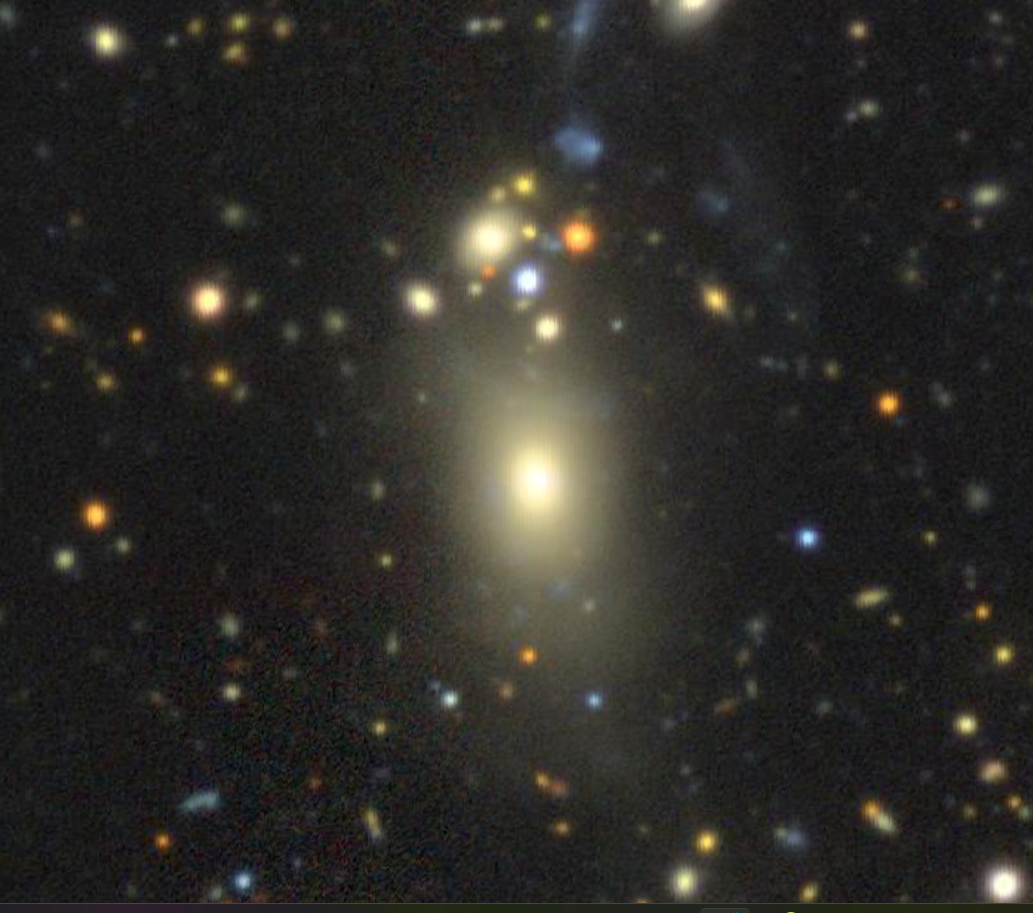
- The radio galaxy PKS 2356−61

Observation data (J2000.0 epoch)
- Constellation: Tucana
- Right ascension: 23^{h} 59^{m} 04.30^{s}
- Declination: −60° 54′ 59.18″
- Redshift: 0.096307
- Heliocentric radial velocity: 28872 km/s
- Distance: 1.292 Gly
- Apparent magnitude (B): 16.61

Characteristics
- Type: NLRG
- Size: ~185,700 ly (56.93 kpc) (estimated)

Other designations
- 2MASX J23590436−6054594, 2MASS J23590432−6054590, PGC 73132, G4Jy 1863, MSH 23−604, PKS B2356−611, SWIFT J2359.3−6058, WMAP 187

PKS 2356−61 is an active Seyfert type 2 galaxy located in the Southern constellation of Tucana. The redshift of the galaxy is (z) 0.096 and it was first discovered in the Parkes Catalogue of Radio Sources survey by astronomers in 1964. The galaxy is also located close to the radio source axis.

== Description ==
PKS 2356−61 is classified as a giant narrow-line radio galaxy (GRG) with a Fanaroff-Riley Class Type II morphology. The host galaxy is an E3 elliptical based on a standard de Vaucouleurs law with total radius of 5.6 arcseconds. There is a possible dust lane feature present in the galaxy. Evidence also pointed it as the result of multiple galaxy mergers, given it shows an irregular arc-like feature on its northern side and shell structures both located south and towards northeast. Two more faint arc-like features are discovered northwest and southeast by 82 and 118 kiloparsecs from the center.

The radio structure of PKS 2356−61 is compact. Earlier imaging at 1410 MHz, depicted it as elongated, made up of a series of multiple components closely aligning with the radio axis. Two of these components are the strongest while the polarization is spread out unevenly, mainly near the faintest known component and two southernmost components. Radio imaging made by the Australia Telescope Compact Array has discovered traces of undetected hotspots with short and bright tail features being directed to the center from the hotspots. An extension is seen connecting from the northwest radio lobe. A radio core has been found with a flux density of 0.53×10^{40} erg s^{−1}. Traces of X-ray emission is found mostly around the source and the bases of the radio lobes.

PKS 2356−61 shows a presence of an extended emission-line region. Based on studies, the region is divided into two separate distinctive regions, mainly a central component and a tail component. The central component is described to have a velocity width of 300–400 km s^{−1}. while the tail component is found elongating away from the region center and has a lower velocity width between 120 and 150 km s^{−1}. A close faint Hydrogen-alpha emitting galaxy is located 60 kiloparsecs towards north from the host galaxy.
