= 3C 171 =

Galaxy located in the constellation Lynx

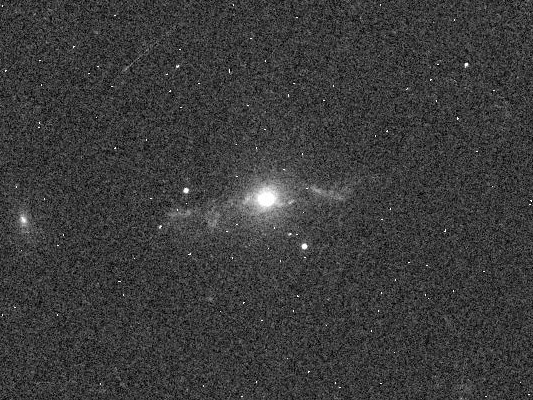
- 3C 171 by the Hubble Space Telescope

Observation data (J2000 epoch)
- Constellation: Lynx
- Right ascension: 06^{h} 55^{m} 14.7^{s}
- Declination: +54° 08′ 89″
- Redshift: 0.238400
- Distance: 930 megaparsecs (3.0×10^{9} ly) h^{−1}_{0.73}
- Apparent magnitude (V): 19.08

Characteristics
- Type: Sy2, Rad, AGN, QSO, G G, FR II, Sy 2

Other designations
- LEDA 2817570, 3C 171, 4C +54.11, QSO B0651+542

3C 171 is a Seyfert galaxy located in the constellation Lynx, classified as a radio galaxy, containing an extended emission-line region. It is also a relatively isolated galaxy, not belonging to any other rich galaxy clusters.

The inner regions of 3C 171 is said to be similar to an ordinary Fanaroff-Riley Class 2, but instead of radio lobes, it contains low-surface brightness plumes. Using the multi-radio-frequency study, the plumes of 3C 171 are shown to flow in a reverse direction from both the primary and secondary hotspots, found separated. In one of the plumes located north-west, the region shows enhanced brightness, making it a quasi-hotspot. Further evidence also points the emission lines in 3C 171 are made up of plasma, hinting the gas might be cooling.

== See also ==
- Lists of galaxies
