= 3C 63 =

Radio galaxy located in the constellation Cetus

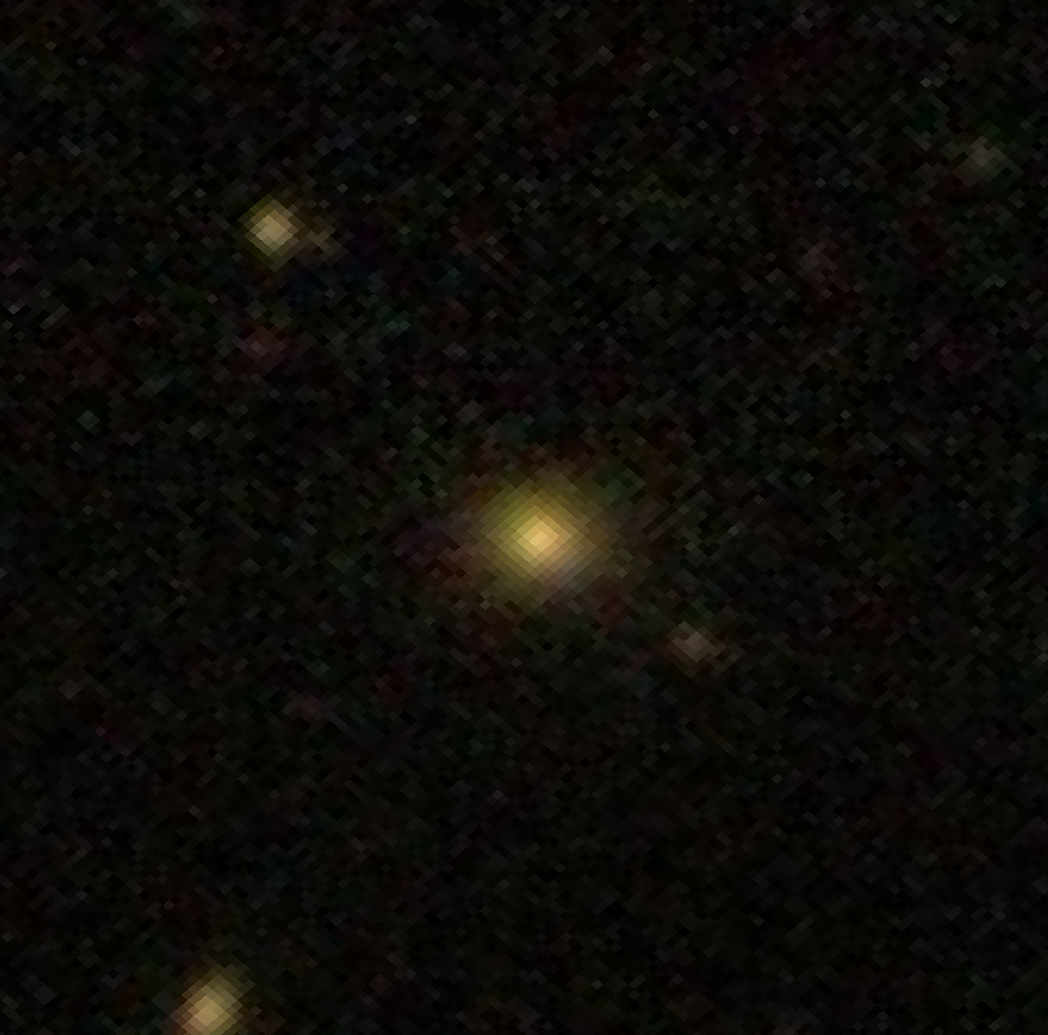
- SDSS image of 3C 63

Observation data (J2000.0 epoch)
- Constellation: Cetus
- Right ascension: 02^{h} 20^{m} 54.32^{s}
- Declination: −01° 56′ 52.59″
- Redshift: 0.175000
- Heliocentric radial velocity: 52,464 km/s
- Distance: 2,524.6 ± 204.0 Mly (774.06 ± 62.56 Mpc)
- Apparent magnitude (V): 17.80

Characteristics
- Type: Radio galaxy SLAGN

Other designations
- 4C −02.10, PKS 0218−02, LEDA 1105760, OD −031, NVSS J022054−015651, TXS 0218−021, Cul 0218−021

3C 63 is a radio galaxy located in the constellation of Cetus. The redshift of the object is (z) 0.175 and it was first discovered as an astronomical radio source by astronomers in 1959. but it also has been observed in 1962, and later designated as PKS 0218−02 by the Parkes Observatory in 1966.

== Description ==
3C 63 is a low-redshift, high-excitation Fanaroff–Riley Class Type 2 radio galaxy. The host galaxy is classified as a disturbed elliptical galaxy with a filament structure penetrating through its nucleus and has a total surface brightness of 20.43. Broad-band imaging showed it is surrounded by several other galaxies within a 125 kiloparsec radius.

3C 63 has an extended emission-line region. The region has interstellar gas extending by 25 kiloparsecs along the position angle of 80°. The western side of the region displays a series of emission lines that are aligning together with the radio axis. The region is also extending towards the north from its southern hotspot region, forming an arc that wraps around the radio lobe located on the southern direction by 33 kiloparsecs from the nucleus. Other observations also found the region has an S-shaped morphology, with the gas displaying velocity speeds of 550 kilometers per seconds and broad-line widths that reach between 500 and 600 kilometers per seconds at full width at half maximum.

The radio source of 3C 63 is compact. When observed with the Very Large Array (VLA), it is found to have a radio core that has either a slight inverted or a flat radio spectrum. The source has an X-shaped morphology, with faint radio emission regions making up part of the wing features, found strongly polarized at 50% in total. There are two bright hotspots separated by 604 kiloparsecs and a low–surface brightness radio emission bridge linking the hotspots and the main galaxy nucleus, gradually elongating away towards the southwest direction. X-ray emission is detected around the nucleus also.

A study of 3C 63 published in 2021 reported the detection of nuclear outflows. When observed, the gas of the outflows is described as having a circle shape with a measured radius of 1.14 kiloparsecs and is elongated towards the southeast. A blue component was discovered with a measured velocity of 1900 kilometers per seconds.
