= 3C 353 =

Radio galaxy in the constellation Ophiuchus

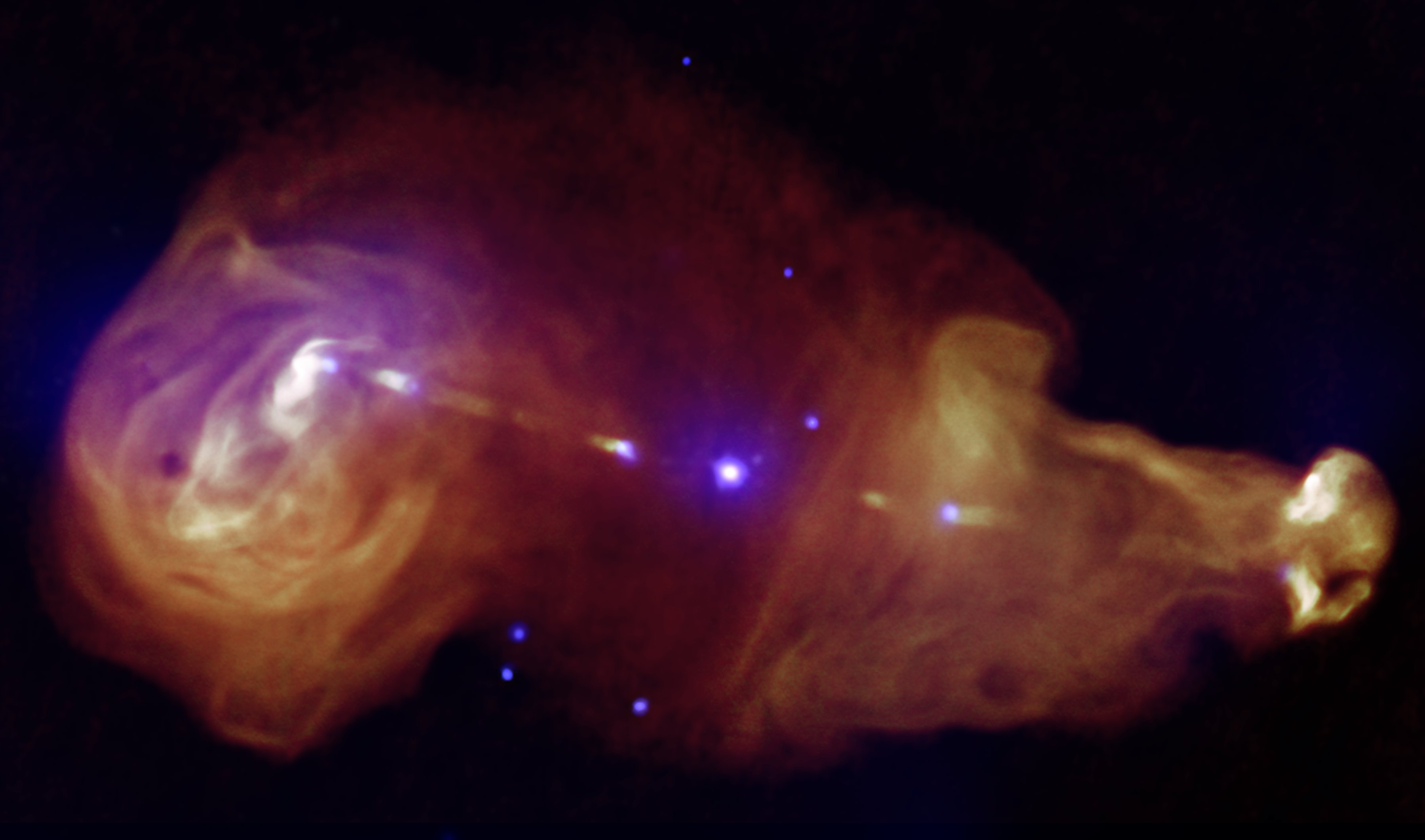
- The radio galaxy 3C 353, captured by Chandra X-ray Observatory

Observation data (J2000 epoch)
- Constellation: Ophiuchus
- Right ascension: 17^{h} 20^{m} 28.17^{s}
- Declination: −00° 58′ 47.71″
- Redshift: 0.030421
- Heliocentric radial velocity: 9120 km/s
- Distance: 465 Mly (142.75 Mpc)

Characteristics
- Type: SA0, NLRG LEG
- Size: ~130,000 ly (41 kpc) (estimated)

Other designations
- 4C –00.67, 2MASX J17202814–0058471, PGC 60102, CTA 076, DA 434, NRAO 524, NSA 147925, PKS B1717–009, TXS 1717–009, CXO J172028.1–005846, MRC 1717–009

3C 353 is a powerful radio galaxy located in the constellation of Ophiuchus. The redshift of the galaxy is (z) 0.030 and it was initially thought to be a radio star in 1959 where it was designated as 2C 1473. In 1964, this was identified with a galaxy counterpart. It is the fourth brightest source detected after Hercules A, Messier 87 and Cygnus A.

== Description ==
3C 353 is a giant elliptical galaxy that has a LINER optical spectrum and an undisturbed appearance. A dominating member of the ZW 1718-0108 galaxy cluster, the galaxy mainly contains a double-lobed radio structure with Fanaroff-Riley Class Type II radio morphology. The total radio luminosity of the source is estimated to be 5h^{−2} × 10^{25} W Hz^{−1}. Radio imaging made with the Very Large Array (VLA) found there are two radio jets which contain enhanced diffused brightness regions, roughly parallel to one another. The main jet appears as straight, but it is mainly aligned with the nucleus instead of towards the nuclear point.

When imaged with the VLA the jets of 3C 353 are shown to have total-intensity profiles that are classified as flat-topped, with jet radio emission that mainly originates from a thick area which the magnetic field has no signs of a component that is traversing towards the jet's axis.

The rest of the source is depicted as extended. Based on radio imaging, the radio lobes are different to one another. The eastern part of the lobe has a rounded appearance with evidence of sharp edges while the western part of the lobe has an elongated and irregular appearance. A weak radio core is found near the center of the nucleus region. Weak traces of ultraviolet emission has been detected in the galaxy based on ultraviolet imaging. There is also X-ray emission present in some parts of the galaxy including the nucleus, both jets and one of the radio lobes.
