= NGC 5514 =

Galaxy in the constellation Boötes

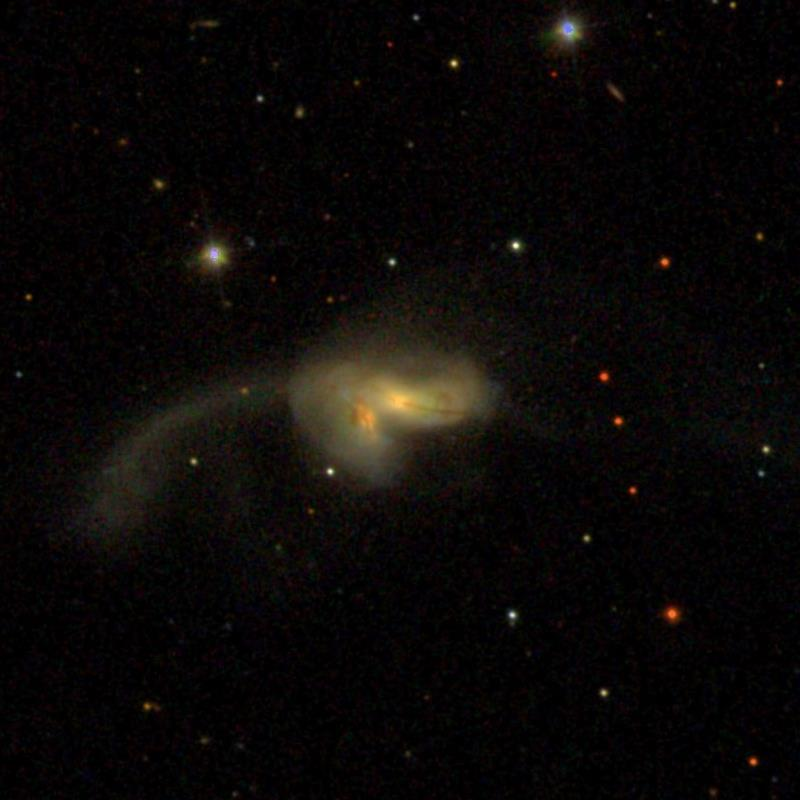
- SDSS image of NGC 5514

Observation data (J2000 epoch)
- Constellation: Boötes
- Right ascension: 14^{h} 13^{m} 38.690^{s}
- Declination: +07° 39′ 37.35″
- Redshift: 0.024350
- Heliocentric radial velocity: 7,300 km/s
- Distance: 346.8 Mly (106.33 Mpc)
- Apparent magnitude (B): 14.2

Characteristics
- Type: S?
- Size: ~256,500 ly (78.65 kpc) (estimated)
- Notable features: Interacting galaxies, infrared bright

Other designations
- NGC 5514, UGC 9102, PGC 50809/93124

NGC 5514 is a pair of merging disk galaxies in the northern constellation of Boötes. They were discovered by German astronomer Heinrich d'Arrest on April 26, 1865. The galaxies are located at an estimated distance of 347 million light-years. The morphology of the system is similar to the Antennae Galaxies, NGC 4038/NGC 4039. A distinct tail extends to the east for an angular distance of 1.5′. There is a fainter tail extending a comparable distance to the west. This galaxy pair likely forms a small group with the nearby spiral galaxy NGC 5519.

This appears to be a collision between two galaxies of unequal mass, having a 2:1 mass ratio. They display activity of the LINER type, but this is located in two regions in the outer parts away from the combined nucleus. These may be large shock regions caused by the collision. There are two corresponding starburst regions, one of which has outflows that have created a supergiant galactic bubble.

One supernova has been observed in NGC 5514: SN 2019igh (type IIb, mag. 19.05).

== See also ==
- List of NGC objects (5001–6000)
