= NGC 3341 =

Peculiar galaxy in the constellation Sextans

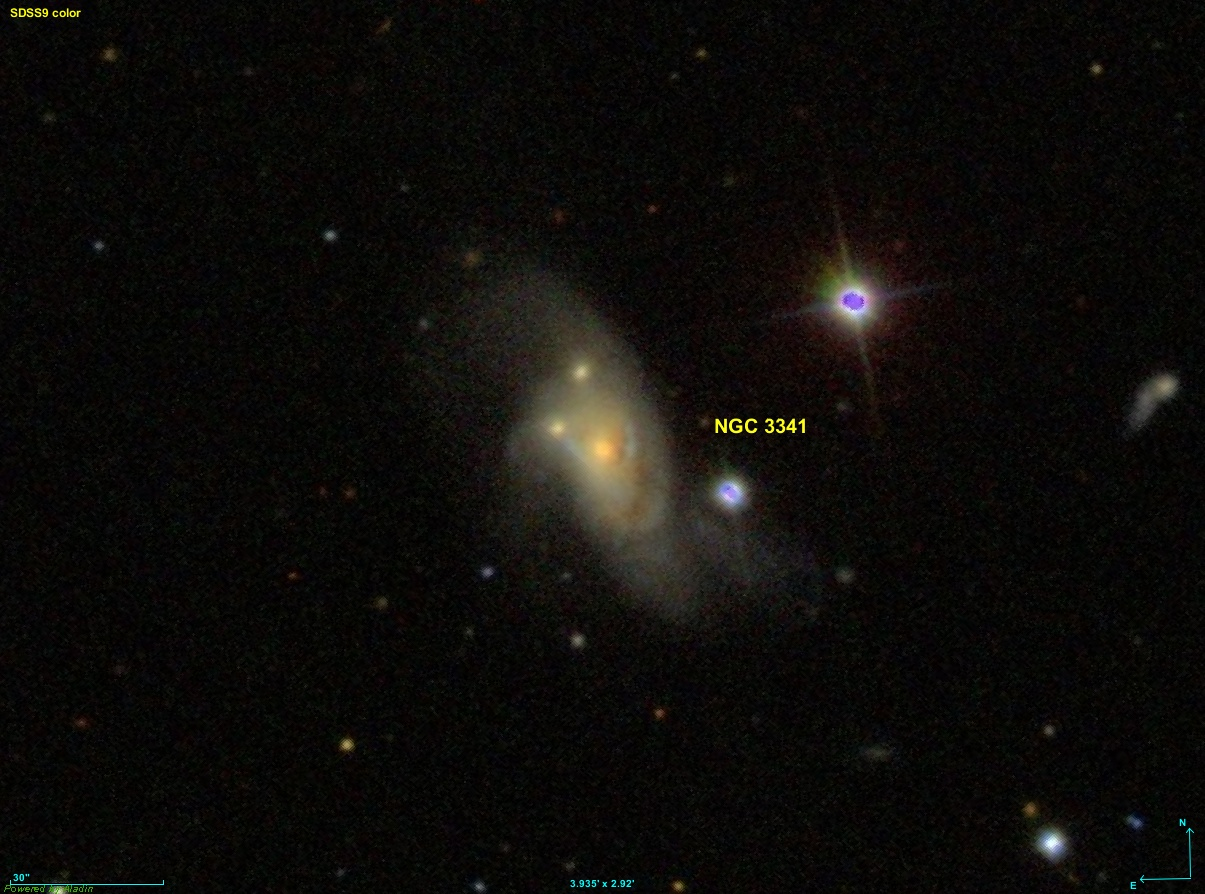
- The peculiar disk galaxy, NGC 3341.

Observation data (J2000 epoch)
- Constellation: Sextans
- Right ascension: 10^{h} 42^{m} 31.49^{s}
- Declination: +05° 02′ 38.08″
- Redshift: 0.027339
- Heliocentric radial velocity: 8,196 km/s
- Distance: 415 Mly (127.23 Mpc)
- Apparent magnitude (V): 0.067
- Apparent magnitude (B): 0.089

Characteristics
- Type: PECULR
- Size: 170,000 ly (estimated)
- Apparent size (V): 1.4' × 0.4'

Other designations
- UGC 5831, PGC 31915, MCG +01-27-031, CGCG 037-124

NGC 3341 is a peculiar galaxy located in the constellation of Sextans. It is located 415 million light years away from Earth and has a diameter of 170,000 light years. It was discovered by Albert Marth on March 22, 1865, who described the object as "very faint and small". The galaxy is classified a minor galaxy merger system, with two known companions revealed as offset active galactic nuclei (AGN).

== Characteristics ==
NGC 3341 is classified as a giant disk galaxy located at redshift 0.027. It has a magnitude of M_{B} = -20.3 with a mass of ≈ 1 × 10^{11} M_{Θ}. The galaxy has two smaller companions of low mass located north from the galaxy with an estimated distance of 5.1 and 8.4 kiloparsecs respectively.

Further observations by astronomers, classified the two offset nuclei of NGC 3341 as dwarf ellipticals or budge remnants of spiral galaxies, whose disk structures were tidal stripped as they coalesced into the larger primary galaxy. According to observations made by Foord and his colleagues, they found the primary nucleus of NGC 3341 has a 0.5-8 keV flux with luminosity of 3.63^{+0.07}_{-0.05} in harmony with a rest-frame luminosity of 8.54^{+0.41}_{-0.33} × 10^{41} erg s^{−1}. The secondary nucleus on the other hand, has an observed 0.5-8 keV flux of 2.7^{+0.6}_{-0.8} × 10-15 erg s^{−1} cm^{−2} s^{−1}. Despite the primary nucleus having an X-ray luminosity of L_{X} > 1 × 10^{41} erg s^{−1}, the second doesn't.

What is more stranger about the nuclei of NGC 3341, is both of them have different classifications. One is classified a Seyfert type II while the other is a LINER containing weak emission lines. However, the primary nucleus in NGC 3341 contains an emission-line spectrum. Based on the optical spectra of the two nuclei, it is suggested NGC 3341 might well be a dual AGN or a triple AGN system. But because the secondary nucleus never met the X-ray luminosity standards, the merger system of NGC 3341 actually contains a sole AGN.
