= Markarian 1014 =

Quasar in the constellation Cetus

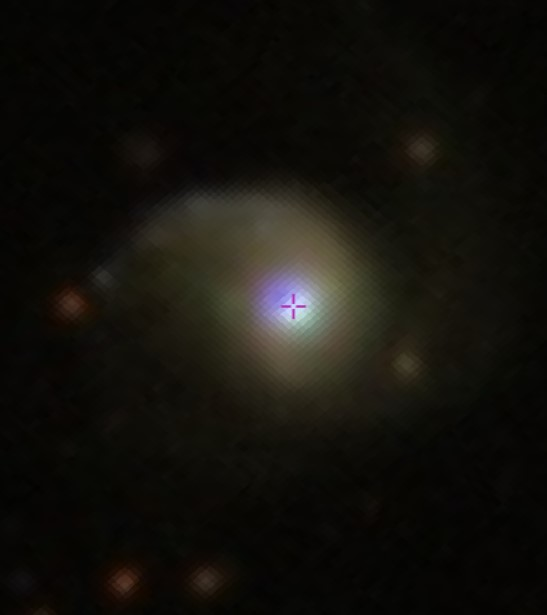
- SDSS image of Markarian 1014

Observation data (J2000.0 epoch)
- Constellation: Cetus
- Right ascension: 01^{h} 59^{m} 50.24^{s}
- Declination: +00° 23′ 40.66″
- Redshift: 0.163110
- Heliocentric radial velocity: 48,899 km/s
- Distance: 2.473 Gly (758.22 Mpc)
- Apparent magnitude (V): 15.87
- Apparent magnitude (B): 16.08

Characteristics
- Type: Bulge/disc, Sy 1
- Size: ~775,000 ly (237.62 kpc) (estimated)
- Notable features: Luminous infrared galaxy

Other designations
- PG 0157+001, UM 385, PGC 7551, IRAS 01572+0009, RBS 0264, RX J0159.8+0023, NVSS J015950+002338

Markarian 1014 known as PG 0157+001 is a quasar located in the constellation Cetus. It is located at a distance of 2.47 billion light years from Earth and is classified as a Seyfert galaxy as well as an ultraluminous infrared galaxy (ULIRG). With a diameter of more than 770,000 light-years across, it is one of the largest galaxies known.

== Characteristics ==
Markarian 1014 is an active nucleus-dominated galaxy with a total far-infrared luminosity of 9.93 × 10^{11} erg s^{−1} cm^{−2}. Apart from being radio-quiet, it contains optical emission lines considered broad, measured with a full-width half maximum of Hβ > 4000 km s^{−1}. In additional to optical emission lines, Markarian 1014 shows emission features of Lyα, N v and O vi, as well as polycyclic aromatic hydrocarbon.

Markarian 1014 is also one of the brightest quasars classified as a warm ULIRG. It is currently in a transitional phase from a typical ULIRG to an ultraviolet-excessive quasar. It has an X-ray emission measured at 2-10 KeV luminosity of 10^{43.80} erg s^{−1} when exhibiting a molecular outflow. The mass of the black hole in the center of Markarian 1014 is estimated 2.5^{+0.6}_{-0.6} × 10^{8} M_{Θ} based on an M_{BH} measurement carried out by the Seoul National University AGN Monitoring Project.

According to imaging and spectra of its host galaxy, Markarian 1014 is described as spiral-like, but also has a budge + disk morphology. It has a curved tidal tail found extending 60 kiloparsecs towards the north-east, suggesting it has gone through a major merger with a disk galaxy. The tidal tail is known to show lengthy low surface brightness extension with another secondary tail shown faint but rotating symmetrically.

Furthermore, the galaxy has twisted spiral isotopes within the 4 kiloparsec central radius hinting its spiral disk is undergoing a starburst or tidal debris caused by the merger. There is also the presence of carbon monoxide (CO) emission in the galaxy. Based on the relationship between its brightness and hydrogen gas (H_{2}) surface density, the gas mass is estimated 4 × 10^{10} M_{Θ}.

A 8.4 -GHz VLA image shows Markarian 1014 has a triple structure along the east–west direction. On both sides of its central core, two lobes are found with 1.1 arcsec from each other. There is also another component found faint and located at the optical nucleus position. According to the spectral index of the component, it is -1.11 ± 0.02 between 5 and 45 GHz.

== Stellar population ==
A B' - R' color map is presented for Markarian 1014. According to spectroscopy made on its regions with a steeper blue continuum spectrum, it has a young stellar population of stars aged between 180 and 290 million years old. These stars are mainly found inside a clump at the eastern region and along the north edge of its tidal tail, and both southwest and east from its nucleus. The galaxy also has other regions that are seen as redder in a B' - R' color map. This suggests much older stars aged approximately 1 billion years old but with little contribution from the old underlying population.
