= 3C 249.1 =

Galaxy in the constellation Draco

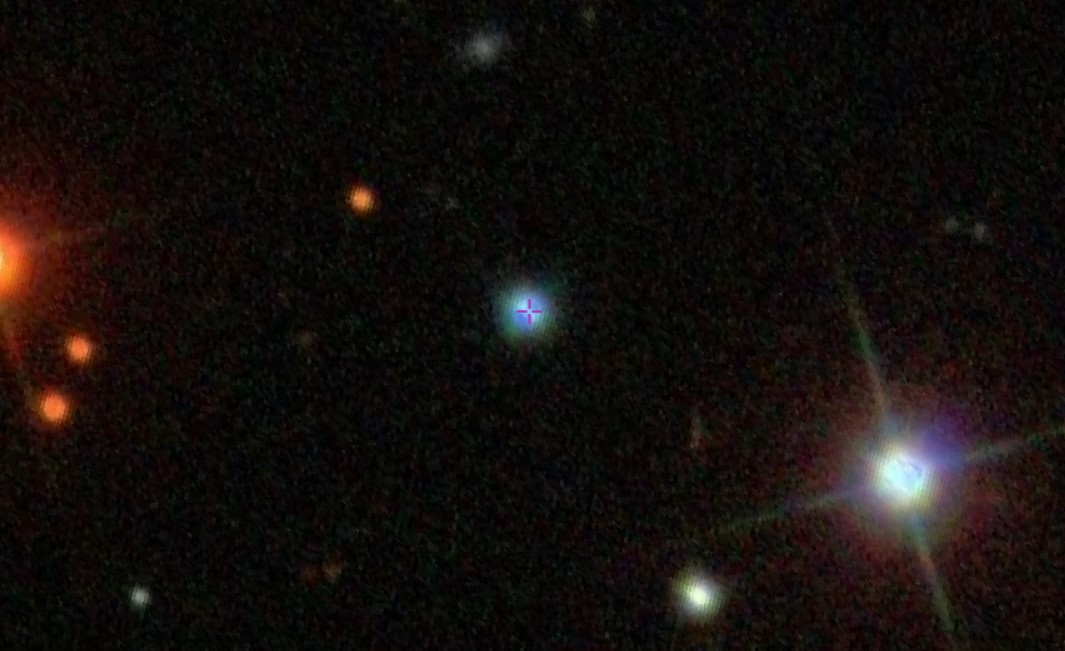
- SDSS image of 3C 249.1

Observation data (Epoch J2000)
- Constellation: Draco
- Right ascension: 11^{h} 04^{m} 13.8777^{s}
- Declination: +76° 58′ 58.170″
- Redshift: 0.311500
- Distance: 1,194 megaparsecs (3.89×10^{9} ly) h^{−1}_{0.73}
- Type: Sy1, Rad, QSO, X, IR, G, BH?, AG?, UV, gam QSO
- Apparent magnitude (V): 15.72

Other designations
- LEDA 2821945, 4C 77.09, QSO B1100+773, PG 1100+772

3C 249.1 is a Seyfert galaxy located in the constellation Draco. It hosts a powerful radio source and is located at redshift 0.3115, with a peculiar radio structure. One of its radio lobes is classified as having a Fanaroff-Riley classification Type II, while the other lobe has no features nor containing hotspots.

3C 249.1 contains emission lines with an extended emission-line region. Its black hole is known to have a high accretion rate.

The star formation rate in 3C 249.1 is estimated to be between ranges of ~1–250 M⊙ yr^{−1}, according to researchers using spectral energy distributions, as well as high resolution mid-infrared spectra of quasars from the Palomar–Green sample.

== Gallery ==
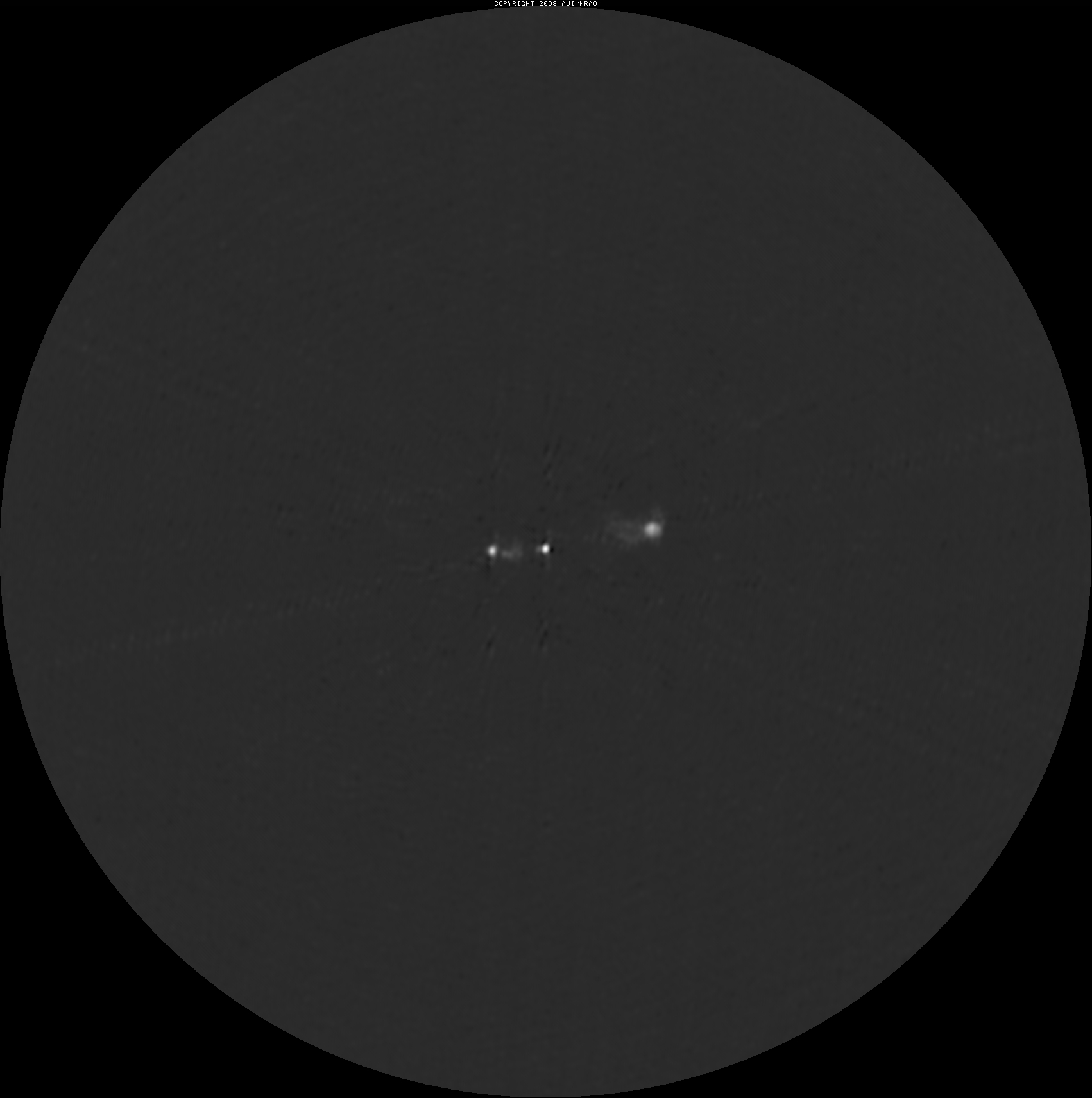
3C 249.1 observed in radiowaves
