= MR 2251−178 =

Nearby quasar with a large ionized nebula

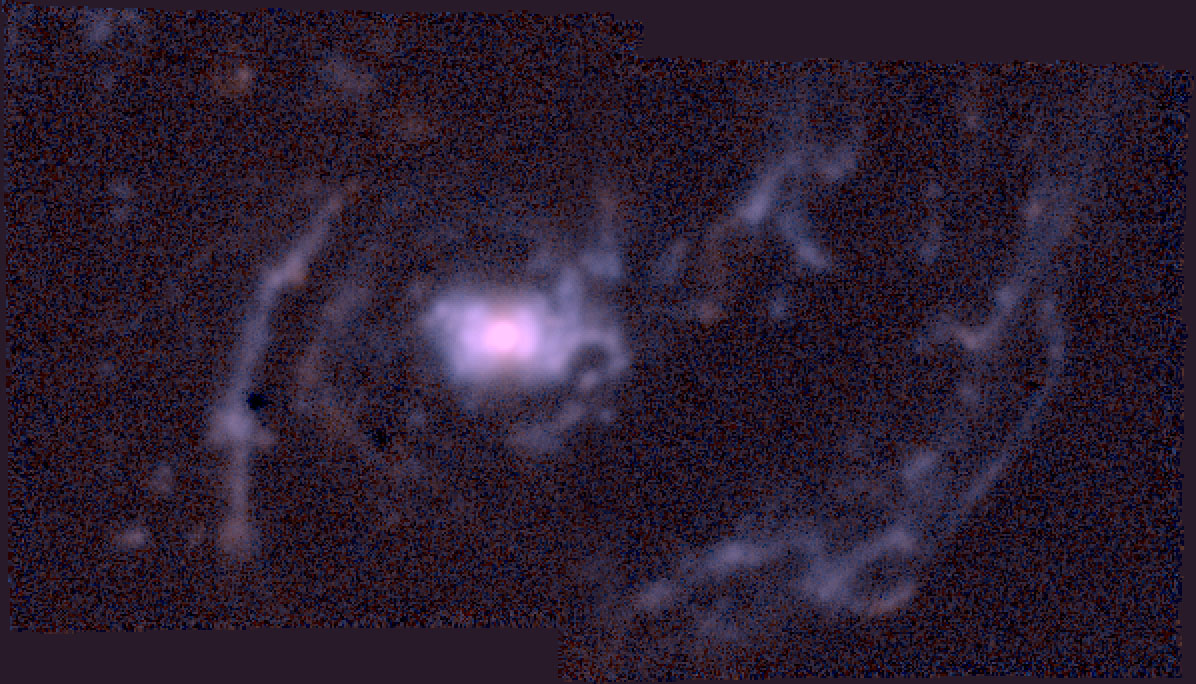
- Image with ESO's VLT MUSE, showing doubly ionized oxygen in blue

Observation data (Epoch )
- Constellation: Aquarius
- Right ascension: 22^{h} 51^{m} 12.2^{s}
- Declination: −17° 51′ 49″
- Redshift: 0.064 z
- Notable features: Largest emission line nebula surrounding it

MR 2251−178 is a relatively nearby radio-quiet quasar located at a distance of z=0.064 in the constellation Aquarius. It has the record of having the largest ionized nebula surrounding it with it having the mass of 6 million solar masses. A spiral complex that extends for over 200 kiloparsecs also surrounds the quasar.

The quasar is a small but gas-rich spiral galaxy that has much of its gas ionized from a recent galactic merger event with a nearby galaxy called G1. It is located on the outskirts of an irregular cluster of galaxies. This cluster has approximately 50 galaxies within it.

== Nebula ==
MR 2251−178 has the largest nebula surrounding it out of any known quasar discovered. The bulk of it is composed of hydrogen. The nebula is ionized but a large fraction of the nebula is very faint and diffuse. The smooth rotation of the nebula eliminates a cooling flow of gas as the origin of this nebula. Instead it likely originated from a past merger event with a nearby galaxy named G1.

== Merger event ==
The galaxy had experienced a recent galactic merger with the galaxy G1. It is located nearby and the result of the merger that left it tidally stripped of gas. It also lead to the creation of the ionized nebula surrounding MR 2251−178.
