= NGC 3758 =

Galaxy in the constellation Leo

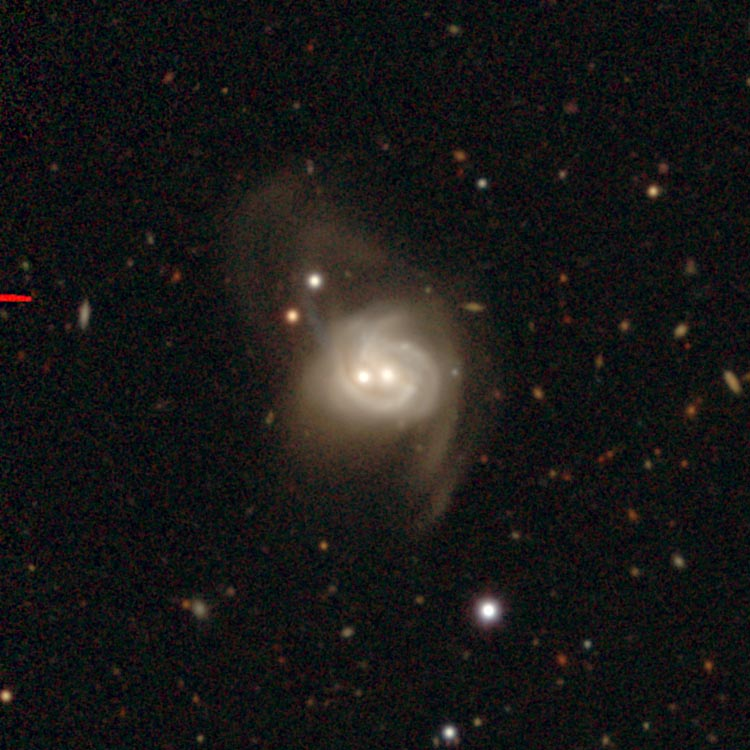
- DECam image of NGC 3758

Observation data (J2000 epoch)
- Constellation: Leo
- Right ascension: 11^{h} 6^{m} 29.10^{s}
- Declination: 21° 35′ 46.0″
- Redshift: 0.029771
- Heliocentric radial velocity: 8,909 km/s
- Distance: 447 Mly (137 Mpc)
- Apparent magnitude (V): 14.3

Characteristics
- Type: Sab pec, Sy1
- Size: 70,000 ly
- Notable features: Rare example of binary active galactic nucleus, seyfert galaxy

Other designations
- PGC 35905, CGCG 126-110, KUG 1133+218, MCG +04-27-073, IRAS 11338+2152, REIZ 1338, PGC 165579, AKRAI J1136286+213546, RBS 1003, NVSS J113629+213549, SFRS 149, Mrk 739, 1RXS J113629.4+213552, LEDA 35905

NGC 3758 known as the Owl Galaxy, is a type Sb spiral galaxy in the constellation of Leo. It is located 447 million light-years from the Solar System and an approximate diameter of 70,000 light-years. NGC 3758 was discovered by Ralph Copeland on March 18, 1874, but also independently discovered by Edouard Stephan ten years later.

== Description ==
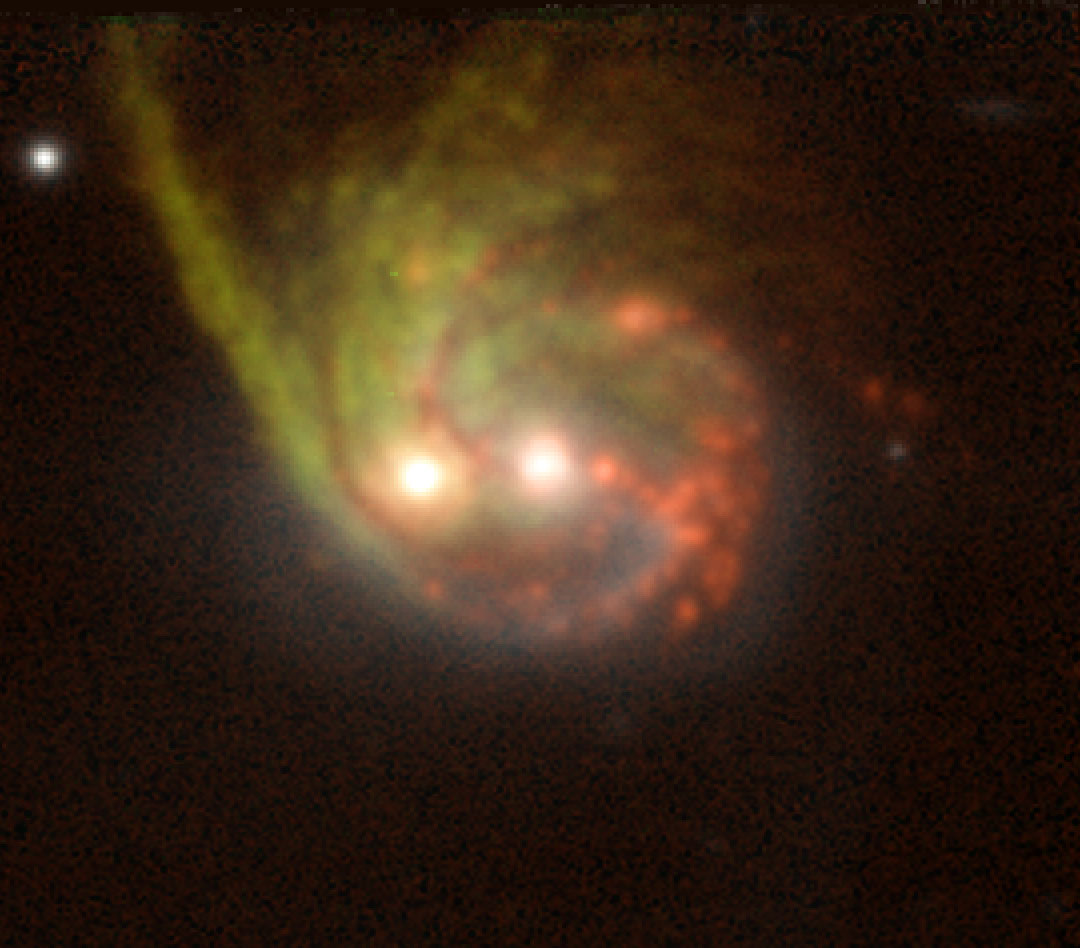
MUSE image of NGC 3758, showing [O III] as green (EELR) and H-alpha as red (star-forming regions)

NGC 3758 is classified as a Seyfert 1 type galaxy. It is classified a Markarian galaxy (designated Mrk 739), because compared to other galaxies its nucleus emits excessive amounts of ultraviolet rays. It is a binary active galactic nucleus galaxy, a rare example of a galaxy merger.

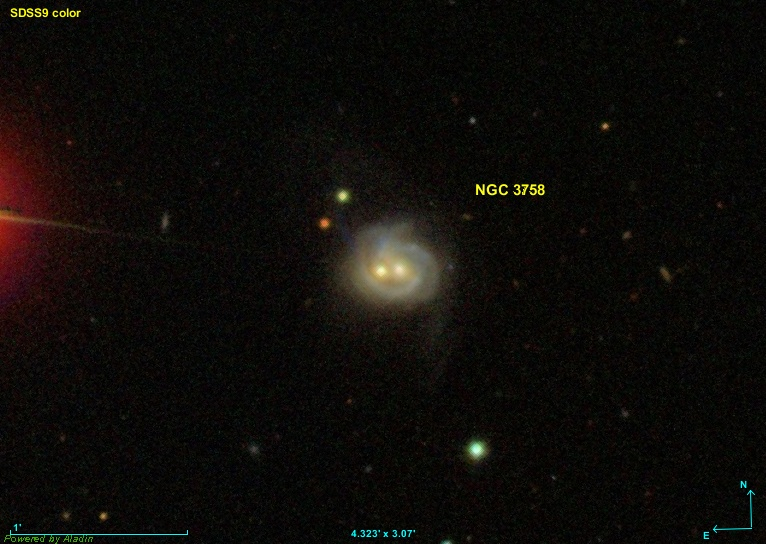
Sloan Digital Sky Survey image of NGC 3758. Notice the two luminous cores.

NGC 3758 is made up of two separate galaxies, NGC 3758W and NGC 3758E. Each of the two galaxies has a supermassive black hole, which is only 11,000 light-years apart and gorging on infalling gas. Both black holes are active, in which large amounts of gas is sent spiraling inward, which it becomes hot and radiates energy. The galaxies are gravitationally bound together and such, their orbits will dynamically decay until their nuclei merge in which the process takes a few billion years.

The galaxy has an appearance of a friendly-looking object complete with two cores as the eyes and a swirling grin. It is possible that binary black holes on the verge of merging in NGC 3758 can turn stars into hypervelocity stars and catapult them out of their host galaxy.

NGC 3758 contains an extended emission-line region (EELR), which was discovered in the Galaxy Zoo project. This EELR could originate from both AGN or from just one. Detailed oxygen [O III] imaging could reveal which AGN is responsible for this EELR. ESO's VLT MUSE instrument is capable of such observations and MUSE did observe NGC 3758 in 2016, but no publication about the MUSE data concerning the EELR exists as of May 2024.
