= 3C 196.1 =

Radio galaxy in the constellation Hydra

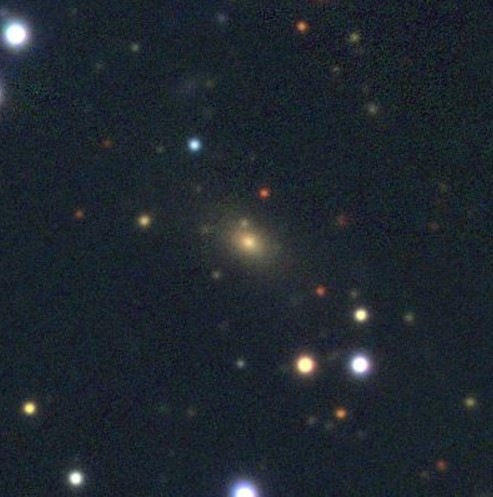
- Radio galaxy 3C 196.1.

Observation data (J2000.0 epoch)
- Constellation: Hydra
- Right ascension: 08^{h} 15^{m} 27.810^{s}
- Declination: −03° 08′ 26.61″
- Redshift: 0.198000
- Heliocentric radial velocity: 59,359 km/s
- Distance: 2.383 Gly
- Apparent magnitude (V): 16.94
- Apparent magnitude (B): 18.49

Characteristics
- Type: cD
- Notable features: Radio galaxy of HyMORS type, X-ray cavity

Other designations
- LEDA 1075766, DA 247, NVSS J081527-030826, PKS 0812-029, 3CR 196.1, 4C -02.35, NRAO 286, TXS 0812-029

3C 196.1 is a low-excitation radio galaxy located in the constellation of Hydra. It has a redshift of 0.198 and was first discovered as an astronomical radio source in 1965. This object resides as the brightest cluster galaxy (BCG) of a cool core galaxy cluster CIZA J0815.4-0308 located at the same redshift, with its source being best described as a HyMOR (Hybrid Morphology Radio Source).

== Description ==
The host galaxy of 3C 196.1 is a type-cD elliptical galaxy confirmed by near-infrared and optical imaging. It is described having an elongated structure from northeast and southwest direction with an estimated angular size of 3.16 kpc arcsec^{−1}. According to optical color gradients of the host galaxy, 3C 196.1 exhibits periodic shells with the centroids of the optical isotopes having a directional shift towards southwest, indicating a merger stage. Furthermore, nucleus of the galaxy is partly obscured by interstellar dust and appears to be split in several patches of emission that is extended along the nucleus' direction.

Radio imaging of 3C 196.1 made by Very Large Array, shows a compact one-sided source within the host galaxy and a secondary nucleus on its side opposite its radio extension, measuring a total size of 16 kpc and an orientation along a position angle of 40°. The southwest side of the galaxy has an enshrouded radio lobe with the region displaying high recessional velocities that is exceeding 500 km s^{−1} whereas the northwest side is more diffused with a small velocity dispersion.

According to X-ray and radio imaging analysis, 3C 196.1 has a butterfly-shaped X-ray cavity located 10 kpc from its nucleus with the inner and outer cavities having jet power of 1.9 × 10^{44} erg s^{−1} and 3.4 × 10^{44} erg s^{−1} respectively. The enthalpies of the inner and outer cavities are computed as 7 × 10^{58} erg and 3 × 10^{60} erg. Further evidence also shows presence of ionized gas filling up the cavity suggesting either the gas underwent numerous ionization events from AGN outbursts caused by the galaxy or the cooling of AGN outflows (10^{4} < T ≤ 10^{7} K) are causing the gas to form filaments.
