= 3C 459 =

Radio galaxy in the constellation Pisces

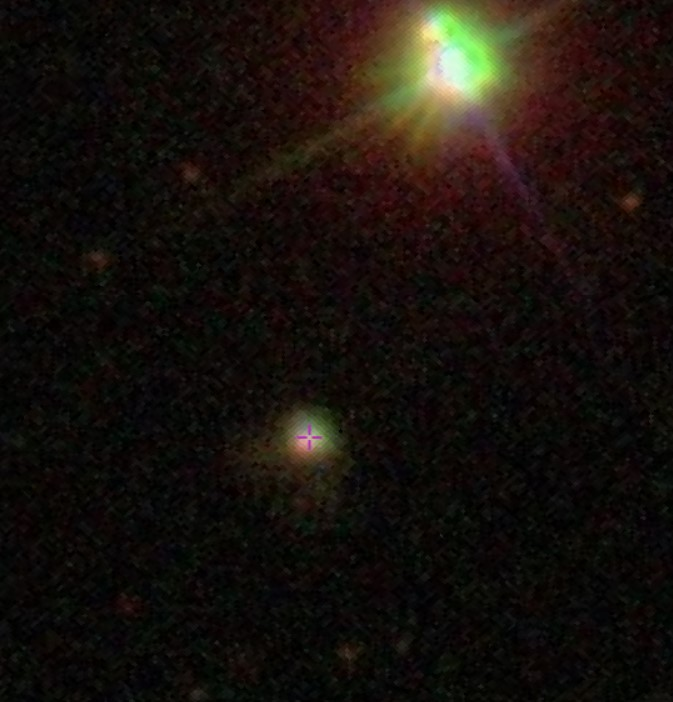
- The radio galaxy 3C 459.

Observation data (J2000.0 epoch)
- Constellation: Pisces
- Right ascension: 23^{h} 16^{m} 35.19^{s}
- Declination: +04° 05′ 18.29″
- Redshift: 0.220120
- Heliocentric radial velocity: 65,990 km/s
- Distance: 2.742 Gly (840.7 Mpc)
- Apparent magnitude (V): 16.68
- Apparent magnitude (B): 17.54

Characteristics
- Type: Sy2, N galaxy;BLRG, LINER
- Size: 8.73 kiloparsecs (28,500 light-years) (diameter; 0.5-1.2 keV Chandra)
- Notable features: Radio galaxy

Other designations
- PGC 70899, IRAS 23140+0348, 4C +03.57, PKS 2314+03, NRAO 0709, TXS 2314+038

3C 459 known as IRAS 23140+0348, is a radio galaxy located in the constellation Pisces. It is located 2.74 billion light years from Earth and is classified as a Seyfert 2 and LINER galaxy.

== Characteristics ==
3C 459 is categorized a Fanaroff-Riley class II radio galaxy. Its luminosity at both radio and far infrared wavelengths is L_{v}(4.8 GHz) = 10^{26.4} W Hz^{−1} and vL_{v}(60 μm) = 10^{12.2} L_{☉}. The host galaxy of 3C 459 is an elliptical galaxy with a disturbed outer morphology indicating a product of a galaxy merger. It also has a young stellar population.

3C 459 contains a triple radio structure, measuring a total extent of 29 kiloparsecs (kpc). It consists of a radio core and two radio lobes separated by 40 kpc. The radio core in 3C 459 has a compact steep radio spectrum with east and west extensions. As for the lobes on the other hand, the western lobe is equally 5.5 times further from the nucleus, while the eastern lobe is compact and more closer. It is also indicated to be significantly depolarized by interstellar medium since only the western lobe shows strong polarization.

According to follow-up observation by Chandra X-ray Observatory in 2014, 3C 459 shows X-ray emission properties. Although most X-ray emission originates from the radio core, a significant amount of it is found at larger angular separations from the core, surrounding the galaxy's lobes and radio jets.

There is also detections of diffused nuclear emissions and a filamentary ionized gas structure in 3C 459 creating a single-sided triangular-shaped region with an outward expansion of up to ~ 80 kpc. In its central emission line region, it is dominated by two compact knots of similar flux. Both of them are found to have an offset of ~ 400 km s-1 from velocity point of view suggesting a dual active galactic nuclei (AGN) system in 3C 459.
