= 3C 135 =

Radio galaxy in the constellation of Orion

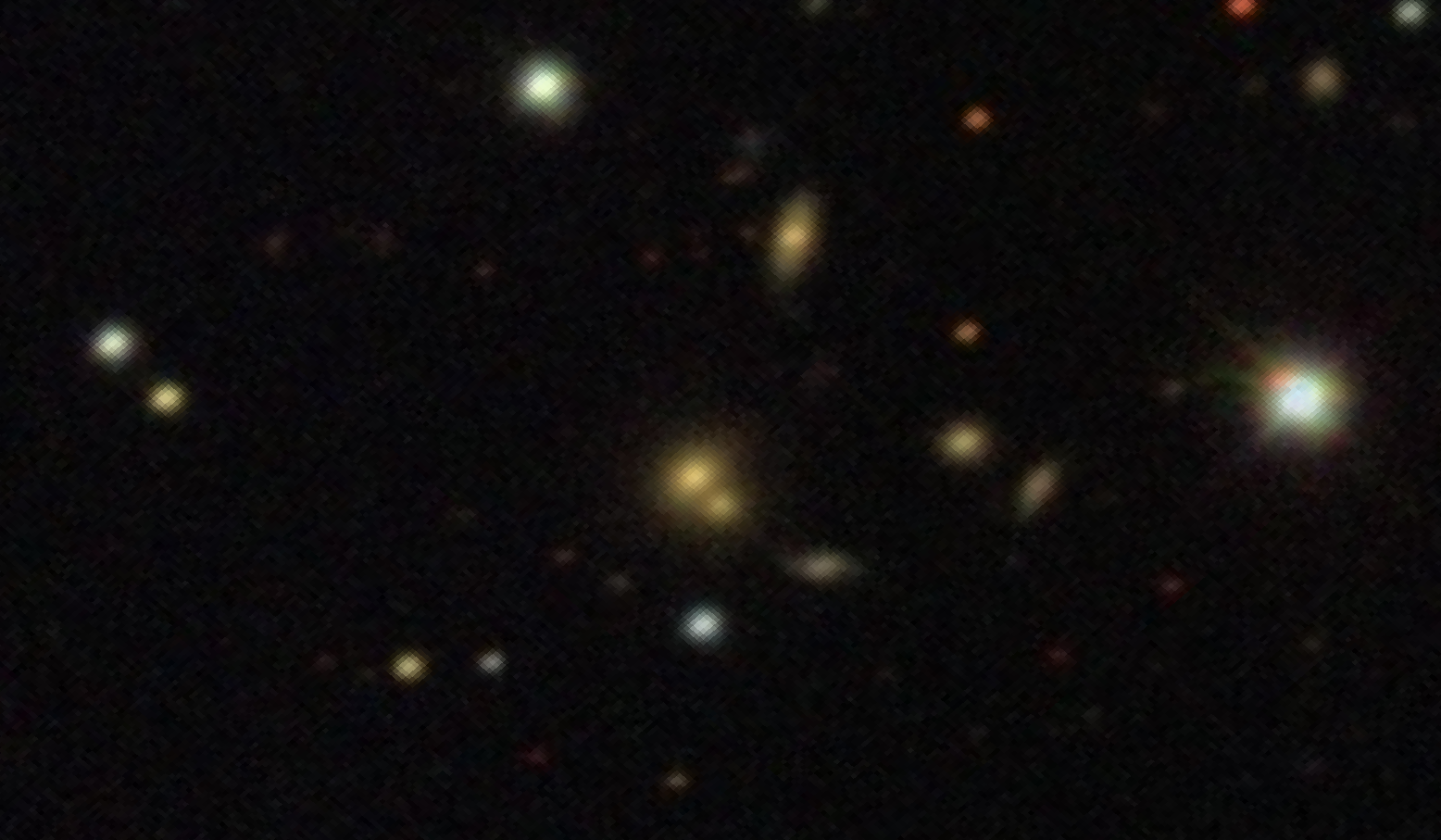
- SDSS image of the radio galaxy 3C 135

Observation data (J2000.0 epoch)
- Constellation: Orion
- Right ascension: 05^{h} 14^{m} 08.35^{s}
- Declination: +00° 56′ 32.25″
- Redshift: 0.127380
- Heliocentric radial velocity: 38,188 km/s
- Distance: 1.686 Gly
- Apparent magnitude (V): 17.00
- Apparent magnitude (B): 18.24

Characteristics
- Type: E; BLRG; Sy2 HEG
- Size: 46.09 kiloparsecs (150,300 light-years) (diameter; 2MASS K-band total isophote)

Other designations
- 4C 00.18, PKS 0511+00, PGC 16952, DA 165, NRAO 0201, TXS 0511+008, 2MASX J05140834+0056316, 87GB 051132.2+005313, OG +020

3C 135 is a Fanaroff-Riley class 2 radio galaxy and a Seyfert 2 galaxy located in the constellation of Orion. The redshift of the object is (z) 0.127 and it was first discovered as an astronomical radio source by A.S. Bennett conducting the Third Cambridge Catalogue of Radio Sources in 1962, before optically identified in 1966 with its counterpart.

== Description ==
3C 135 is a high excitation radio galaxy (HEG). The host is a large elliptical galaxy described as having a boxy morphology. There is a tiny surface brightness structure situated along its minor axis. The supermassive black hole mass of the galaxy is estimated as 8.09 ± 0.06 M_{☉} and the host mass is 11.24 ± 0.03 M_{☉}. It is located inside a rich galaxy cluster, with several other galaxies surrounding it. It is also a close pair with a small companion galaxy located southwest from it.

An emission-line region is present in the galaxy. Based on studies, the region is mainly aligning together with its radio source and is described elongating along the axis of its jet. There is a radio emission region found disconnected and towards the direction of the northwest hotspot. It is described as compact, displaying rapid rotations in its central regions and decreasing velocity gradients in its outer diffused structures. There are also emission-line knots present, forming a conical structure in a southwest direction with a distance of 77 kiloparsecs. There is also presence of extended outflows from the galaxy, forming two symmetrical lobes extending into northwest and southeast directions.

The radio structure of the galaxy is classified as compact. When imaged with the Very Large Array, it is found to have a low-surface brightness extension north from its southern radio lobe. The northern radio lobe on the other hand, is found to be split into two segments described as unequal, with a constriction separation in the lobe boundary. There is a small outer component of high brightness levels and a defined double hotspot structure with an elongated recessed primary hotspot. A faint one-sided jet can be seen entering the southern lobe, with evidence pointing out it is also interacting with interstellar medium gas. Observations also found evidence of strong emission-line features on the southwest side of the galaxy but receding features on its northwest side.
