= Atoms for Peace (disambiguation) =

Atoms for Peace was a speech by U.S. President Dwight D. Eisenhower

Atoms for Peace may also refer to:

- Atoms for Peace (band), a rock supergroup
- "Atoms for Peace", a song by Thom Yorke from the album The Eraser, 2006
- Atoms for Peace Award, an award 1955–1969 to encourage the peaceful use of nuclear technology
- NGC 7252, also known as the Atoms for Peace Galaxy
