= Ionization cone =

Astronomical phenomenon

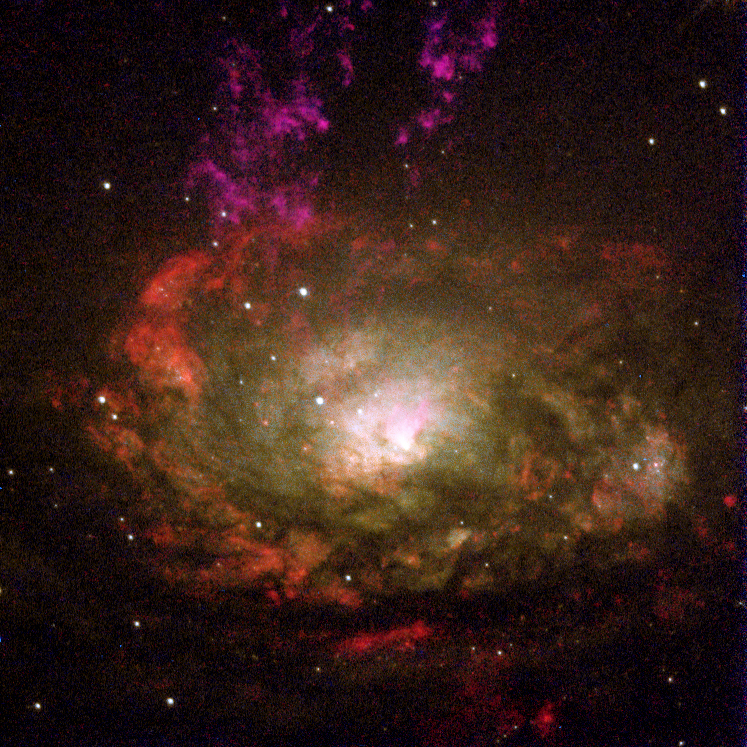
The Circinus Galaxy, a type II Seyfert galaxy in which an ionization cone has been observed.

Ionization cones are cones of ionized material extending from active galactic nuclei, predominantly observed in type II Seyfert galaxies. They are detected through their emission of electromagnetic radiation in the visible and infrared parts of the spectrum. The main method of observation is through spectroscopy, using spectral line analysis to measure the shape of the ionized region and the condition of the material such as temperature, density, composition, and degree of ionization.

== Characteristics ==
=== Shape ===
Ionization cones have a distinct conical shape, with the galactic center at the apex. Galaxies with ionization cones are thought to have a dense torus-like structure surrounding the central black hole, co-planar with the accretion disk. The material in this torus, consisting of interstellar gas and dust, obstructs the photons coming from the inner area around the black hole and prevents ionization of the galactic matter outside the torus. Along the symmetry axis, however, the density of interstellar matter is much lower, allowing for ionization. Radiation pressure then forces this matter away from the center, resulting in a cone of ionized material.

=== Orientation with respect to the galactic plane ===
There is no scientific consensus yet for the orientation of ionization cones with respect to the galactic plane (galactic disc), however, ionization cones usually align with radio sources near the galactic nucleus.

The two large ionization cones in the type II Seyfert galaxy NGC 5252 align with a radio source 10 kiloparsecs (approx. 32.6 kly) from the galactic nucleus instead of the nucleus itself. In NGC 5728, its 1.8 kiloparsec (approx. 5.9 kly) long ionization cone aligns within 3 degrees of a radio source near its nucleus. Conversely, in Messier 77, the ionization cone's alignment is thought to be influenced by factors such as central radio sources and the torus angle, yet it aligns closely with the radio emissions in the vicinity of the nucleus. The explanation for deviations from the galactic plane tends to focus on the complex interactions of the torus material with both the inflowing gas and dust in the accretion disk and the gas and radiation being pushed outward by the action of the central black hole. In the process of forming the shape of the ionization cone and containing its ionized material away from the interstellar medium, these interactions may lead to possible deviations from a co-planar alignment with the accretion disk and the galactic plane.

=== X-ray emission ===
Using soft X-ray spectroscopy performed with the Chandra X-ray Observatory, plasma in Markarian 3 photoionized from collision with the interstellar medium was observed to emit almost no X-rays. Markarian 3 is known to have a bi-conical ionization cone, indicating high ionization activity, yet the spectroscopy results indicate that ionization cones usually do not emit significant quantities of X-rays.

== Mechanics of formation ==
=== Ionization of matter ===
The accretion disk of the galactic black hole's radiation is aligned with the obscuring torus. Usually, ultraviolet or extreme ultraviolet radiation ionizes the nearby interstellar medium, enlarging the ionization cone. For example, Messier 77 has an ionization cone produced from the hypersonic collision of ejecta from its galactic nucleus with material in the interstellar medium of the galaxy. This collision produces extreme ultraviolet photons. These photons ionize the colliding material through photoionization.

=== Infrared emission and obscuring tori ===
Ionization cones tend to emit infrared light. Infrared emissions can be used to explain the properties of ionization cones. For example, tori that obscure the nuclei of Seyfert galaxies may have an effect on the photoionization by ultraviolet photons of the material found in an ionization cone. This can be determined with infrared emissions as the infrared emissions of ionization cones are not affected by the ionization of the matter in the cone. For example, the ionization cone in Messier 77 has the same symmetry in visible light and in infrared light, showing there is no impact of the torus on the ionization cone.

== Examples ==
In line with the prevalence of Seyfert galaxies, ionization cones are thought to be present only in a small fraction of galaxies.

The Circinus Galaxy, which is the closest Seyfert type II galaxy to the Milky Way, has been observed to have a large, prominent ionization cone. Messier 77's ionization cone was produced from the hypersonic collision of ejecta from its galactic nucleus with material in the interstellar medium of the galaxy. This collision produced extreme ultraviolet photons which then ionized the colliding material which is highly visible in an emission spectrum. The Seyfert galaxies Markarian 348 (type II) and Markarian 3 (disputed type II, possible type I) have very intense inverse bi-conical ionization cones.

=== In X-ray binaries ===
Although ionization cones have to date been observed mostly in Seyfert galaxies, they are not exclusive to active galactic nuclei. The X-ray binary LMC-X1 contains an ionization cone similar to those found in galactic nuclei. As X-ray binary systems have comparable X-ray power density to active galactic nuclei, they have the ability to generate similar ionization cones, although the scale of the regions differ by many orders of magnitude.

== Significance ==
The study of ionization cones has been used to support the existence of a Seyfert flare event that is thought to have occurred in the Milky Way several million years ago. Interstellar clouds at the Milky Way's galactic poles have been observed to be highly ionized, which could indicate a period of high activity in the Galactic Center that sent pockets of ionized gas outside of the Milky Way's central bulge.

== See also ==
- Active galactic nucleus
- Seyfert galaxy
