= PKS 2131−021 =

Quasar in the constellation Aquarius

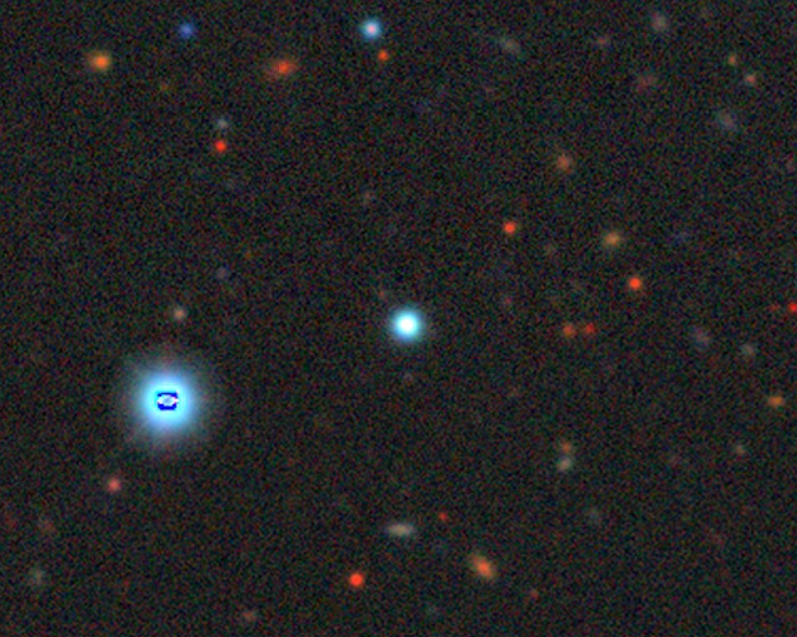
- PKS 2131−021 as seen with DESI Legacy Surveys

Observation data (J2000.0 epoch)
- Constellation: Aquarius
- Right ascension: 21^{h} 34^{m} 10.31^{s}
- Declination: −01° 53′ 17.2″
- Redshift: 1.285
- Heliocentric radial velocity: 385,233 km/s
- Apparent magnitude (V): 18.67

Characteristics
- Type: FRSQ;BLLAC, HPQ

Other designations
- 4C −02.81, MRC 2131−021, PGC 2818139, OX −053, IRCF J213410.3−015317, 2FGL J2133.8−0154

PKS 2131−021 is a quasar and a BL Lacerate object, producing an astrophysical jet. lt is located in the constellation Aquarius and classified as a blazar, a type of active galactic nucleus whose relativistic jet points in the direction towards Earth.

== Redshift estimation ==
The redshift of PKS 2131−021 is 1.285, estimating the quasar to be located about 8.5 billion light-years away. For more consistency according to researchers, they applied a cosmological parameters of H0 = 71 km s−1 Mpc−1, Ωm = 0.27, ΩΛ = 0.73. On this model, the comoving coordinate distance of PKS 2131−021 is 3.97 Gpc, with an angular diameter distance of 1.74 Gpc, and luminosity distance of 9.08 Gpc.

== Black hole observation ==
Observations of its radio emission spanning a 45-year duration show epochs of periodic brightness variations. These nearly sinusoidal brightness changes have been interpreted as evidence of orbital motion of a binary black hole. The orbital separation of the two black holes is inferred to be 200 to 2000 AU. The periodic variability in the light curve indicates that the pair orbit each other about every two years, at a distance so close that they will merge in about 10,000 years (as viewed from the Earth).

== See also ==
- Supermassive black hole
- NGC 7727
- OJ 287
