= Teacup Galaxy =

Low redshift quasar in the constellation Boötes

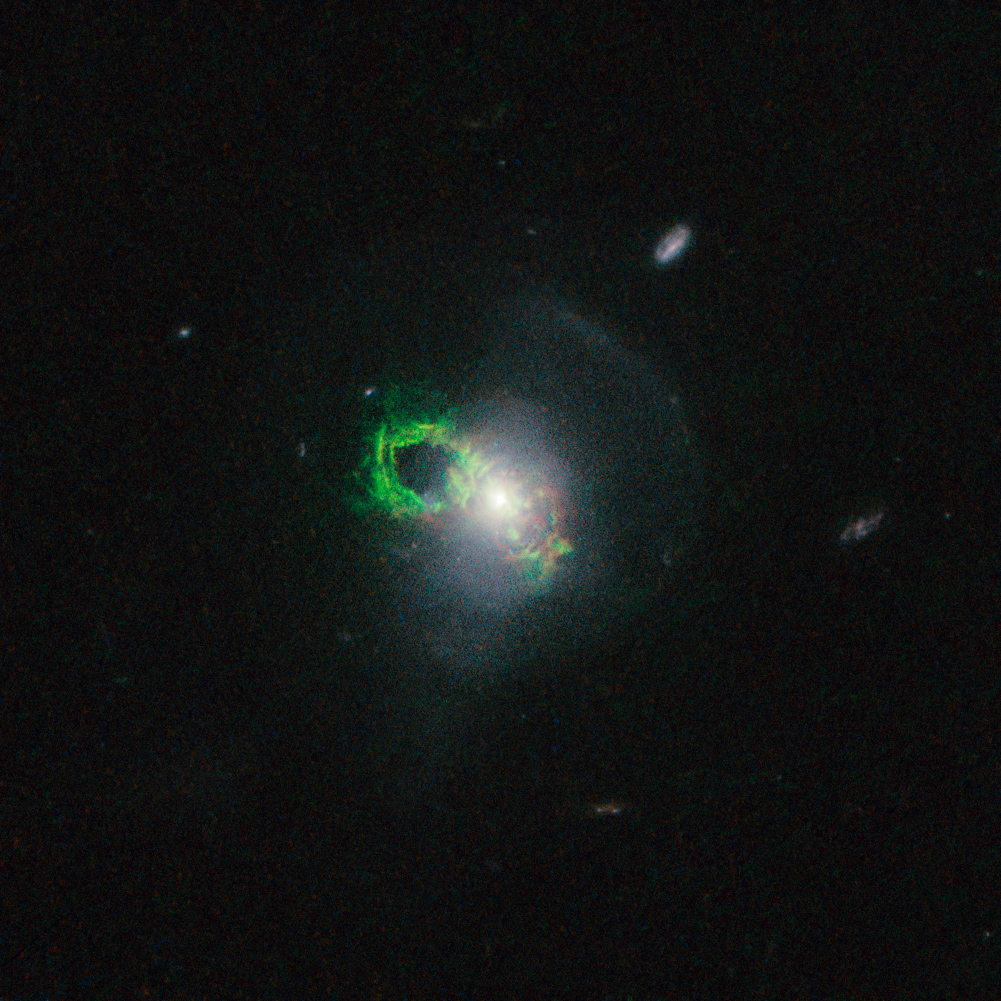
- The Teacup Galaxy as seen by the Hubble Space Telescope; Credit: NASA, ESA, W. Keel (University of Alabama), and the Galaxy Zoo Team

Observation data (J2000.0 epoch)
- Constellation: Boötes
- Right ascension: 14^{h} 30^{m} 29.868^{s}
- Declination: +13° 39′ 11.79″
- Redshift: 0.08513
- Distance: 1,100 Mly (337.26 Mpc)

Characteristics
- Apparent size (V): 0.223' × 0.197'

Other designations
- FIRST J143029.9+133912, IRAS F14281+1352, LEDA 1436754, NVSS J143030+133912, SDSS J1430+1339

The Teacup Galaxy, also known as the Teacup AGN, SDSS J1430+1339, or SDSS J143029.89+133912.0, is a low redshift type 2 quasar, showing an extended loop of ionized gas resembling a handle of a teacup, which was discovered by volunteers of the Galaxy Zoo project and labeled as a Voorwerpje.

== Galaxy ==
The Teacup Galaxy is dominated by a bulge and has an asymmetric structure with a shell-like structure and a tidal tail. The shell and tail are signatures of a recent merger of two galaxies. Dust lanes in the system are interpreted as a gas-rich merger. Several candidate star clusters were identified in this galaxy with Hubble Space Telescope images. Observations with the Gran Telescopio Canarias showed that the Teacup Galaxy has a giant reservoir of ionized gas extending up to 111 kpc. The optical/radio bubbles seem to be expanding across this intergalactic medium.

== Active galactic nucleus ==
Early studies of the Teacup AGN suggested that it is fading, although there was no clear evidence. Observations with VLT/SINFONI showed a blueshifted nuclear outflow with a velocity of 1600–1800 km/s. Observations in x-rays with Swift, XMM-Newton and Chandra revealed a powerful, highly obscured active galactic nucleus. This new result suggests that the AGN might not require fading. The quasar has dimmed by only a factor of 25 or less over the past 100,000 years.

== Bubbles ==
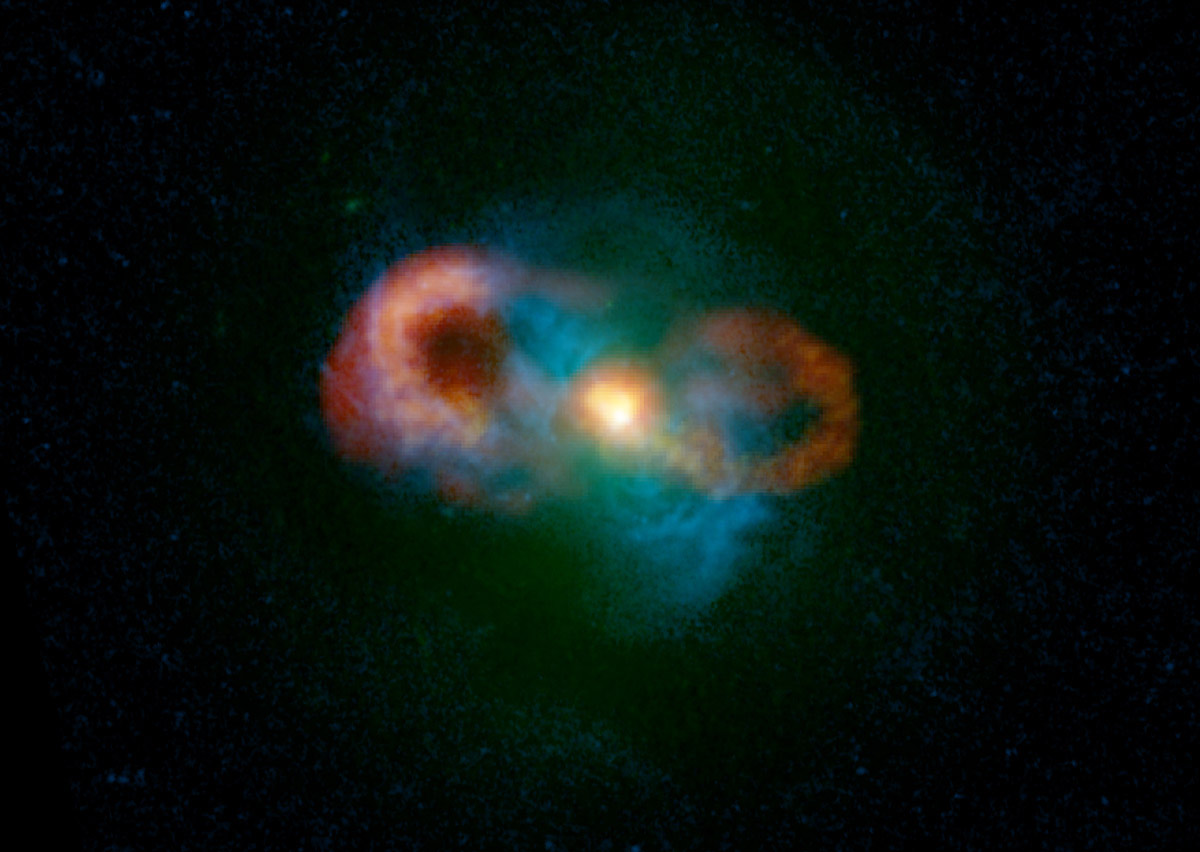
The Teacup Galaxy with images from Hubble (blue) and the Very Large Array (orange), showing both bubbles

One bubble was discovered by Galaxy Zoo volunteers in SDSS images as a 5 kpc loop of ionized gas. The loop is dominated by emission lines, such as hydrogen alpha and doubly ionized oxygen, which gives the loop seen in SDSS images a purple color. The emission of [O II] is extremely strong in the Teacup AGN and the quasar 3C 48 shows a similar [O II]/Hβ ratio.

Follow-up observations with the Very Large Array showed two 10–12 kpc bubbles, one "eastern bubble", consistent with the loop in optical observations and a "western bubble", only visible in radio wavelengths. The study also found a bright emission towards the north-east of the AGN, which is consistent with high-velocity ionized gas (−740 km/s). The bubbles are either created by small-scale radio jets or by quasar winds. Observations with Chandra revealed a loop in x-ray emission, consistent with the "eastern bubble". The Chandra data also show evidence for hotter gas within the bubble, which may imply that a wind of material is blowing away from the black hole. Such a wind, which was driven by radiation from the quasar, may have created the bubbles found in the Teacup.

The bubbles were observed with VLT/MUSE, showing that the jet strongly perturbs the host interstellar medium (ISM). At the edge of the bubble the researchers find a ≤100–150 Myr young population of stars, which indicates triggered star formation. This so-called positive feedback is predicted. Observations with ALMA found that the radio jet is compressing and accelerating molecular gas. This drives a lateral outflow, perpendicular to the radio jet. This is based on observations of carbon monoxide (CO) gas.

== See also ==
- Extended emission-line region
- IC 2497
- Hanny's Voorwerp
- Galaxy Zoo
- Zooniverse
- List of quasars
