= IRAS 20181−2244 =

Narrow-line Seyfert galaxy in the constellation Capricornus

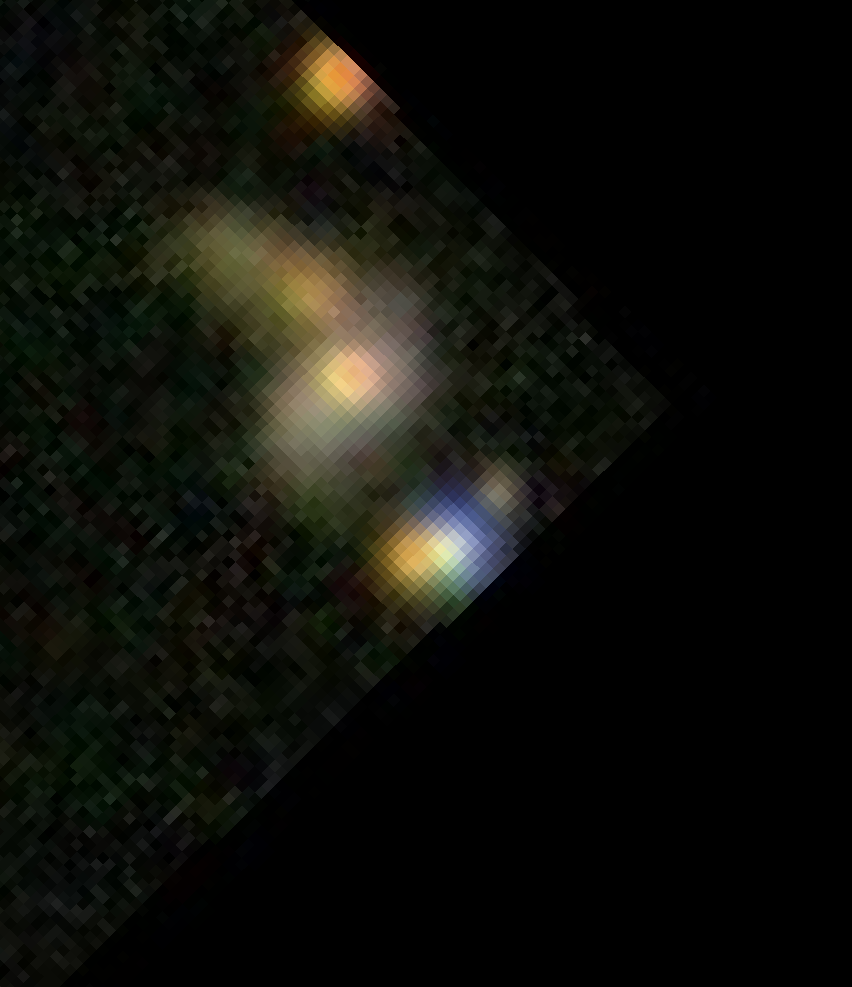
- SDSS image of IRAS 20181−2244

Observation data (J2000.0 epoch)
- Constellation: Capricornus
- Right ascension: 20^{h} 21^{m} 04.35^{s}
- Declination: −22° 35′ 18.69″
- Redshift: 0.184891
- Heliocentric radial velocity: 55,429 ± 45 km/s
- Distance: 2,655.3 ± 185.9 Mly (814.11 ± 57.00 Mpc)
- magnitude (K): 13.23

Characteristics
- Type: Sy1 Sy2
- Size: ~340,600 ly (104.42 kpc) (estimated)

Other designations
- 1AXG J202106−2235, 2MASX J20210438−2235183, 6dF J2021044−223518, [MHH96] J202103−223434, NVSS J202104−223520

IRAS 20181−2244 is a narrow-line Seyfert galaxy in the constellation of Capricornus. The redshift of the galaxy is (z) 0.184 and it was first discovered by astronomers in 1994, who found the object has a V-band magnitude of 16.8 and absolute magnitude of -23.6 thus making it the brightest known narrow-line quasar.

== Description ==
IRAS 20181−2244 is a radio-loud narrow-line Seyfert galaxy. Originally a Type 2 quasar, a study had recategorized it as a Seyfert 1 galaxy or a I Zw 1 object based on its optical spectrum, mainly characterized by signatures of weak forbidden lines, strong permitted ferrous ion lines and narrow permitted lines. The spectrum of the galaxy also displays blueshifted doubly ionized oxygen and neon ionization lines with velocities as much as 150 kilometers per seconds.

A study based on both imaging polarimetry and spectropolarimetry measurements showed the galaxy's polarization levels are mainly at around 2.3 ± 0.09%. Evidence also found the polarization levels are also much higher compared to stars on the sky plane, but however it drops to almost zero at the location of singly ionized nitrogen and doubly ionized oxygen forbidden lines.

The host galaxy of IRAS 20181−2244 has been debated as either a disk galaxy or an elliptical galaxy, although the former seems more likely. It is also at the boundary between flat spectrum or steep spectrum of narrow-line Seyfert galaxies with the measured spectral index of 0.50 ± 0.07 at 1.4 GHz frequencies. The supermassive black hole located in the center, is between the ranges of 3 × 10^{6} M_{☉} and 3.75 × 10^{7} M_{☉}. A companion late-type galaxy is located near to the host with a position angle of 26° and depicted having a reddened nucleus. There is evidence that the companion is also interacting with the host galaxy.

The total star formation of the galaxy derived from its 22 micrometer luminosity is found to be 2.48 M_{☉} per year, although a study in 2019 has suggested the star formation is surprisingly high, reaching around 300 M_{☉} per year. A peak radio flux density has been calculated and estimated as 24.9 W Hz^{−1} at 1.4 GHz.
