= NGC 7723 =

Galaxy in the constellation Aquarius

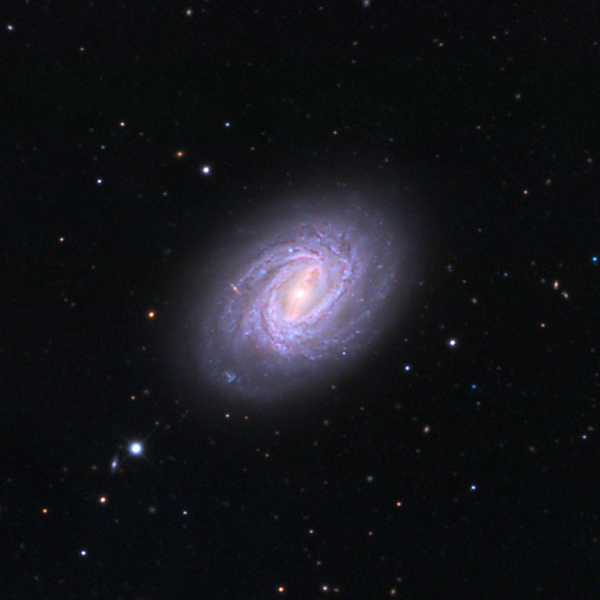
- NGC 7723 by Adam Block/Mount Lemmon SkyCenter

Observation data (J2000 epoch)
- Constellation: Aquarius
- Right ascension: 23^{h} 38^{m} 57.1^{s}
- Declination: −12° 57′ 40″
- Redshift: 0.006254 ± 0.000027
- Heliocentric radial velocity: 1875 ± 8 km/s
- Distance: 91.5 ± 10.6 Mly (28.1 ± 3.3 Mpc)
- Apparent magnitude (V): 11.2

Characteristics
- Type: SB(r)b
- Size: 29.36 kpc (95,720 ly) (diameter; 25.0 mag/arcsec^{2} B-band isophote)
- Apparent size (V): 3.5′ × 2.3′

Other designations
- MCG -02-60-005, PGC 72009

NGC 7723 is a barred spiral galaxy located in the constellation Aquarius. It is located at a distance of about 90 million light years from Earth, which, given its apparent dimensions, means that NGC 7723 is about 95,000 light years across. It was discovered by William Herschel on November 27, 1785. The galaxy is included in the Herschel 400 Catalogue. It lies 1.5 degrees north-northwest from Omega1 Aquarii. It can be seen with a 4-inch telescope under dark skies.

== Characteristics ==
NGC 7723 is a barred spiral galaxy. It has a bright nucleus and a boxy bulge. In the centre of the galaxy lies a supermassive black hole whose mass is estimated to be (10.6±4.9)×10^{6} M_{☉} based on the spiral arm pitch angle. The bar emerges from the opposite sides of the bulge. Straight dust lanes are observed along the bar, the one smooth and the other appearing broken. The bar has a maximum apparent length of 64 arcseconds. At the end of the bar the spiral arms form a pseudoring with diameter of 71 arcseconds. Based on observations in far ultraviolet (FUV) and Hα there is active star formation at the pseudoring. Based on the B-I color profile of the galaxy the bar finishes at 23 arcseconds, at the same distance where there is a population of older stars, and thus is suggested to be the corotation radius of NGC 7723.

The structure of the arms is complex. The arm that emanates from the southwest part of the bar is well defined for a quarter of a revolution and after that it becomes more diffuse and fades after reaching half a revolution. The other arm emanates from a feature about 60 degrees northwest of the bar and brightens after passing the end of the bar, and then it splits in two. The inner part forms the southwest part of the pseudoring and bifurcates after winding for about 120 degrees after the bar end, with the inner part being the brightest. The other arm becomes diffuse and of low surface brightness.

== Supernova ==
One supernova has been observed in NGC 7723: SN 1975N (Type Ia, mag. 15) was discovered by Paul Wild on 24 October 1975. It was also independently discovered by Valentin A. Lipovetsky on 27 October 1975.

== Nearby galaxies ==
NGC 7723 belongs to a small groups of galaxies known as the NGC 7727 group. Other members of the group include NGC 7727 and NGC 7724. NGC 7727 lies about 40' northwest of NGC 7723. It is also considered to be part of a galaxy group known as LGG 480, which consists of at least 5 members. Its members are NGC 7723, NGC 7724, NGC 7727, MCG 2-60-7 and MCG 2-60-10.
