= Light echo =

Astronomical phenomenon caused by light reflected off surfaces distant from the source

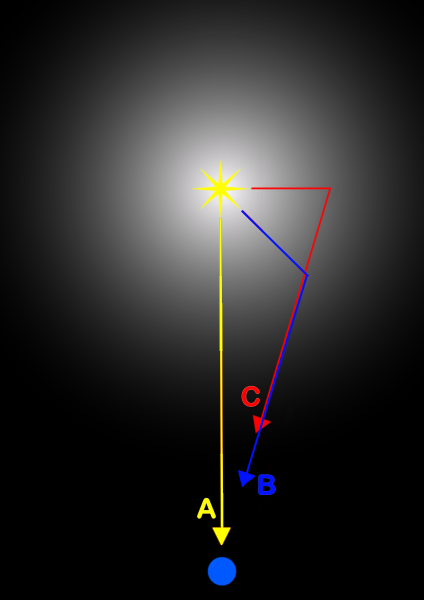
Reflected light following path B arrives shortly after the direct flash following path A but before light following path C. B and C have the same apparent distance from the star as seen from Earth.

A light echo is a physical phenomenon caused by light reflected off surfaces distant from the source, and arriving at the observer with a delay relative to this distance. The phenomenon is analogous to an echo of sound, but due to the much faster speed of light, it mostly manifests itself only over astronomical distances.

For example, a light echo is produced when a sudden flash from a nova is reflected off a cosmic dust cloud, and arrives at the viewer after a longer duration than it otherwise would have taken with a direct path. Because of their geometries, light echoes can produce the illusion of superluminal motion.

== Explanation ==
The distance traveled from one focus to another, via some point on the ellipse, is the same regardless of the point selected.

Direct light from a stellar outburst (white spot) reaches the observer (path 0) followed by light reflected off particles on progressively wider paraboloids (1–5): the observed disc apparently initially expands faster than light but the illusion is due to light reflecting off different unrelated particles (ANIMATION)

Light echoes are produced when the initial flash from a rapidly brightening object such as a nova is reflected off intervening interstellar dust which may or may not be in the immediate vicinity of the source of the light. Light from the initial flash arrives at the viewer first, while light reflected from dust or other objects between the source and the viewer begins to arrive shortly afterward. Because this light has only travelled forward as well as away from the star, it produces the illusion of an echo expanding faster than the speed of light.

In the first illustration above, light following path A is emitted from the original source and arrives at the observer first. Light which follows path B is reflected off a part of the gas cloud at a point between the source and the observer, and light following path C is reflected off a part of the gas cloud perpendicular to the direct path. Although light following paths B and C appear to come from the same point in the sky to the observer, B is actually significantly closer. As a result, the echo of the event in an evenly distributed (spherical) cloud for example will appear to the observer to expand at a rate approaching or faster than the speed of light, because the observer may assume the light from B is actually the light from C.

All reflected light rays that originate from the flash and arrive at Earth together will have traveled the same distance. When the rays of light are reflected, the possible paths between the source and Earth that arrive at the same time correspond to reflections on an ellipsoid, with the origin of the flash and Earth as its two foci (see animation to the right). This ellipsoid naturally expands over time.

== Examples ==
=== V838 Monocerotis ===
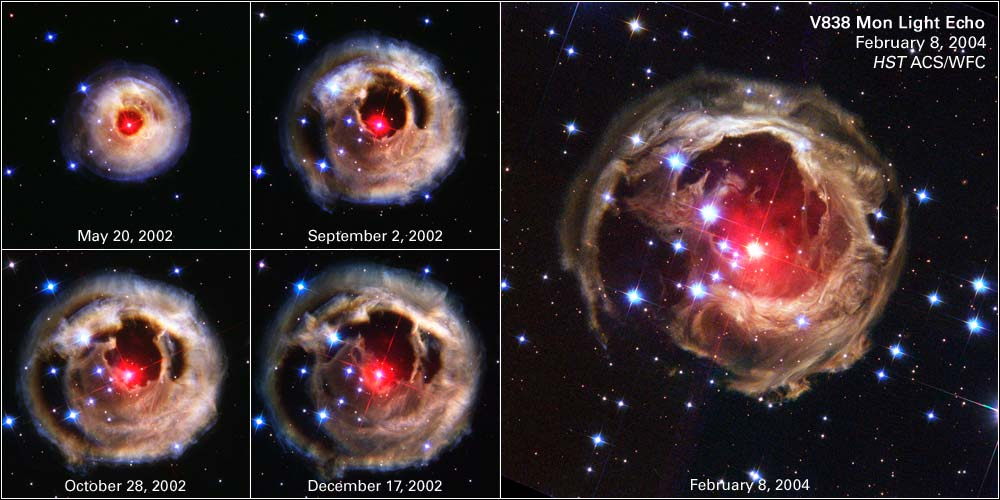
Images showing the expansion of the light echo of V838 Monocerotis. Credit: NASA/ESA.

The variable star V838 Monocerotis experienced a significant outburst in 2002 as observed by the Hubble Space Telescope. The outburst proved surprising to observers when the object appeared to expand at a rate far exceeding the speed of light as it grew from an apparent visual size of 4 to 7 light years in a matter of months.

=== Supernovae ===
Using light echoes, it is sometimes possible to see the faint reflections of historical supernovae. Astronomers calculate the ellipsoid which has Earth and a supernova remnant at its focal points to locate clouds of dust and gas at its boundary. Identification can be done using laborious comparisons of photos taken months or years apart, and spotting changes in the light rippling across the interstellar medium. By analyzing the spectra of reflected light, astronomers can discern chemical signatures of supernovae whose light reached Earth long before the invention of the telescope and compare the explosion with its remnants, which may be centuries or millennia old. The first recorded instance of such an echo was in 1936, but it was not studied in detail.

An example is supernova SN 1987A, the closest supernova in modern times. Its light echoes have aided in mapping the morphology of the immediate vicinity as well as in characterizing dust clouds lying further away but close to the line of sight from Earth.

Another example is the SN 1572 supernova observed on Earth in 1572, where in 2008, faint light-echoes were seen on dust in the northern part of the Milky Way.

Light echoes have also been used to study the supernova that produced the supernova remnant Cassiopeia A. The light from Cassiopeia A would have been visible on Earth around 1660, but went unnoticed, probably because dust obscured the direct view. Reflections from different directions allow astronomers to determine if a supernova was asymmetrical and shone more brightly in some directions than in others. The progenitor of Cassiopeia A has been suspected as being asymmetric, and looking at the light echoes of Cassiopeia A allowed for the first detection of supernova asymmetry in 2010.

Yet other examples are supernovae SN 1993J and SN 2014J.

Light echo from the 1838-1858 Great Eruption of Eta Carinae were used to study this supernova imposter. A study from 2012, which used light echo spectra from the Great Eruption, found that the eruption was colder compared to other supernova imposters.

=== Cepheids ===
Light echoes from RS Puppis propagate through its reflection nebula.

Light echoes were used to determine the distance to the Cepheid variable RS Puppis to an accuracy of 1%. Pierre Kervella at the European Southern Observatory described this measurement as so far "the most accurate distance to a Cepheid".

=== Nova Persei 1901 ===
In 1939, French astronomer Paul Couderc published a study entitled "Les Auréoles Lumineuses des Novae" (Luminous Haloes of the Novae). Within this study, Couderc published the derivation of echo locations and time delays in the paraboloid, rather than ellipsoid, approximation of infinite distance. However, in his 1961 study, Y.K. Gulak queried Couderc's theories: "It is shown that there is an essential error in the proof according to which Couderc assumed the possibility of expansion of the bright ring (nebula) around Nova Persei 1901 with a velocity exceeding that of light." He continues: "The comparison of the formulas obtained by the author, with the conclusions and formulas of Couderc, shows that the coincidence of the parallax calculated according to Coudrec's scheme, with parallaxes derived by other methods, could have been accidental."

=== ShaSS 622-073 system ===
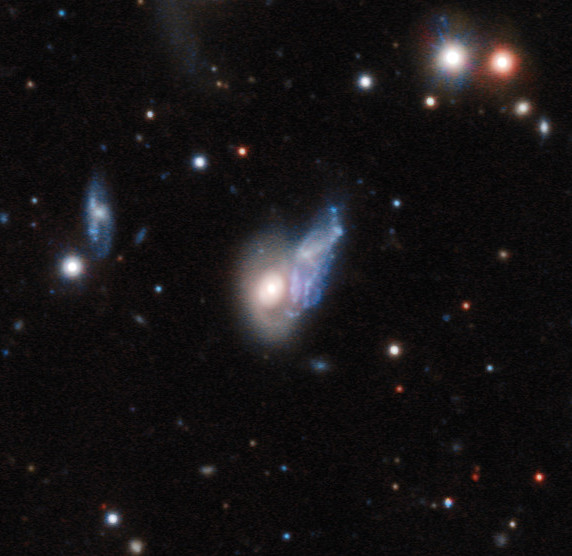
An echo of ShaSS 073 galaxy's light detected by ESO's VLT Survey Telescope.

The ShaSS 622-073 system is composed of the larger galaxy ShaSS 073 (seen in yellow in the image on the right) and the smaller galaxy ShaSS 622 (seen in blue) that are at the very beginning of a merger. The bright core of ShaSS 073 has excited with its radiation a region of gas within the disc of ShaSS 622; even though the core has faded over the last 30,000 years, the region still glows brightly as it re-emits the light.

== Quasar light and ionisation echoes ==
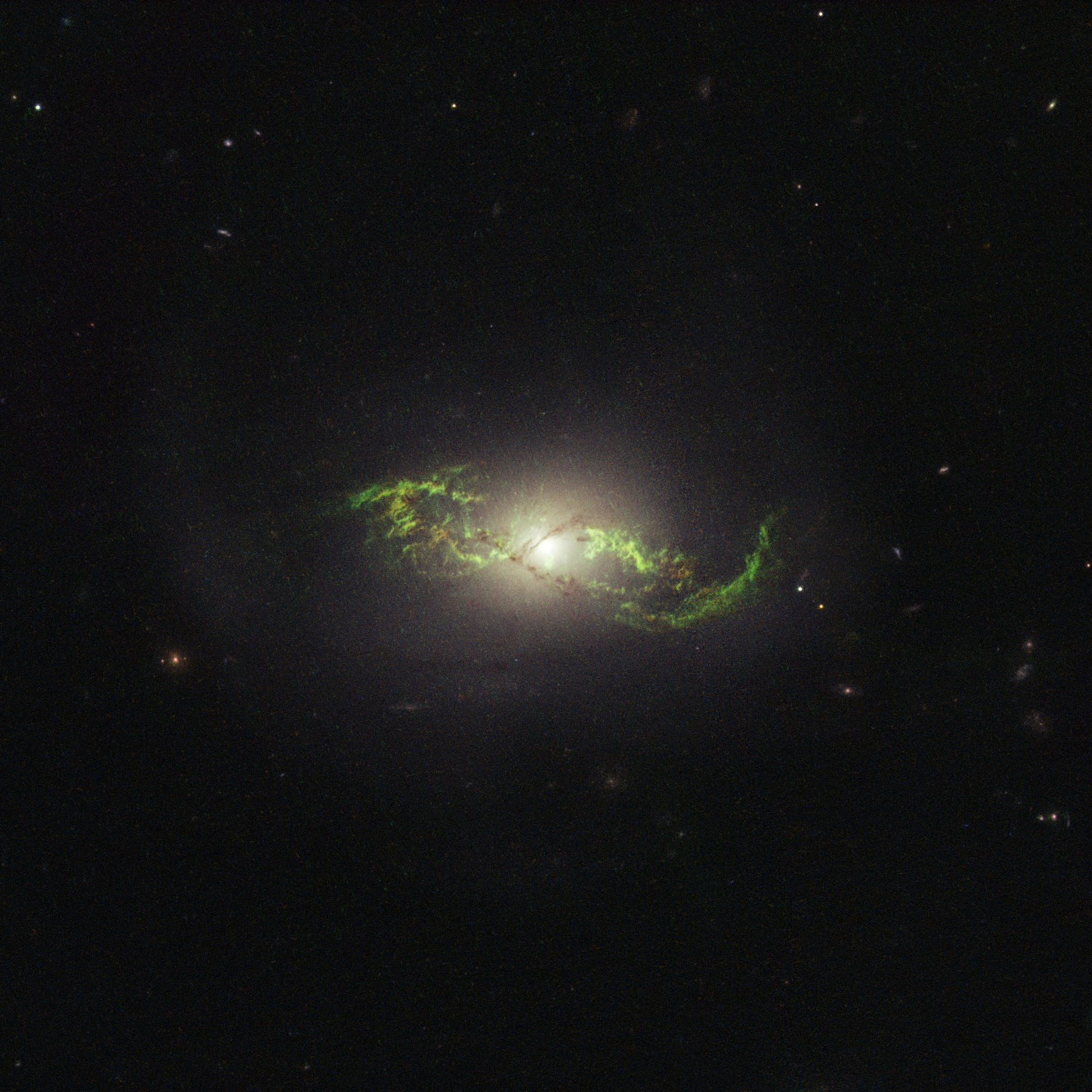
A Hubble Space Telescope image of NGC 5972, a quasar ionisation echo.

Since 2009 objects known either as quasar light echoes or quasar ionisation echoes have been investigated. A well studied example of a quasar light echo is the object known as Hanny's Voorwerp (HsV).

HsV is made entirely of gas so hot – about 10,000 degrees Celsius – that astronomers felt it had to be illuminated by something powerful. After several studies of light and ionisation echoes, it is thought they are likely caused by the 'echo' of a previously-active AGN that has shut down. Kevin Schawinski, a co-founder of the website Galaxy Zoo, stated: "We think that in the recent past the galaxy IC 2497 hosted an enormously bright quasar. Because of the vast scale of the galaxy and the Voorwerp, light from that past still lights up the nearby Voorwerp even though the quasar shut down sometime in the past 100,000 years, and the galaxy's black hole itself has gone quiet." Chris Lintott, also a co-founder of Galaxy Zoo, stated: "From the point of view of the Voorwerp, the galaxy looks as bright as it would have before the black hole turned off – it's this light echo that has been frozen in time for us to observe." The analysis of HsV in turn has led to the study of objects called Voorwerpjes and Green bean galaxies.

== Gallery ==
Light echo at Eta Carinae

Light echo at Cassiopeia A (north) played back and forth

Light echo at Cassiopeia (south) played back and forth

Detailed views of the Cassiopeia A light echo with JWST NIRCam

== See also ==
- Cherenkov radiation
- I Zwicky 1#Supermassive black hole, the first known example of light echo coming from the behind of a black hole.
