= Green bean galaxy =

Very rare astronomical objects that are thought to be quasar ionization echos

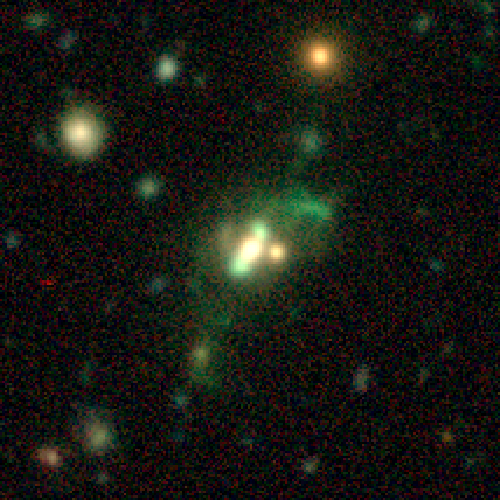
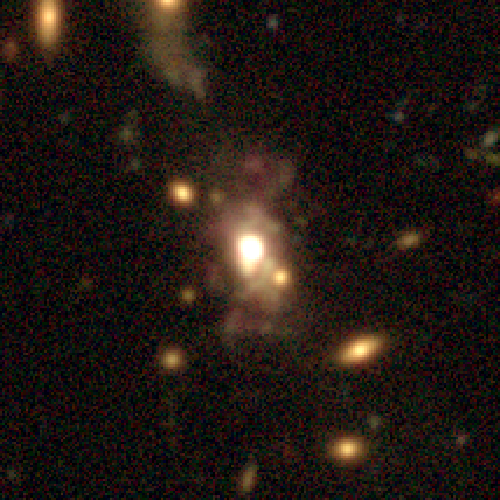
These two images show the green bean galaxies J0113+0106 (top) and J1155−0147 (bottom) as seen by the Hyper Suprime-Cam on the Subaru Telescope.

Green bean galaxies (GBGs) are very rare astronomical objects that are thought to be quasar ionization echos. They were discovered by Mischa Schirmer and colleagues R. Diaz, K. Holhjem, N.A. Levenson, and C. Winge. The authors report the discovery of a sample of Seyfert-2 galaxies with ultra-luminous galaxy-wide narrow-line regions (NLRs) at redshifts z=0.2–0.6.

While examining survey images taken with the 3.6-meter Canada–France–Hawaii Telescope (CFHT) atop 4200-m Mauna Kea, Hawaii, Schirmer noticed a galaxy with unusual colors—strongly peaking in the r filter, suggesting a spectral line. In fact, the color is quite similar to the Green Pea galaxies (GPs), which are compact star-forming galaxies. However, the object which became known as a GBG is much larger.

These galaxies are so rare that there is on average only one in a cube about 1.3 billion light-years across. They were nicknamed GBGs because of their color and because they are superficially similar to, but larger than, GPs. The interstellar gas in most GPs is ionized by UV-light from intense star formation, whereas the gas in GBGs is ionized by hard x-rays from an active galactic nucleus (AGN). The scarcity of GBGs indicates that this phenomenon is very rare, and/or very short-lived.

GBGs are likely related to the object known as Hanny's Voorwerp, another possible quasar ionization echo. GBGs are substantially different, though, as their luminosities, sizes and gas masses are 10–100 times higher than in other quasar ionisation clouds, for instance the 154 studied in Keel et al. 2012 (nicknamed 'voorwerpjes'). These 'voorwerpjes' are estimated to have bright phases that last between ~20,000 and 200,000 years.

Possible formation mechanisms are currently under investigation. Likely, the giant gas outflows have been produced during the last stages in the life of super-luminous quasars, which subsequently experienced a rapid shut-down, e.g. due to a process known as AGN feedback. The escaping X-rays from the former very active quasar state still ionize the gas, causing the ionization echo.

== Sloan Digital Sky Survey (SDSS) identifications ==
Green Bean Galaxies List (SDSS DR8 refs)
Number	SDSS id	Notes
001	1237679077517557845	GALEX All Sky Catalog (ASC) J002016.43-053127.1
002	1237676441460474246	GALEX ASC J002434.84+325842.5
003	1237666091128914338	GALEX ASC J011136.63+225357.5
004	1237666340800364769	8 previous references listed in NED.
005	1237680284389015833	GALEX ASC J015930.73+270303.4
006	1237650371555229774	2 previous references listed in NED, including CHANDRA 2010.
007	1237661386529374363	GALEX ASC J134709.11+545311.0
008	1237662236402647262	GALEX ASC J135155.51+081608.7
009	1237665442062663827	NVSS J144110+251702
010	1237655742407835791	1 previous reference in NED as part of a compact group (similar to HCGs).
011	1237662306730639531	GALEX ASC J150420.75+343958.6
012	1237667968032637115	NVSS J150517+194450
013	1237669699436675933	NVSS J205057+055014
014	1237680191506678389	NVSS J213542-031432
015	1237680306395415794	GALEX ASC J220216.57+230904.8
016	1237656538051248311	Prototype GBG J2240-0927, GALEX ASC J224024.09-092748.5
017	1237680503434445439	SDSS J230829.37+330310.4

== VLT/XSHOOTER spectrum of Green Bean Galaxy J2240-0927 ==
The spectrum of Green Bean Galaxy J2240

On the left is the spectrum of the astronomical object J224024.1-092748 (hereafter: J2240). It was acquired using the Very Large Telescope and XSHOOTER, a multi wavelength (300–2500 nm) medium resolution spectrograph. The J2240 spectrum shows 3 bandwidths: UVB (Ultraviolet B which are medium UV wavelengths of 315–280 nm), VIS (the visible spectrum) and NIR (Near Infrared, which have wavelengths of 0.75–1.4 μm).

In the spectrum of J2240, the black line represents the galaxy center, integrated to within ±4.5 kpc (kilo-parsec) of the nucleus, while the blue line has been integrated over 7.6 kpc, centered on the ionized cloud. Note the great similarity between the two spectra. For visualization purposes, data has been filtered with a 0.7 nm-wide median kernel. Thus the actual resolution is 48 (UVB/VIS) and 12 (NIR) times higher than shown for the UVB/VIS and (NIR) channels respectively.

== Unravelling the emission signature of a quasar ionization echo ==
A Green bean galaxy named J224024.1−092748 (abbreviation J2240)

In May 2015, a study was accepted for publication in MNRAS titled: "The "Green Bean" Galaxy SDSS J224024.1--092748: Unravelling the emission signature of a quasar ionization echo."

The abstract states: "'Green Bean' galaxies (GBs) are the most [O III]-luminous type-2 active galactic nuclei (AGN) at z ~ 0.3. However, their infrared luminosities reveal AGN in very low activity states, indicating that their gas reservoirs must be ionized by photons from a recent high activity episode – we are observing quasar ionization echoes." Further on: "Our analysis of J224024.1-092748 indicates that GBs provide a unique fossil record of the transformation from the most luminous quasars to weak AGN."

== AGN ionization echoes, thermal echoes, and ionization deficits ==
In July 2016, a study was accepted for publication in MNRAS titled: "About AGN ionization echoes, thermal echoes, and ionization deficits in low redshift Lyman-alpha blobs". GBGs are thought to be low redshift examples of 'Lyman alpha blobs' (LABs).

The abstract states: "We report the discovery of 14 Lyman-alpha blobs (LABs) at z~0.3, existing at least 4–7 billion years later in the Universe than all other LABs known." Further on: "Because of their proximity and high flux densities, GBs are perfect targets to study AGN feedback, mode switching and the Ly-alpha escape."

== See also ==
- Pea galaxy – Possible type of luminous blue compact galaxy
- Galactic orientation – Spatial orientation of a galactic plane
- Galaxy formation and evolution – Subfield of cosmology
