= NGC 7252 =

Peculiar galaxy in the constellation Aquarius

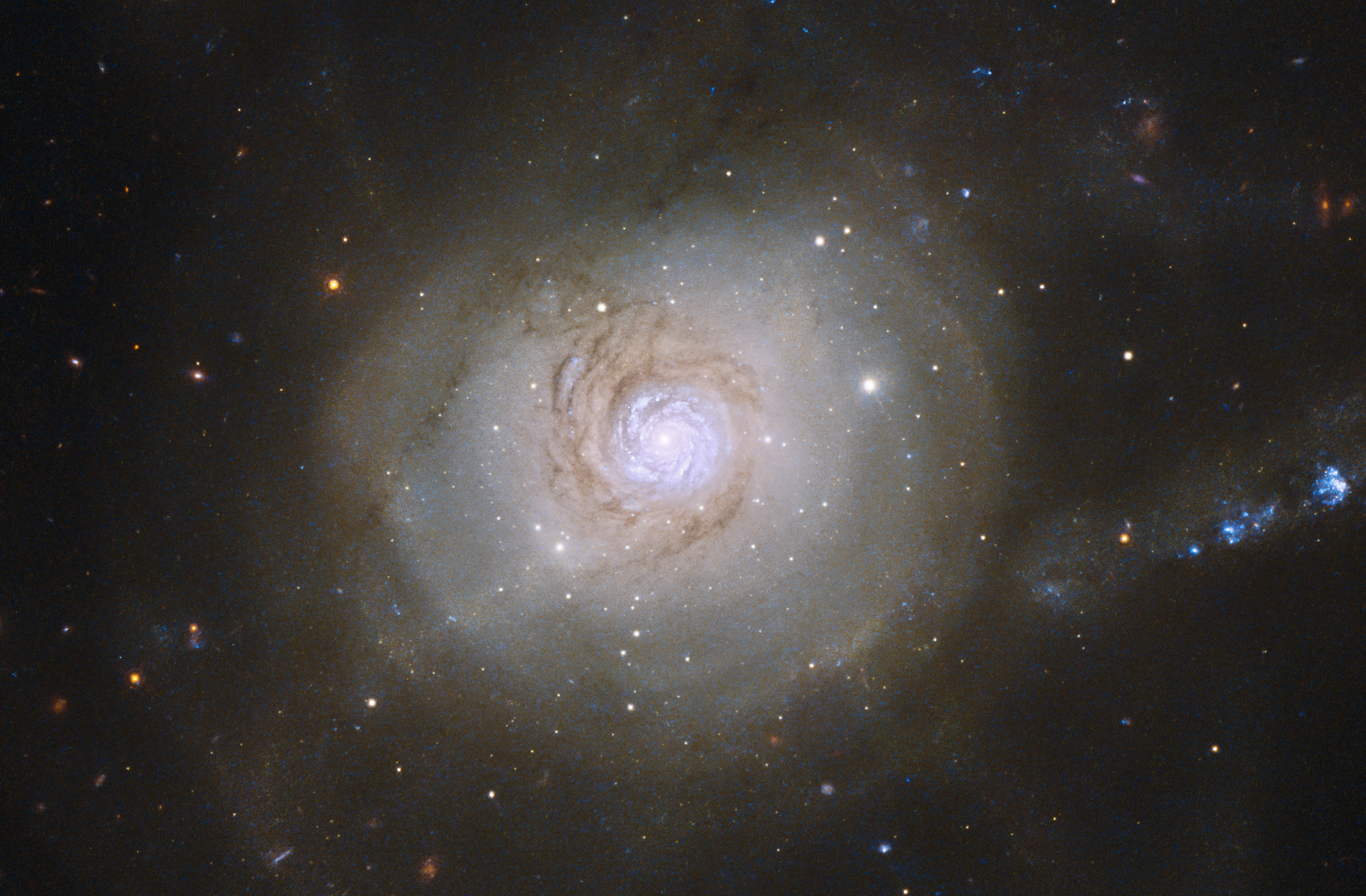
- Hubble Space Telescope (HST) image of NGC 7252

Observation data (J2000 epoch)
- Constellation: Aquarius
- Right ascension: 22^{h} 20^{m} 44.8^{s}
- Declination: −24° 40′ 42″
- Redshift: 4792 ± 1 km/s
- Distance: 220 million light years
- Apparent magnitude (V): 12.7

Characteristics
- Type: (R)SA(r)0
- Size: ~423,000 ly (129.7 kpc) (estimated)
- Apparent size (V): 1′.9 × 1′.6

Other designations
- PGC 68612, Arp 226, Atoms for Peace Galaxy

NGC 7252 is a peculiar galaxy resulting from an interaction between two galaxies that started a billion years ago. It is located 220 million light years away in the constellation Aquarius. It is also called Atoms for Peace Galaxy, a nickname which comes from its loop-like structure, made of stars, that resembles a classic diagram of an electron orbiting an atomic nucleus.

== Description ==
NGC 7252 is located in the southern part of Aquarius. With an apparent magnitude of 12.7, it is bright enough to be seen by amateur astronomers as a faint small fuzzy blob. Large loops of gas and stars around it makes the galaxy quite peculiar. Thus, it is also Arp 226 (the 226th entry in Arp's list of peculiar galaxies).

The galaxy is the result of a collision of two galaxies, which created the looping structures. This collision is an opportunity for astronomers to study such mergers and to predict the future of our Milky Way after its expected collision with the Andromeda Galaxy.

The galaxy's resemblance to a diagram of an atomic nucleus led to its nickname. Astronomer François Schweizer noted the galaxy "has variously been compared to the Atoms-for-Peace symbol, to a fuzzball with protruding filaments, and to a crumpled spider." This was a reference to the stylized atomic nucleus logo used by the "Atoms for Peace" program, based on a December 1953 speech by U.S. President Dwight D. Eisenhower. The speech was concerned about promoting nuclear power for peaceful purposes instead of nuclear weapons.

== Structure ==
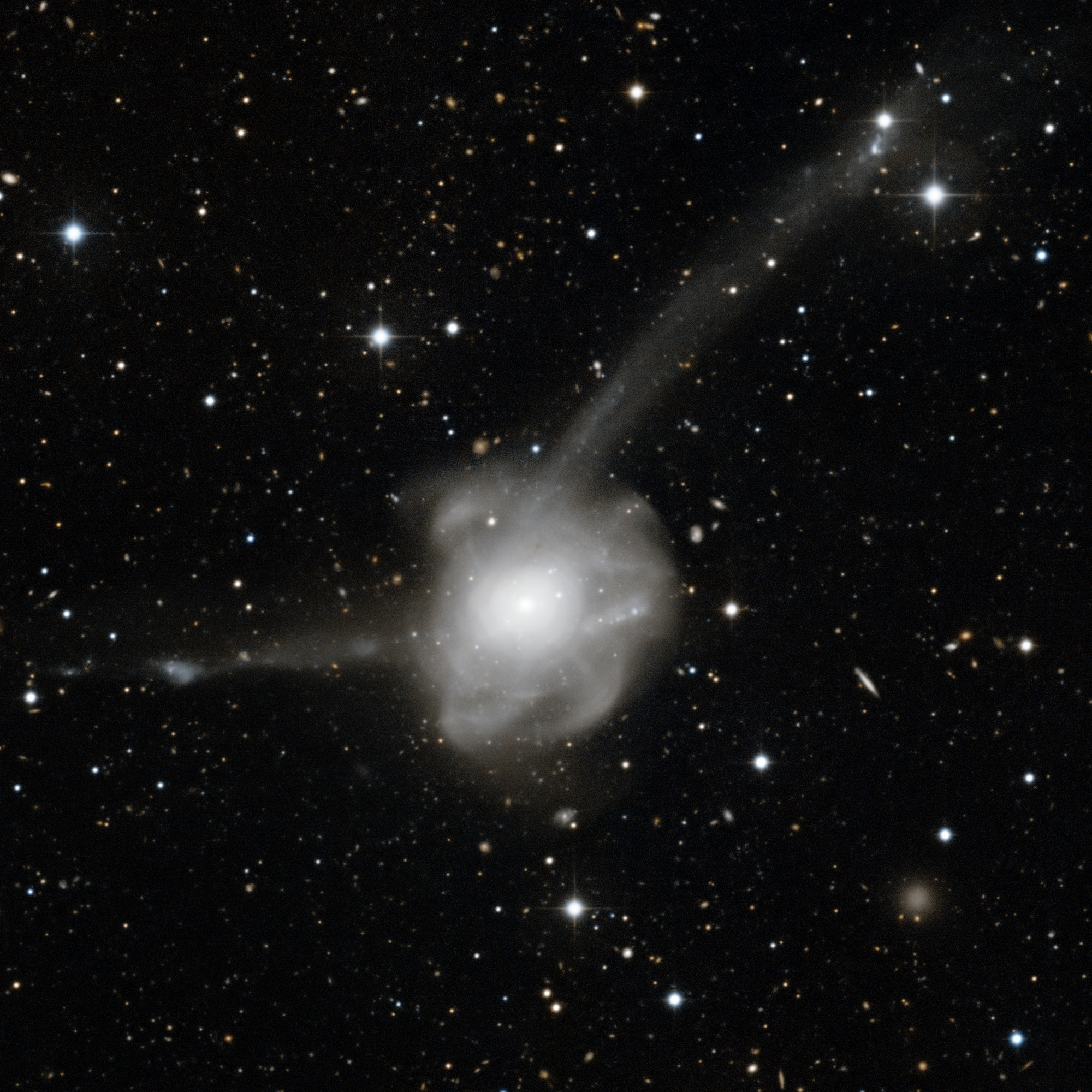
Long exposure by the MPG/ESO 2.2-metre telescope showing NGC 7252's extended unusual shape, the result of a collision of two galaxies.

NGC 7252 likely formed from the merger of two spiral galaxies that had their first close approach about 620 million years ago. They had a second encounter about 260 million years ago, and the nuclei of the two galaxies coalesced about 215 million years ago.

A pinwheel-shaped disk, rotating in a direction opposite to that of the galaxy, is found deep inside NGC 7252: it resembles a face-on spiral galaxy, yet it is only 10,000 light years across. It is believed that this pinwheel-shaped structure is a remnant of a collision between two galaxies. Within a few billion years, NGC 7252 will look like an elliptical galaxy with a small inner disk due to the exhaustion of the gases in the galaxy.

The central region of the galaxy is home to hundreds of massive, ultra-luminous clusters of young stars that appear as bluish knots of light. These young clusters were created in the suspected galaxy merger, that pushed gases into these regions and caused a burst of star formation. The most conspicuous of them is one known as W3, which has a mass of around 8×10^{7} M_{☉}. This object, also the most luminous super star cluster known to date, has properties more similar to an ultra-compact dwarf galaxy and differs only from those galaxies because of its age (300–500 million years).

An emission nebula seen near the outskirts of the galaxy may be similar to the famous Hanny's Voorwerpje, a faint ionization echo from the output of a central supermassive black hole. The oxygen III emission from this nebula may have been excited by the sputtering output of the black hole. This suggests the black hole's activity has been falling sharply over the past 20,000–200,000 years.

== See also ==
- NGC 7727, a similar galaxy, also in Aquarius.
