= Hanny's Voorwerp =

Astronomical object appearing as a bright blob, discovered by Hanny van Arkel

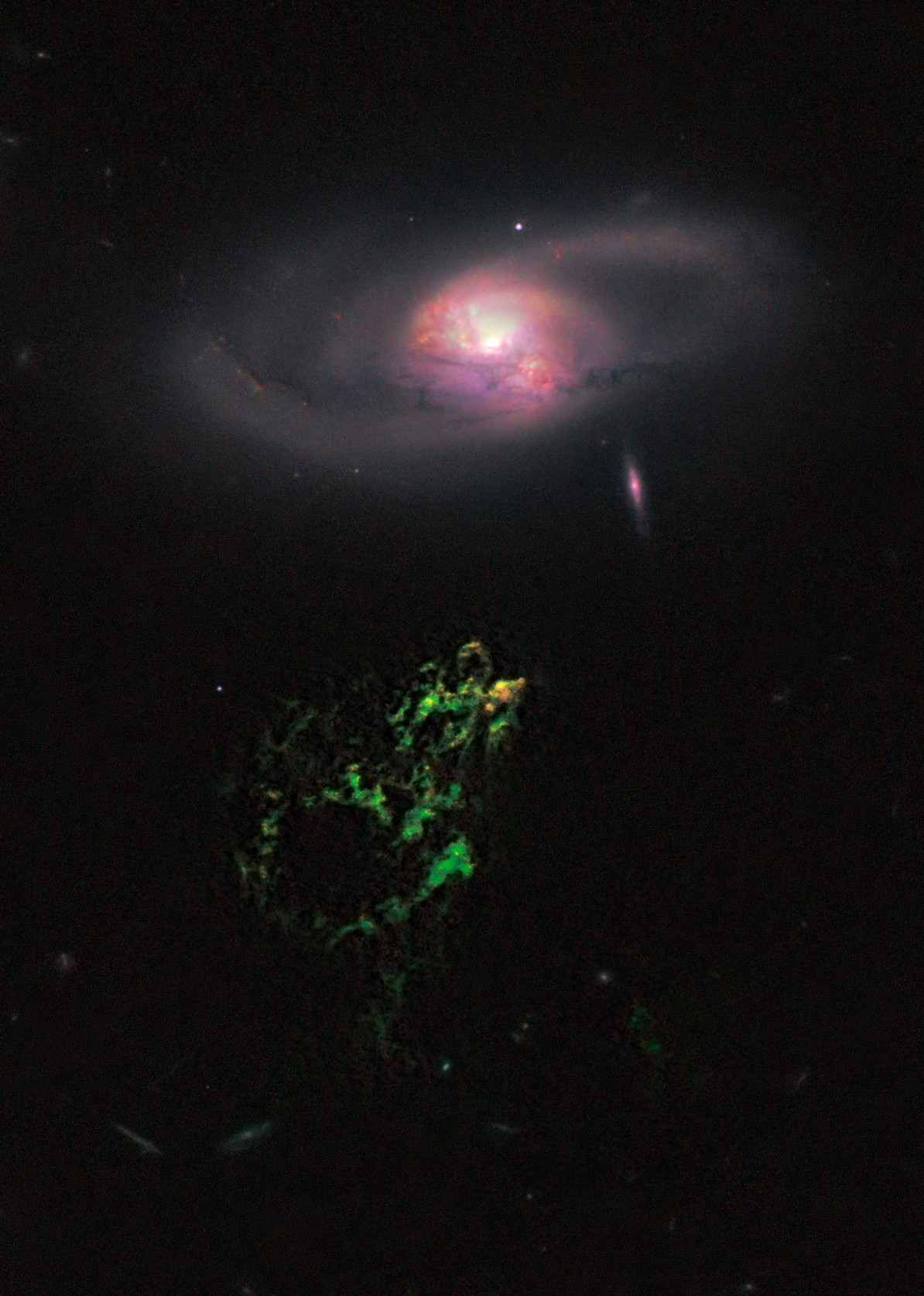
- Object type: Quasar ionization echo
- Other designations: SDSS J094103.80+344334.2

Observation data (Epoch J2000)
- Constellation: Leo Minor
- Right ascension: 09^{h} 41^{m} 03.81^{s}
- Declination: +34° 43′ 34.3″
- Distance: 650 Mly (199 Mpc)
- In visual light (V)
- Apparent magnitude: 19
- Notable features: Associated with spiral galaxy IC 2497
- Related media on Wikimedia Commons

Hanny's Voorwerp /ˈhʌniz ˈvɔːrwɛərp/ (Dutch for Hanny's object) is an instance of an astronomical phenomenon called a quasar ionization echo. It was discovered in 2007 by Dutch schoolteacher Hanny van Arkel while she was participating as a volunteer in the Galaxy Zoo project, part of the Zooniverse group of citizen science websites. Photographically, it appears as a bright blob close to spiral galaxy IC 2497 in the constellation Leo Minor.

== Description ==
Hanny's Voorwerp (HsV) is about the size of a small galaxy and has a central hole over 16,000 light years across. In an image taken with the Hubble Space Telescope, HsV is colored green, a standard false color that is used to represent the presence of several luminous emission lines of glowing oxygen. HsV has been shown to be at the same distance from Earth as the adjacent galaxy IC 2497, which is about 650 million light-years away.

Star birth is occurring in the region of HsV that faces IC 2497. Radio observations indicate that this is due to an outflow of gas from IC 2497's core which is interacting with a small region of HsV to collapse and form stars. The youngest of these stars are several million years old.

A 40-page comic and associated promotional offers about HsV and the story surrounding it were presented at the 24th Dragon Con in Atlanta on 3 September 2010, as well as first pictures of HsV from the Hubble Space Telescope. The launch was streamed live on UStream.

== Hypotheses ==
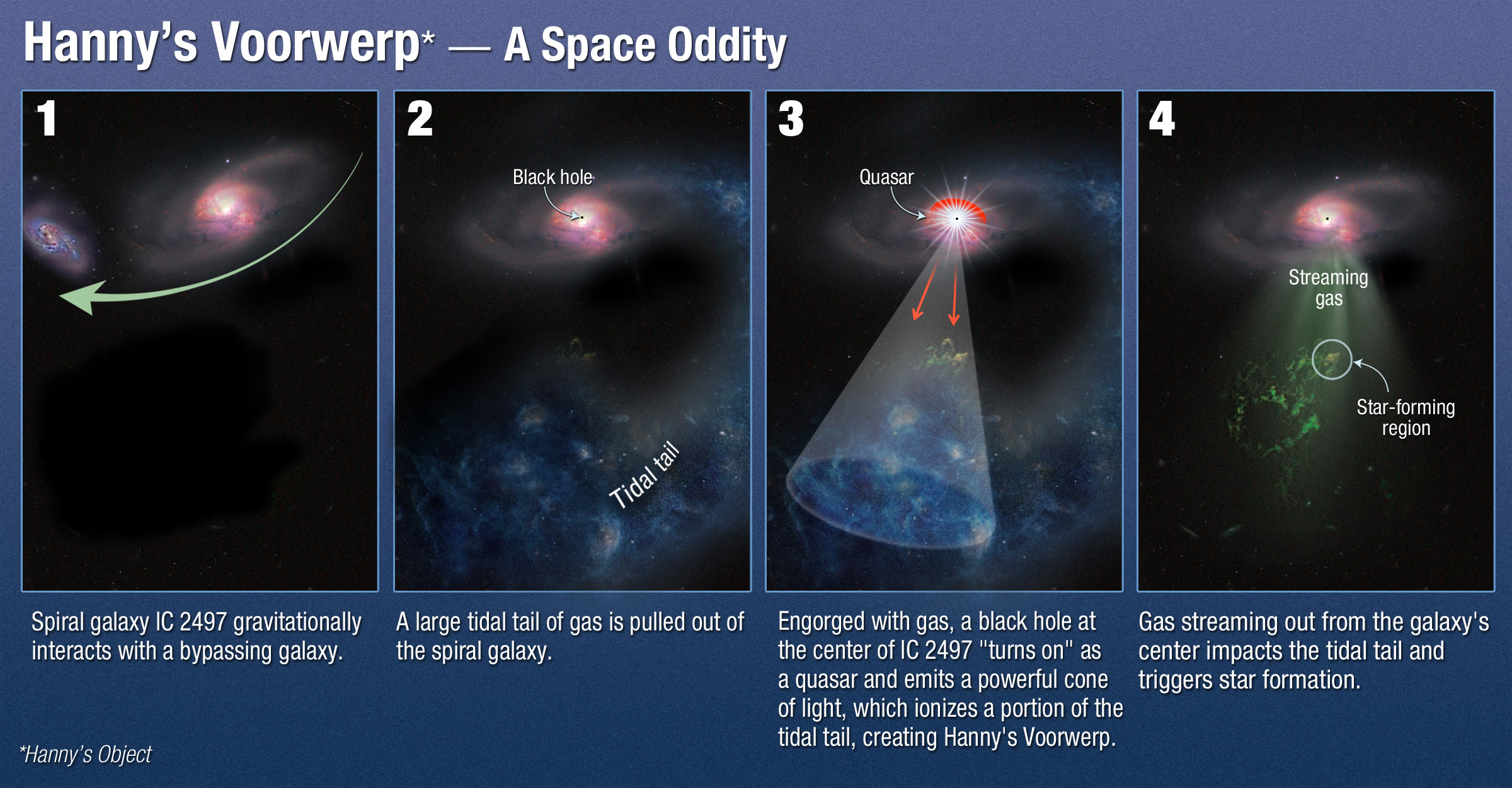
One hypothesis for how Hanny's Voorwerp was formed

One hypothesis suggests that HsV consists of remnants of a small galaxy showing the impact of radiation from a bright quasar event that occurred in the center of IC 2497 about 100,000 years before how it is observed today. The quasar event is thought to have stimulated the bright emission that characterizes HsV. The quasar might have switched off in the last 200,000 years and is not visible in the available images. This might well be due to a process known as AGN feedback.

One possible explanation for the missing light-source is that illumination from the assumed quasar was a transient phenomenon. In this case, its effects on HsV would be still visible because of the distance of several tens of thousands of light years between HsV and the quasar in the nearby galaxy: HsV would show a "light echo" or "ghost image" of events that are older than those currently seen in the galaxy.

On 17 June 2010, a group of researchers at the European VLBI Network (EVN) and the UK's Multi-Element Radio Linked Interferometer Network (MERLIN), proposed another related explanation. They hypothesized that the light comes from two sources: (1) a supermassive black hole at the center of IC 2497, and (2) light produced by an interaction of an energetic jet from the black hole and the gas surrounding IC 2497.

== Voorwerpjes ==
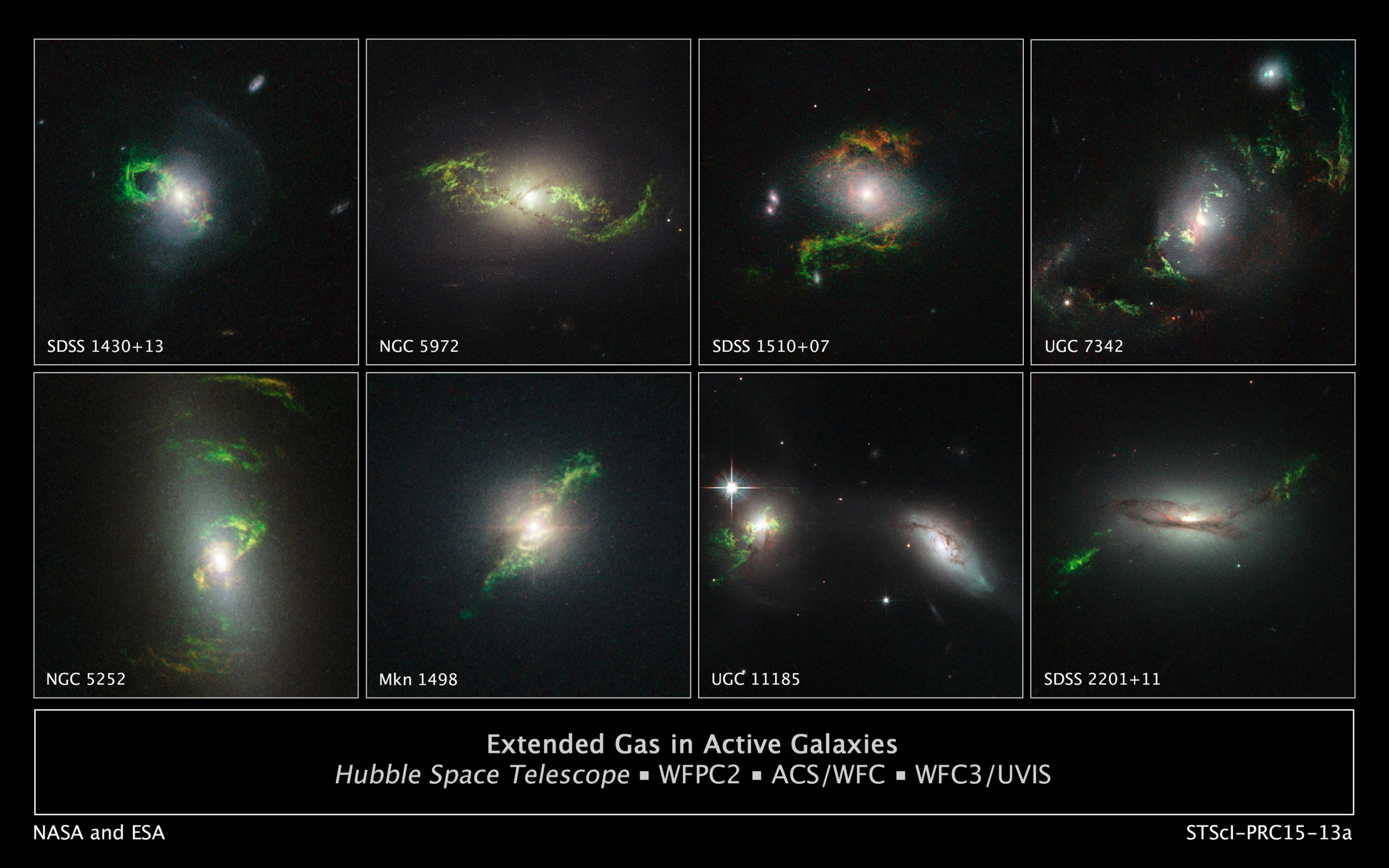
A Hubble Space Telescope combined image of eight quasar ionisation echoes, or Voorwerpjes. CREDITS: NASA, ESA and Prof. William Keel

In February 2012, W. C. Keel and others published a paper in the Monthly Notices of the Royal Astronomical Society. As a result of the interest in similar ionized clouds for the study of both the history and obscuration of Active Galactic Nucleus (AGN), participants in the Galaxy Zoo (GZ) project carried out a wide search for such clouds using data from the Sloan Digital Sky Survey (SDSS). This search yielded a list of 19 galaxies with AGN-photoionized clouds detected to beyond 10 kiloparsecs from the nuclei. These were nicknamed 'Voorwerpjes' from the Dutch for 'small objects'.

In August 2013, F. Schweizer and others published a paper in the Astrophysical Journal. This reports the finding of a Voorwerpje on the outskirts of the well-studied NGC 7252.

In May 2015, W.C. Keel and others published a study in the Astrophysical Journal. This studies 8 of the original 19 Voorwerpjes in greater detail, focusing on "the host-galaxy properties and origin of the gas". Among the telescopes used was the 6 meter BTA-6 at the Special Astrophysical Observatory of the Russian Academy of Science.

In February 2018, Treister et al. studied the galaxy Mrk 463 with VLT/MUSE, VLT/Sinfoni and ALMA. This study found extended emissions around this galaxy and that the supermassive black hole accretion rate on the Mrk 463E nucleus changed by a factor 3–20 in the last 40,000 years, similar to other Voorwerpje galaxies. Galaxy zoo volunteers did identify this galaxy as a candidate Voorwerpje, but the [O III] emission was already described by earlier studies.

In March 2018, Lansbury et al. studied the Teacup Galaxy, also known as the Teacup AGN or SDSS J1430+1339 in x-rays with Swift and Chandra. The extended clouds around the Teacup AGN consist of an "eastern bubble", seen in optical images, and a "western bubble", only seen in radio images by the Very Large Array. The Chandra observations revealed a loop in x-ray emission, consistent with the "eastern bubble". The Chandra data also show evidence for hotter gas within the bubble, which may imply that a wind of material is blowing away from the black hole. Such a wind, which was driven by radiation from the quasar, may have created the bubbles found in the Teacup. The observations in x-rays revealed a powerful, highly obscured active galactic nucleus. This new result suggests that the AGN might not require fading. The quasar has dimmed by only a factor of 25 or less over the past 100,000 years.

In March 2019, Keel et al. studied AGN photoionization of gas in galaxy pairs. The study found UGC 6081 as a candidate Voorwerpje, using data from the 2.5-meter telescope of the Caucasus Mountain Observatory. The emission extends 18 kpc from both AGN.

=== Gallery ===
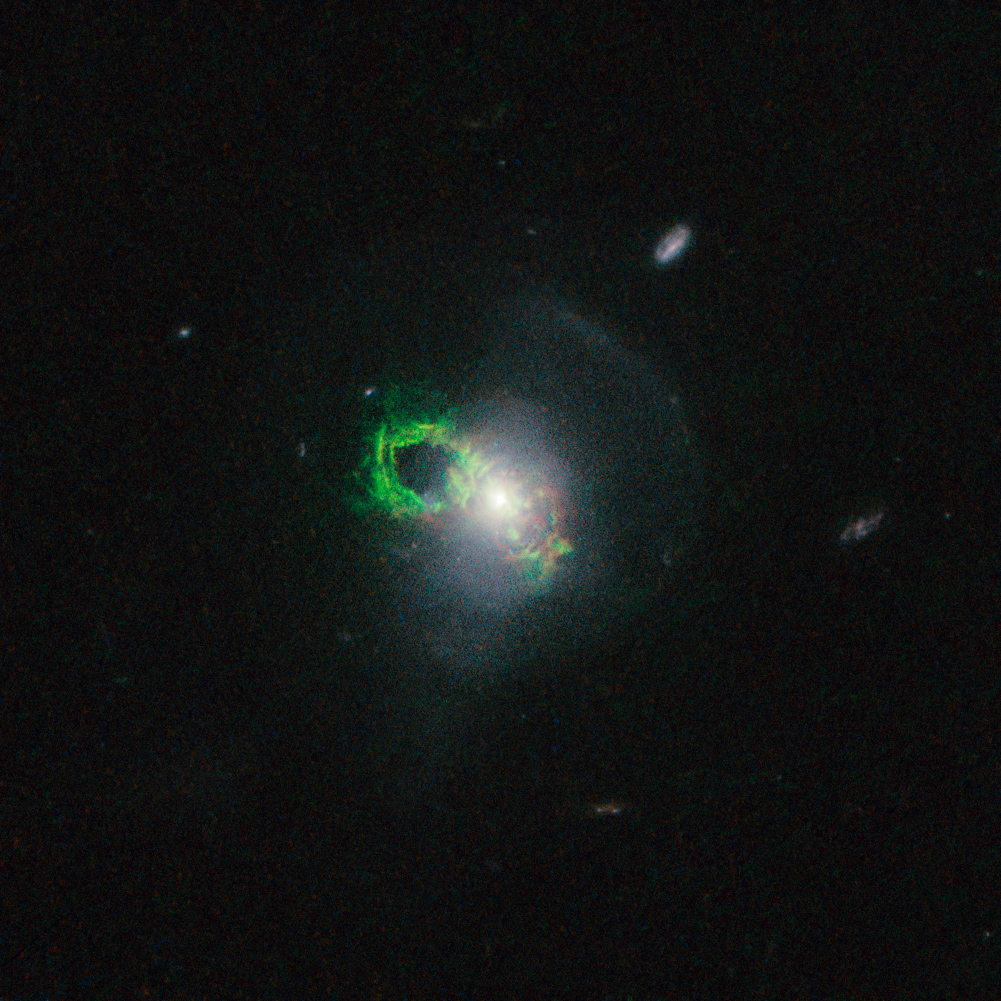
A Hubble Space Telescope image of the Teacup Galaxy SDSS 1430 +13, a Voorwerpje. CREDITS: NASA, ESA and William Keel

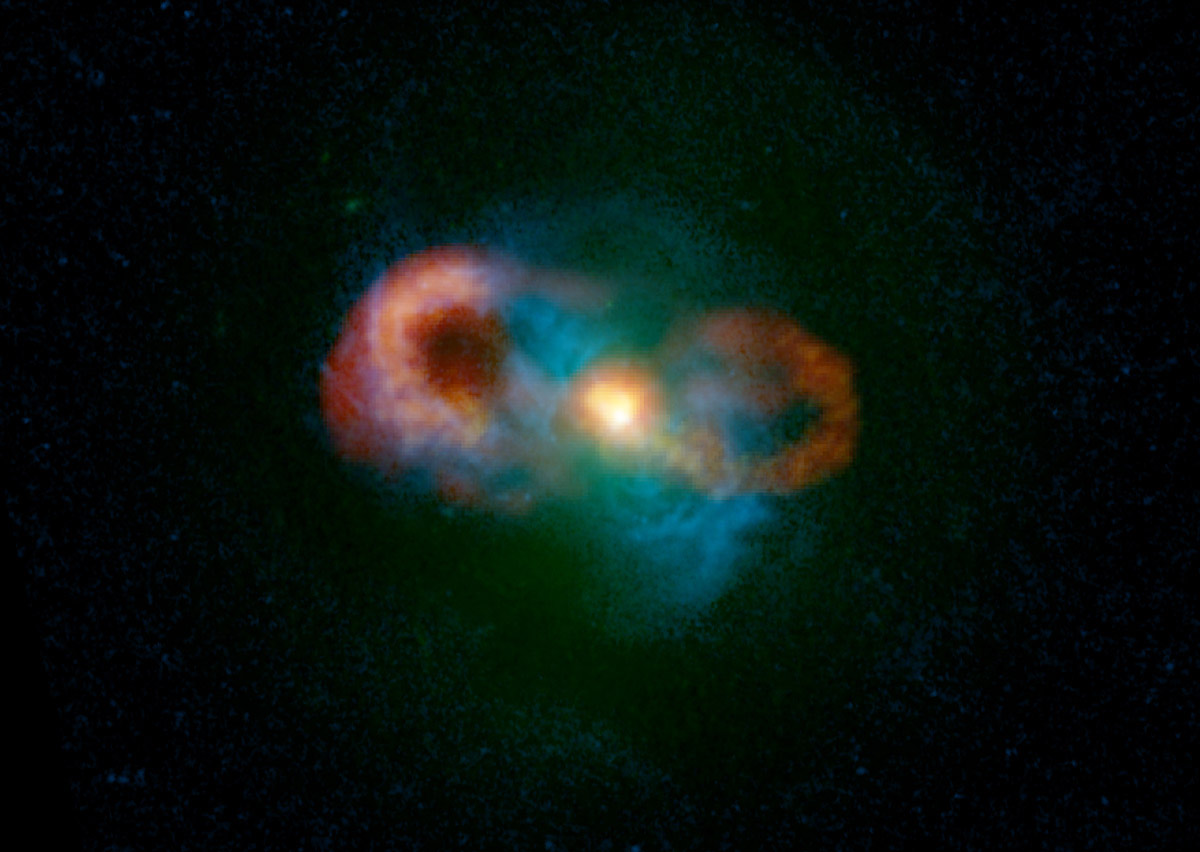
Teacup Galaxy SDSS 1430 +13 with images from Hubble (blue) and the Very Large Array (orange), showing both bubbles

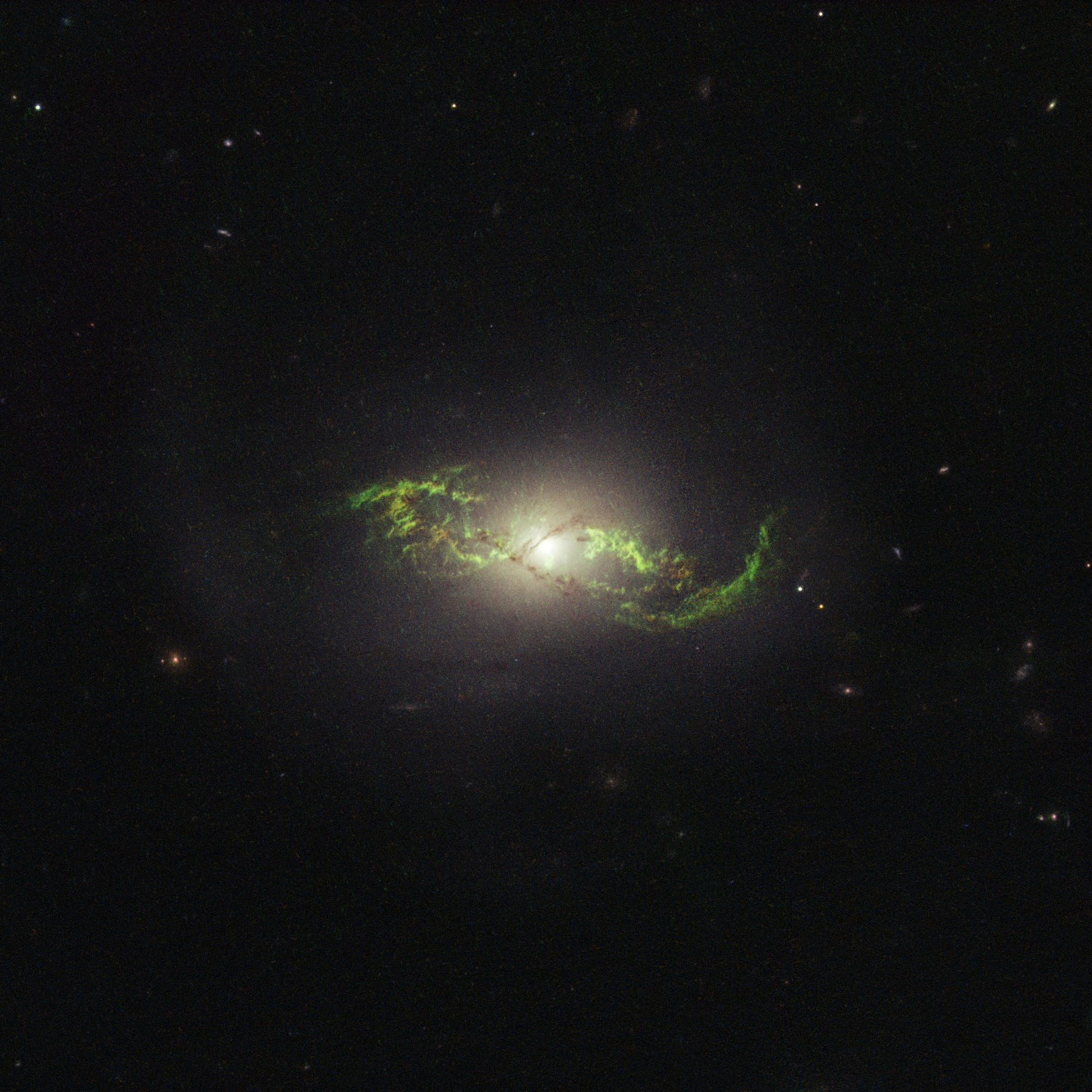
The Voorwerpje around NGC 5972

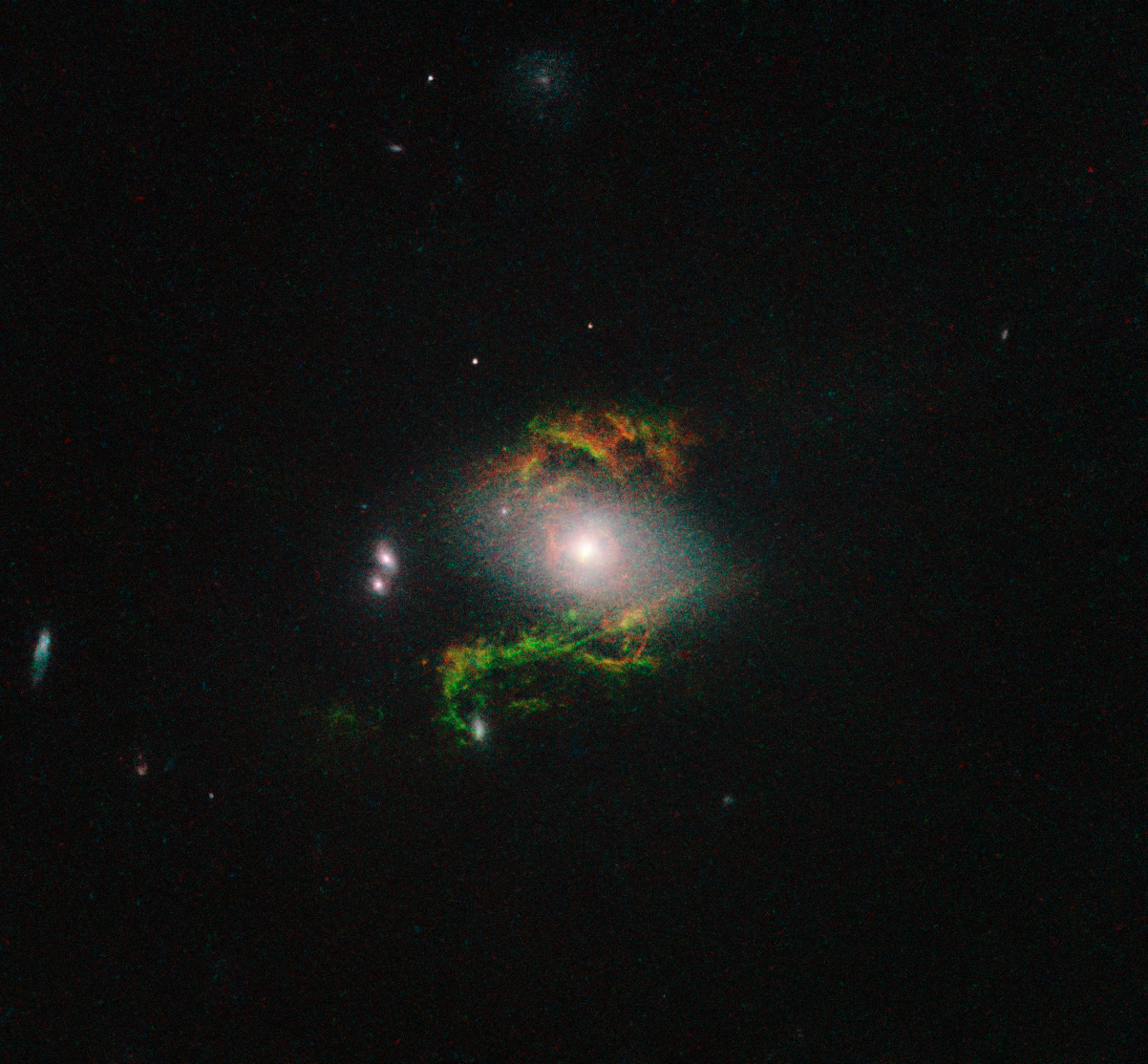
The Voorwerpje around SDSS 1510+07

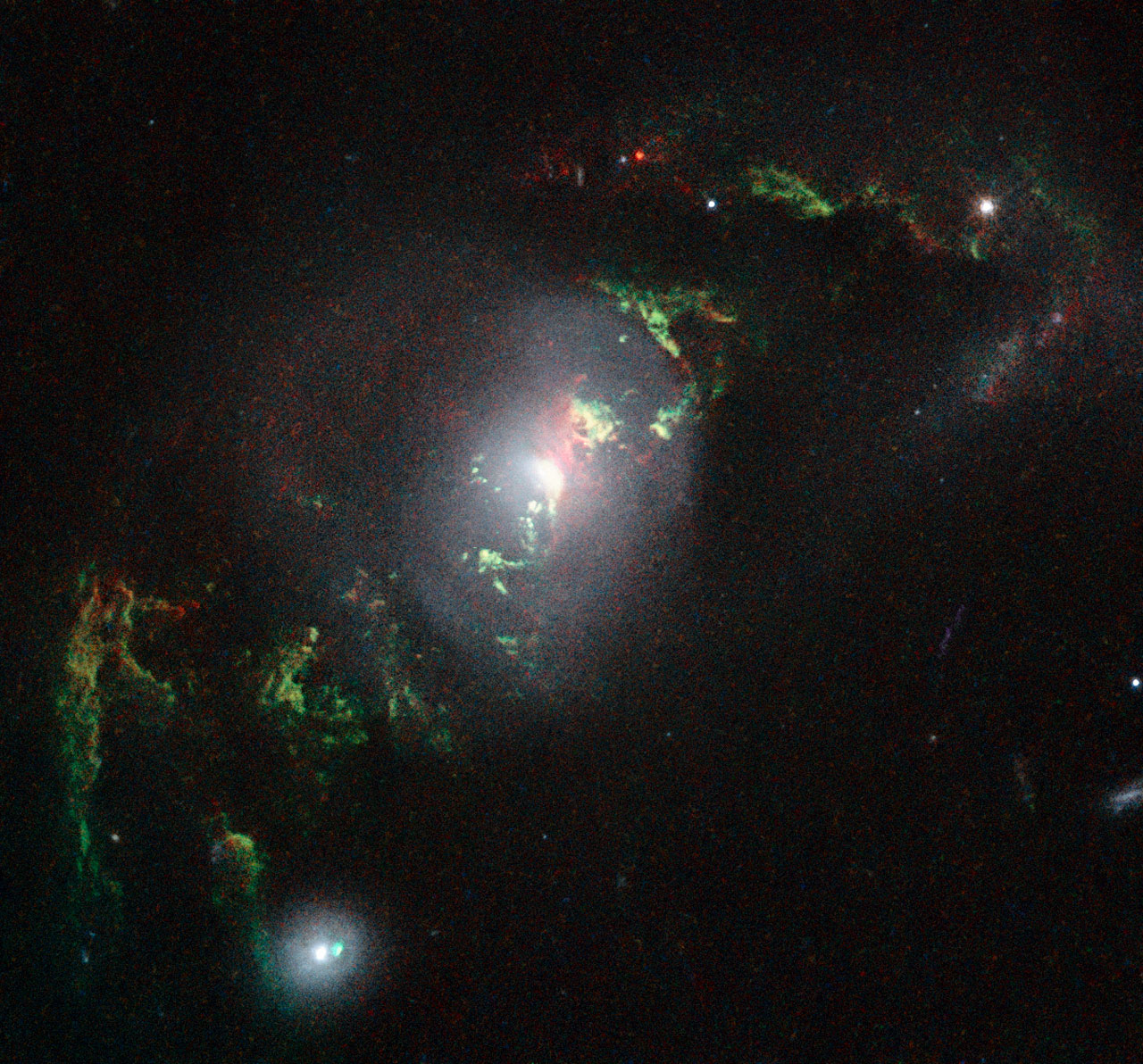
The Voorwerpje around UGC 7342

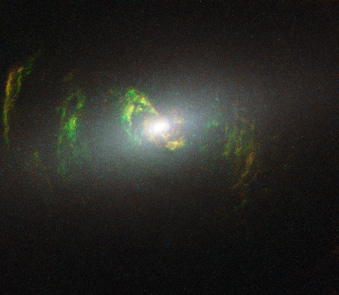
The Voorwerpje around NGC 5252

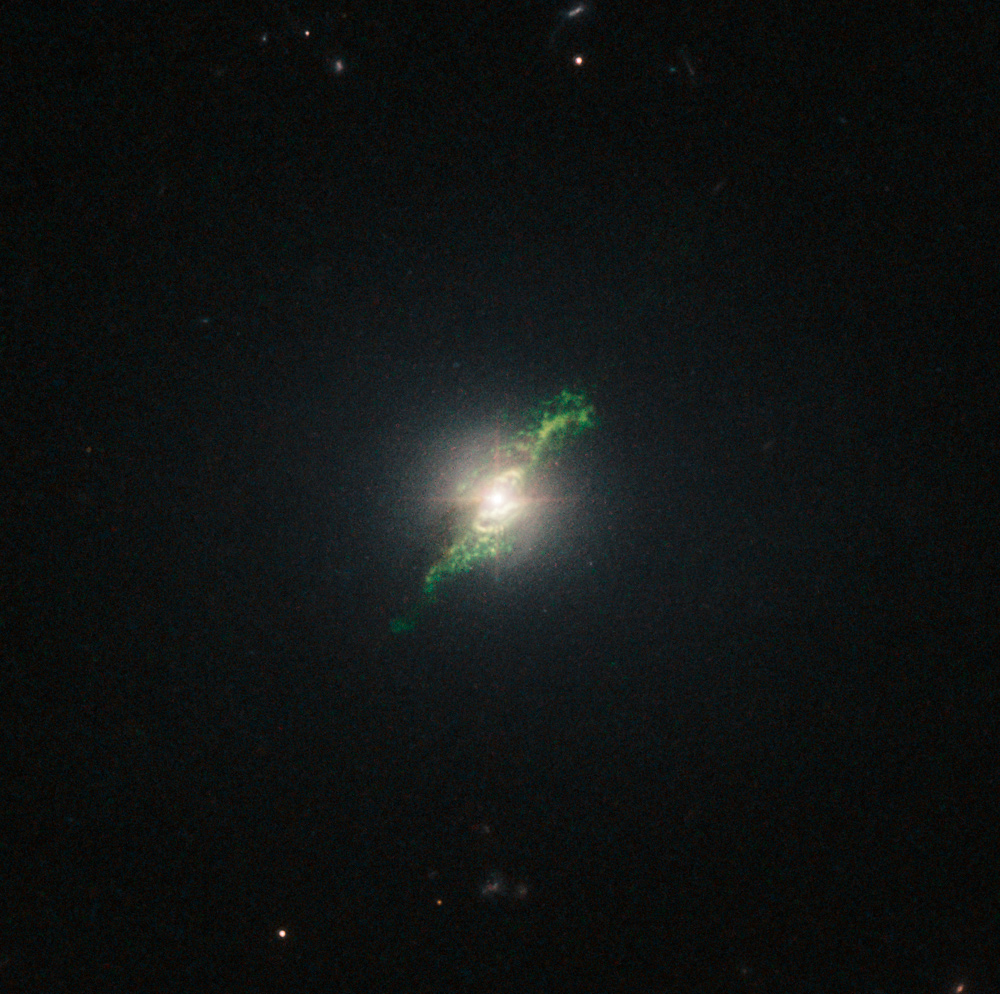
The Voorwerpje around Markarian 1498

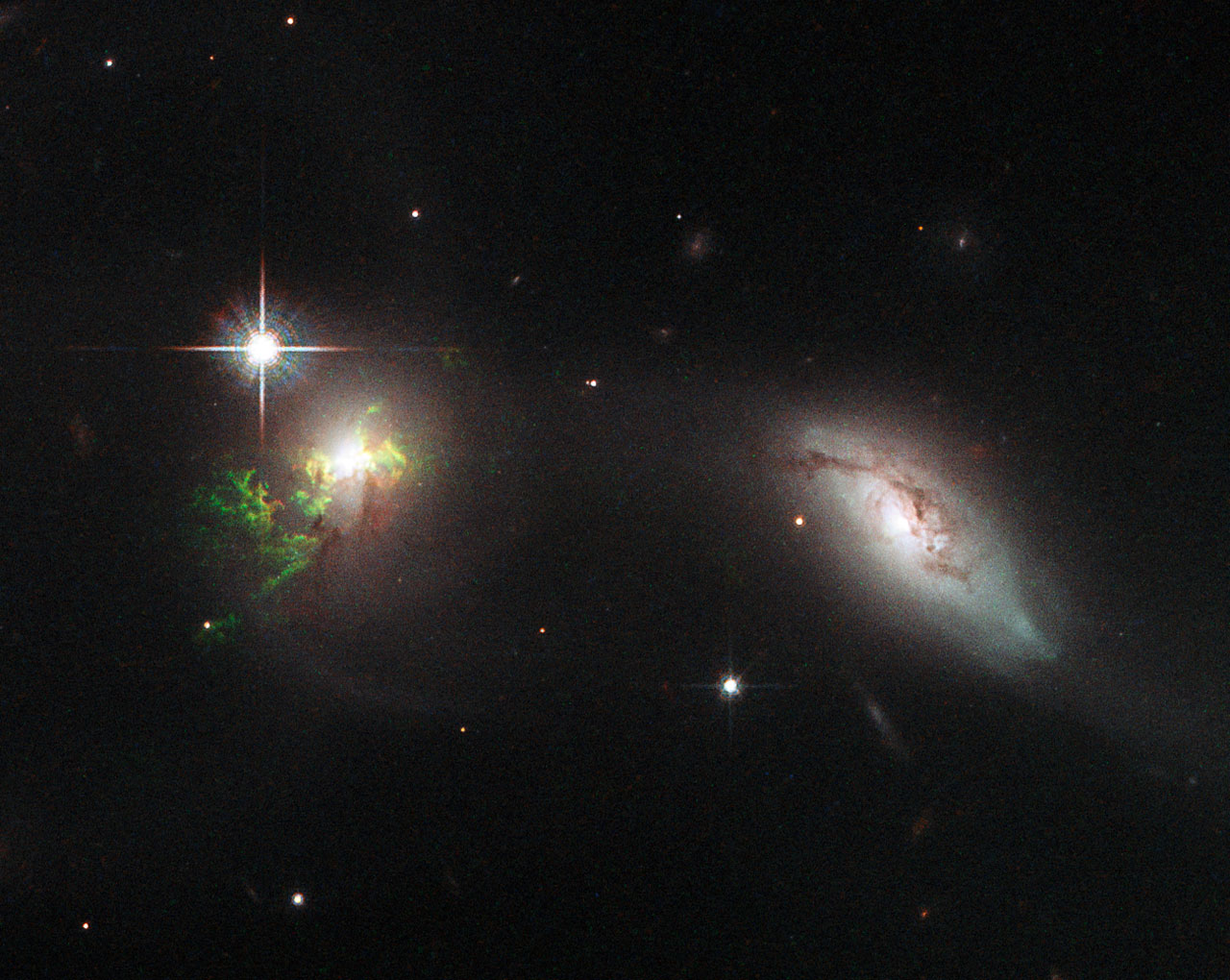
The Voorwerpje around UGC 11185

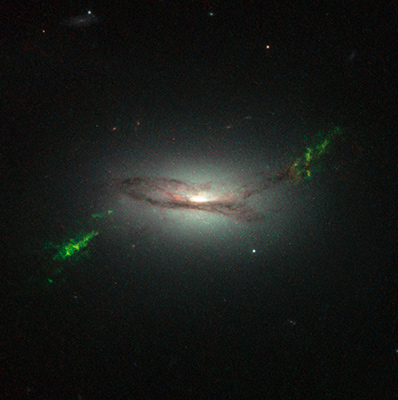
The Voorwerpje around SDSS 2201+11

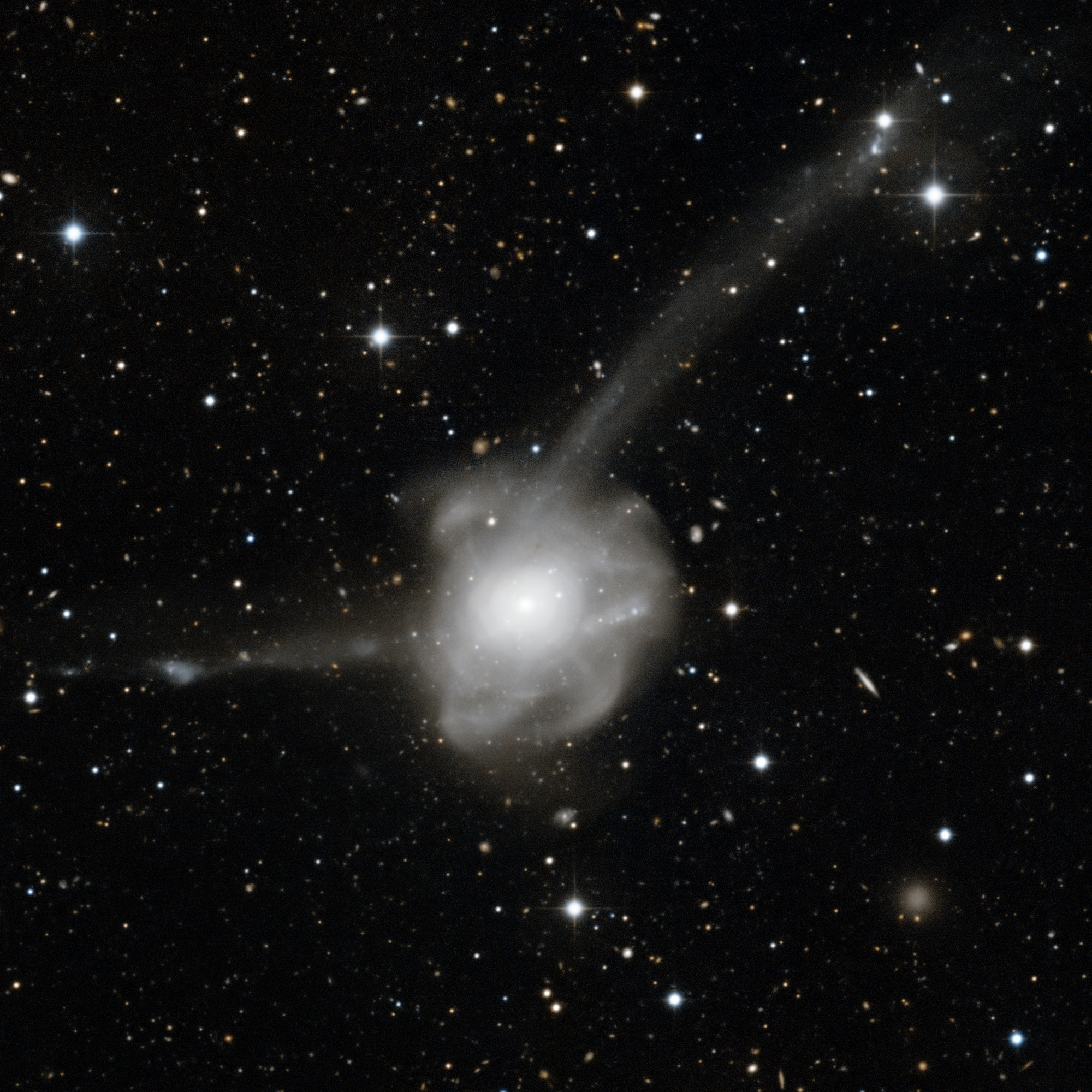
Picture of NGC 7252. This picture was taken by the Wide Field Imager on the MPG/ESO 2.2-metre telescope at ESO's La Silla Observatory.

== Extended X-ray emission in IC 2497 ==
In April 2016, a study was published in the Monthly Notices of the Royal Astronomical Society using data gathered by the Chandra X-ray Observatory in January 2012. The study found extended soft X-ray emission in IC 2497 which suggested the presence of a bubble or cavity surrounding the AGN. The authors hypothesize that this could be due to the bubble being inflated by the AGN, or by a past luminous quasar.

== See also ==
- Green bean galaxy
- Pea galaxy
- Teacup galaxy
