= NGC 5252 =

Galaxy in the constellation of Virgo

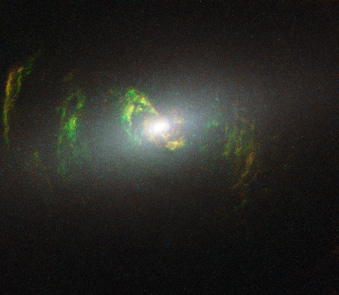
- NGC 5252 by the Hubble Space Telescope

Observation data (J2000 epoch)
- Constellation: Virgo
- Right ascension: 13^{h} 38^{m} 15.9^{s}
- Declination: +04° 32′ 33″
- Redshift: 0.023093 ± 0.000005
- Heliocentric radial velocity: 6,923 ± 1 km/s
- Distance: 221 Mly (67.9 Mpc); 320 Mly (98.4 Mpc)
- Apparent magnitude (V): 13.8

Characteristics
- Type: S0
- Apparent size (V): 1.4′ × 0.8′
- Notable features: Seyfert galaxy

Other designations
- UGC 8622, MCG +01-35-022, PGC 48189

NGC 5252 is a lenticular galaxy located in the constellation Virgo. It is located at a distance of about 220 to 320 million light years from Earth, which, given its apparent dimensions, means that NGC 5252 is about 100,000 light years across. It was discovered by William Herschel on February 2, 1786.

== Characteristics ==
=== Nucleus ===
The nucleus of NGC 5252 has been found to be active and it has been categorised as a type II Seyfert galaxy or type 1.9. A broad H-alpha line has been observed, indicating that a broad line region is partially hidden and the nucleus of NGC 5252 is more active than originally thought.

The most accepted theory for the energy source of active galactic nuclei is the presence of an accretion disk around a supermassive black hole. The mass of the black hole in the centre of NGC 5252 is estimated to be 0.95+1.45
−0.45×10^{9} M_{☉} based on the dynamics of the circumnuclear gas. The mass of the black hole is larger than that observed in Seyfert galaxies and it is more in line with a radio-quiet quasar, with a black hole which is accreting at a slow rate. The X-ray observations of the galaxy indicate a flat spectrum with a soft X-rays element due to ionised gas cones, which also indicate that the galaxy hosts a quasar relic.

The nucleus is surrounded by filamentary structures which glow green due to the ionised oxygen. These were illuminated when the nucleus of the galaxy hosted a quasar.

=== Ultraluminous X-ray source ===
An ultraluminous X-ray source has been observed 22 arcseconds from the nucleus of the galaxy, which corresponds to about 10 kiloparsec at the distance of the galaxy. Its luminosity is estimated to be 1.5×10^{40} erg s−1. The source has also been observed in visual light and radiowaves. In radiowaves it features two components, one east and one west. The redshift of the source is similar to that of the galaxy, indicating that it is gravitationally bound to the galaxy. It probably is an intermediate-mass black hole with a mass over 10^{4} solar masses, probably the remnant of a nucleus of dwarf galaxy with low-luminosity activity, as the black hole is probably accreting weakly.

== See also ==
- Hanny's Voorwerp
