= NGC 7727 =

Peculiar galaxy in the constellation Aquarius

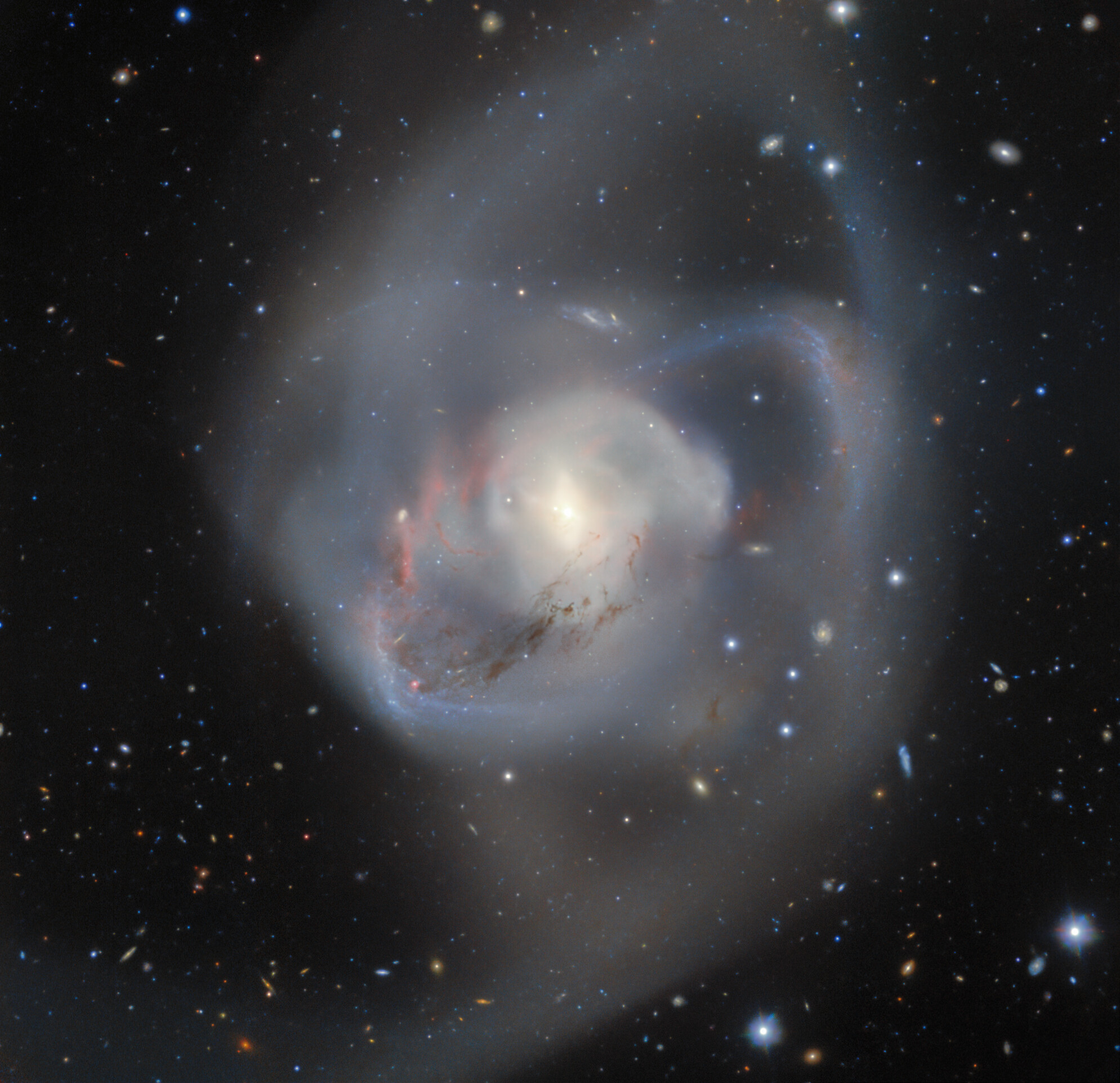
- NGC 7727 by the Gemini Observatory

Observation data (J2000 epoch)
- Constellation: Aquarius
- Right ascension: 23^{h} 39.9^{m}
- Declination: −12° 17′ 34″
- Apparent magnitude (V): 11.5

Characteristics
- Type: SAB(s)a pec
- Apparent size (V): 4.7′ × 3.5′

Other designations
- PGC 72060, Arp 222

NGC 7727 is a peculiar galaxy in the constellation Aquarius. It harbors two galactic nuclei, each containing a supermassive black hole, separated 1,600 light years apart. It was discovered by German-British astronomer William Herschel on 27 November 1785.

== Features ==
This object is located at a distance of 23.3 megaparsecs (76 million light years) from the Milky Way and has a peculiar aspect, with several plumes and streams of irregular shape that explains its inclusion on Halton C. Arp's Atlas of Peculiar Galaxies with the number 222, being classified as a "Galaxy with amorphous spiral arms".

In all likelihood, this system is the product of the merger of two previous spiral galaxies that took place 1 billion years ago, with the aforementioned stellar plumes and streams being the remnants of the disks of the two galaxies that collided to form this object.

Two starlike objects can be seen in NGC 7727's center, at least one of them likely being the former core of one of those two spiral galaxies. In addition to this, 23 objects – candidates to be young globular clusters formed in the collision – can be found in this system.

NGC 7727 is very similar to NGC 7252, another galaxy product of the collision and merging of two former spiral galaxies, in the same constellation. However it has far less gas (neutral hydrogen and molecular hydrogen) than the latter.

NGC 7727's most likely fate is to become an elliptical galaxy in the future, with very little interstellar dust and star formation.

More massive black holes have a stronger gravitational pull on the stars around them, causing them to move faster which makes the spectral lines broader due to redshift, here as seen in a collapsed MUSE data cube image of NGC 7727

In November 2021, scientists announced the discovery of a pair of supermassive black holes in NGC 7727, detected with the Very Large Telescope's multi-unit spectroscopic explorer (MUSE) at the European Southern Observatory. The black holes have masses of 154 and 6.3 million solar masses, and are separated 1,600 light years apart. The pair are among the closest confirmed supermassive black holes to Earth at about 89 million light years away. Although the pair are separated closely enough to gravitationally influence each other, the smaller black hole is not bound in orbit around the larger black hole due to the surrounding mass of the NGC 7727 core region. The black holes will eventually merge in the next 250 million years, producing powerful, low-frequency gravitational waves in the process.

== LGG 480 Group ==
NGC 7727 is part of a galaxy group known as LGG 480 Group or NGC 7727 Group. It has at least 5 confirmed members, which are NGC 7723, NGC 7724, NGC 7727, MCG 2-60-7, MCG 2-60-10.

== See also ==
- List of nearest black holes
