= I Zwicky 1 =

Galaxy in the constellation Pisces

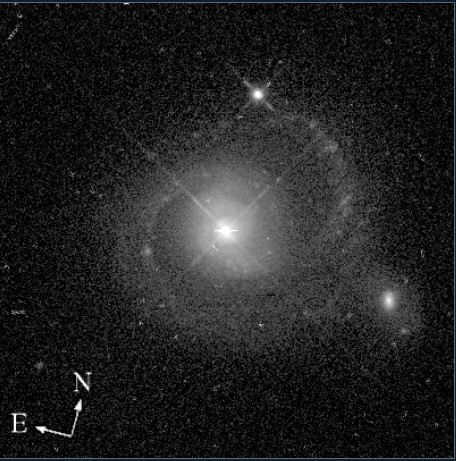
- Hubble Space Telescope image of I Zwicky 1

Observation data (J2000 epoch)
- Constellation: Pisces
- Right ascension: 00h 53m 34.94s
- Declination: +12d 41m 36.20s
- Redshift: 0.061169
- Heliocentric radial velocity: 18,338 km/s
- Distance: 847 Mly (259.7 Mpc)
- Apparent magnitude (V): 0.43
- Apparent magnitude (B): 0.54
- Surface brightness: 14.4

Characteristics
- Type: Sa;Sy1, Sbrst
- Size: 0.5' × 0.5'
- Notable features: Seyfert galaxy containing a quasar

Other designations
- UGC 545, PG 0050+124, PGC 3151, IRAS 00509+1225, RBS 0129, 2E 209, PHL 3072, Mrk 1502, Mrk 9009, NVSS J005334+124133

I Zwicky 1 (shortened to I Zw 1), also known as UGC 545, is a galaxy located in the constellation Pisces. It is located 847 million light-years from Earth and is said to be the nearest quasar (QSO) due to its high optical nuclear luminosity of M_{V} = -23.8 mag.

== Discovery ==
I Zwicky 1 was discovered by Fritz Zwicky in 1964. According to Zwicky, the object is classified as a compact galaxy, whom he commented it as "Variable, blue, spherical, very compact, with a patchy halo." It is listed as the first object in the Zwicky catalogue. At the redshift of 0.0611, I Zwicky 1 shows spectral properties of high-redshift quasars that are blueshifted by 1,350 km-1 according to the study conducted by Buson & Ulrich in 1990.

The photometric history of I Zwicky 1, dates back to 1909, where it has been investigated on Harvard photographic plates. The available data indicates the galaxy is variable and probably undergoes outbursts of about 0.7 mag above a brightness level that is itself variable by about 0.7 mag.

== Characteristics ==
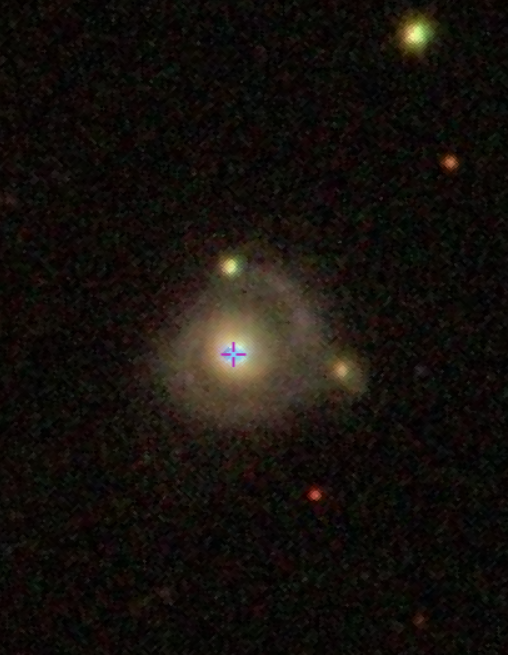
Sloan Digital Sky Survey of I Zwicky 1

The nucleus of I Zwicky 1 is found to be active. It is classified as a prototypical narrow-line Seyfert 1 galaxy and contains high amounts of X-ray luminosity. The galaxy contains a peculiar spectrum, which in addition to the usual broad- and narrow-line regions, there are two emission regions emitting broad and blue shifted [O III] lines making it a peculiarly interesting object. The QSO sits inside its host galaxy which is revealed to be a face-on spiral galaxy. It shows two asymmetric spiral arms and knots of star formation. This makes I Zwicky 1 an ideal candidate for studying properties of QSO hosts. It is also possible that certain tidal interactions triggers activity in I Zwicky 1, both starburst and QSO.

I Zwicky 1 is classified a Markarian galaxy (designated both Mrk 1502 and Mrk 9009). Compared to other galaxies, the nucleus emits excessive amounts of ultraviolet rays. This is caused by undergoing a strong starburst located in the central ring-like area of the galaxy.

== Further study on I Zwicky 1 ==
I Zwicky 1 shows existence of V-, R-, and H-bands with sturdy carbon monoxide (CO) featured in the J = 1-0 and J = 2-1 lines. When further observed, researchers found that the J = 1-0 line is brighter compared to the J = 2-1 line found with less luminosity. Given location in galactic molecular clouds, the carbon monoxide must be larger on the scale of the 26 kpc J = 1-0 beam size, with optical depth and being thermalized.

Researchers who studied interstellar medium and star formation, found out a two-component model is required for I Zwicky 1 in which 2/3 of the far-infrared brightness originates in the disk and one-third originates from the nucleus. The star-forming rate, efficiency of the disk and the nucleus of I Zwicky 1 was estimated by researchers, whom they found that the values are similar to the luminosity of galaxies studied by IRAS. Overall, the disc star formation, is closer to topmost values of ~30 L_sun_/M_sun_ that is found inside galactic star-forming regions of the Milky Way such as M17 or W51. When looking at its nuclear near-infrared colors analysis, researchers suggest I Zwicky 1 has a combined quasar nucleus and defunct stellar component that matches about 10 to 20% of the flux density at 2.2 microns. This suggests the size of I Zwicky 1's molecular bulge is estimated to be 1" to 2" (1.2-2.4 kpc). But only the nucleus is revealed through optical spectrum and large X-ray luminosity.

Millimeter Spectroscopy

Further studies showed the mapping of ^{12}CO (10) line emission in I Zwicky 1 whom researchers conducted observations with Institut de radioastronomie millimétrique (IRAM) millimeter interferometer on the Plateau de Bure, France, between January and February 1995. There, they placed four 15 m antennas in four different configurations. With 24 baselines provided by the four 15 m antennas, ranging from 24 to 288 m in length, they were supplied by SIS receivers with single-sideband (SSB) system temperatures of 170 K above the atmosphere. Located at redshift 0.0611, the observed frequency of I Zwicky 1 was 108.633 GHz.

The CO maps were seen by the observations from IRAM 30m telescope. This resolution of a synthesized beam was uniform weighted of 19, but five resolution CLEAN maps (natural weighting) were made by spectral resolutions of 10 km s^{−1} and 40 km s^{−1} to examine the extended disk structure and velocity field. For the core component, researchers used the 19 resolution CLEANed maps with a spectral resolution of 20 km s^{−1}. To investigate the structure dynamics of the nucleus, which they reckoned these velocity maps together with p-v diagrams alongside major and minor kinematic axes of I Zwicky 1.

Near-Infrared Spectroscopy and Imaging

I Zwicky 1 was observed by K-band (2.20 m) in January, 1995 with a MPE imaging spectrometer making use of 3D images with a 3.6 m telescope in Calar Alto, Spain. The observations in the H-band (1.65 m) on the other hand, were carried out in December 1995, at the William Herschel Telescope located in La Palma, Canary Islands. From two observations, researchers found that the image scale was 05 pixel^{−1} and total integration time on source was 4200 s and 1530 s for the K-band and H-band, respectively.

== Molecular gas properties ==
The properties of the molecular gas are important for acknowledging the total star formation and powering AGNs, given molecular clouds are the major reservoirs for such occurrences. According to researchers, looking inside the spiral arms of the QSO host galaxy, they detected the molecular line emission. Seeing this, they were able to break up the line emission into a separate core and disk components. Through analyzing the velocity field, a circumnuclear ring of molecular gas is found. It has a similar size to starburst rings in nearby galaxies. With a spatial resolution of 19 (2.2 kpc), no signs of gas is suggested streaming straight to the nucleus.

== Comparison of starburst rings ==
In a study where starburst rings are observed in galaxies, the rings in I Zwicky 1 are suggested to be formed by gravitational interactions, because of high rates of stars and gas. These rings are detected in midinfrared continuum, near-infrared colors, molecular gas line emission, and H line emission. Although, the overall structure of these rings are not even, it is feasible they are formed by two twisted spiral arms on every side of the nucleus. To see whether the rings are unique or ordinary, researchers found two other galaxies, NGC 7552 and NGC 7469. They found the ring properties are alike to one another for all three galaxies. But there is a difference in total bolometric luminosity which might be linked to the internal structure of the rings, and to a certain, starburst regions are fueled within the ring region.

The starburst rings of I Zwicky one are three times older compared to those in NGC 7552 and NGC 7469. Using the comparison, the molecular ring researchers detected in the ^{12}CO(10) line emission, might contain starburst like other circumnuclear rings. This indicates the luminosity fraction observed for QSOs and Seyfert galaxies is mainly caused by circumnuclear starbursts in the centers of host galaxies, and that the AGNs are not only responsible for energy output overall in the optical and infrared light. Such star formation activity contributed to bolometric luminosity only range about 10 to 50% in I Zwicky 1, compared to observations for NGC 7469.

To sum things up, a young starburst is associated with this circumnuclear ring. The properties of this starburst ring in I Zwicky 1, are similar to nuclear activity sources. When looking at similarities, the rings are a possible common phenomenon that contributes significant fraction to luminosity in central regions.

== Supermassive black hole ==
The supermassive black hole in I Zwicky 1, has an estimated mass of M. = 9.30^{+1.26} _{- 1.38} × 10^{6} solar masses. This suggests the accretion rate is 203.9^{+61.0}_{-65.8} L edd c-2, indicating there is a super-Eddington accretor, where LEdd is the Eddington luminosity and c is the speed of light. By splitting up Hubble Space Telescope images, researchers find the stellar mass of the bulge of its host galaxy is similar to log(M budge/M○ = 10.92 + 0.07. Looking at these values, they suggest the black hole has bulge mass ratio of ~10−4, which is smaller when compared to classical bulges of elliptical galaxies.

An article published in 2021, found out according to observations by ESA's XMM-Newton and NASA's NuSTAR space telescopes, the black hole emits out X-ray flares from the region. Further analysis by researches showed, brief flashes of photons that are found consistent in the re-emergence of emission, proving they had reverberated from black hole's accretion disk in form light echoes, which are subsequently distorted and extended by the galaxy's strong gravitational field.
