= NGC 5728 =

Spiral galaxy in the constellation Libra

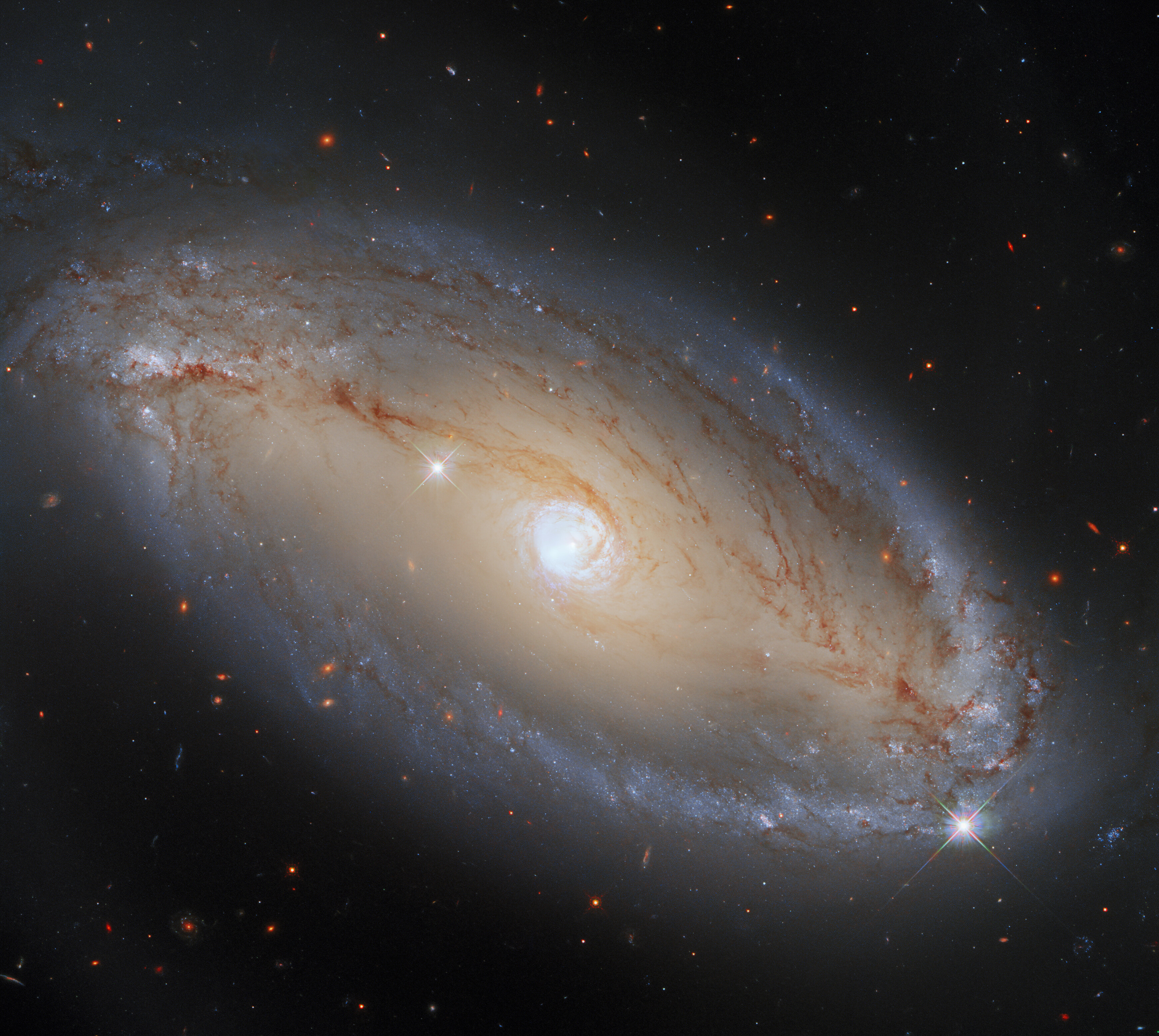
- Hubble Space Telescope image of the central region of NGC 5728

Observation data (J2000 epoch)
- Constellation: Libra
- Right ascension: 14^{h} 42^{m} 23.897^{s}
- Declination: −17° 15′ 11.09″
- Redshift: 0.00935±0.00007
- Heliocentric radial velocity: 2,803±20 km/s
- Distance: 145.8 ± 10.3 Mly (44.70 ± 3.15 Mpc)
- Apparent magnitude (V): 13.40
- Apparent magnitude (B): 14.34
- Absolute magnitude (V): −18.3

Characteristics
- Type: SAB(r)a? Sy 1.9
- Mass: 7.2×10^{10} M_{☉}
- Size: 97.4 kly (29.86 kpc)
- Apparent size (V): 203.3″

Other designations
- GC 3977, GSC 06158-01021, h 1866, H 1–184, LEDA 52521, MCG -03-37-005, PBC J1442.4-1714, PGC 52424

NGC 5728 is an active barred spiral galaxy located 146 million light years away in the southern constellation of Libra. It was discovered on May 7, 1787 by William Herschel. The designation comes from the New General Catalogue of J. L. E. Dreyer, published in 1888. It has an apparent visual magnitude of 13.40 and spans an angle of 3.4 arcminutes. The galaxy shows a red shift of 0.00935 and has a heliocentric radial velocity of 2,803 km/s. It has an estimated mass of 72 billion times the mass of the Sun and stretches around 30 kpc across.

The morphological classification of this galaxy is SAB(r)a?, which indicates a weakly barred spiral galaxy (SAB) with a ring-like structure (r) and possible tightly wound arms (a?). The Spitzer galactic survey lists a morphology code of (R_{1})SB(r′l,bl,nr,nb)0/a, meaning a barred spiral having a closer outer ring and an inner pseudo-ring/lens, plus a nuclear ring and bar/bar-lens. Vera Rubin described it as having a "distinct elliptical structure intermediate between a spheroid and a disk". Asymmetrical gas distribution in the galaxy suggests it has undergone a minor merger event that did not produce tidal tails.

In addition to the main bar, there is what appears to be a counter-rotating nuclear bar in the inner ~10″, which is at an angle of 60° from the main bar. There is evidence of star formation, but that has nearly ceased in the nuclear region due to the molecular gas being all but exhausted. The nuclear bar, if it exists, now consists of stars with little surrounding gas.

This is a Seyfert galaxy of type 2, indicating it has an obscured active galactic nucleus (AGN) powered by a supermassive black hole at the center. The estimated mass of this object is 3.4×10^{7} M_{☉} and it is accreting mass at the rate of 2.7×10^{−2} M_{☉}·yr^{−1}. Energy released by the AGN is visible in the form of ionized cones that extend outward from the nucleus to a distance of more than 2.5 kpc, and lie across the line of sight from the Earth. X-ray and radio jets have been detected. The nucleus is being fed by spiraling filaments and dust lanes from the surrounding galaxy. The AGN itself is hidden behind a bar of dust approximately 64 pc in length. The outflow from the core is encountering the galactic ring at a distance of 1 kpc and is significantly enhancing star formation in that region compared to other parts of the ring.

One supernova has been observed in NGC 5728. The Type Ia supernova SN 2009Y was discovered by Ralph Martin on 1 February 2009, and independently by the Lick Observatory Supernova Search (LOSS) on 2 February 2009. It was located 24.7″ north and 9.3″ east of the center of NGC 5728, and reached magnitude 16.0.
