= IC 2497 =

Spiral galaxy in the constellation Leo Minor

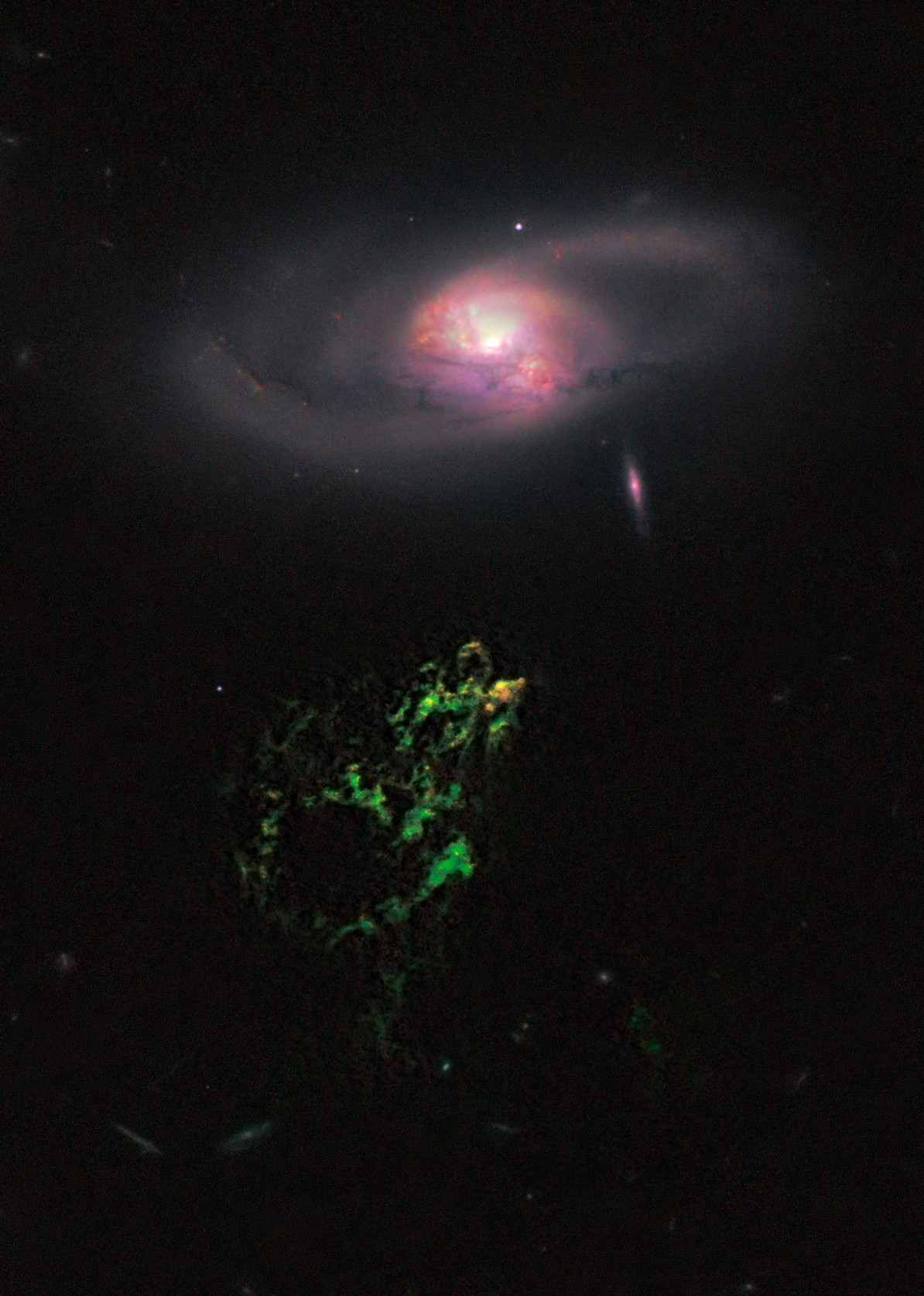
- IC 2497 with Hanny's Voorwerp by HST; Credit: NASA, ESA, W. Keel (University of Alabama), and the Galaxy Zoo Team

Observation data (J2000.0 epoch)
- Constellation: Leo Minor
- Right ascension: 09^{h} 41^{m} 04.076^{s}
- Declination: +34° 43′ 58.57″
- Redshift: 0.051633
- Distance: 650 Mly (199.29 Mpc)

Characteristics
- Apparent size (V): 0.390' × 0.320'

Other designations
- IRAS 09380+3457, 2MASX J09410407+3443585, IC 2497, LEDA 165538, PGC 165538

IC 2497 is a spiral galaxy close to the intergalactic cloud Hanny's Voorwerp. The galaxy is a former quasar, whose light lit up Hanny's Voorwerp, which is now a light echo of that extinct quasar. It is about 45,000–70,000 light-years (14,000–21,000 pc) away from Hanny's Voorwerp. The quasar shut down sometime in the last 70,000 years. This revises current theories of quasar operation, as the quasar is quiescent, shutting down much faster than was thought possible, and is much cooler than predicted. The galaxy is currently 100 to 10,000 times dimmer than it was when its quasar burned into Hanny's Voorwerp.

== Supernova ==
One supernova has been observed in IC 2497.

- SN 2020ilb (Type Ia, mag. 19.0868) was discovered by the Zwicky Transient Facility on 29 April 2020.
