= NGC 7075 =

Galaxy in the constellation of Grus

Observation data (J2000 epoch)
- Constellation: Grus
- Right ascension: 21^{h} 31^{m} 33.0^{s}
- Declination: −38° 37′ 05″
- Redshift: 0.018479
- Heliocentric radial velocity: 5,540 km/s
- Distance: 290 Mly (89 Mpc)
- Group or cluster: IC 5105 Group (LGG 445)
- Apparent magnitude (V): 14.13

Characteristics
- Type: E
- Apparent size (V): 1.2 x 0.9

Other designations
- 2MASX J21313299-3837046, MCG -07-44-020, PGC 66895, PKS 2128-388, ESO 343-G 004

NGC 7075 is an elliptical galaxy located about 290 million light-years away in the constellation of Grus. NGC 7075 was discovered by astronomer John Herschel on September 4, 1834. It is classified a radio galaxy.

NGC 7075 contains a Fanaroff-Riley class I radio source called PKS 2128-388. It has an unresolved core component. Its eastern radio jet, is found to have faint emission which extends out by ≈1.9 kpc from its nucleus. A CO disc is found in NGC 7075 but unresolved. According to Atacama Large Millimeter Array observations, a hole is present in the gas distribution, indicating gas disc disturbance.

== IC 5105 Group ==
According to A. M. Garcia, NGC 7075 is part of the IC 5105 group (also known as LGG 445). This group of galaxies contains at least 19 members. The other galaxies in the group are: NGC 7057, NGC 7060, NGC 7072, NGC 7087, NGC 7110, NGC 7130, IC 5105, IC 5105A, IC 5128, IC 5139, and eight galaxies in the ESO catalogue.

== See also ==
- List of NGC objects (7001–7840)
- Radio galaxy
- M87
- NGC 7016
