= NGC 7130 =

Galaxy in the constellation Piscis Austrinus

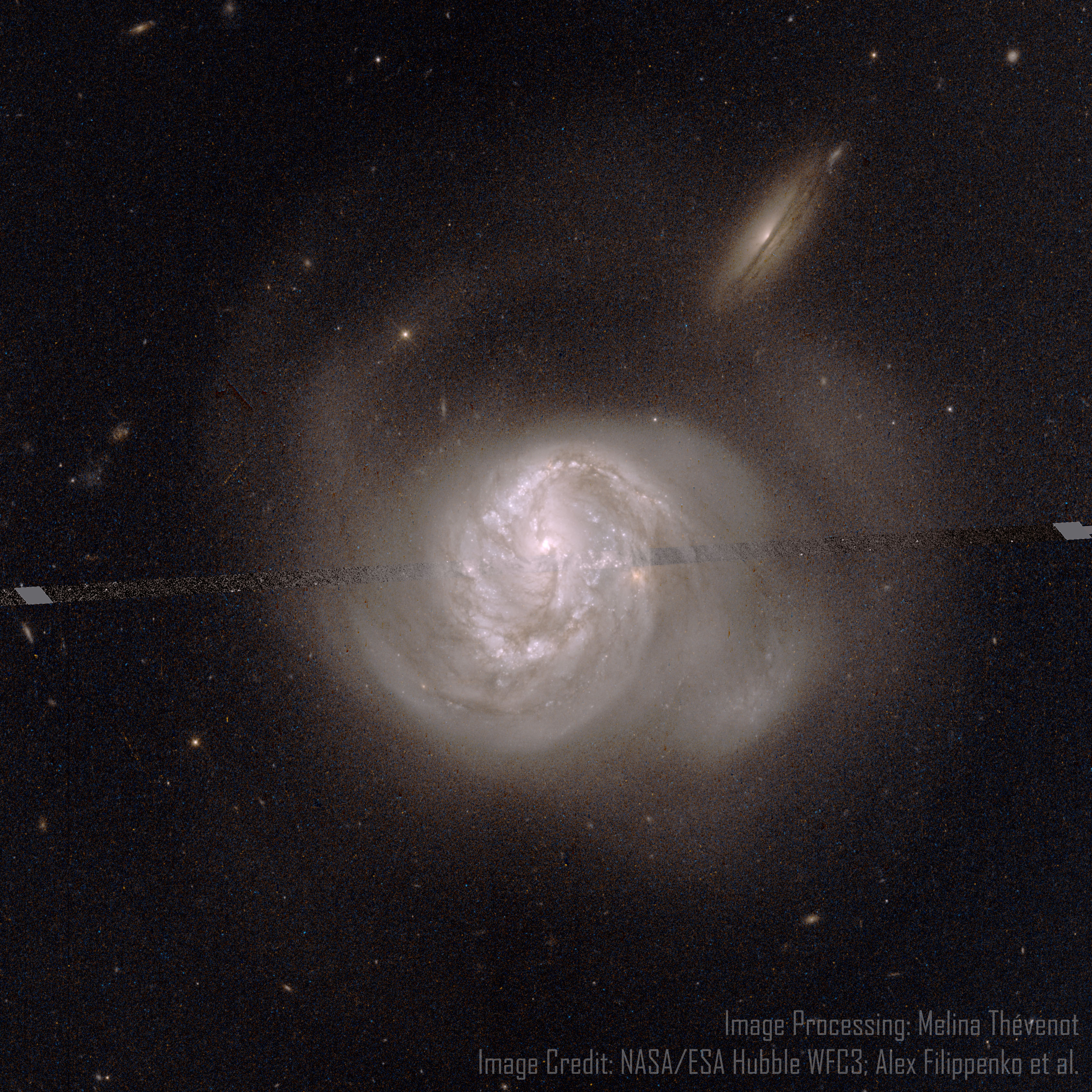
- NGC 7130 by the Hubble Space Telescope

Observation data (J2000 epoch)
- Constellation: Piscis Austrinus
- Right ascension: 21^{h} 48^{m} 19.5^{s}
- Declination: −34° 57′ 04″
- Redshift: 0.016151 ± 0.000050
- Heliocentric radial velocity: 4,842 ± 15 km/s
- Distance: 221 Mly (68 Mpc)
- Apparent magnitude (V): 12.1

Characteristics
- Type: Sa pec
- Size: 187,500 ly (57.51 kpc)
- Apparent size (V): 1.5′ × 1.4′
- Notable features: Seyfert and starburst galaxy

Other designations
- IC 5135, ESO 403- G032, AM 2145-351, MCG -06-47-015, PGC 67387

NGC 7130 (also known as IC 5135) is a spiral galaxy located in the constellation Piscis Austrinus. It is located at a distance of about 220 million light years from Earth, which, given its apparent dimensions, means that NGC 7130 is about 188,000 light years across. It was discovered by John Herschel on September 25, 1834, and discovered independently by Lewis Swift on September 17, 1897. The location of the galaxy given in the New General Catalogue was off by 30 arcminutes in declination from the location of the galaxy.

== Characteristics ==
NGC 7130 is characterised as a peculiar galaxy based on its distorted shape. The galaxy has two faint arms towards the south, while north of the galaxy there is diffuse H-alpha emission. Two knots with H-alpha emission are observed southeast of the galaxy. The galaxy has star streams and trailing tidal arms. It has been suggested that the distorted shape of NGC 7130 is the result of the interaction with another galaxy. In the infrared K-band a bar is visible. The total infrared luminosity of NGC 7130 is 2.2×10^{11} L_{☉} (10^{11.35} L_{☉}) and it is categorised as a luminous infrared galaxy.

=== Nucleus ===
NGC 7130 has a bright nucleus which is characterised as active. The galaxy features optical emission lines typical of a type 2 Seyfert galaxy, with broad lines and strong emission lines from high ionisation elements, like [He II], however the ultraviolet spectrum is more consistent with the emission produced by young, massive O-type stars, suggesting an active starburst in the nucleus. More detailed observations in ultraviolet reveal an asymmetric circumnuclear starburst ring with several knots. The total span of the ring is one arcsecond, which corresponds to 310 pc, in the north–south direction, and 0.7 arcseconds, which corresponds to 220 pc, in east–west direction. Ultraviolet emission is also observed at the inner part of the spiral arms at the leading edge of the bar.

The galaxy emits also X-rays. Based on observations by Chandra X-ray Observatory it was found that the two thirds of the X-ray emission at 0.3–8 keV of the galaxy comes from the circumnuclear starburst activity and the galaxy disk, while the rest was attributed to an active galactic nucleus (AGN) hidden by a Compton-thick column with column density over 10^{24} cm^{−2}. The percentage attributed to the AGN exceeds 50% at higher energies, over 2 keV. The transition from the emission of the AGN to that of the starburst is smooth, as seen by the different ionisation states of the gas around the nucleus. The extended narrow-line region of NGC 7130 is estimated to have a radius of 1.8±0.8 kpc. There is also an outflowing wind, whose origin however cannot be determined accurately.

In the centre of NGC 7130 lies a supermassive black hole whose mass is estimated to be 3.9×10^{7} M_{☉} (10^{7.59} M_{☉}) based on stellar velocity dispersion. The star formation rate in the central kiloparsec of NGC 7130 is estimated to be 4.3 M_{☉} per year. The total star formation rate of the galaxy is estimated to be 21 M_{☉} per year.

=== Supernovae ===
Two supernovae have been observed in NGC 7130:

- SN 2010bt (Type IIn, mag 15.9) was discovered by Berto Monard on 17 April 2010.
- SN 2017hgz (Type Ia, mag 15.1) was discovered by ASAS-SN on 10 October 2017.

== Nearby galaxies ==
NGC 7130 belongs in a galaxy group known as LGG 445. Other members of the galaxy group include NGC 7057, IC 5105, NGC 7087, NGC 7060, NGC 7072, NGC 7075, NGC 7110, IC 5128, and IC 5139. Near NGC 7130 lie also the distorted NGC 7135, 18 arcminutes to the east, and IC 5131, 12 arcminutes to the west. It has been suggested that the distortion of NGC 7130 was caused by an interaction with one of these two galaxies, however, they have nearly half the redshift.

== See also ==
- NGC 7679 - A similar starburst and active galaxy
