= NGC 7110 =

Galaxy in the constellation Piscis Austrinus

Observation data (J2000 epoch)
- Constellation: Piscis Austrinus
- Right ascension: 21^{h} 42^{m} 12.1278^{s}
- Declination: −34° 09′ 44.767″
- Redshift: 0.017679
- Heliocentric radial velocity: 5300 ± 10 km/s
- Distance: 242.6 ± 17.0 Mly (74.39 ± 5.22 Mpc)
- Apparent magnitude (V): 13.2

Characteristics
- Type: SB(r)b?
- Size: ~117,300 ly (35.96 kpc) (estimated)
- Apparent size (V): 1.3′ × 0.6′

Other designations
- IRAS F21392-3423, 2MASX J21421214-3409436, MCG -06-47-012, PGC 67199, ESO 403- G 016

NGC 7110 is a barred spiral galaxy in the constellation of Piscis Austrinus. Its velocity with respect to the cosmic microwave background is 5044 ± 20 km/s, which corresponds to a Hubble distance of 74.39 ± 5.22 Mpc (~243 million light-years). It was discovered by British astronomer John Herschel on 23 September 1834.

== IC 5105 Group ==
According to A. M. Garcia, NGC 7110 is part of the IC 5105 group (also known as LGG 445). This group of galaxies contains at least 19 members. The other galaxies in the group are: NGC 7057, NGC 7060, NGC 7072, NGC 7075, NGC 7087, NGC 7130, IC 5105, IC 5105A, IC 5128, IC 5139, and eight galaxies in the ESO catalogue.

== Supernova ==
One supernova has been observed in NGC 7110: SN 2023hnl (Type Ia, mag. 17.831) was discovered by ATLAS on 2 May 2023.

== See also ==
- List of NGC objects (7001–7840)
