= NGC 7681 =

Galaxy in the constellation Pegasus

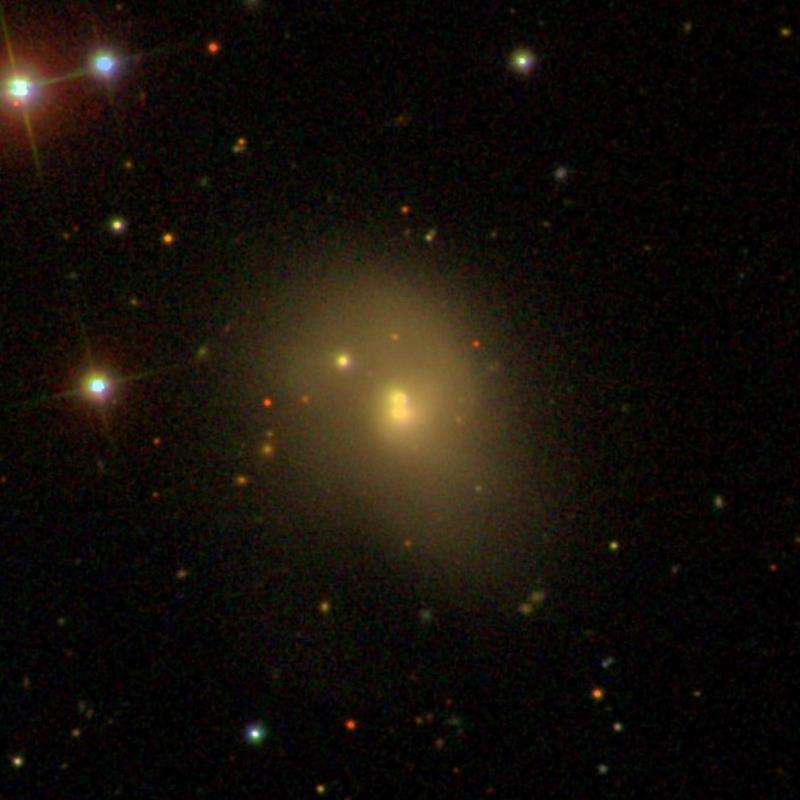

Observation data (J2000 epoch)
- Constellation: Pegasus
- Right ascension: 23^{h} 28^{m} 54.8752s^{s}
- Declination: +17° 18′ 33.509″″
- Redshift: 0.022846
- Heliocentric radial velocity: 6849 ± 17 km/s
- Distance: 326 ± 23 Mly (99.9 ± 7.0 Mpc)
- Apparent magnitude (V): 13.8

Characteristics
- Type: S0^0? edge-on
- Apparent size (V): 1.9′ × 1.1′

Other designations
- UGC 12620, CGCG 454-074, CGCG 2326.4+1703, MCG +03-59-063

NGC 7681 is a lenticular galaxy located in the constellation Pegasus. It was discovered on October 11, 1784 by the astronomer William Herschel.

== Galaxy group ==
NGC 7681 is the dominant member of a small, interacting group of galaxies known as the NGC 7681 group (or LGG 479). The group notably includes the Seyfert galaxies NGC 7679 and NGC 7682, which exhibit strong gravitational ties and tidal interactions with one another, alongside the smaller spiral galaxy UGC 12618.

== See also ==
- List of NGC objects (7000–7840)
- List of NGC objects
