= NGC 4476 =

Galaxy in the constellation of Virgo

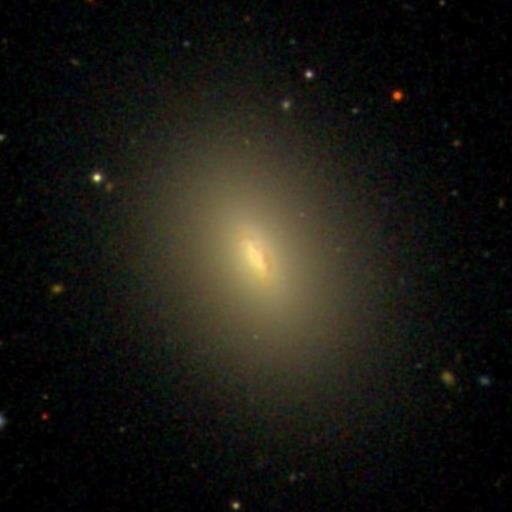
- SDSS image of NGC 4476

Observation data (J2000 epoch)
- Constellation: Virgo
- Right ascension: 12^{h} 29^{m} 59.1^{s}
- Declination: 12° 20′ 55″
- Redshift: 0.006565/1968 km/s
- Distance: 55.4 Mly
- Group or cluster: Virgo Cluster
- Apparent magnitude (V): 13.0

Characteristics
- Type: SA0^-(r)
- Size: ~31,000 ly (estimated)
- Apparent size (V): 1.67 x 1.14

Other designations
- CGCG 70-128, IRAS 12274+1237, MCG 2-32-96, PGC 41255, UGC 7637, VCC 1250

NGC 4476 is a lenticular galaxy located about 55 million light-years away in the constellation Virgo. NGC 4476 was discovered by astronomer William Herschel on April 12, 1784. The galaxy is a member of the Virgo Cluster.

== Dust disk ==
NGC 4476 has a highly inclined disk of dust that surrounds its nucleus.

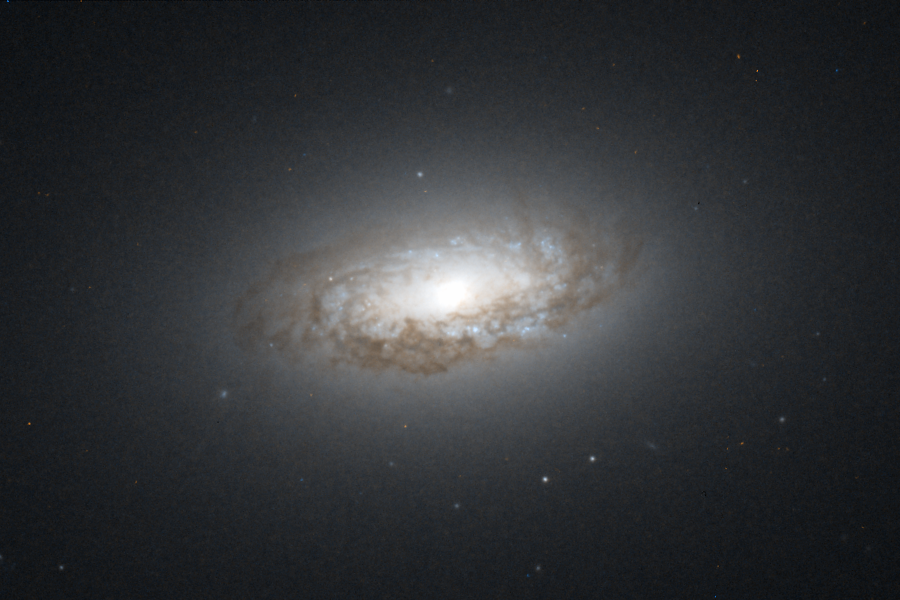
HST image of the dust disk in NGC 4476.

== Interstellar medium ==
NGC 4476 is extremely deficient in neutral atomic hydrogen (HI). This may have been caused by a tidal interaction with another galaxy or by ram-pressure stripping caused by the intracluster medium of the Virgo Cluster. Because NGC 4476 appears to lie close to Messier 87, there are many galaxies in its vicinity that may have interacted with it. However, optical images of the galaxy show no evidence of an interaction so this is unlikely to account for the deficiency in neutral atomic hydrogen.

It is more likely that the deficiency in neutral atomic hydrogen in NGC 4476 is due to ram-pressure stripping caused by the intracluster medium as it traveled on a highly radial orbit through the center of the Virgo Cluster. However, at the galaxy's projected distance from Messier 87, the observed ram-pressure stripping exerted on NGC 4476 is not sufficient to cause sufficient effects on the galaxy's interstellar medium. Surprisingly, there is an absence of H I in the inner regions of the galaxy. This may possibly suggest that the physical conditions of the ISM of NGC 4476 are very different from those of typical Virgo Cluster spirals.

== See also ==
- List of NGC objects (4001–5000)
- NGC 4478
