= NGC 7072 =

Spiral galaxy in the constellation Grus

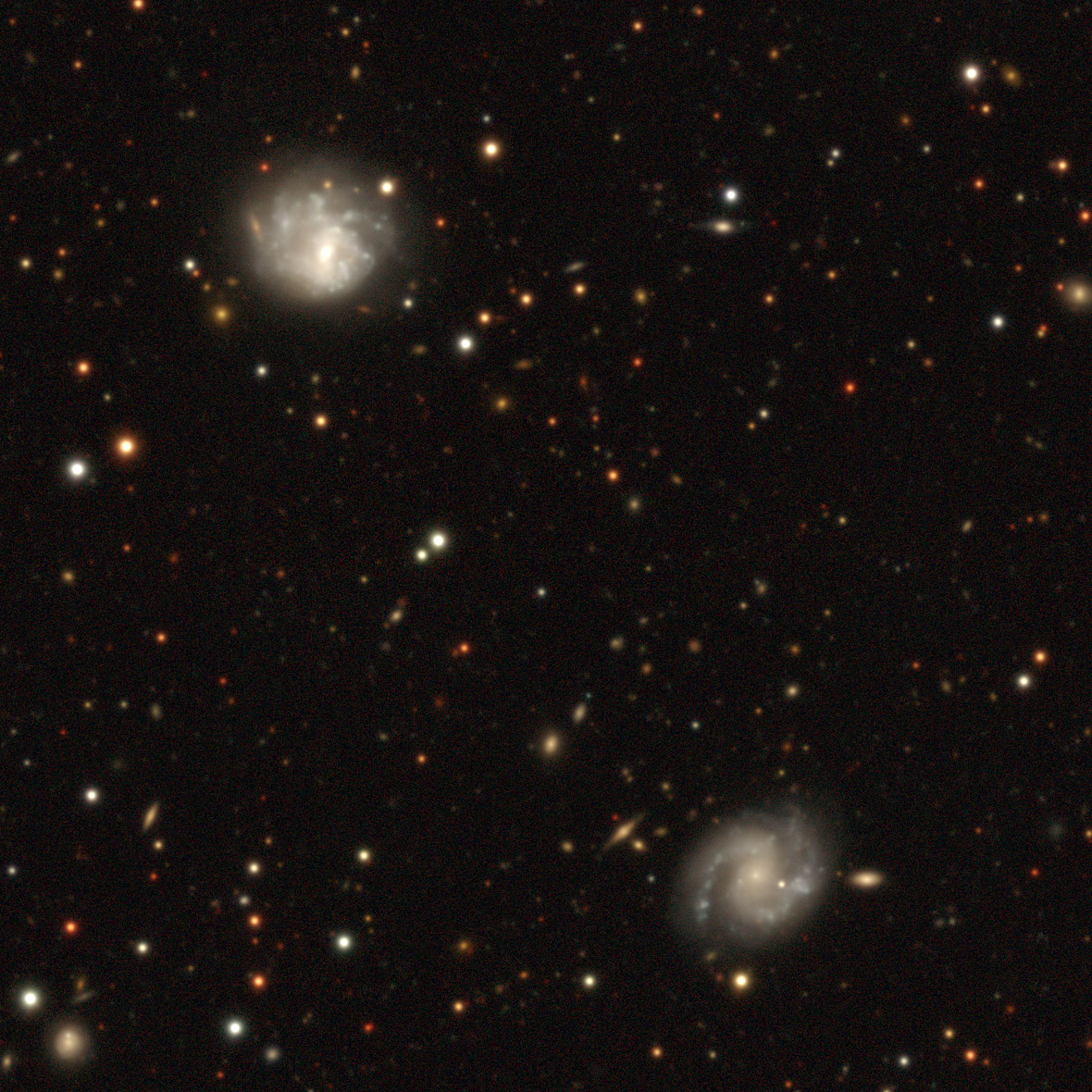
- legacy survey image of NGC 7072 (upper left) and NGC 7072A (lower right).

Observation data (J2000 epoch)
- Constellation: Grus
- Right ascension: 21^{h} 30^{m} 36.8797^{s}
- Declination: −43° 09′ 12.371″
- Redshift: 0.016538
- Heliocentric radial velocity: 4,958 km/s
- Distance: 211 Mly (64.8 Mpc)
- Apparent magnitude (V): 14.27

Characteristics
- Type: SAB(s)d
- Size: ~87,400 ly (26.79 kpc) (estimated)
- Apparent size (V): 0.9 x 0.7

Other designations
- ESO 287- G 031, IRAS 21273-4322, MCG -07-44-018, PGC 66874

NGC 7072 is an intermediate spiral galaxy located about 210 million light-years away in the constellation of Grus. NGC 7072 was discovered by astronomer John Herschel on September 5, 1834.

NGC 7072 is a member of the NGC 7060 group, a group of galaxies which contains six members, including NGC 7057, NGC 7060, NGC 7072, NGC 7072A, ESO 287-16, and ESO 287-26. However, according to A.M. Garcia, the galaxy is in the IC 5105 group (also known as LGG 445), which contains 19 members, including NGC 7057, NGC 7087, NGC 7060, NGC 7072, NGC 7075, NGC 7110, NGC 7130, plus four galaxies from the Index Catalogue and eight galaxies from the ESO catalog.

== Supernova ==
One supernova has been observed in NGC 7072: SN 2024yok (Type IIb, mag. 18.35) was discovered by GOTO on 20 October 2024.

== See also ==
- List of NGC objects (7001–7840)
