= NGC 7017 =

Galaxy in the constellation Capricornus

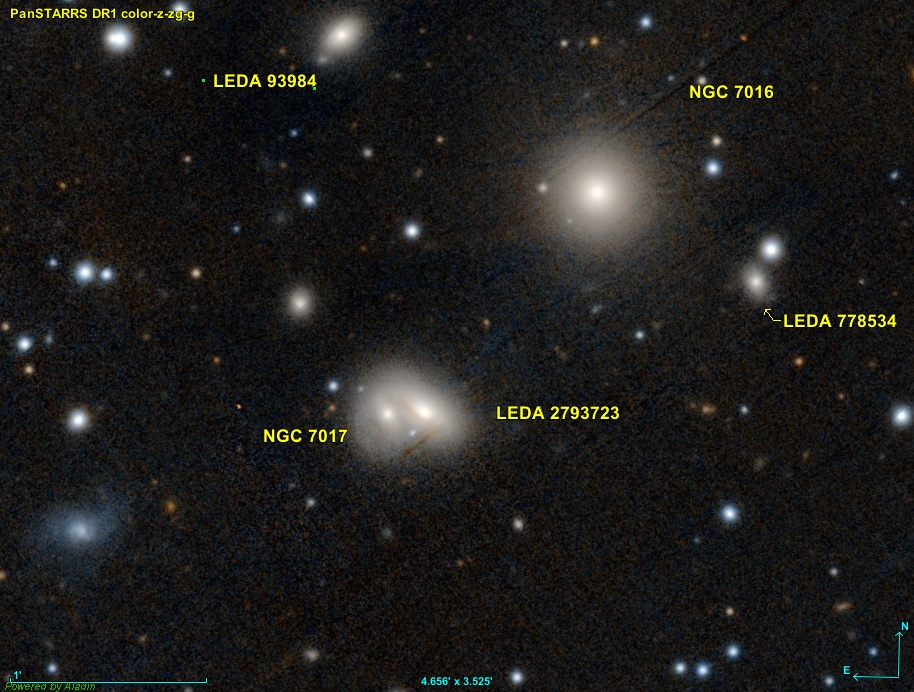
- NGC 7017 and surrounding galaxies

Observation data (J2000 epoch)
- Constellation: Capricornus
- Right ascension: 25^{h} 29^{m} 15^{s}
- Declination: −25° 29′ 15″
- Redshift: 0.03465
- Heliocentric radial velocity: 10387 km/s
- Distance: 200 million light-years
- Apparent magnitude (V): 14.4 to 15
- Absolute magnitude (B): 14

Characteristics
- Type: S0
- Size: ~470,000 ly (145 kpc) (estimated)
- Apparent size (V): 0.85 by 0.6 Arcminutes

Other designations
- ESO 529-26 MCG -4-49-14

NGC 7017 is a lenticular galaxy (S0) located in the direction of the constellation Capricornus. It has a declination of -25° 29' 15" and a right ascension of 21 hours, 07 minutes, and 20.5 seconds, and is estimated to be 455 million light-years from the Milky Way. The galaxy NGC 7017 was discovered alongside NGC 7016 on 8 Jul 1885 by Francis Leavenworth.

Supernova SN 2003gj was discovered in NGC 7017 on June 30, 2003, by M. Moore and W. Li as part of the LOTOSS program at the Lick Observatory. This supernova was of Type Ia and its magnitude at the time of discovery was 17.7.

== See also ==
- NGC 7016
- List of NGC Objects 7001-7840
