= NGC 7016 =

Galaxy in the constellation Capricornus

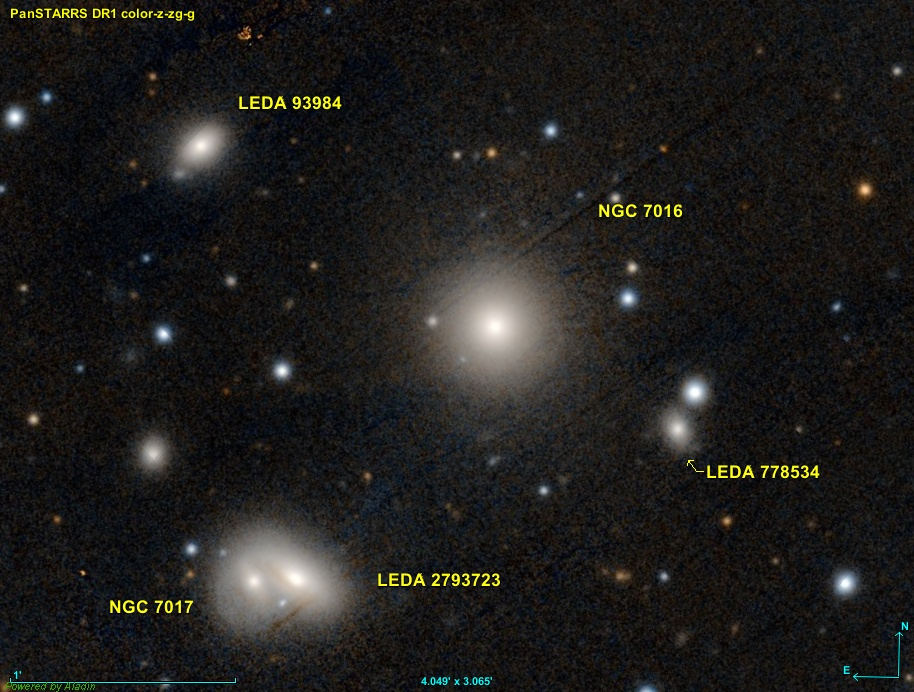
- The Elliptical galaxy NGC 7016.

Observation data (J2000 epoch)
- Constellation: Capricornus
- Right ascension: 21^{h} 07^{m} 16.3^{s}
- Declination: −25° 28′ 08″
- Redshift: 0.036845
- Heliocentric radial velocity: 11,046 km/s
- Distance: 480 Mly (147 Mpc)
- Apparent magnitude (V): 14.85
- Absolute magnitude (B): -22.97 ± 0.14

Characteristics
- Type: E0
- Size: ~157,400 ly (48.26 kpc) (estimated)
- Apparent size (V): 1.8 x 1.8

Other designations
- ESO 529-25, AM 2104-254, MCG -4-49-13, PRC C-58 PGC 66136

NGC 7016 is an elliptical galaxy located about 480 million light-years away from Earth in the constellation Capricornus. NGC 7016's calculated velocity is 11,046 km/s. The galaxy has an estimated diameter of about 160 thousand light years and was discovered by American astronomer Francis Preserved Leavenworth on July 8, 1885. It is also host to a supermassive black hole with an estimated mass of 1.4 billion M_{☉}.

== Physical characteristics ==
NGC 7016 is one of two prominent radio galaxies in the galaxy cluster Abell 3744 along with the double galaxy system NGC 7018. These two galaxies form a pair in the central region of the cluster Abell 3744.

NGC 7016 is a Famaroff-Riley type I radio galaxy, with bent asymmetric jets. Lower-resolution radio data obtained from observations from the VLA, show a very long, bent extension of the jet on the left side of the galaxy which forms a tendril structure. On the counterjet side there is extreme looping, forming a feature referred to as the “swirl.” It is thought that this swirl which runs into an X-ray cavity produced by NGC 7018, is the result of the jet colliding with the radio plasma from NGC 7018 and as a result of an interaction with a wake of gas left by the motion of NGC 7018 and its companion galaxy through the cluster.

== See also ==
- M87
- Elliptical galaxy
- NGC 7002
- List of NGC objects (7001–7840)
