= NGC 7004 =

Spiral galaxy in the constellation Indus

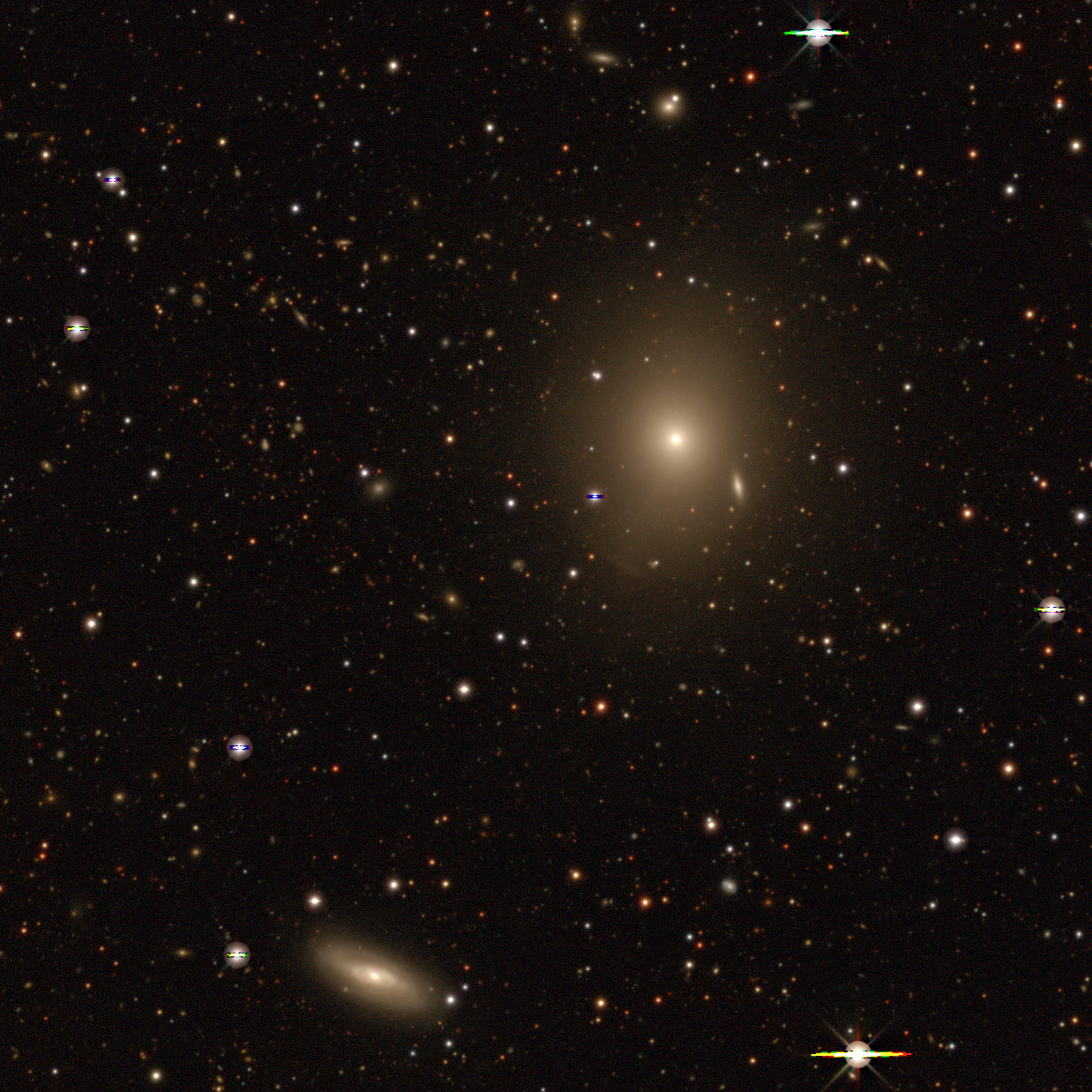
- NGC 7004 (bottom) and NGC 7002 (top) with legacy survey

Observation data (J2000 epoch)
- Constellation: Indus
- Right ascension: 21^{h} 04^{m} 02.2^{s}
- Declination: −49° 06′ 51″
- Redshift: 0.025284
- Heliocentric radial velocity: 7580 km/s
- Distance: 330 Mly (101 Mpc)
- Apparent magnitude (V): 13.8
- Absolute magnitude (B): -21.87 ± 0.09

Characteristics
- Type: (R')SAB0/a?(s)
- Size: ~139,500 ly (42.78 kpc) (estimated)
- Apparent size (V): 1.31× 0.44

Other designations
- ESO 235-46, FAIR 938, PGC 66019

NGC 7004 is a lenticular galaxy and a type 2 Seyfert galaxy around 330 million light-years away from Earth in the constellation Indus. NGC 7004 has an estimated diameter of 140,000 light-years. NGC 7004 was discovered by astronomer John Herschel on October 2, 1834. NGC 7004 is a member of a group of galaxies known as [T2015] nest 200093. The group contains 12 member galaxies including NGC 7002, has a velocity dispersion of 440 km/s and an estimated mass of 1.28 × 10^{14} M_{☉}. NGC 7004 is also host to a supermassive black hole with an estimated mass of 8.1 × 10^{8} M_{☉}.

== See also ==
- NGC 6861
- NGC 2787
- List of NGC objects (7001–7840)
