= HVGC-1 =

Hypervelocity globular cluster in the constellation Virgo

Observation data (J2000.0 epoch)
- Constellation: Virgo
- Right ascension: 12^{h} 30^{m} 54.70^{s}
- Declination: +12° 40′ 58.61″
- Distance: 54 Mly (16.5 Mpc)

Physical characteristics
- Metallicity: [Fe/H] = −0.9±0.3 dex
- Notable features: First discovered hypervelocity globular cluster
- Other designations: HVGC-1, H70848, M87 H70848

HVGC-1 is the first discovered hypervelocity globular cluster. Discovered in 2014, it was found escaping the supergiant elliptical galaxy Messier 87, in the Virgo Cluster. It is one of thousands of globular clusters found in M87. It is the first hypervelocity star cluster so far discovered. The globular is located at decimal degrees (RA, DEC) (187.72791°, +12.68295°).

== Properties ==
The object was observed to have an outlier velocity, ending with a determined radial velocity of −1026±13 km/s. In relation to M87, its velocity was determined to be 2100–2300 km/s. The cluster's velocity is so high that it will escape the Virgo Cluster as well.

The cluster's velocity is thought to originate by being ejected by the supermassive black hole at the center of M87, when the black hole stripped the outer layers of HVGC-1 off, it also ejected the remaining core with greater than escape velocity.
