= NGC 4486B =

Elliptical galaxy in the Virgo constellation

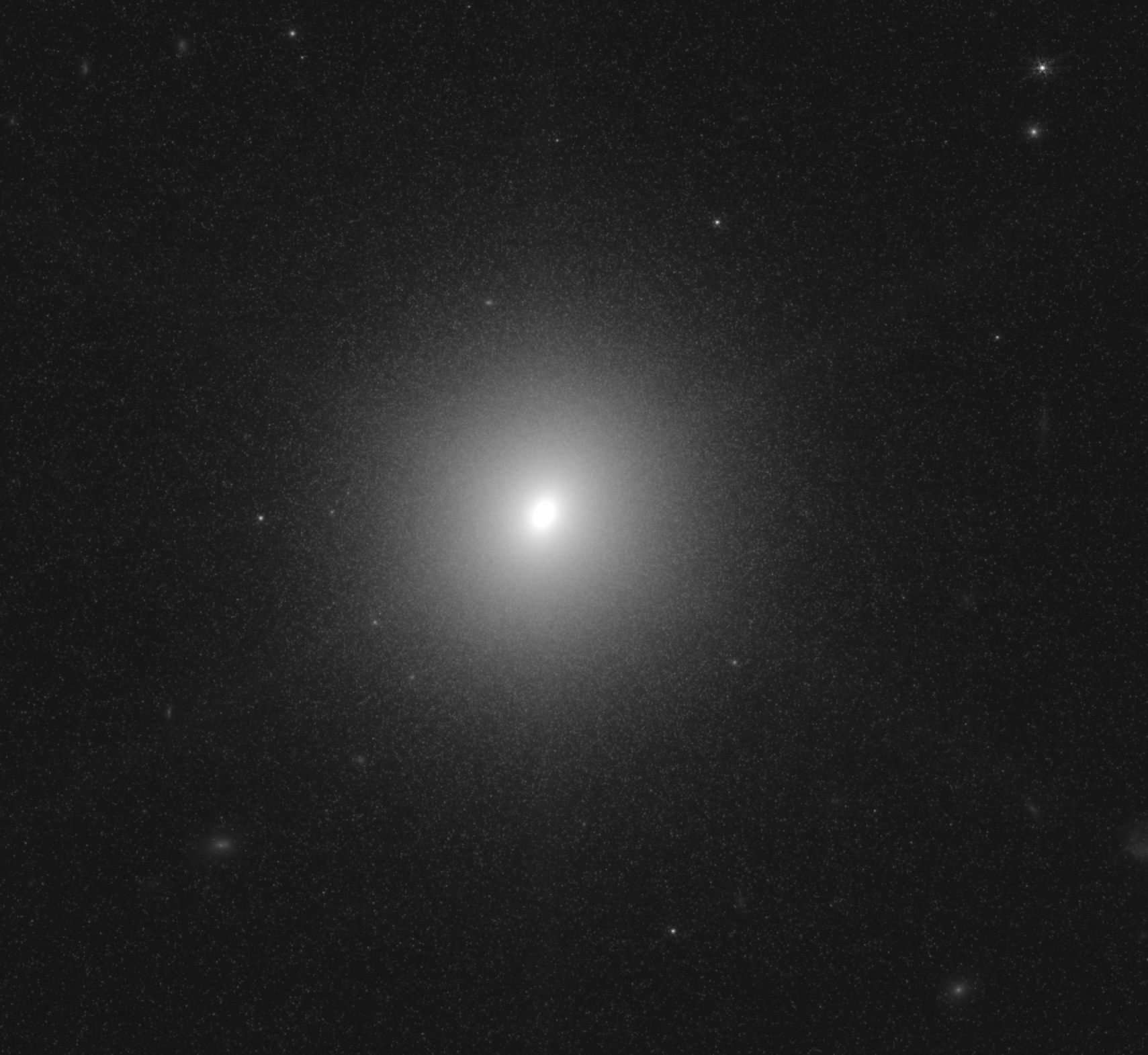
- Image of NGC 4486B with JWST NIRCam

Observation data (J2000 epoch)
- Constellation: Virgo
- Right ascension: 12h 31m 49s
- Declination: +12° 20’ 56”
- Absolute magnitude (B): 14.5
- magnitude (J): 11.01
- magnitude (H): 10.29
- magnitude (K): 10.09

Characteristics
- Type: Elliptical
- Mass: 6×10^8 M_{☉}
- Notable features: Overmassive black hole

NGC 4486b is an elliptical galaxy located in the constellation of Virgo. It is situated close to the equator and can be at least partially visible on both hemispheres of Earth. It is close to and orbits the much larger galaxy Messier 87 and it was probably altered by it.

This galaxy has a double galactic nucleus much like the Andromeda galaxy. The two nucleus have a separation of 0.15 or 12 parsecs. There is a supermassive black hole (SMBH) located inside NGC 4486b. This black hole has a mass of 500 million solar masses making it roughly one tenth of the mass of the entire galaxy. This makes the supermassive black hole within this galaxy overmassive.
