= NGC 7002 =

Galaxy in the constellation Indus

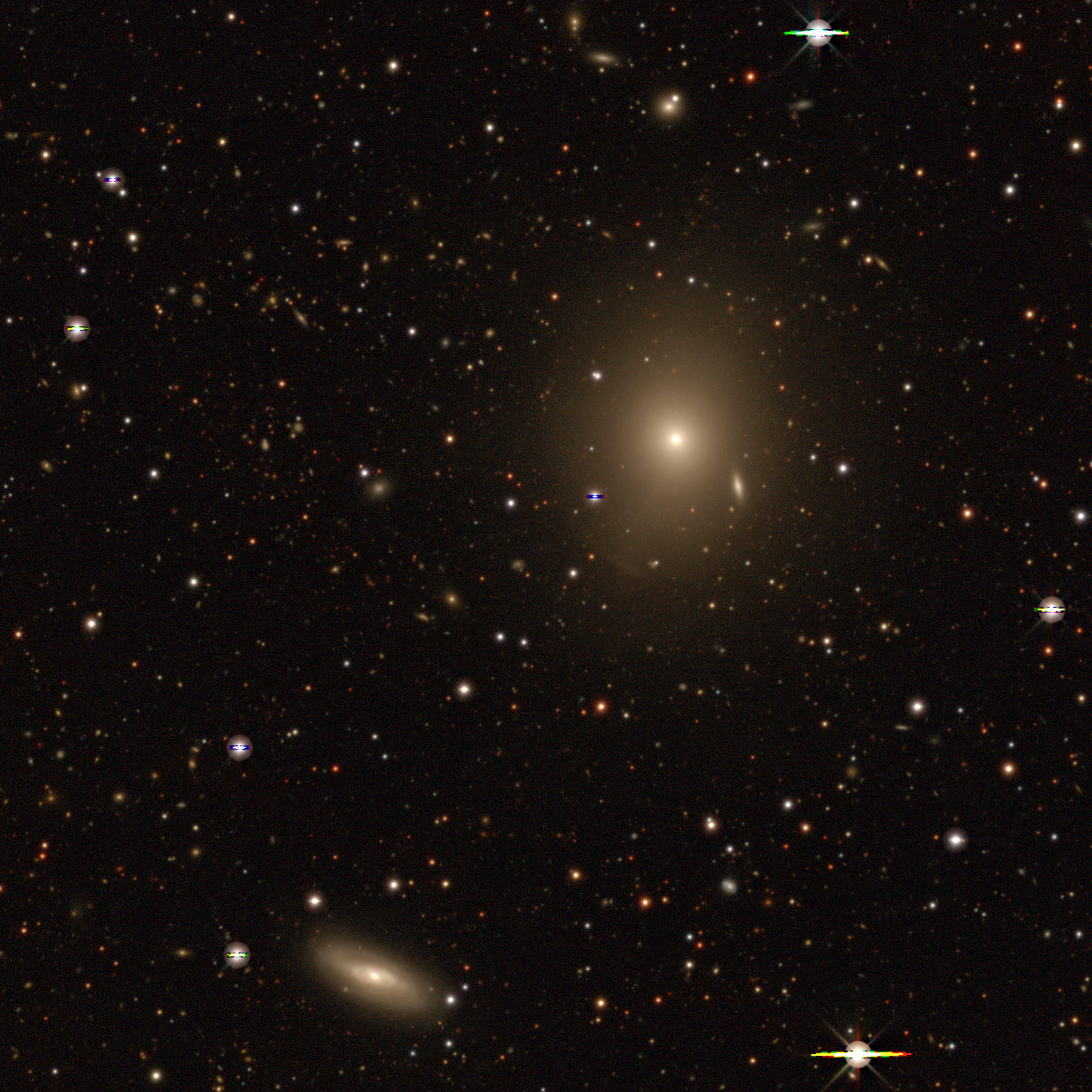
- NGC 7002 (top) and NGC 7004 (bottom) with legacy survey

Observation data (J2000 epoch)
- Constellation: Indus
- Right ascension: 21^{h} 03^{m} 44.8^{s}
- Declination: −49° 01′ 47″
- Redshift: 0.024520
- Heliocentric radial velocity: 7351 km/s
- Distance: 319 Mly (97.9 Mpc)
- Apparent magnitude (V): 13.46
- Absolute magnitude (B): -23.35 ± 0.58

Characteristics
- Type: E1 pec
- Size: ~175,000 ly (53.66 kpc) (estimated)
- Apparent size (V): 1.5 × 1.2

Other designations
- ESO 235-43, PGC 66009

NGC 7002 is a large elliptical galaxy, and a radio galaxy, around 320 million light-years away from Earth in the constellation of Indus. The galaxy was discovered by English astronomer John Herschel on September 30, 1834. NGC 7002 is the brightest member of a group of galaxies known as [T2015] nest 200093. The group contains 12 member galaxies including NGC 7004, has a velocity dispersion of 440 km/s and an estimated mass of 1.28 × 10^{14} M_{☉}. NGC 7002 is also host to a supermassive black hole with an estimated mass of 2.7 × 10^{9} M_{☉}.

== See also ==
- IC 1101, A massive elliptical galaxy which is also one of the largest known galaxies.
- M87, A large and famous large elliptical galaxy about 50 mly in the constellation Virgo.
- List of NGC objects (7001–7840)
