= NGC 7679 =

Galaxy in the constellation Pisces

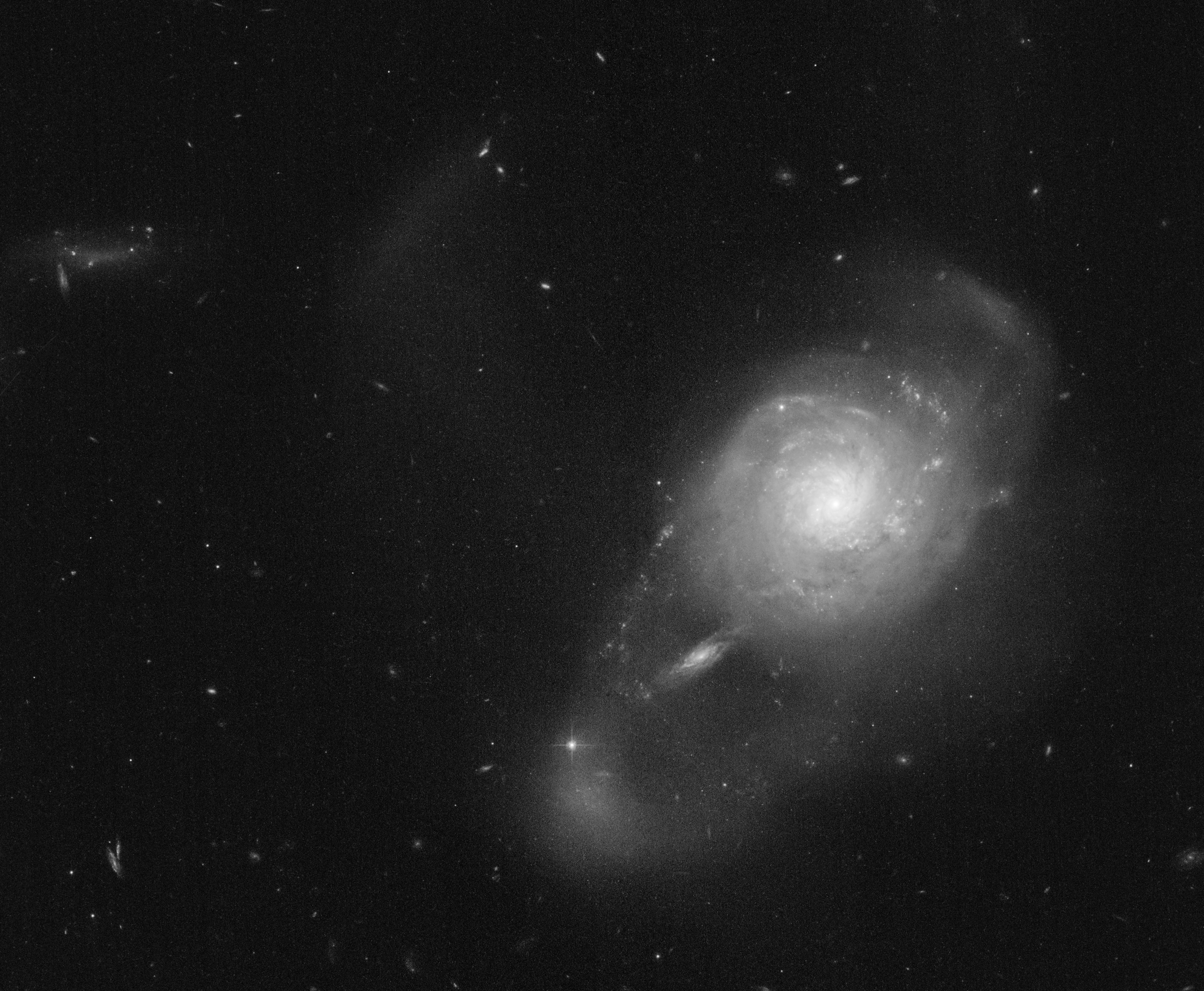
- Hubble Space Telescope (HST) image of the galaxy

Observation data (J2000 epoch)
- Constellation: Pisces
- Right ascension: 23^{h} 28^{m} 46.7^{s}
- Declination: +03° 30′ 41″
- Redshift: 0.017139 ± 0.000013
- Heliocentric radial velocity: 5,138 ± 4 km/s
- Distance: 191 ± 11 Mly (58.6 ± 3.3 Mpc)
- Apparent magnitude (V): 12.5

Characteristics
- Type: SB0 pec
- Apparent size (V): 1.3′ × 0.9′
- Notable features: Seyfert galaxy, starburst

Other designations
- Arp 216, UGC 12618, MCG +00-59-046, Mrk 534, PGC 71554, CGCG 380-061, VV 329

NGC 7679 is a lenticular galaxy with a peculiar morphology in the constellation Pisces. It is located at a distance of about 200 million light years from Earth, which, given its apparent dimensions, means that NGC 7679 is about 60,000 light years across. It was discovered by Heinrich d'Arrest on September 23, 1864. The total infrared luminosity is 10^{11.05} L_{☉}, and thus it is categorised as a luminous infrared galaxy. NGC 7679 is both a starburst galaxy and a Seyfert galaxy.

== Characteristics ==
NGC 7679 is a barred lenticular galaxy seen face on, and is noted for its distorted shape. The galaxy has two plumes in opposite directions, possibly the result of tidal interaction with NGC 7682, and smooth outer arms. The inner region is of high surface brightness with many knots and a high star formation rate. The star formation rate of the galaxy is estimated to be 80 M_{☉} per year based on the x-ray luminosity observed by XMM-Newton, and on the H-alpha luminosity of 21.2 ± 0.2 M_{☉} per year while observations in infrared indicate a star formation of 11.35 ± 0.6 M_{☉} per year.

There is evidence of massive starburst activity in the circumnuclear region, with 35% of the stars there being aged less than 10 million years. A ring of ionised gas dominates both the optical and infrared wavelengths and is the locus of the starburst activity.

=== Nucleus ===
The nucleus of NGC 7679 has been found to be active and has been categorised as a Seyfert galaxy. The most accepted theory for the energy source of Seyfert galaxies is the presence of an accretion disk around a supermassive black hole. NGC 7679 is believed to host a supermassive black hole whose mass is estimated to be 5.9×10^{6} (10^{6.77}) M_{☉} based on velocity dispersion.

The X-ray spectrum from BeppoSAX shows no significant absorption above 2 MeV and the iron Ka line was marginally detected. However, the galaxy shows signs of obstruction in visual light, as it lacks broad emission lines. Two possible reasons are the presence of dust or the accretion disk that produces X-rays is not obstructed but the broad line region is. The lack of X-ray absorption along with the presence of broad H-alpha lines but not broad H-beta mean that it cannot be easily categorised as a particular type of Seyfert galaxy.

== Nearby galaxies ==
NGC 7679 forms a pair with NGC 7682. NGC 7682 lies at a distance of 269.7 arcseconds, which corresponds to a projected distance of 97 kpc. The two galaxies are connected by a hydrogen bridge, a sign of a closer encounter in the past 500 million years. It is possible that the interaction of the two galaxies caused star formation in NGC 7679. A fainter galaxy has been found superimposed on the eastern arm of the galaxy, but it is actually located in the background.

== See also ==
- NGC 7130 - A similar active and starburst galaxy

== Gallery ==
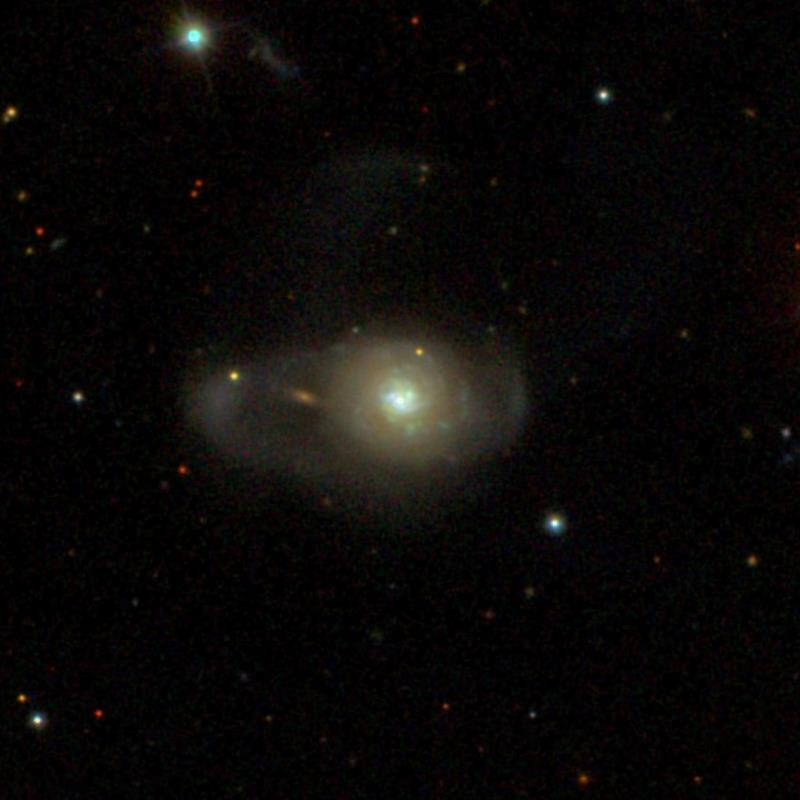
NGC 7679 (SDSS DR14)
