= NGC 7682 =

Barred spiral galaxy in the constellation Pisces

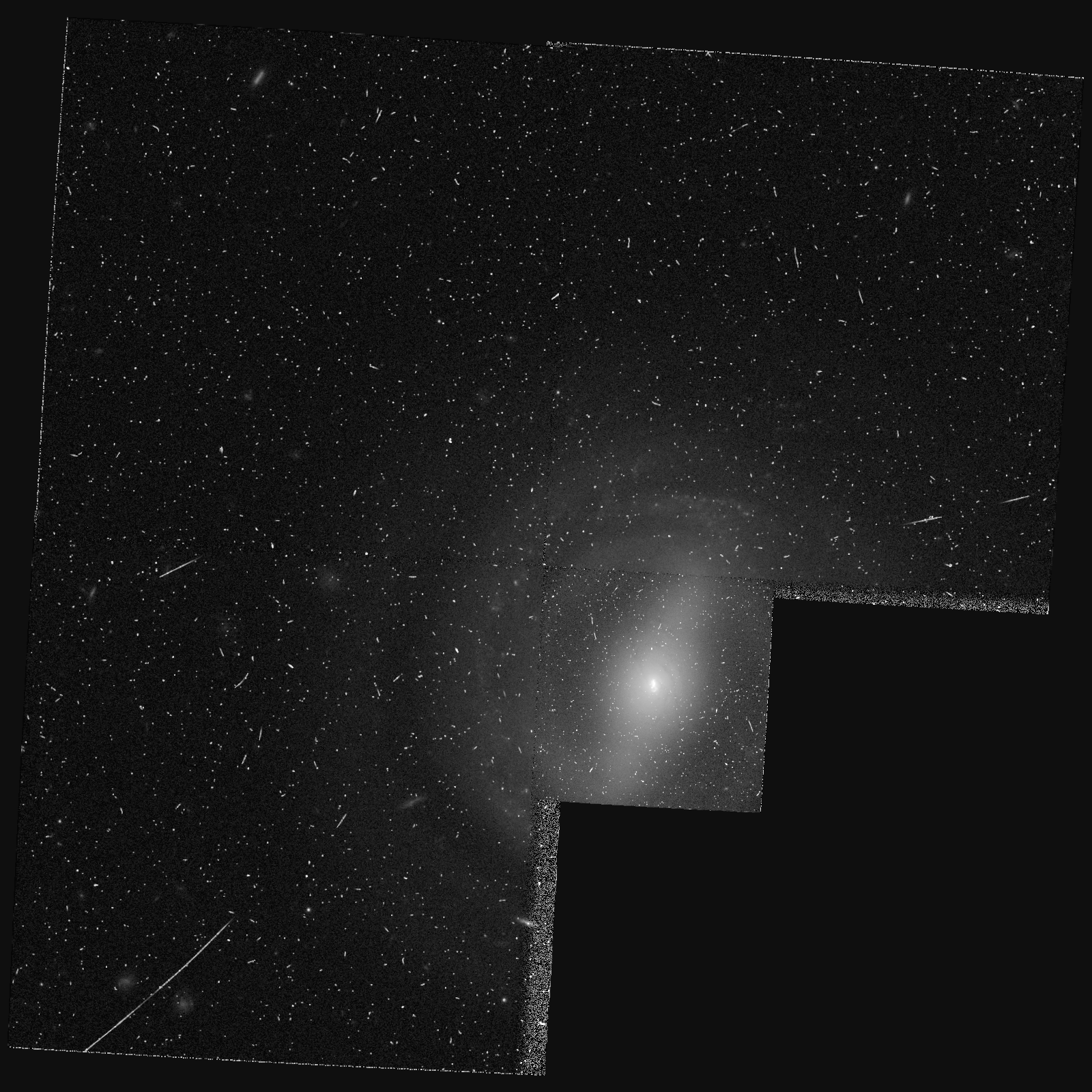
- Hubble Space Telescope (HST) image of the galaxy

Observation data (J2000 epoch)
- Constellation: Pisces
- Right ascension: 23^{h} 29^{m} 03.9^{s}
- Declination: +03° 32′ 00″
- Redshift: 0.017139 ± 0.000013
- Heliocentric radial velocity: 5,120 ± 4 km/s
- Distance: 177 ± 5 Mly (54.2 ± 1.5 Mpc)
- Apparent magnitude (V): 13.3

Characteristics
- Type: SB(r)ab
- Apparent size (V): 1.2′ × 1.1′
- Notable features: Seyfert galaxy

Other designations
- Arp 216, UGC 12622, MCG +00-59-047, PGC 71566, CGCG 380-062, VV 329b

NGC 7682 is a barred spiral galaxy in the constellation Pisces. It is located at a distance of about 180 million light years from Earth, which, given its apparent dimensions, means that NGC 7682 is about 65,000 light years across. It was discovered by Heinrich d'Arrest on September 23, 1864.

The galaxy has a bar and two weak spiral arms which form a ring. The nucleus of NGC 7682 has been found to be active and has been categorised as a type 2 Seyfert galaxy. The most accepted theory for the energy source of Seyfert galaxies is the presence of an accretion disk around a supermassive black hole. The supermassive hole in the nucleus of NGC 7682 is estimated to be 17–62 million (10^{7.56±0.33}) M_{☉}. Ionised H-alpha, [N II] and [O III] gas has been detected along with [Ne V], [Si VI] and [Si VIII]. Ionization cones are observed north and south of the nucleus. A jet was reported to be present in H-alpha and NII imaging by W. C. Keel in 1985 but further observations didn't confirm its presence.

NGC 7682 forms an interacting pair with NGC 7679. NGC 7682 lies at a distance of 269.7 arcseconds, which corresponds to a projected distance of 97 kpc. The two galaxies are connected by a hydrogen bridge, a sign of a closer encounter in the past 500 million years. It is possible that the interaction of the two galaxies caused star formation in NGC 7679.
