= NGC 7057 =

Galaxy in the constellation Microscopium

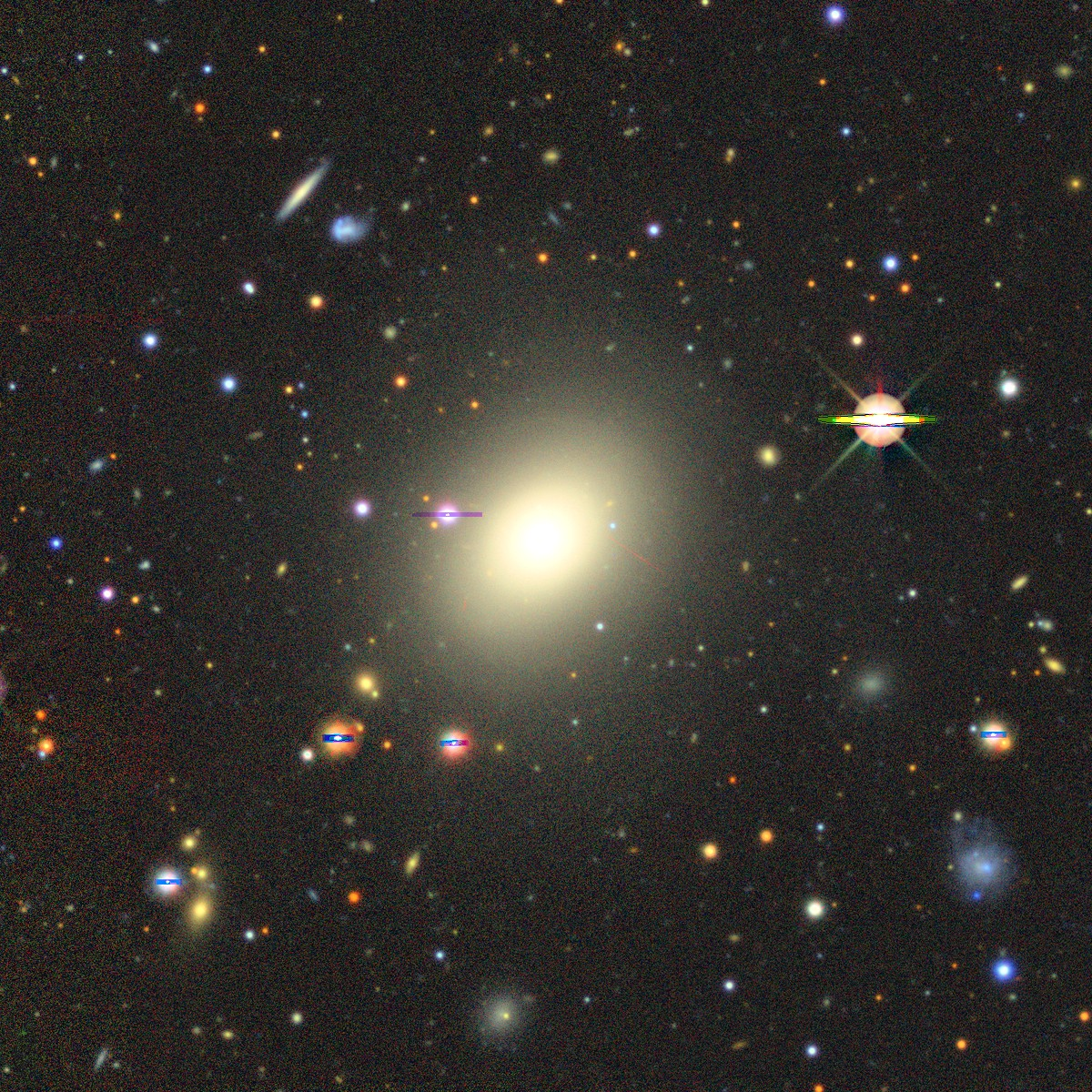
- NGC 7057 imaged by Legacy Surveys

Observation data (J2000 epoch)
- Constellation: Microscopium
- Right ascension: 21^{h} 24^{m} 58.7^{s}
- Declination: −42° 27′ 38″
- Redshift: 0.017962
- Heliocentric radial velocity: 5,385 km/s
- Distance: 230.1 Mly
- Apparent magnitude (V): 12.60

Characteristics
- Type: E
- Apparent size (V): 1.4 x 1.0

Other designations
- ESO 287-17, AM 2121-424, MCG -7-44-4, PGC 66708

NGC 7057 is an elliptical galaxy located about 230 million light-years away in the constellation of Microscopium. NGC 7057 was discovered by astronomer John Herschel on September 2, 1836.

== Group membership ==
NGC 7057 is a member of a group of galaxies known as the NGC 7060 group. Other members of the group are NGC 7060, NGC 7072 and NGC 7072A.

== See also ==
- List of NGC objects (7001–7840)
- NGC 7302
