= NGC 7060 =

Galaxy in the constellation Microscopium

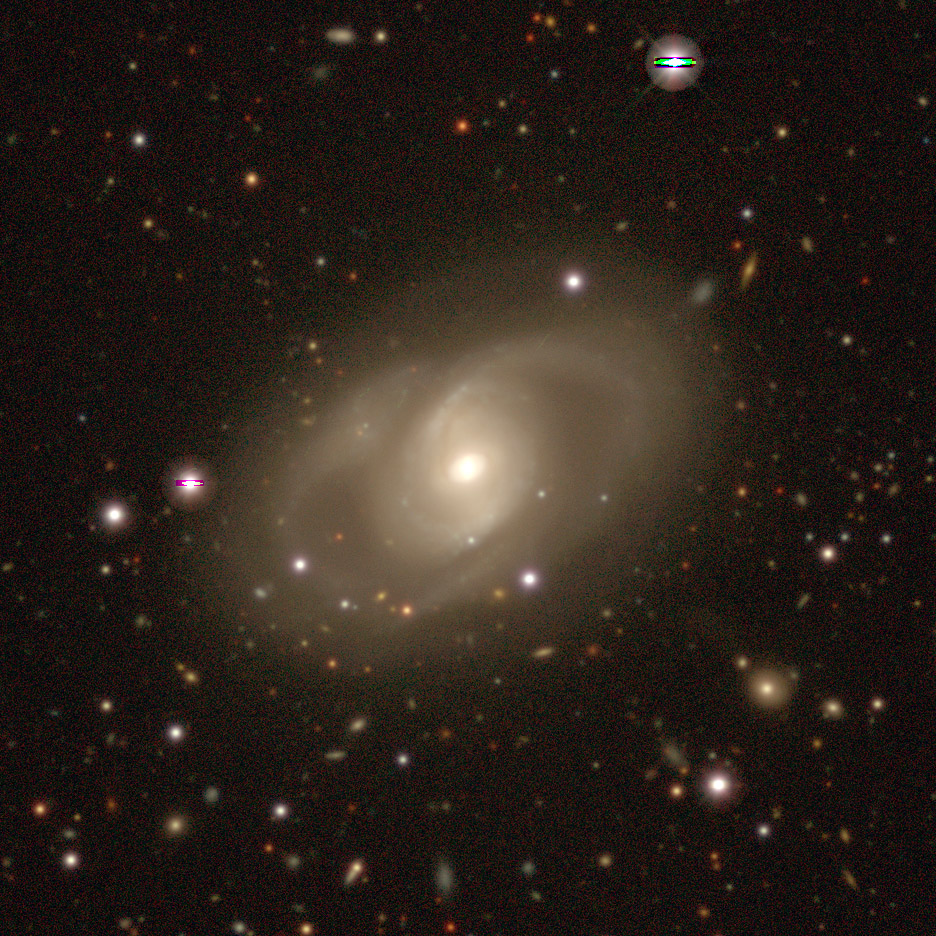
- The galaxy NGC 7060.

Observation data (J2000 epoch)
- Constellation: Microscopium
- Right ascension: 21^{h} 25^{m} 53.6^{s}
- Declination: −42° 24′ 41″
- Redshift: 0.016044
- Heliocentric radial velocity: 4,810 km/s
- Distance: 205 Mly
- Apparent magnitude (V): 13.74

Characteristics
- Type: (R')SAB(r)a
- Apparent size (V): 1.7 x 0.9

Other designations
- ESO 287-22, AM 2122-423, IRAS 21226-4237, MCG -7-44-6, PGC 66732

NGC 7060 is an intermediate spiral galaxy located about 200 million light-years away in the constellation of Microscopium. The spiral arms of NGC 7060 appear to overlap. NGC 7060 was discovered by astronomer John Herschel on September 2, 1836.

NGC 7060 is the dominant member of a small group of galaxies known as the NGC 7060 group. Other members of the group are NGC 7057, NGC 7072, and NGC 7072A.

== See also ==
- List of NGC objects (7001–7840)
