= Messier 87 =

Galaxy in the constellation Virgo

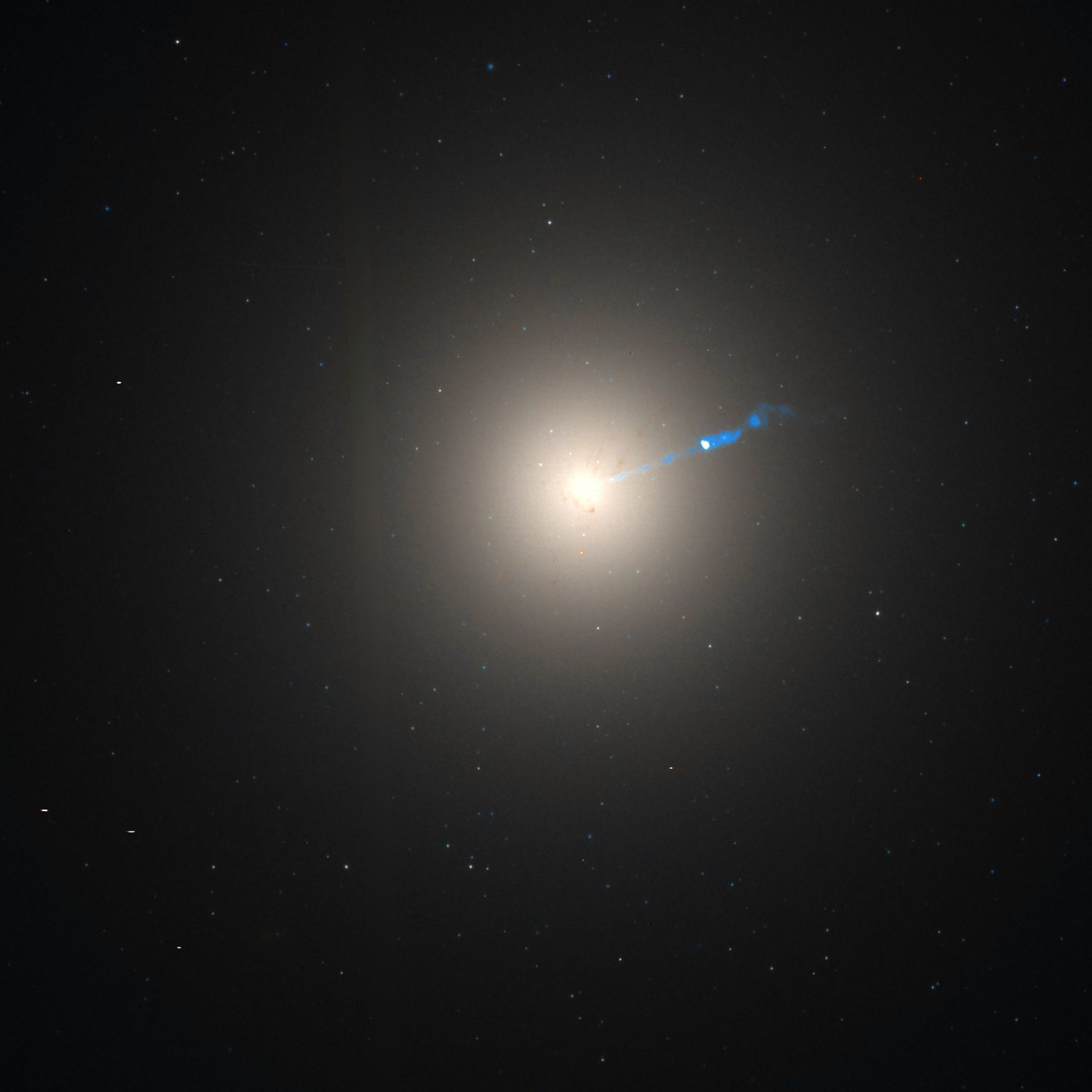
- Messier 87, with the blue plasma jet of its galactic core clearly visible (composite image of observations by the Hubble Space Telescope in visible and infrared light)

Observation data (J2000 epoch)
- Constellation: Virgo
- Right ascension: 12^{h} 30^{m} 49.42338^{s}
- Declination: +12° 23′ 28.0439″
- Redshift: 0.00428 ± 0.00002
- Heliocentric radial velocity: 1,284 ± 5 km/s
- Distance: 16.4 ± 0.5 Mpc (53.5 ± 1.6 Mly)
- Apparent magnitude (V): 8.6

Characteristics
- Type: E+0-1 pec, NLRG Sy
- Size: 40.55 kpc × 32.19 kpc (132,000 ly × 105,000 ly) (diameter; 25.0 mag/arcsec^{2} B-band isophote) (Note: Size quoted refers to the diameter directly measured by the 25.0 mag/arcsec^{2} isophote at the B-band. The galaxy has a much more diffuse and extensive halo extending up to 300 kpc (980,000 ly).)
- Apparent size (V): 7.2 × 6.8 arcmin

Other designations
- Virgo A, Virgo X-1, NGC 4486, UGC 7654, PGC 41361, VCC 1316, Arp 152, 3C 274, 3U 1228+12.

Messier 87 (also known as Virgo A or NGC 4486, generally abbreviated to M87) is a supergiant elliptical galaxy in the constellation Virgo that contains several trillion stars. One of the largest and most massive galaxies in the local universe, (Note: "Local universe" is not a strictly defined term, but it is often taken as that part of the universe out to distances between about 50 million to a billion light-years.) it has a large population of globular clusters—about 15,000 compared with the 150–200 orbiting the Milky Way—and a jet of energetic plasma that originates at the core and extends at least 1,500 parsecs (4,900 light-years), traveling at a relativistic speed. It is one of the brightest radio sources in the sky and a popular target for both amateur and professional astronomers.

The French astronomer Charles Messier discovered M87 in 1781, and cataloged it as a nebula. M87 is about 16.4 million parsecs (53 million light-years) from Earth and is the second-brightest galaxy within the northern Virgo Cluster, having many satellite galaxies. Unlike a disk-shaped spiral galaxy, M87 has no distinctive dust lanes. Instead, it has an almost featureless, ellipsoidal shape typical of most giant elliptical galaxies, diminishing in luminosity with distance from the center. Forming around one-sixth of its mass, M87's stars have a nearly spherically symmetric distribution. Their population density decreases with increasing distance from the core. It has an active supermassive black hole at its core, which forms the primary component of an active galactic nucleus. The black hole was imaged using data collected in 2017 by the Event Horizon Telescope (EHT), with a final, processed image released on 10 April 2019. In March 2021, the EHT Collaboration presented, for the first time, a polarized-based image of the black hole which may help better reveal the forces giving rise to quasars.

The galaxy is a strong source of multi-wavelength radiation, particularly radio waves. It has an isophotal diameter of 40.55 kiloparsecs (132,000 light-years), with a diffuse galactic envelope that extends to a radius of about 150 kiloparsecs (490,000 light-years), where it is truncated—possibly by an encounter with another galaxy. Its interstellar medium consists of diffuse gas enriched by elements emitted from evolved stars.

== Observation history ==
In 1781, the French astronomer Charles Messier published a catalogue of 103 objects that had a nebulous appearance as part of a list intended to identify objects that might otherwise be confused with comets. In subsequent use, each catalogue entry was prefixed with an "M". Thus, M87 was the eighty-seventh object listed in Messier's catalogue. During the 1880s, the object was included as NGC 4486 in the New General Catalogue of nebulae and star clusters assembled by the Danish-Irish astronomer John Dreyer, which he based primarily on the observations of the English astronomer John Herschel.

In 1918, the American astronomer Heber Curtis of Lick Observatory noted M87's lack of a spiral structure and observed a "curious straight ray ... apparently connected with the nucleus by a thin line of matter." The ray appeared brightest near the galactic center. In January 1922, Russian astronomer Innokentii A. Balanowski discovered supernova SN 1919A (type unknown, mag. 11.5) on a photographic plate of M87 that had been taken on 22 February 1919.

=== Identification as a galaxy ===
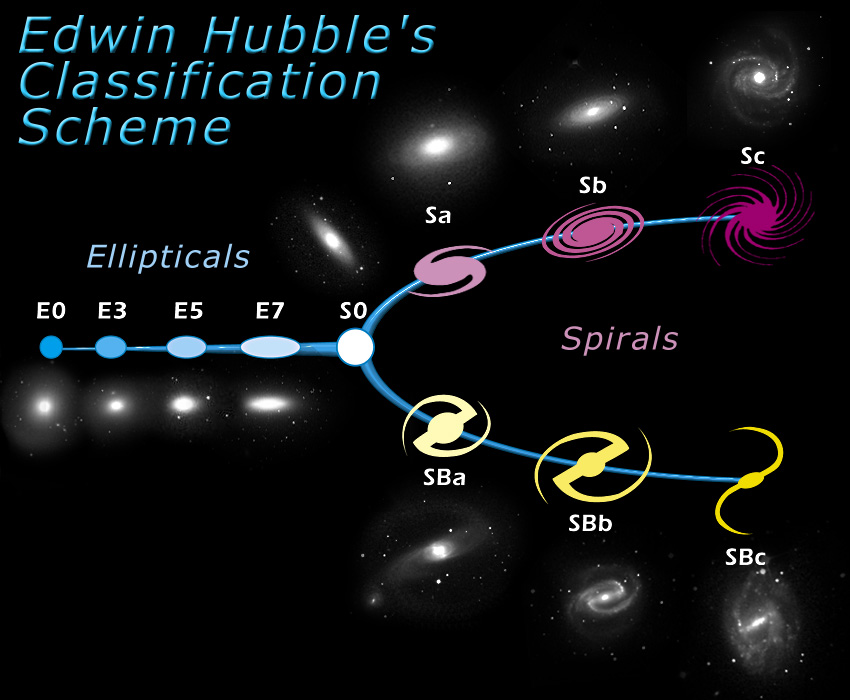
In Hubble's galaxy classification scheme, M87 is an E0 galaxy.

In 1922, the American astronomer Edwin Hubble categorized M87 as one of the brighter globular nebulae, as it lacked any spiral structure, but like spiral nebulae, appeared to belong to the family of non-galactic nebulae. In 1926, he produced a new categorization, distinguishing extragalactic from galactic nebulae, the former being independent star systems. M87 was classified as a type of elliptical extragalactic nebula with no apparent elongation (class E0).

In 1931, Hubble described M87 as a member of the Virgo Cluster, and gave a provisional estimate of 1.8 million parsecs (5.9 million light-years) from Earth. It was then the only known elliptical nebula for which individual stars could be resolved, although it was pointed out that globular clusters would be indistinguishable from individual stars at such distances. In his 1936 The Realm of the Nebulae, Hubble examines the terminology of the day; some astronomers labeled extragalactic nebulae as external galaxies on the basis that they were stellar systems at far distances from our own galaxy, while others preferred the conventional term extragalactic nebulae, as galaxy was at that time a synonym for the Milky Way. M87 continued to be labelled as an extragalactic nebula at least until 1954.

=== Modern research ===
In 1947, a prominent radio source, Virgo A, was identified with errors in its measured position that overlapped the location of M87. The source was confirmed to be M87 by 1953, and the linear relativistic jet emerging from the core of the galaxy was suggested as the cause. This jet extended from the core at a position angle of 260° to an angular distance of 20″ with an angular width of 2″. In 1969–1970, a strong component of the radio emission was found to closely align with the optical source of the jet. In 1966, the United States Naval Research Laboratory's Aerobee 150 rocket identified Virgo X-1, the first X-ray source in Virgo. The Aerobee rocket launched from White Sands Missile Range on 7 July 1967 yielded further evidence that the source of Virgo X-1 was the radio galaxy M87. Subsequent X-ray observations by the HEAO 1 and Einstein Observatory showed a complex source that included the active galactic nucleus of M87. However, there is little central concentration of the X-ray emission.

M87 has been an important testing ground for techniques that measure the masses of central supermassive black holes in galaxies. In 1978, stellar-dynamical modeling of the mass distribution in M87 gave evidence for a central mass of five billion solar masses. After the installation of the COSTAR corrective-optics module in the Hubble Space Telescope in 1993, the Hubble Faint Object Spectrograph (FOS) was used to measure the rotation velocity of the ionized gas disk at the center of M87, as an "early release observation" designed to test the scientific performance of the post-repair Hubble instruments. The FOS data indicated a central black hole mass of 2.4 billion M_{☉}, with 30% uncertainty. Globular clusters within M87 have been used to calibrate metallicity relations as well.

M87 was observed by the Event Horizon Telescope (EHT) during much of 2017. (Note: "[whole issue]". Astrophysical Journal Letters. 875 (1). 10 April 2019. was dedicated to the results, published six open-access papers.) The event horizon of the black hole at the center was directly imaged by the EHT, then revealed in a press conference on the issue date stated, filtering out from this the first image of a black hole's shadow.

== Visibility ==
Area in constellation Virgo around M87

M87 is near a high declination limit of the Virgo constellation, abutting Coma Berenices. It lies along the line between the stars Epsilon Virginis and Denebola (Beta Leonis). (Note: Epsilon Virginis is at celestial coordinates α=13ʰ02ᵐ, δ=+10°57′; Denebola is at α=11ʰ49ᵐ, δ=+14°34′. The midpoint of the pair is at α=12ʰ16ᵐ, δ=12°45′. Compare to the coordinates of Messier 87: α=12ʰ31ᵐ, δ=+12°23′ .) The galaxy can be observed using a small telescope with a 6 cm (2.4 in) aperture, extending across an angular area of 7.2 × 6.8 arcminutes at a surface brightness of 12.9, with a very bright, 45 arcsecond core. Viewing the jet is a challenge without the aid of photography. Before 1991, astronomer Otto Struve was the only person known to have seen the jet visually, using the 254 cm (100 in) Hooker telescope. In more recent years it has been observed in larger amateur telescopes under excellent conditions.

== Properties ==
In the modified Hubble sequence scheme for galaxy morphological classification by the French astronomer Gérard de Vaucouleurs, M87 is categorized as an E0p galaxy. "E0" designates an elliptical galaxy that displays no flattening, which is to say, it appears spherical. A "p" suffix indicates a peculiar galaxy that does not fit cleanly into the classification scheme; in this case, the peculiarity is the presence of the jet emerging from the core. In the Yerkes (Morgan) scheme, M87 is classified as a type-cD galaxy. A D galaxy has an elliptical-like nucleus surrounded by an extensive, dustless, diffuse envelope. A D type supergiant is called a cD galaxy.

The distance to M87 has been estimated using several independent techniques. These include measurement of the luminosity of planetary nebulae, comparison with nearby galaxies whose distance is estimated using standard candles such as cepheid variables, the linear size distribution of globular clusters, (Note: This yields a distance of 16.4 ± 2.3 megaparsecs (53.5 ± 7.50 million light-years).) and the tip of the red-giant branch method using individually resolved red giant stars. (Note: This yields a distance of 16.7 ± 0.9 megaparsecs (54.5 ± 2.94 million light-years).) These measurements are consistent with each other, and their weighted average yields a distance estimate of 16.4 ± 0.5 megaparsecs (53.5 ± 1.63 million light-years).

Enclosed mass
Radius kpc	Mass ×10^{12} M_{☉}
32	2.4
44	3.0
47	5.7
50	6.0

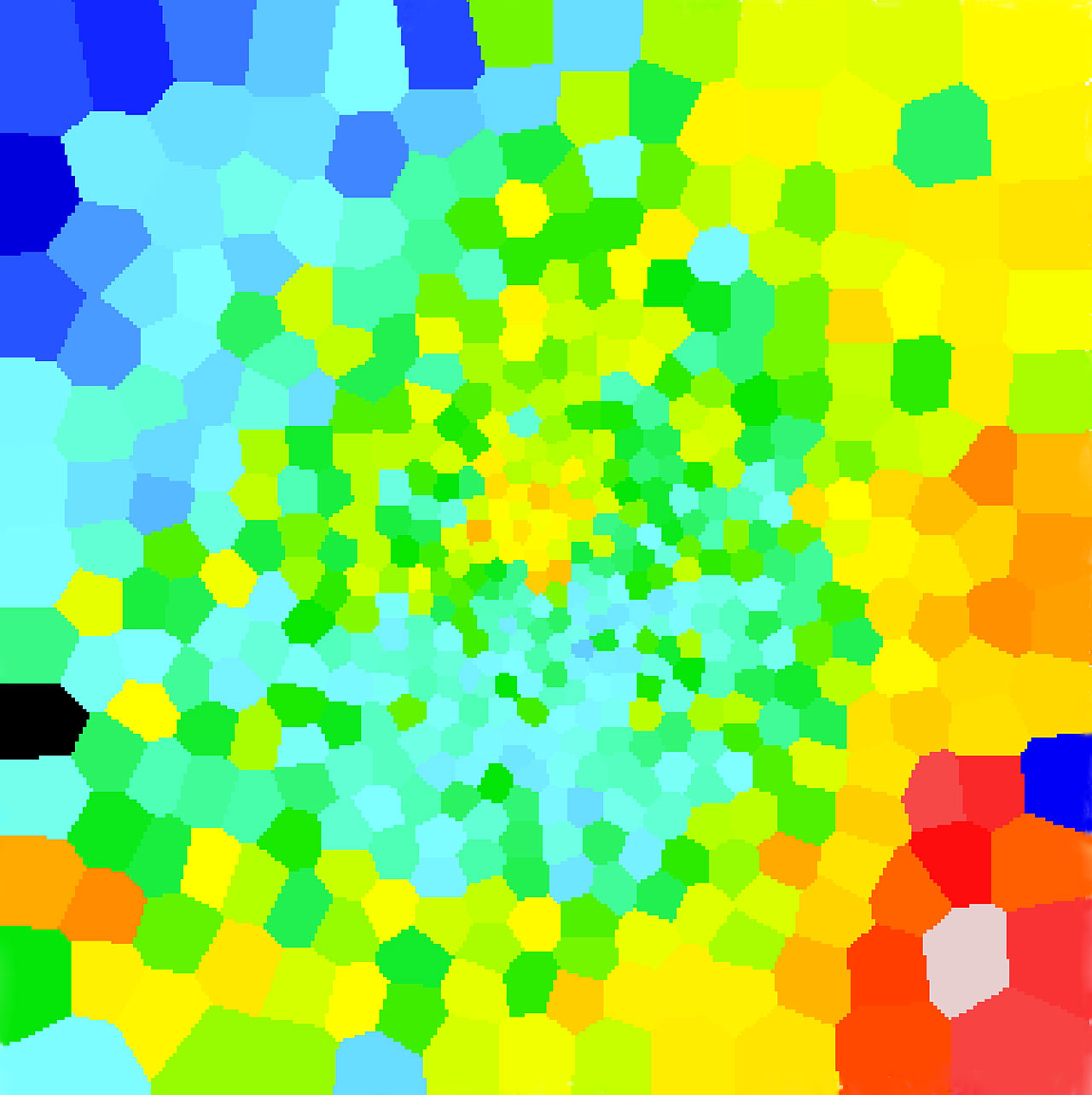
Stellar velocity map of the central region of M87, showing the motion of stars relative to Earth: away towards The image shows a slight rotation in the vertical plane (the lower right moving away from earth, the upper left moving towards), showing that M87 is rotating slowly.

M87 is one of the most massive galaxies in the local Universe. Its diameter is estimated at 132,000 light-years, which is approximately 51% larger than that of the Milky Way. As an elliptical galaxy, the galaxy is a spheroid rather than a flattened disc, accounting for the substantially larger mass of M87. Within a radius of 32 kiloparsecs (100,000 light-years), the mass is (2.4±0.6)×10^{12} times the mass of the Sun, which is double the mass of the Milky Way galaxy. As with other galaxies, only a fraction of this mass is in the form of stars: M87 has an estimated mass to luminosity ratio of 6.3 ± 0.8; that is, only about one part in six of the galaxy's mass is in the form of stars that radiate energy. This ratio varies from 5 to 30, approximately in proportion to r^{1.7} in the region of 9–40 kiloparsecs (29,000–130,000 light-years) from the core. The total mass of M87 may be 200 times that of the Milky Way.

The galaxy experiences an infall of gas at the rate of two to three solar masses per year, most of which may be accreted onto the core region. The extended stellar envelope of this galaxy reaches a radius of about 150 kiloparsecs (490,000 light-years), compared with about 100 kiloparsecs (330,000 light-years) for the Milky Way. Beyond that distance the outer edge of the galaxy has been truncated by some means; possibly by an earlier encounter with another galaxy. There is evidence of linear streams of stars to the northwest of the galaxy, which may have been created by tidal stripping of orbiting galaxies or by small satellite galaxies falling in toward M87. Moreover, a filament of hot, ionized gas in the northeastern outer part of the galaxy may be the remnant of a small, gas-rich galaxy that was disrupted by M87 and could be feeding its active nucleus. M87 is estimated to have at least 50 satellite galaxies, including NGC 4486B and NGC 4478.

The spectrum of the nuclear region of M87 shows the emission lines of various ions, including hydrogen (HI, HII), helium (HeI), oxygen (OI, OII, OIII), nitrogen (NI), magnesium (MgII), and sulfur (SII). The line intensities for weakly ionized atoms (such as neutral atomic oxygen, OI) are stronger than those of strongly ionized atoms (such as doubly ionized oxygen, OIII). A galactic nucleus with such spectral properties is termed a LINER, for "low-ionization nuclear emission-line region". The mechanism and source of weak-line-dominated ionization in LINERs and M87 are under debate. Possible causes include shock-induced excitation in the outer parts of the disk or photoionization in the inner region powered by the jet.

Elliptical galaxies such as M87 are believed to form as the result of one or more mergers of smaller galaxies. They generally contain relatively little cold interstellar gas (in comparison with spiral galaxies) and they are populated mostly by old stars, with little or no ongoing star formation. M87's elliptical shape is maintained by the random orbital motions of its constituent stars, in contrast to the more orderly rotational motions found in a spiral galaxy such as the Milky Way. Using the Very Large Telescope to study the motions of about 300 planetary nebulae, astronomers have determined that M87 absorbed a medium-sized star-forming spiral galaxy over the last billion years. This has resulted in the addition of some younger, bluer stars to M87. The distinctive spectral properties of the planetary nebulae allowed astronomers to discover a chevron-like structure in M87's halo which was produced by the incomplete phase-space mixing of a disrupted galaxy.

== Components ==
=== Supermassive black hole M87* ===
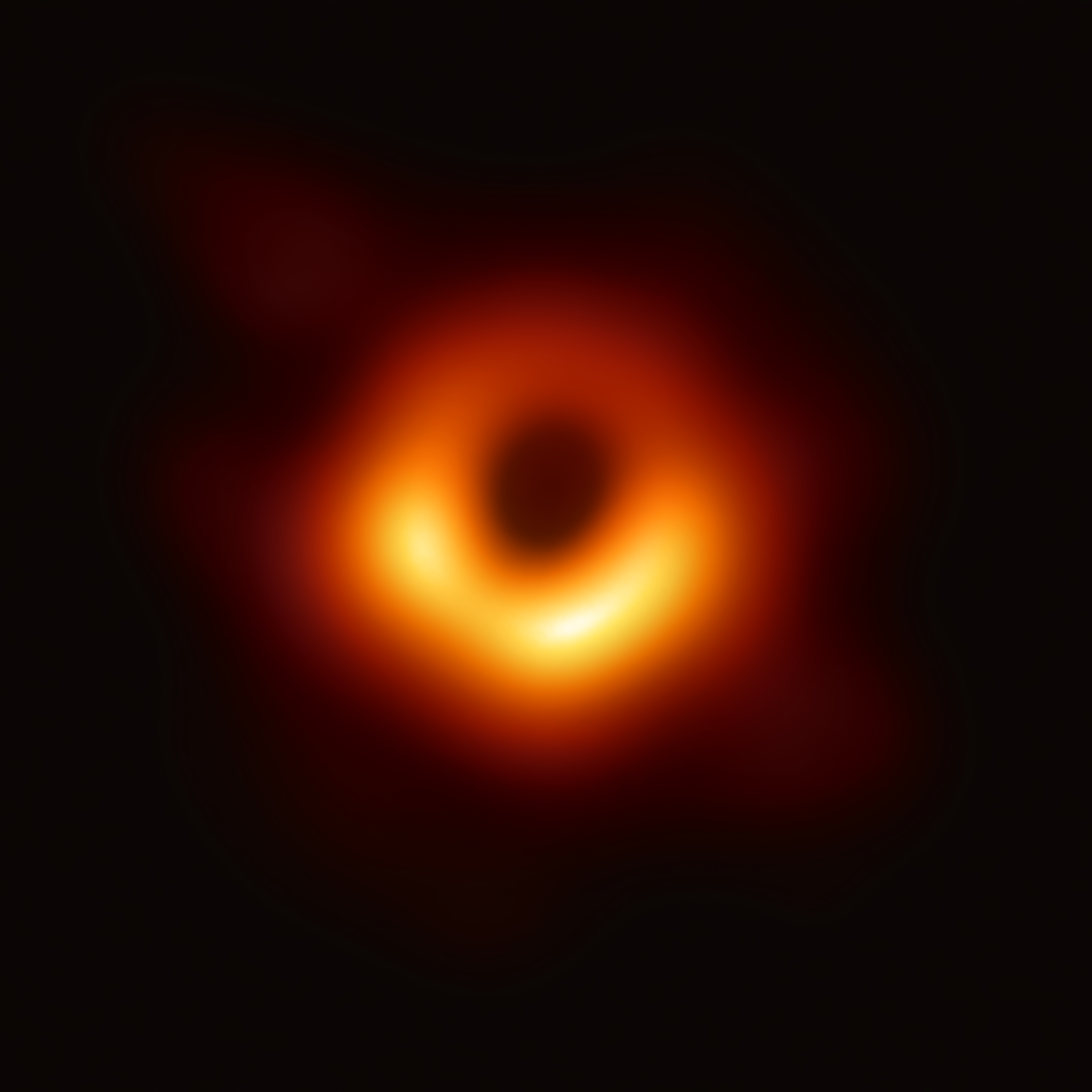
The Event Horizon Telescope image of the core of M87 using 1.3 mm microwaves. The central dark spot is the shadow of M87* and is larger than the black hole's event horizon.

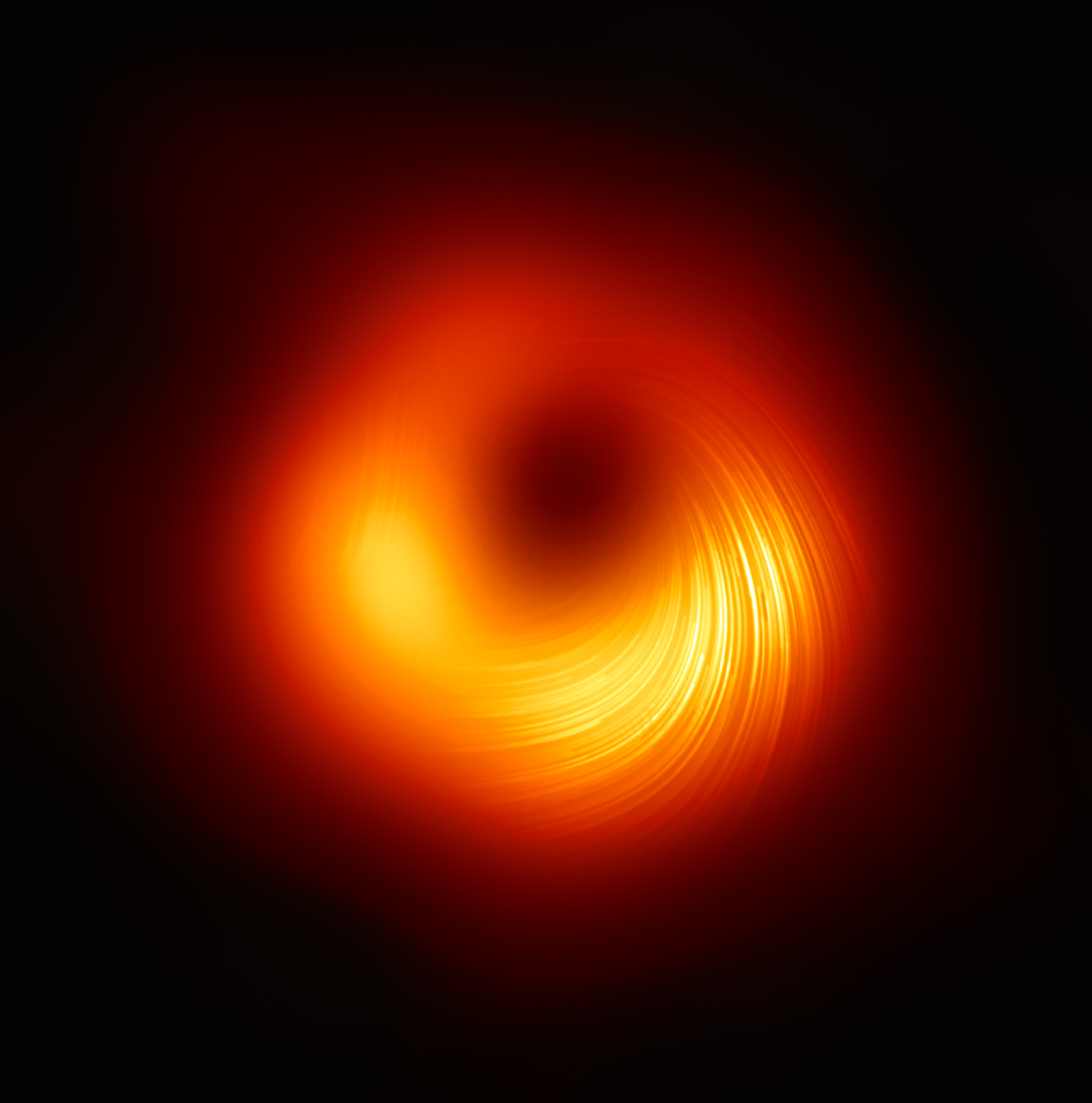
A view of the M87* supermassive black hole released by the Event Horizon Telescope Collaboration with lines overlaid to mark the orientation of polarization of the magnetic field

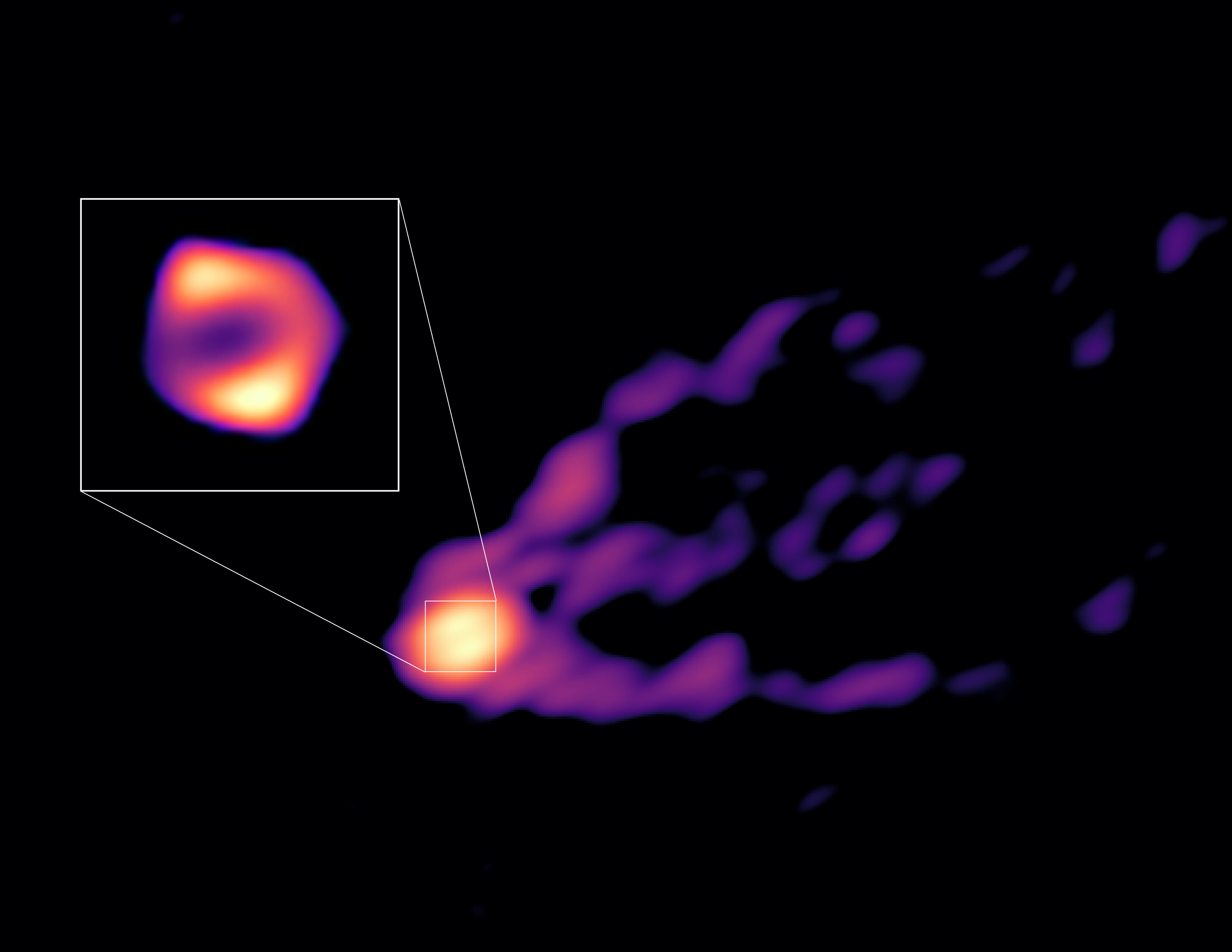
A view of the jet and shadow of M87's black hole (observations from the Global Millimetre VLBI Array (GMVA), the Atacama Large Millimeter/submillimeter Array (ALMA), and the Greenland Telescope)

The core of the galaxy contains a supermassive black hole (SMBH), designated M87*, whose mass is billions of times that of the Earth's Sun; estimates had ranged from (3.5±0.8)×10^{9} M_{☉} to (6.6±0.4)×10^{9} M_{☉}, surpassed by 7.22+0.34
−0.40×10^{9} M_{☉} in 2016. In April 2019, the Event Horizon Telescope collaboration released measurements of the black hole's mass as (6.5 ± 0.2_{stat} ± 0.7_{sys}) × 10^{9} M_{☉}. This is one of the highest-known masses for such an object. A rotating disk of ionized gas surrounds the black hole, and is roughly perpendicular to the relativistic jet. The disk rotates at velocities of up to roughly 1,000 km/s (2.2 million mph) or 1/300 the speed of light, and spans a maximum diameter of 25,000 AU (3.7 trillion km; 2.3 trillion mi). By comparison, Pluto averages 39 AU (5.8 billion km; 3.6 billion mi) from the Sun. Gas accretes onto the black hole at an estimated rate of one solar mass every ten years (about 90 Earth masses per day). The Schwarzschild radius of the black hole is 120 AU (18 billion kilometres; 11 billion miles). The diameter of the ring of emission, as seen from Earth, is 42 μas (microarcsecond). By comparison, the diameter of the core of M87 is 45" (as, arcsecond), and the size of M87 is 7.2' × 6.8' (am, arcminute).

A 2010 paper suggested that the black hole may be displaced from the galactic center by about seven parsecs (23 light-years). This was claimed to be in the opposite direction of the known jet, indicating acceleration of the black hole by it. Another suggestion was that the offset occurred during the merger of two supermassive black holes. However, a 2011 study did not find any statistically significant displacement, and a 2018 study of high-resolution images of M87 concluded that the apparent spatial offset was caused by temporal variations in the jet's brightness rather than a physical displacement of the black hole from the galaxy's center.

==== Imaging ====
This black hole was the first to be imaged. Data to produce the image was taken in April 2017, the image was produced in 2018 and was published on 10 April 2019. The image shows the shadow of the black hole, surrounded by an asymmetric emission ring with a diameter of 690 AU (103 billion km; 64 billion mi). The shadow radius is 2.6 times that of the black hole's Schwarzschild radius. The asymmetry in the brightness of the ring is due to relativistic beaming, whereby material moving towards the observer at relativistic velocities appears brighter. The visible material around the black hole rotates mostly clockwise with respect to the observer, which due to the direction of the axis of rotation causes the bottom part of the emission region to have a component of velocity toward the observer. The rotation parameter was estimated at $a=0.9 \pm 0.1$, corresponding to a rotation speed ≈ 0.4 c. This is consistent with the value of $a=1.00 \pm 0.15$ obtained with the outflow method.

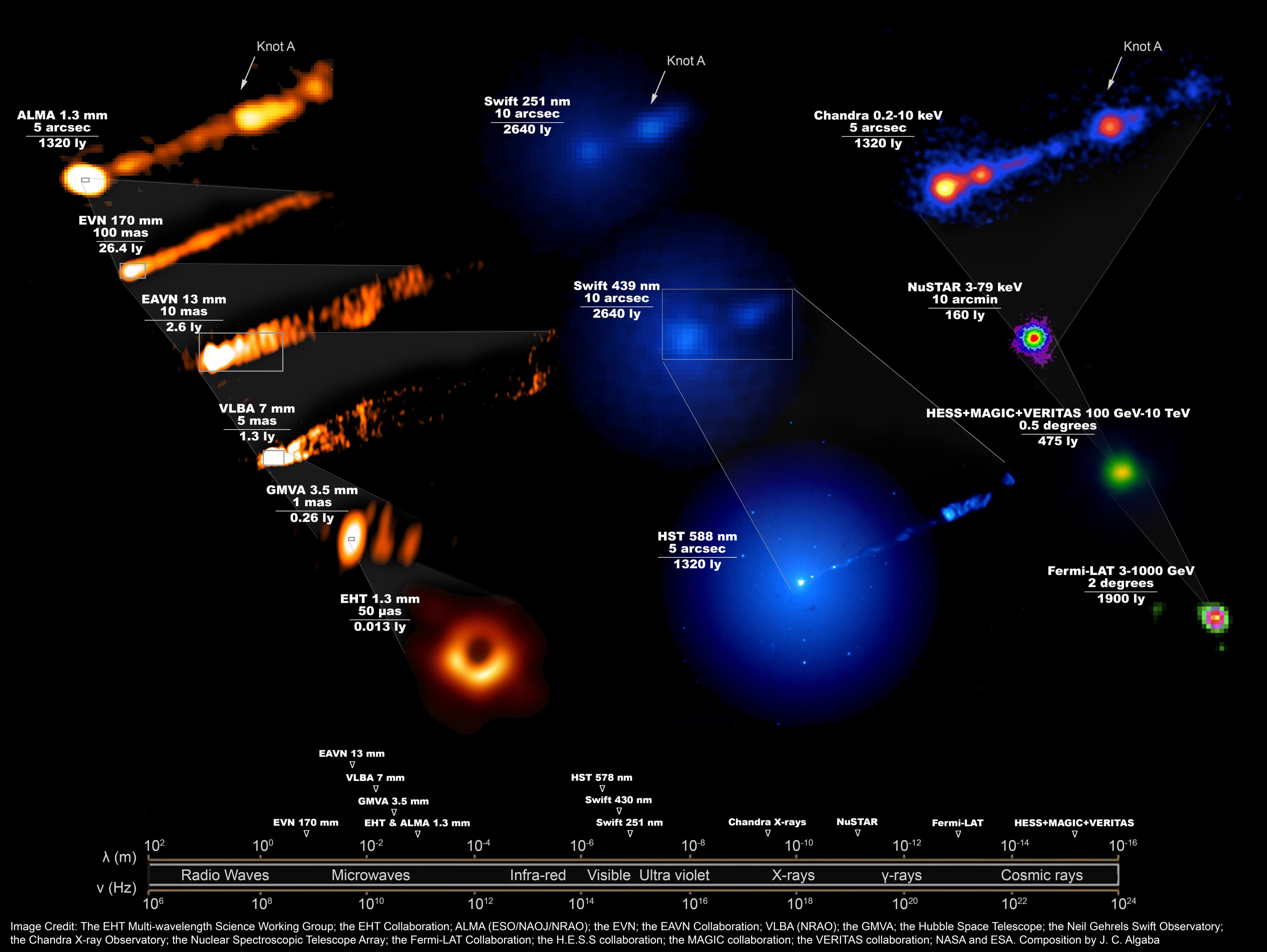
Composite image showing how the M87 system looked, across the entire electromagnetic spectrum, during the Event Horizon Telescope's April 2017 campaign to take the first image of a black hole. Requiring 19 different facilities on the Earth and in space, this image reveals the enormous scales spanned by the black hole and its forward-pointing jet. It shows the image of the larger-scale jet taken by ALMA (upper left), on the same scale as the visible image by the Hubble Space Telescope (center) and the X-ray image by Chandra (upper right).

After the black hole had been imaged, it was named Pōwehi, a Hawaiian word meaning "the adorned fathomless dark creation", taken from the ancient creation chant Kumulipo.

On 24 March 2021, the Event Horizon Telescope collaboration revealed an unprecedented view of the M87 black hole shadow: how it looks in polarized light. Polarization is a tool which allows astronomers to probe physics behind the image in more detail. Light polarization informs us about the strength and orientation of magnetic fields in the ring of light around the black hole shadow. Knowing those is essential to understand how M87's supermassive black hole is launching jets of magnetized plasma, which expand at relativistic speeds beyond the M87 galaxy.

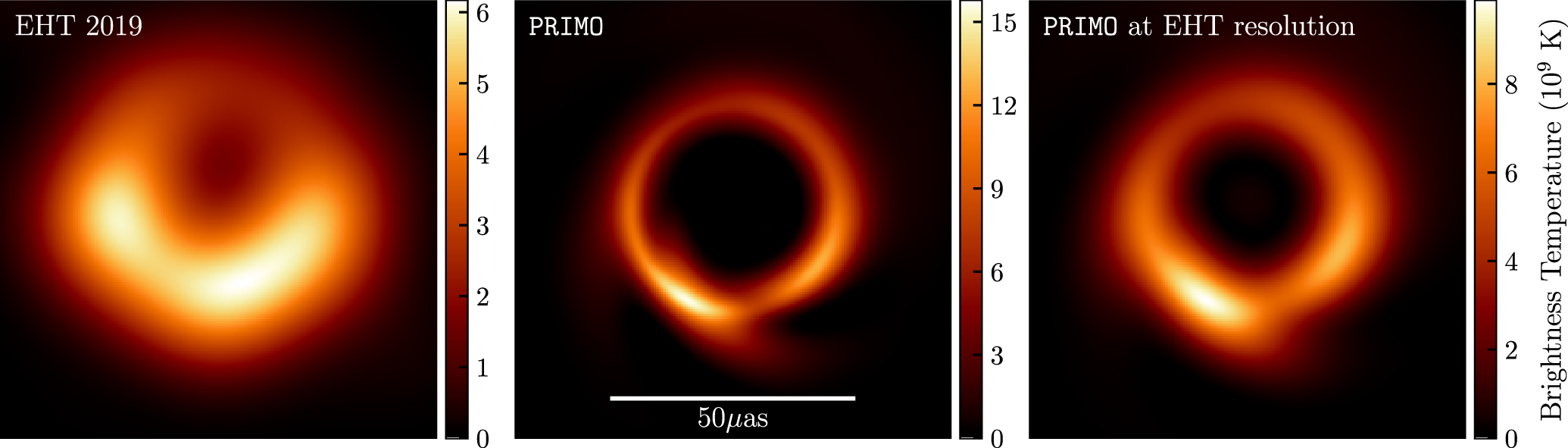
Sharpening of the original EHT imaging of the M87 black hole, using the PRIMO technique for interferometric modeling. The rightmost image adds back in some fuzzing to account for the limited resolving power of the underlying observations.

On 14 April 2021, astronomers further reported that the M87 black hole and its surroundings were studied during Event Horizon Telescope 2017 observing run also by many multi-wavelength observatories from around the world.

In April 2023, a team developed a new principal-component interferometric modeling (PRIMO) technique to produce sharper image reconstructions from EHT data. They applied this to the original EHT observations of the M87 black hole, yielding a crisper final image and allowing closer testing of the alignment of observations to theory.

=== Jet ===
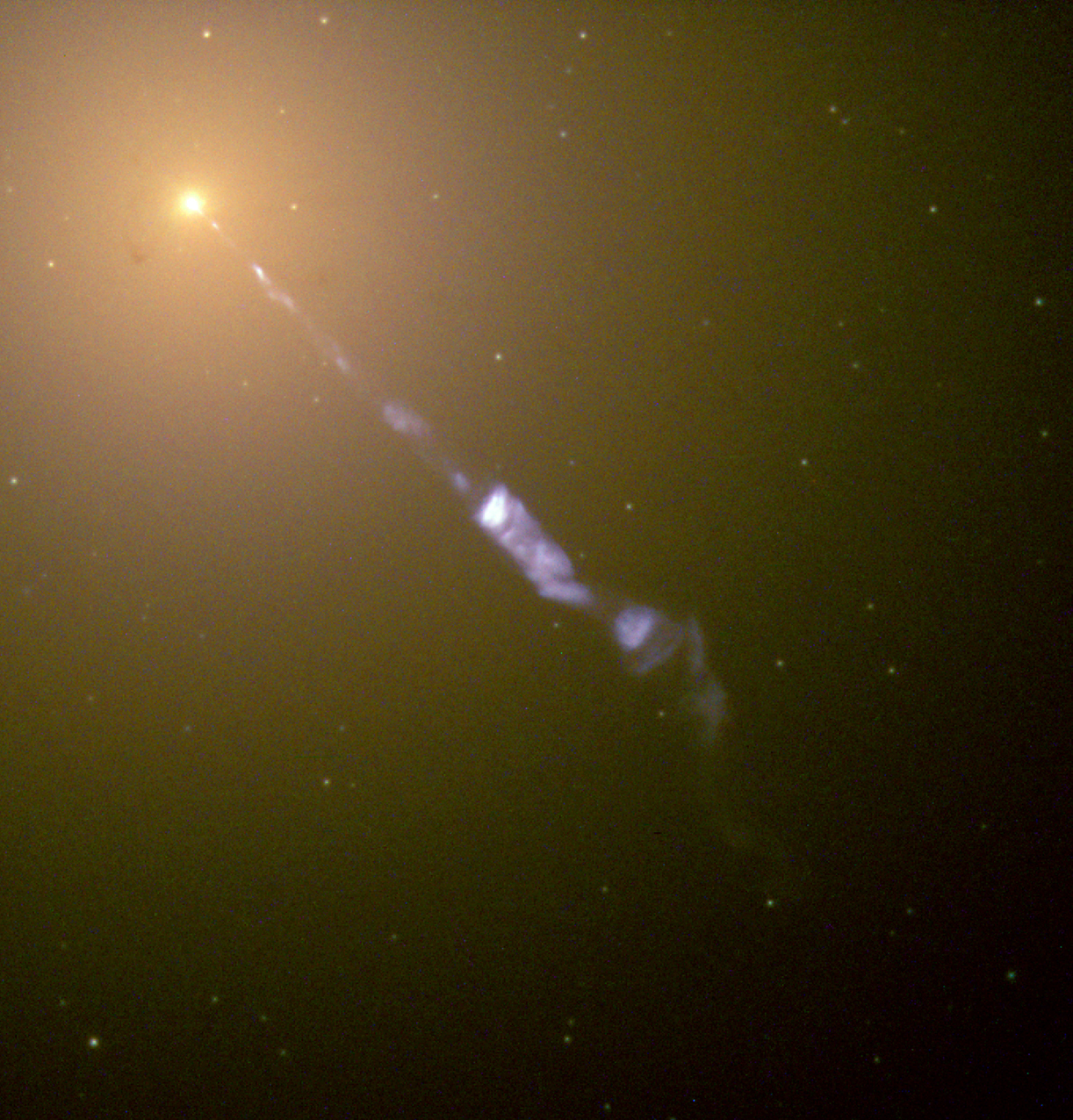
The jet of matter is ejected from M87 at nearly the speed of light, and stretches 1.5 kpc (5 kly) from the galactic core.

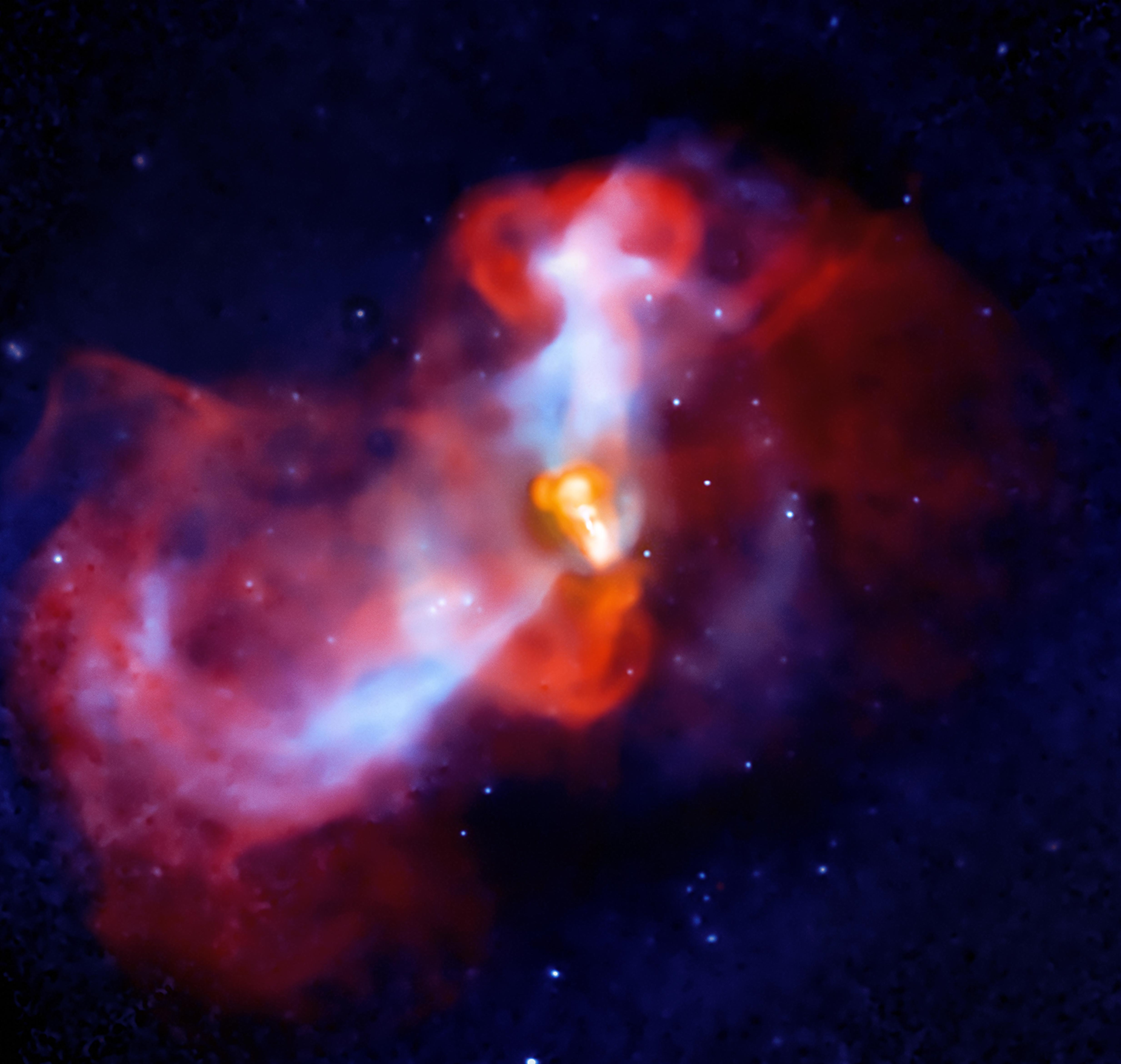
In this X-ray (Chandra) and radio (VLA) composite image, hot matter (blue in X-ray) from the Virgo cluster falls toward the core of M87 and cools, where it is met by the relativistic jet (orange in radio), producing shock waves in the galaxy's interstellar medium.

The relativistic jet of matter emerging from the core extends at least 1.5 kiloparsecs (5,000 light-years) from the nucleus and consists of matter ejected from a supermassive black hole. The jet is highly collimated, appearing constrained to an angle of 60° within 0.8 pc (2.6 light-years) of the core, to about 16° at two parsecs (6.5 light-years), and to 6–7° at twelve parsecs (39 light-years). Its base has the diameter of 5.5 ± 0.4 Schwarzschild radii, and is probably powered by a prograde accretion disk around the spinning supermassive black hole. The German-American astronomer Walter Baade found that light from the jet was plane polarized, which suggests that the energy is generated by the acceleration of electrons moving at relativistic velocities in a magnetic field. The total energy of these electrons is estimated at 5.1 × 10^{56} ergs (5.1 × 10^{49} joules or 3.2 × 10^{68} eV). This is roughly 10^{13} times the energy produced in the entire Milky Way in one second, which is estimated at 5 × 10^{36} joules. The jet is surrounded by a lower-velocity non-relativistic component. There is evidence of a counter jet, but it remains unseen from the Earth due to relativistic beaming. The jet is precessing, causing the outflow to form a helical pattern out to 1.6 parsecs (5.2 light-years). Lobes of expelled matter extend out to 80 kiloparsecs (260,000 light-years).

In pictures taken by the Hubble Space Telescope in 1999, the motion of M87's jet was measured at four to six times the speed of light. This phenomenon, called superluminal motion, is an illusion caused by the relativistic velocity of the jet. The time interval between any two light pulses emitted by the jet is, as registered by the observer, less than the actual interval due to the relativistic speed of the jet moving in the direction of the observer. This results in perceived faster-than-light speeds, though the jet itself has a velocity of only 80–85% the speed of light. Detection of such motion is used to support the theory that quasars, BL Lacertae objects and radio galaxies may all be the same phenomenon, known as active galaxies, viewed from different perspectives. It is proposed that the nucleus of M87 is a BL Lacertae object (of lower luminosity than its surrounds) seen from a relatively large angle. Flux variations, characteristic of the BL Lacertae objects, have been observed in M87.

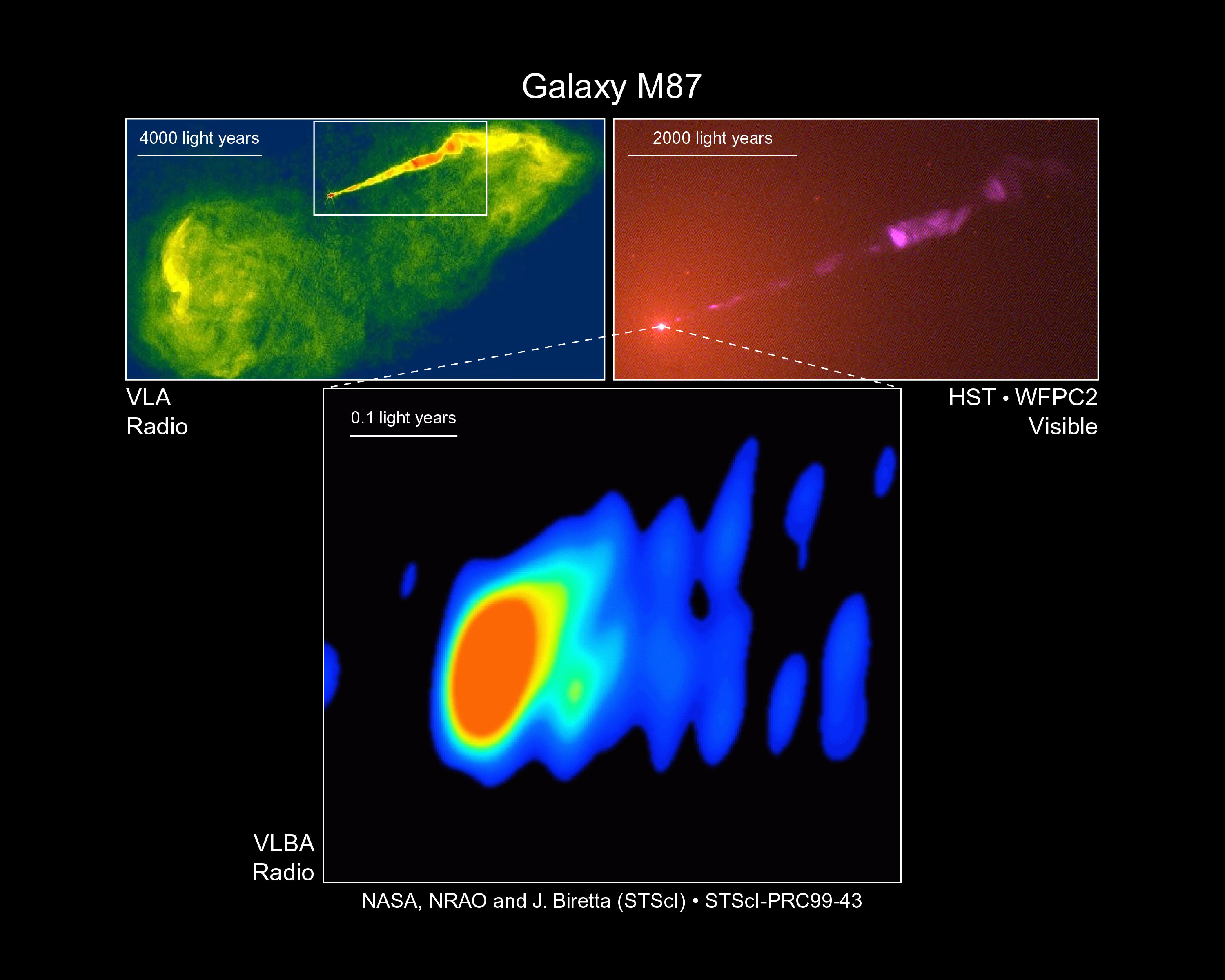
Radio wavelength image of M87 showing strong radio emission from the core

Observations indicate that the rate at which material is ejected from the supermassive black hole is variable. These variations produce pressure waves in the hot gas surrounding M87. The Chandra X-ray Observatory has detected loops and rings in the gas. Their distribution suggests that minor eruptions occur every few million years. One of the rings, caused by a major eruption, is a shock wave 26 kiloparsecs (85,000 light-years) in diameter around the black hole. Other features observed include narrow X-ray-emitting filaments up to 31 kiloparsecs (100,000 light-years) long, and a large cavity in the hot gas caused by a major eruption 70 million years ago. The regular eruptions prevent a huge reservoir of gas from cooling and forming stars, implying that M87's evolution may have been seriously affected, preventing it from becoming a large spiral galaxy.

M87 is a very strong source of gamma rays, the most energetic rays of the electromagnetic spectrum. Gamma rays emitted by M87 have been observed since the late 1990s. In 2006, using the High Energy Stereoscopic System Cherenkov telescopes, scientists measured the variations of the gamma ray flux coming from M87, and found that the flux changes over a matter of days. This short period indicates that the most likely source of the gamma rays is a supermassive black hole. In general, the smaller the diameter of the emission source, the faster the variation in flux.

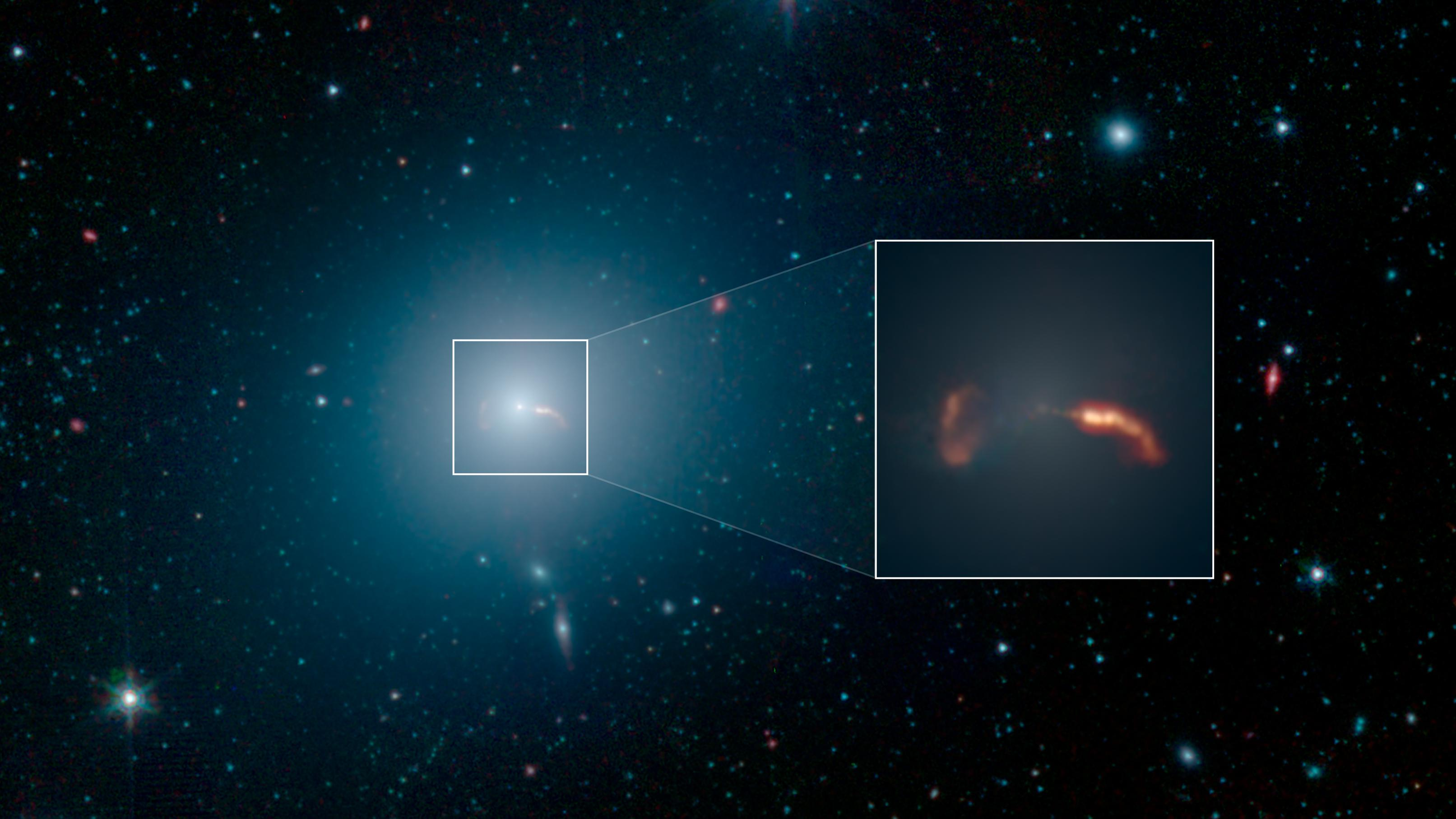
M87 in infrared showing shocks produced by the jets

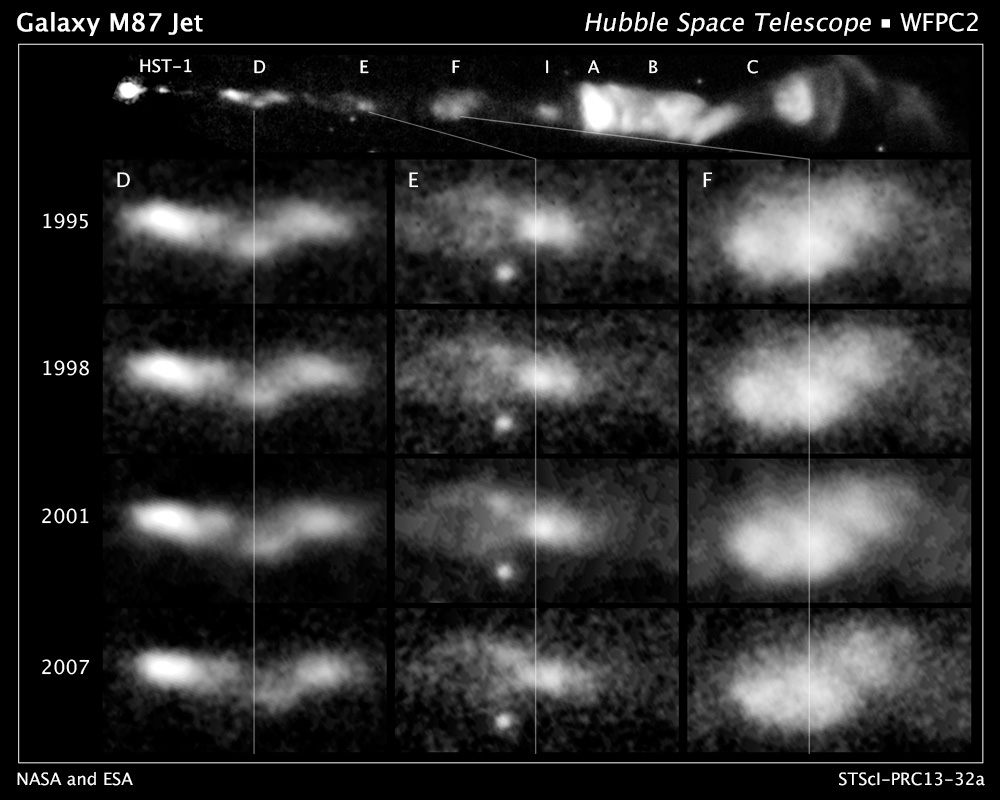
Spiral flow of the black hole-powered jet

A knot of matter in the jet (designated HST-1), about 65 parsecs (210 light-years) from the core, has been tracked by the Hubble Space Telescope and the Chandra X-ray Observatory. By 2006, the X-ray intensity of this knot had increased by a factor of 50 over a four-year period, while the X-ray emission has since been decaying in a variable manner.

The interaction of relativistic jets of plasma emanating from the core with the surrounding medium gives rise to radio lobes in active galaxies. The lobes occur in pairs and are often symmetrical. The two radio lobes of M87 together span about 80 kiloparsecs; the inner parts, extending up to 2 kiloparsecs, emit strongly at radio wavelengths. Two flows of material emerge from this region, one aligned with the jet itself and the other in the opposite direction. The flows are asymmetrical and deformed, implying that they encounter a dense intra-cluster medium. At greater distances, both flows diffuse into two lobes. The lobes are surrounded by a fainter halo of radio-emitting gas.

=== Interstellar medium ===
The space between the stars in M87 is filled with a diffuse interstellar medium of gas that has been chemically enriched by the elements ejected from stars as they passed beyond their main sequence lifetime. Carbon and nitrogen are continuously supplied by stars of intermediate mass as they pass through the asymptotic giant branch. The heavier elements from oxygen to iron are produced largely by supernova explosions within the galaxy. Of the heavy elements, about 60% were produced by core-collapse supernovae, while the remainder came from Type Ia supernovae.

The distribution of oxygen is roughly uniform throughout, at about half of the solar value (i.e., oxygen abundance in the Sun), while iron distribution peaks near the center where it approaches the solar iron value. Since oxygen is produced mainly by core-collapse supernovae, which occur during the early stages of galaxies, and mostly in outer star-forming regions, the distribution of these elements suggests an early enrichment of the interstellar medium from core-collapse supernovae and a continuous contribution from Type Ia supernovae throughout the history of M87. The contribution of elements from these sources was much lower than in the Milky Way.

Selected elemental abundances in the M87 core
Element	Abundance (solar values)
C	0.63 ± 0.16
N	1.64 ± 0.24
O	0.58 ± 0.03
Ne	1.41 ± 0.12
Mg	0.67 ± 0.05
Fe	0.95 ± 0.03

Examination of M87 at far infrared wavelengths shows an excess emission at wavelengths longer than 25 μm. Normally, this may be an indication of thermal emission by warm dust. In the case of M87, the emission can be fully explained by synchrotron radiation from the jet; within the galaxy, silicate grains are expected to survive for no more than 46 million years because of the X-ray emission from the core. This dust may be destroyed by the hostile environment or expelled from the galaxy. The combined mass of dust in M87 is no more than 70,000 times the mass of the Sun. By comparison, the Milky Way's dust equals about a hundred million (10^{8}) solar masses.

Although M87 is an elliptical galaxy and therefore lacks the dust lanes of a spiral galaxy, optical filaments have been observed in it, which arise from gas falling towards the core. Emission probably comes from shock-induced excitation as the falling gas streams encounter X-rays from the core region. These filaments have an estimated mass of about 10,000 M_{☉}. Surrounding the galaxy is an extended corona with hot, low-density gas.

=== Globular clusters ===
M87 has an abnormally large population of globular clusters. A 2006 survey out to an angular distance of 25′ from the core estimates that there are 12,000 ± 800 globular clusters in orbit around M87, compared with 150–200 in and around the Milky Way. The clusters are similar in size distribution to those of the Milky Way, most having an effective radius of 1 to 6 parsecs. The size of the M87 clusters gradually increases with distance from the galactic center. Within a four-kiloparsec (13,000-light-year) radius of the core, the cluster metallicity—the abundance of elements other than hydrogen and helium—is about half the abundance in the Sun. Outside this radius, metallicity steadily declines as the cluster distance from the core increases. Clusters with low metallicity are somewhat larger than metal-rich clusters. In 2014, HVGC-1, the first hypervelocity globular cluster, was discovered escaping from M87 at 2,300 km/s. The escape of the cluster with such a high velocity was speculated to have been the result of a close encounter with, and subsequent gravitational kick from, a supermassive black hole binary.

Almost a hundred ultra-compact dwarfs have been identified in M87. They resemble globular clusters but have a diameter of ten parsecs (33 light-years) or more, much larger than the three-parsec (9.8-light-year) maximum of globular clusters. It is unclear whether they are dwarf galaxies captured by M87 or a new class of massive globular cluster.

== Environment ==
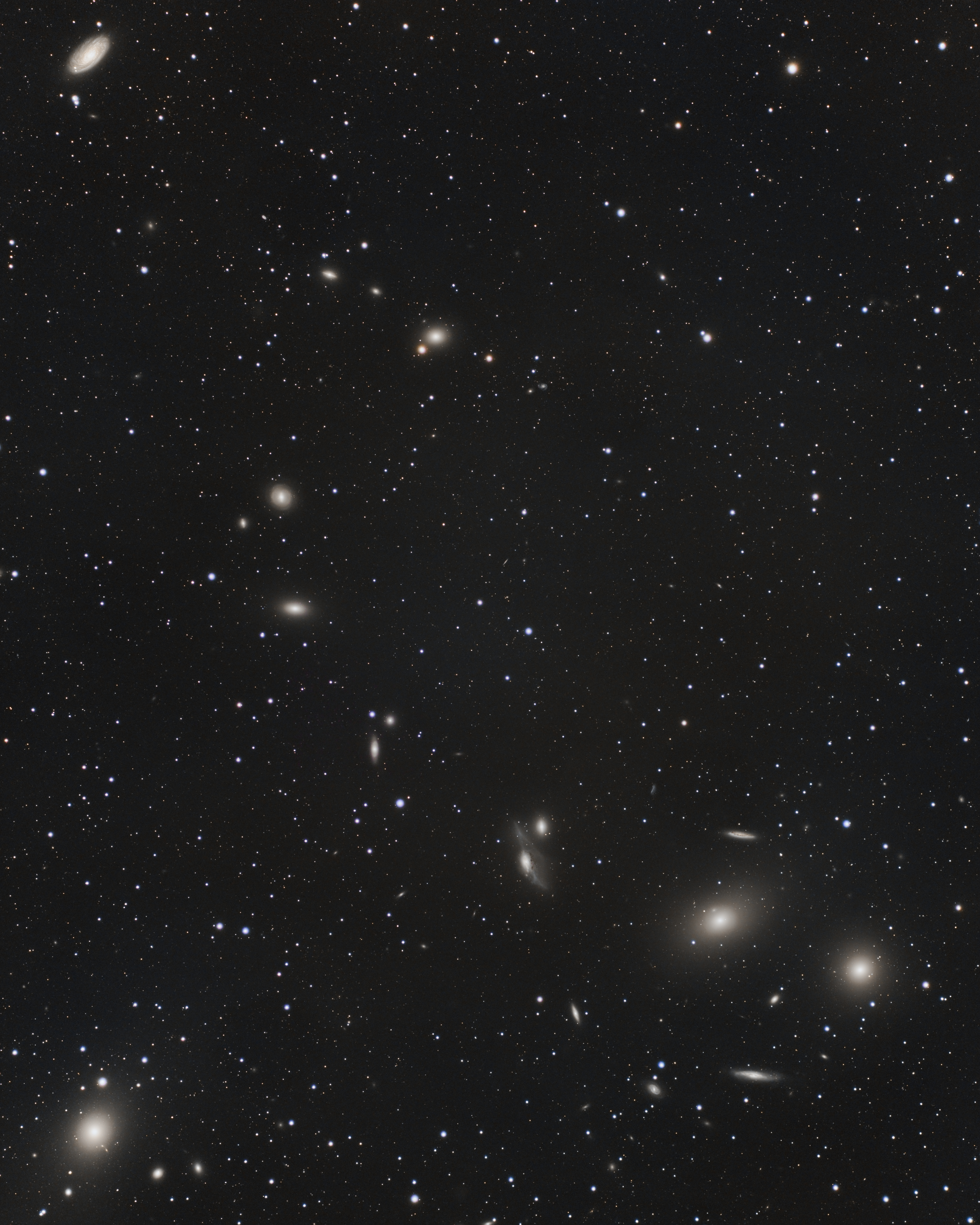
Photograph of Markarian's Chain of Galaxies, taken through a widefield telescope. M87 is visible in the bottom left corner.

M87 is near (or at) the center of the Virgo Cluster, a closely compacted structure of about 2,000 galaxies. This forms the core of the larger Virgo Supercluster, of which the Local Group (including the Milky Way) is an outlying member. It is organized into at least three distinct subsystems associated with the three large galaxies—M87, M49 and M86—with the core subgroup including M87 (Virgo A) and M49 (Virgo B). There is a preponderance of elliptical and S0 galaxies around M87. A chain of elliptical galaxies roughly aligns with the jet. In terms of mass, M87 is likely to be the largest, and coupled with centrality appears to be moving very little relative to the cluster as a whole. It is defined in one study as the cluster center. The cluster has a sparse gaseous medium that emits X-rays, lower in temperature toward the middle. The combined mass of the cluster is estimated to be 0.15 to 1.5 × 10^{15} M_{☉}.

Measurements of the motion of those intracluster starburst ("planetary") nebulae between M87 and M86 suggest that the two galaxies are moving toward each other and that this may be their first encounter. M87 may have interacted with M84, as evidenced by the truncation of M87's outer halo by tidal interactions. The truncated halo may also have been caused by contraction due to an unseen mass falling into M87 from the rest of the cluster, which may be the hypothesized dark matter. A third possibility is that the halo's formation was truncated by early feedback from the active galactic nucleus.

== See also ==
- Messier object
- Sagittarius A*
