= NGC 7087 =

Galaxy in the constellation of Grus

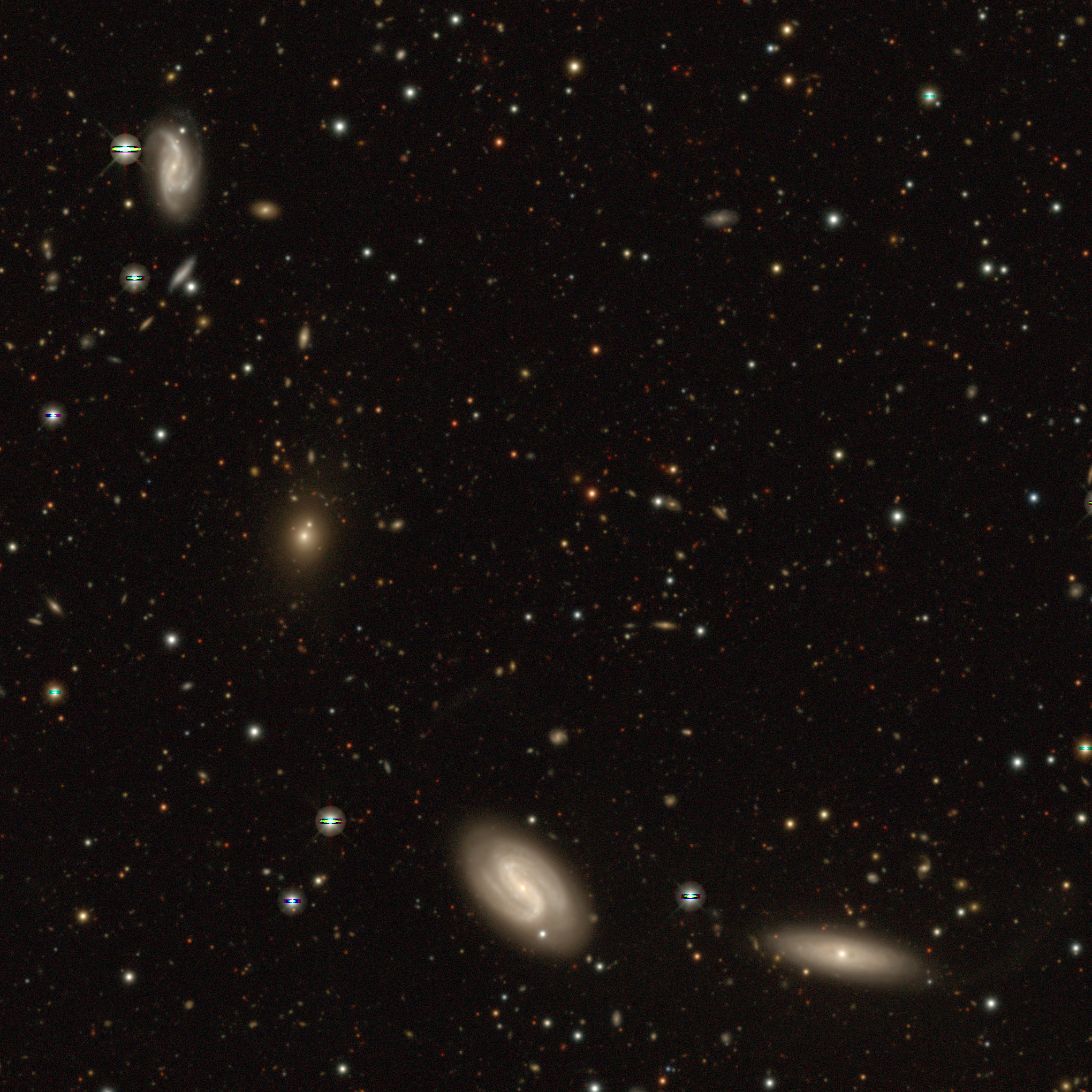
- The galaxy NGC 7087 (middle bottom) and other galaxies

Observation data (J2000 epoch)
- Constellation: Grus
- Right ascension: 21^{h} 34^{m} 33.5^{s}
- Declination: −40° 49′ 07″
- Redshift: 0.016968
- Heliocentric radial velocity: 5,087 km/s
- Distance: 216.6 Mly
- Apparent magnitude (V): 13.72

Characteristics
- Type: SB(s)ab
- Apparent size (V): 1.1' x 0.6'

Other designations
- ESO 343-8, AM 2131-410, IRAS 21314-4102, MCG -7-44-25, PGC 66988

NGC 7087 is a barred spiral galaxy located about 215 million light-years away in the constellation of Grus. NGC 7087 was discovered by astronomer John Herschel on September 4, 1834.

NGC 7087 is a member of a group of galaxies known as the NGC 7087 group.

== See also ==
- NGC 1300
