= KCC =

KCC may refer to:

== Education ==
- Kankakee Community College, a college in Kankakee, Illinois
- Kansas Christian College (Overland Park), a college in Overland Park, Kansas
- Kapiʻolani Community College, a college in Honolulu, Hawaii
- Kellogg Community College, a college in Battle Creek, Michigan
- Kensington and Chelsea College, a College in West London, United Kingdom
- Kentucky Christian College, the former name of Kentucky Christian University
- Kiangsu-Chekiang College
  - Kiangsu-Chekiang College (Kwai Chung), a secondary school in Kwai Chung, Hong Kong
  - Kiangsu-Chekiang College (Shatin), a secondary school in Shatin, Hong Kong
  - Kiangsu-Chekiang College, International Section, a secondary school in Braemar Hill, North Point, Hong Kong
- Kingsborough Community College, a college in Brooklyn, New York
- King Charles Club, a dining society at the University of Oxford
- Kingsthorpe Community College, now known simply as Kingsthorpe College
- Kirtland Community College, a public college in Roscommon in Northern Michigan
- Klamath Community College, in Klamath Falls, Oregon

== Organizations ==
- KCC Corporation, a Korean chemical manufacturer
- Kampala City Council, the local government authority in Kampala, Uganda
- Katoomba Christian Convention, an interdenominational ministry providing Bible preaching
- Kent County Council, England
- Kerala Council of Churches, an ecumenical organization in India
- Khulna City Corporation, a city corporation in Bangladesh
- King County Council, the government of King County in the state of Washington, United States of America
- Korea Communications Commission, a South Korean central government organization
- Korfbal Combinatie Capelle, a korfball and boules club from Capelle aan den IJssel, Netherlands
- Kowloon Central Cluster, hospital cluster under the Hospital Authority in Hong Kong

== Places ==
- KCC Mall, a shopping mall in the Philippines
- Kandy City Centre, a commercial and a shopping complex in Kandy, Sri Lanka
- Kigali Convention Centre, a convention centre in Kigali

== Science and technology ==
- Chloride potassium symporter
- Korea Computer Center, the leading North Korean government computer research center

== Sports ==
- Kampala City Council FC, a Ugandan football (soccer) club
- Kansas City Chiefs, a National Football League team based in Missouri
- Kansas City Current, a National Women's Soccer League team based in Missouri
- Kowloon Cricket Club, a cricket club and social club in Kowloon, Hong Kong

== People ==
- Kyra Cooney-Cross, an Australian professional soccer player

== Other uses ==
- Kirby: Canvas Curse, a Nintendo DS video game
