= Markarian's Chain =

Stretch of galaxies that is a part of the Virgo Cluster

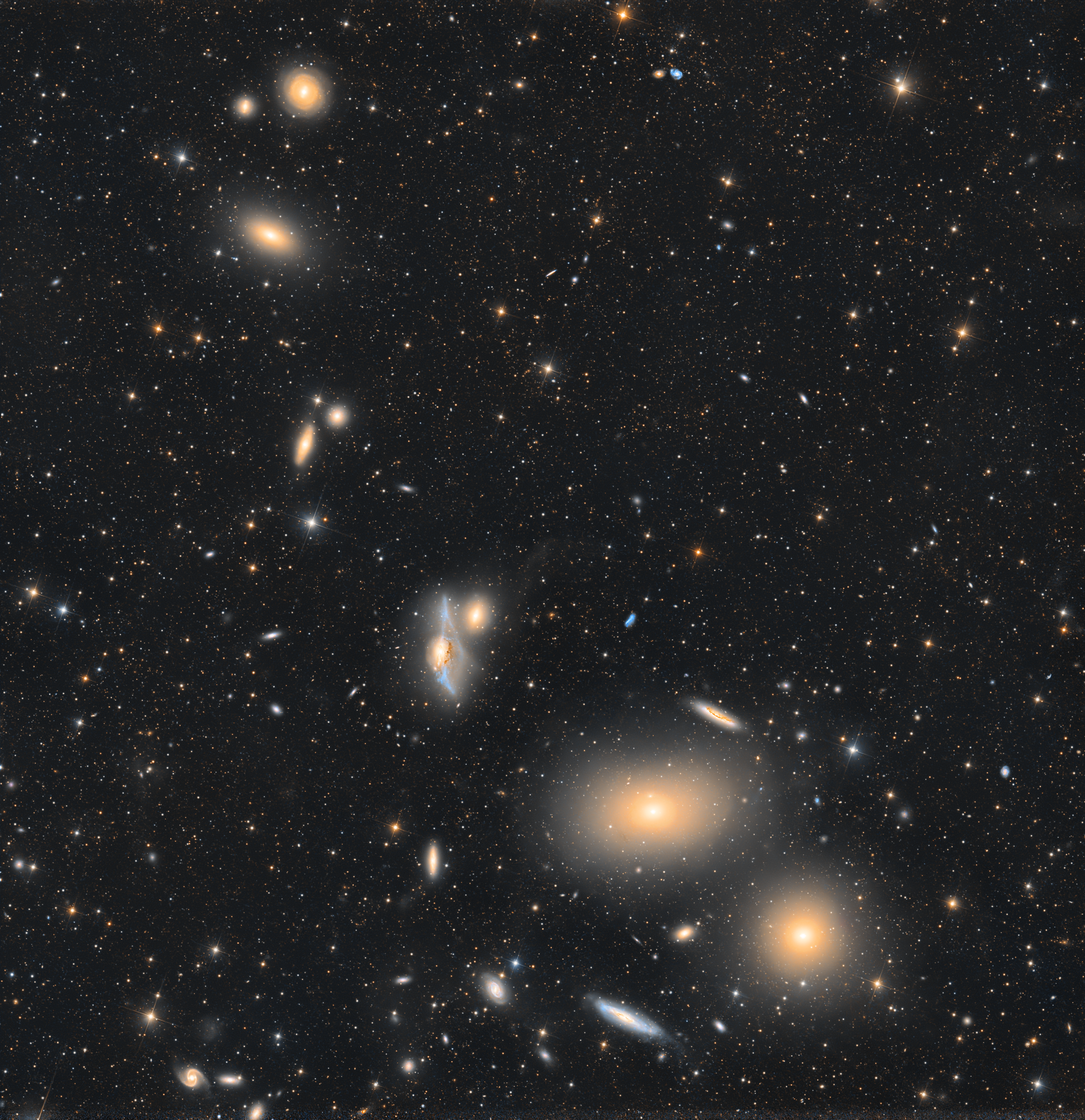
- Markarian's Chain in an amateur telescope

Observation data (Epoch J2000)
- Constellation: Virgo
- Right ascension: 12^{h} 27^{m}
- Declination: +13° 10′

Markarian's Chain is a stretch of galaxies that forms part of the Virgo Cluster. When viewed from Earth, the galaxies lie along a smoothly curved line. Charles Messier first discovered two of the galaxies, M84 and M86, in 1781. The other galaxies seen in the chain were discovered by William Herschel and are now known primarily by their catalog numbers in John Louis Emil Dreyer's New General Catalogue, published in 1888. It was ultimately named after the Armenian astrophysicist, Benjamin Markarian, who discovered their common motion in the early 1960s. Member galaxies include M84 (NGC 4374), M86 (NGC 4406), NGC 4477, NGC 4473, NGC 4461, NGC 4458, NGC 4438 and NGC 4435. It is located at RA 12^{h} 27^{m} and Dec +13° 10′.

The bright members of the chain are visible through small telescopes. Larger telescopes can be used to view the fainter galaxies. Near the center there appear the pair of interacting galaxies NGC 4438 and NGC 4435, about 50 million light-years away, known to some as Markarian's Eyes.

At least seven galaxies in the chain appear to move coherently, although others appear to be superposed by chance. Six of the points on the chain can be marked by galaxies. The other two points are pairs of galaxies.

== Notable Objects ==
Galaxy Name	Designation	Galaxy Type	Characteristics	Distance (Mly)	Notable Features
M84	NGC 4374	E1	Elliptical galaxy	60	Contains a supermassive black hole
M86	NGC 4406	S0/E3	Barred Lenticular galaxy	52	High-speed motion relative to the Virgo Cluster
Eyes Galaxies, Arp 120	NGC 4438	SA0/Sb	Distorted spiral galaxy	52	Interacting with NGC 4435, tidal disruptions
Eyes Galaxies, Arp 120	NGC 4435	S0	Barred Lenticular galaxy	52	Companion to NGC 4438, tidal interactions
NGC 4461	NGC 4461 [NGC 4443]	SB0	Lenticular galaxy	50	
NGC 4473	NGC 4473	E5	Elliptical galaxy	50	Fast rotation
NGC 4477	NGC 4477	SB0	Barred lenticular galaxy	50	Features a bar structure
NGC 4458	NGC 4458	E0	Elliptical galaxy	53	Smaller elliptical

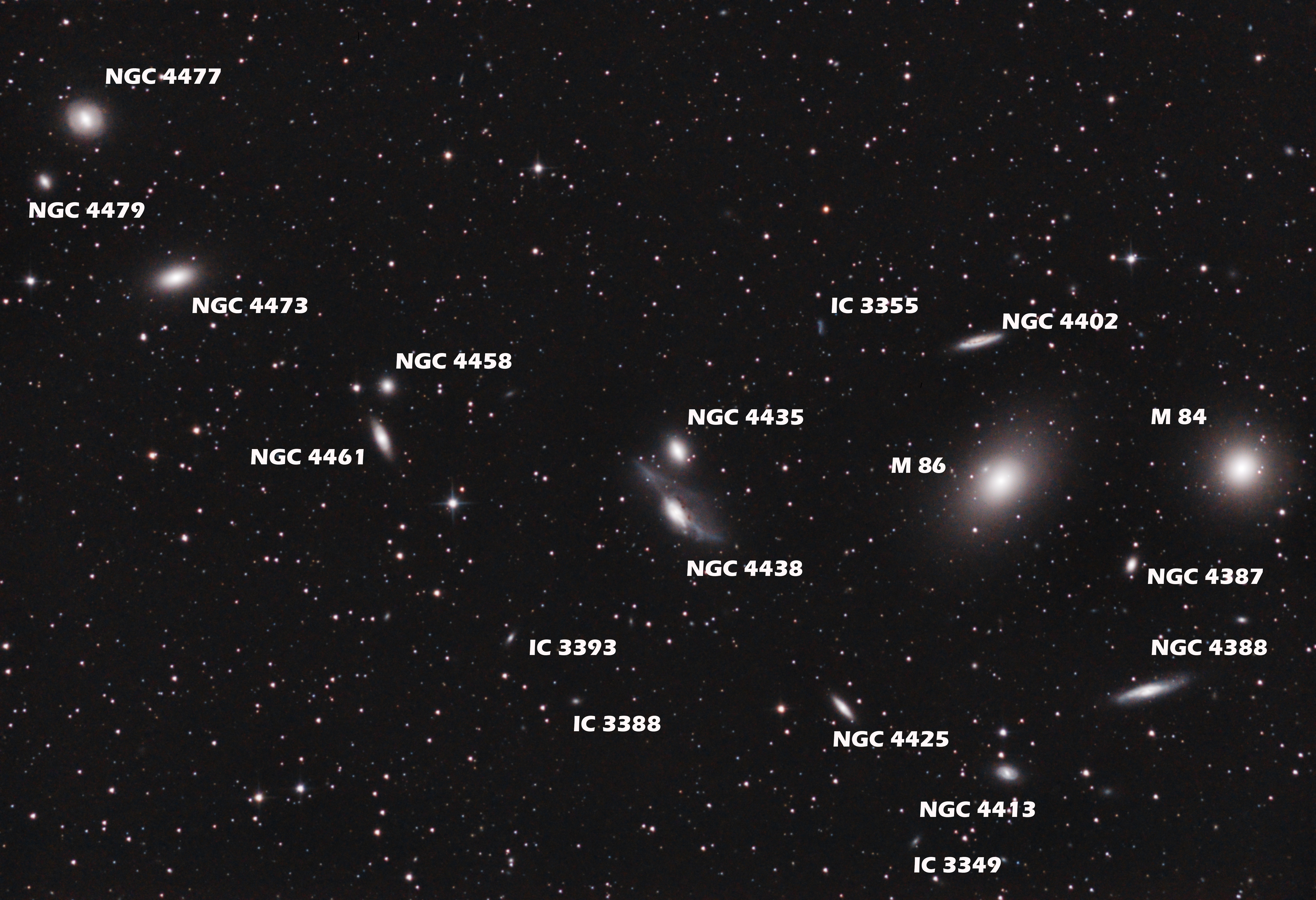
Markarian's Chain with objects labeled

== See also ==
- Burbidge's Chain
