= NGC 4489 =

Galaxy in the constellation Coma Berenices

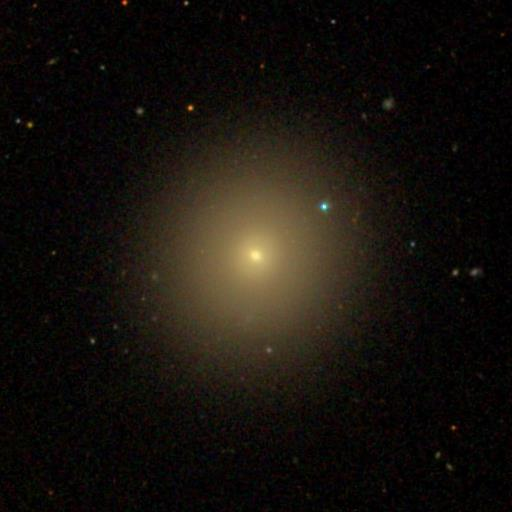
- The elliptical galaxy NGC 4489.

Observation data (J2000 epoch)
- Constellation: Coma Berenices
- Right ascension: 12^{h} 30^{m} 52.2^{s}
- Declination: 16° 45′ 32″
- Redshift: 0.003206/961 km/s
- Distance: 57 Mly
- Group or cluster: Virgo Cluster
- Apparent magnitude (V): 12.84

Characteristics
- Type: E
- Size: ~26,000 ly
- Apparent size (V): 1.7 x 1.5

Other designations
- CGCG 99-73, MCG 3-32-54, PGC 41365, UGC 7655, VCC 1321

NGC 4489 is a dwarf elliptical galaxy located about 60 million light-years away in the constellation of Coma Berenices. It was discovered by astronomer William Herschel on March 21, 1784. NGC 4489 is a member of the Virgo Cluster.

== See also ==
- List of NGC objects (4001–5000)
- Messier 32
- NGC 4458
- NGC 4406
