= NGC 247 =

Galaxy in the constellation Cetus

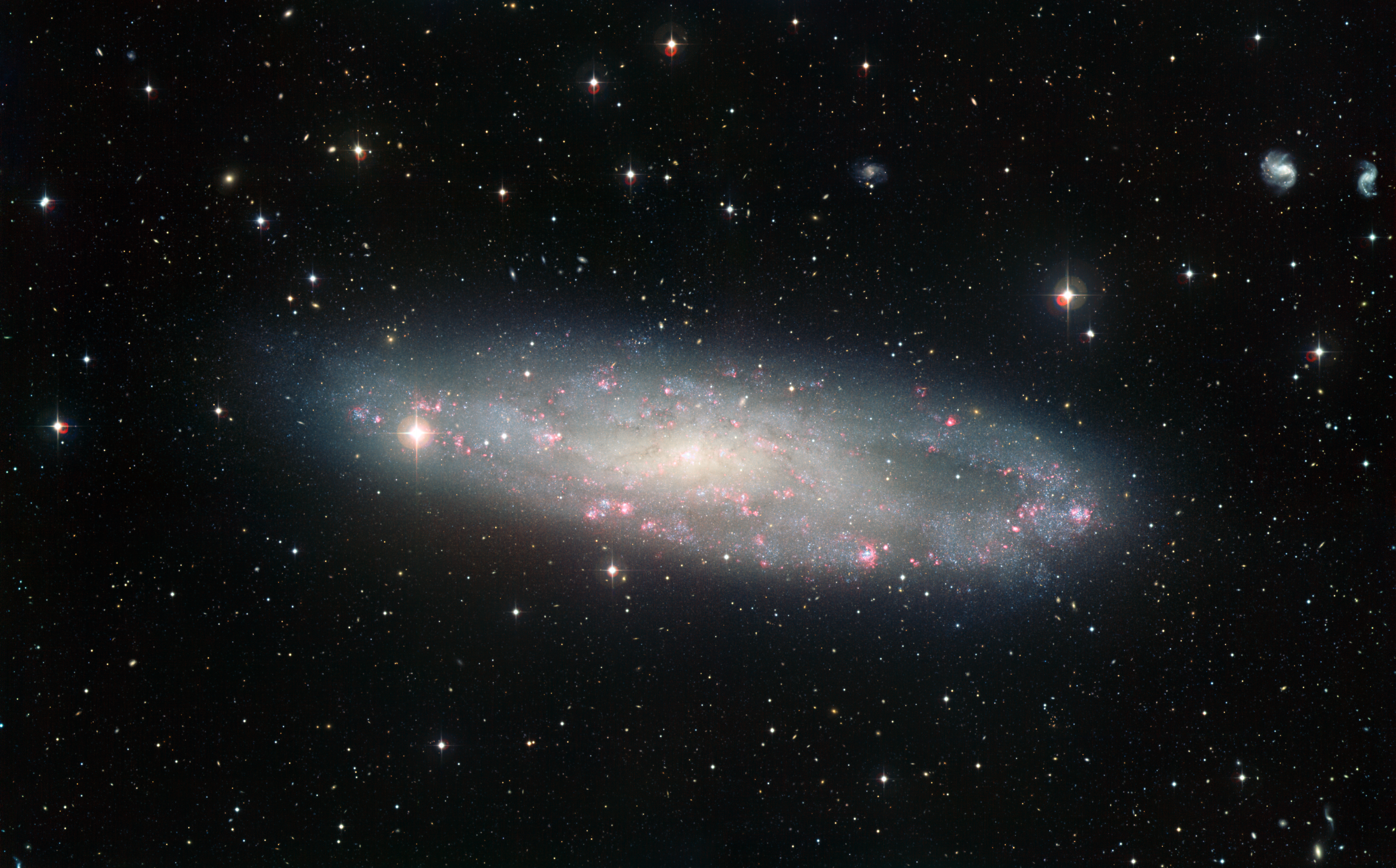
- NGC 247 imaged by the Wide Field Imager (WFI) at ESO's La Silla Observatory in Chile

Observation data (J2000 epoch)
- Constellation: Cetus
- Right ascension: 00^{h} 47^{m} 08.2851^{s}
- Declination: −20° 45′ 37.645″
- Distance: 11.02 ± 0.20 Mly (3.38 ± 0.06 Mpc)
- Apparent magnitude (V): 9.86

Characteristics
- Type: SAB(s)d
- Size: ~93,000 ly (28.52 kpc) (estimated)
- Apparent size (V): 21.4′ × 6.9′

Other designations
- HIPASS J0047-20, LEDA 2758, ESO-LV 540-0220, IRAS F00446-2101, 2MASX J00470855-2045374, ESO 540-22, IRAS 00446-2101, MCG-04-03-005, GLXY G113.8-83.5+144, KUG 0044-210, UGCA 11, PGC 2758, Caldwell 62

NGC 247 (also known as Caldwell 62 and commonly known as the Claw Galaxy) is an intermediate spiral galaxy in the constellation Cetus. Its distance has been computed to be 11.02 ± 0.20 Mly (3.38 ± 0.06 Mpc) by using near-infrared photometry of Cepheid variables. The galaxy had previously been estimated to be about 12.2 Mly distant. It was discovered by German-British astronomer William Herschel on 20 October 1784.

NGC 247 is a member of the Sculptor Group, and is about 93,000 light years in diameter. NGC 247 has an unusually large void on one side of its spiral disk. This void contains some older, redder stars but no younger, bluer stars.

== Nearby galaxies and galaxy group information ==
NGC 247 is one of several galaxies that is gravitationally bound to the Sculptor Galaxy (NGC 253). These galaxies form a small core in the center of the Sculptor Group, which is one of the nearest groups of galaxies to the Milky Way. Most other galaxies associated with the Sculptor Group are only weakly gravitationally bound to this core.

== Burbidge's Chain ==
In 1963, Geoffrey Burbidge and Margaret Burbidge identified a group of five background galaxies located northeast of NGC 247. This grouping came to be known as Burbidge's Chain, and in 1977 it was listed in the VV catalog as VV 518. Individually, the 5 galaxies are also identified as NGC 247A, NGC 247B, NGC 247C, NGC 247D, and ESO 540-025.

== Image Gallery ==
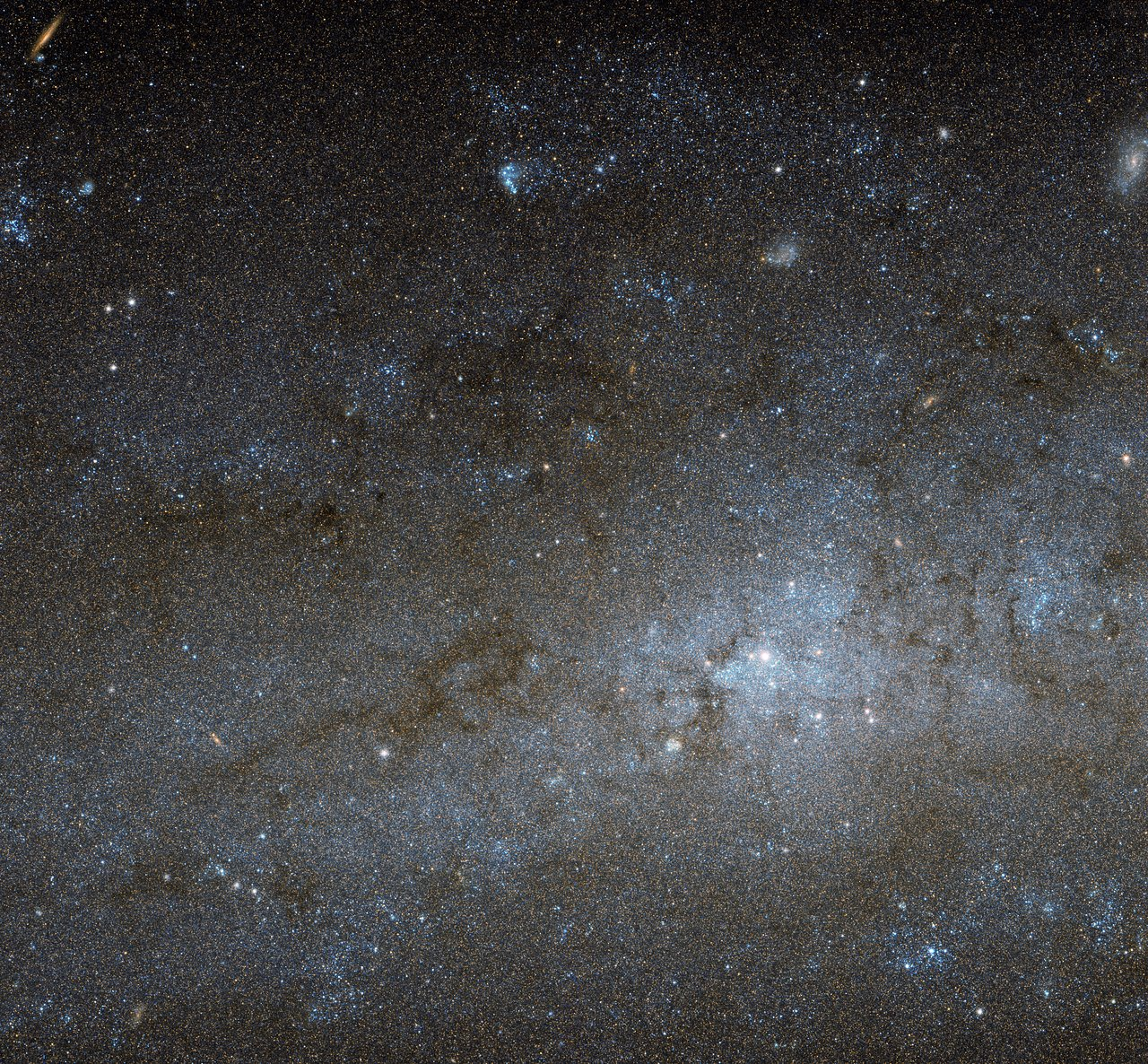
Center of NGC 247 imaged by the Hubble Space Telescope.

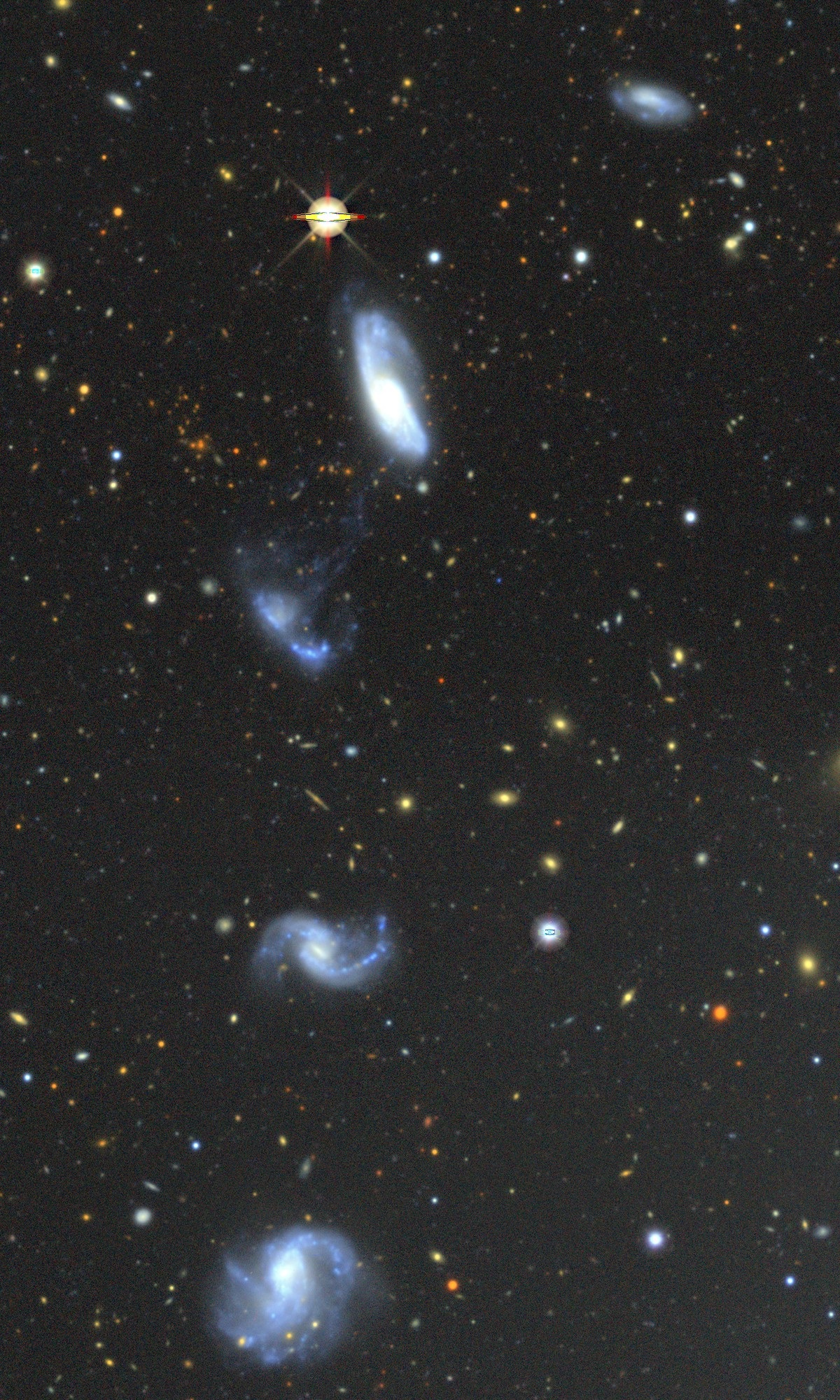
Burbidge's Chain imaged by the Legacy Surveys DR10

== See also ==
- List of NGC objects (1–1000)
- Markarian's Chain
