= NGC 4461 =

Galaxy in the constellation Virgo

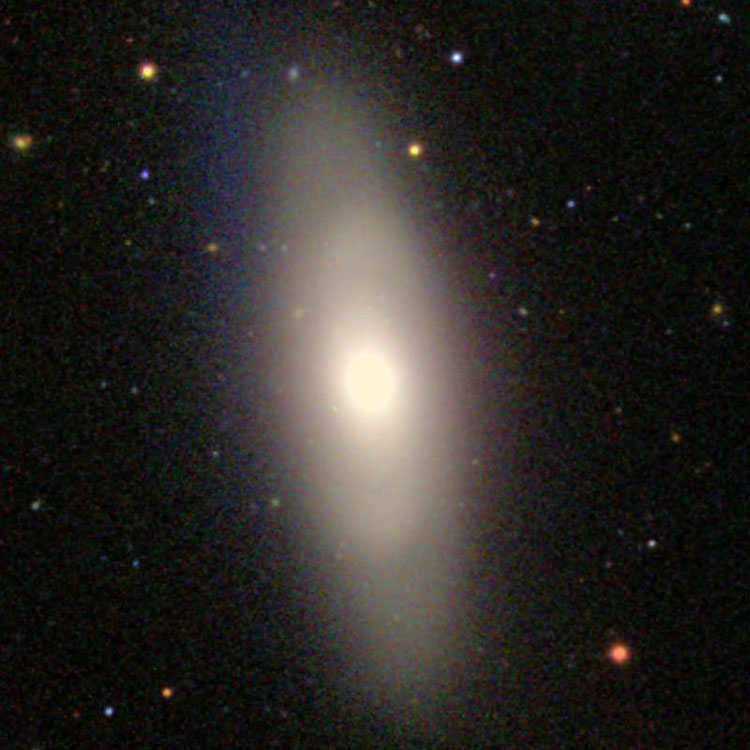
- NGC 4461

Observation data (J2000 epoch)
- Constellation: Virgo
- Right ascension: 12^{h} 29^{m} 03.0^{s}
- Declination: 13° 11′ 02″
- Redshift: 0.006418/1924 km/s
- Distance: 48,277,600 ly
- Group or cluster: Virgo Cluster
- Apparent magnitude (V): 12.09

Characteristics
- Type: SB0^+(s)
- Size: ~ 50,561 ly
- Apparent size (V): 3.5 x 1.4

Other designations
- NGC 4443, PGC 41111, UGC 7613, VCC 1158

NGC 4461 (also known as NGC 4443) is a lenticular galaxy located about 50 million light-years away in the constellation of Virgo. It was discovered by astronomer William Herschel on April 12, 1784. NGC 4461 is a member of Markarian's Chain which is part of the Virgo Cluster.

== Interaction with NGC 4458 ==
NGC 4461 is in a pair with the nearby galaxy NGC 4458. It has undergone a tidal interaction with NGC 4458.

== See also ==
- List of NGC objects (4001–5000)
- M86
