= Samsung Welstory =

South Korean food services company

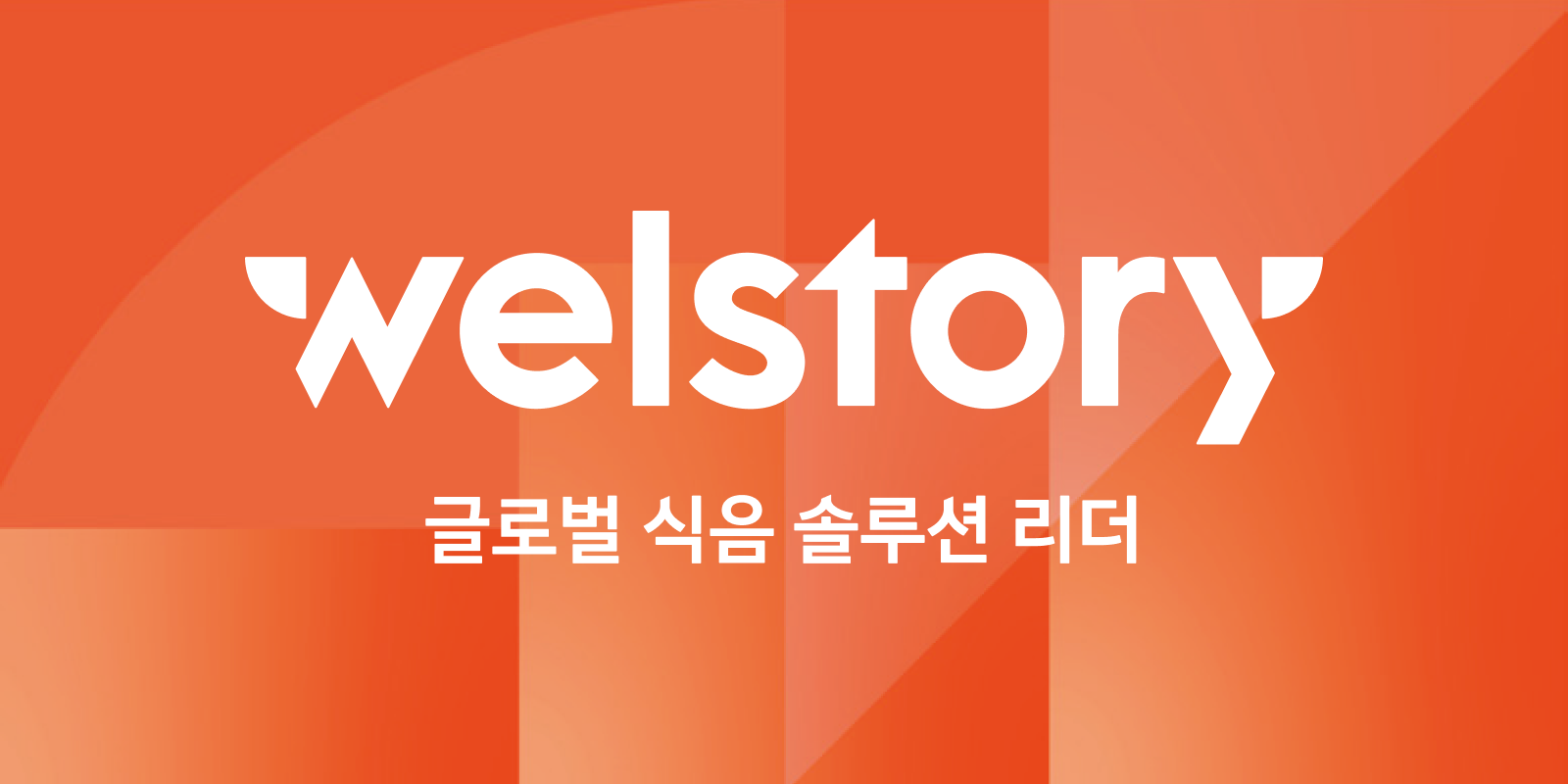
- Native name: 삼성웰스토리
- Headquarters: Seongnam, South Korea
- Key people: Song Kue-jong (CEO)
- Number of employees: 6,772 (2024)
- Parent: Samsung C&T

Samsung Welstory (Korean: 삼성웰스토리) is a South Korean food services company founded in 2013. It is a subsidiary of Samsung C&T and has provided services to other Samsung affiliates including Samsung Electronics, Samsung Display, Samsung Electro-Mechanics, and Samsung SDI.

== History ==
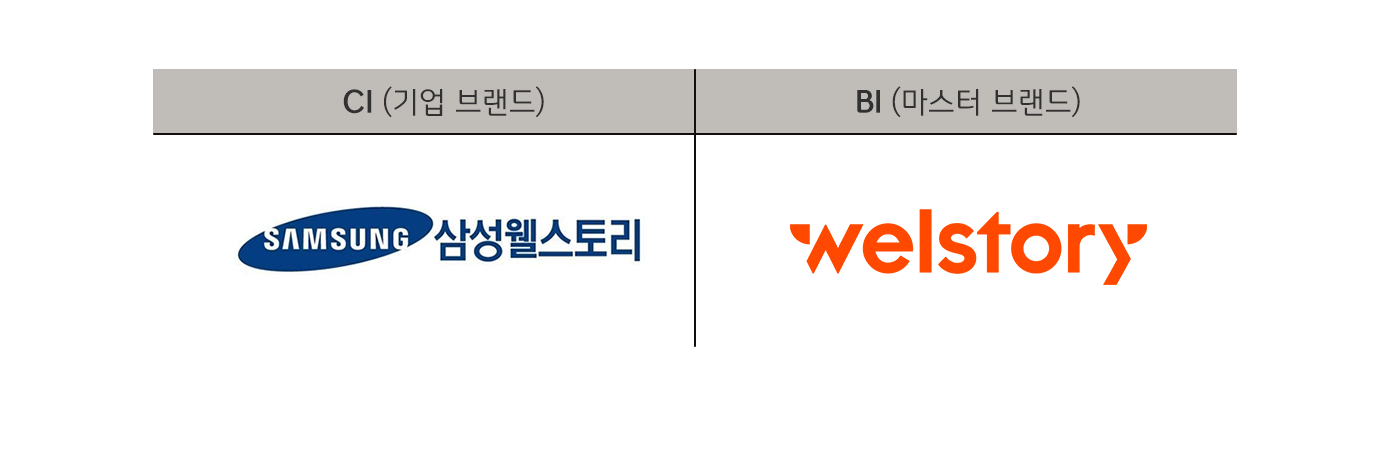
A side-by-side of Samsung Welstory logos for corporate or consumer-facing situations, introduced in 2024.

Samsung's food services operations date back to 1982, while the Welstory brand was launched in 2007. The 'Samsung Welstory' entity was spun-off from Samsung Everland in 2013 after its merger with Cheil Industries. Cheil merged with C&T the year after. In 2014, a Vietnamese subsidiary was established. A Chinese distribution joint venture by the name of ‘Shanghai Welstory’ was established in 2016, with a Japanese wholesaler and Chinese supplier taking minority stakes.

In 2021, four Samsung affiliates were fined KRW 234.9 billion by the Fair Trade Commission for its deals with Welstory, which did not involve open bidding and inflated the value of the services. The FTC rejected the companies' remedy plan. Investigators from the Seoul Central District Prosecutors Office raided the headquarters of Welstory and Samsung Electronics in 2022 as part of the probe.

In March 2024, Welstory launched its Wellybot service, featuring a cooking robot that could produce "stews and soups for high-volume meal services." In October, Welstory signed a memorandum of understanding with Louetlang to expand its presence in Europe. In April 2026, the Seoul High Court overturned the FTC's Welstory-related fines due to insufficient evidence.
