= GLXY =

South Korean fashion brand

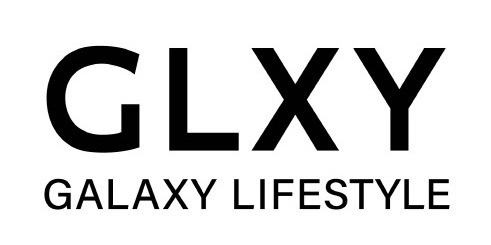
- Industry: Clothing, Accessories
- Headquarters: Seoul, South Korea
- Key people: Oh Se-cheol (CEO)
- Products: Suit, Accessories
- Parent: Samsung C&T Corporation
- Website: https://www.samsungcnt.com/

GLXY, also called Galaxy Lifestyle, is a South Korean menswear brand owned by Samsung C&T Corporation. It began in 1983 as the casual line of the menswear suit brand GALAXY, and later evolved into a brand encompassing the diverse daily lifestyles and activities of modern urban men.

== History ==
GLXY was launched in 1983 as the casual line of the menswear brand GALAXY. Since then, the brand has expanded its scope and repositioned itself in response to changes in the men's casual and business casual market.

In the 1990s, as demand for casual apparel increased, the brand shifted from a suit-oriented image toward a city casual concept. From the 2000s onward, it adjusted its brand composition in line with the growth of the business casual and lifestyle markets.

In the 2020s, the brand reorganized its direction in response to changes in consumer environments, including the expansion of remote and hybrid work arrangements, and in 2025 changed its brand identity (BI) to “GLXY” and introduced a new logo reflecting the brand's renewed identity.

== See also ==
- Samsung C&T Corporation
- GALAXY
