= Galaxy (brand) =

South Korean fashion brand

GALAXY
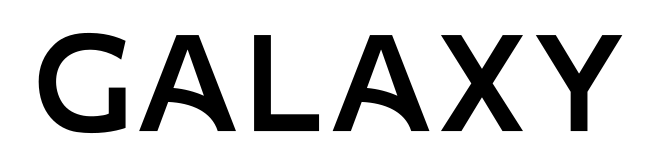
- Industry: Men's clothing
- Headquarters: Seoul, South Korea
- Key people: Oh Se-cheol (CEO)
- Products: Suit, Accessories
- Parent: Samsung C&T Corporation
- Website: https://www.samsungcnt.com/

GALAXY is a men's fashion brand operated by Samsung C&T Corporation. Established in 1983 as a menswear label of Cheil Industries, the brand grew around classic suits and premium menswear.

== History ==
GALAXY was launched in 1983 as a menswear brand of Cheil Industries. At the time, Cheil Industries was one of South Korea's leading textile and fashion companies, expanding into the high-end menswear market through its in-house fabric production and tailoring capabilities. During the 1980s and 1990s, GALAXY gained widespread recognition alongside the growth of the domestic men's suit market, establishing itself as a premium menswear brand focused on classic tailoring and formalwear.

Following the merger of Samsung C&T and Cheil Industries on September 1, 2015, the brand became part of the Fashion Division of Samsung C&T.

GALAXY has supplied official apparel for a variety of international events. These included the President Line commemorating the G20 Seoul Summit, official uniforms for the PyeongChang 2018 Bid Committee and the 2012 Nuclear Security Summit, as well as official teamwear for the 2010 FIFA World Cup, 2014 FIFA World Cup, 2018 FIFA World Cup, and the 2013 World Baseball Classic. In particular, the uniforms produced for the PyeongChang Olympic bid committee and a cashmere blazer gained public attention after being worn at official events by Lee Kun-hee. Although not an official event endorsement, the brand's premium line, Lansmere, also received significant media attention in 2025 when a jacket worn by Lee Jae-yong during a widely reported gathering became a topic of public discussion.

== Products ==
- Men's suits and tailored formalwear
- Business casual apparel
- Jackets and blazers
- Knitwear and shirts
- Outerwear, including coats and seasonal collections
- Premium collections under the Lansmere label

== Brand Ambassadors ==
- Namkoong Won (1980s)
- Richard Gere (1996)
- Han Suk-kyu
- Cha Seung-won (2015)
- Sean O'Pry (2019)
- Josh Hartnett (2023)

== See also ==
- Contemporary culture of South Korea
- Foreign celebrity advertising
- Samsung C&T Corporation
