= NGC 4515 =

Galaxy in the constellation Coma Berenices

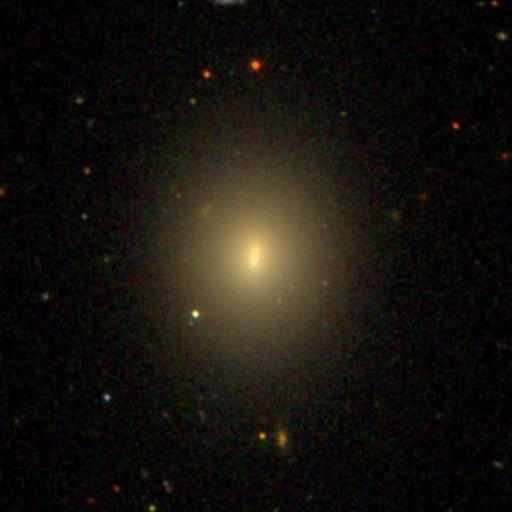
- SDSS image of NGC 4515.

Observation data (J2000 epoch)
- Constellation: Coma Berenices
- Right ascension: 12^{h} 33^{m} 05.0^{s}
- Declination: 16° 15′ 56″
- Redshift: 0.003172/951 km/s
- Distance: 56.7 Mly
- Group or cluster: Virgo Cluster
- Apparent magnitude (V): 13.3

Characteristics
- Type: S0^-
- Size: ~25,350 ly (estimated)
- Apparent size (V): 1.3 x 1.1

Other designations
- PGC 41652, UGC 7701, VCC 1475

NGC 4515 is a lenticular galaxy located about 57 million light-years away in the constellation Coma Berenices. NGC 4515 was discovered by astronomer William Herschel on March 21, 1784. The galaxy is a member of the Virgo Cluster.

== See also ==
- List of NGC objects (4001–5000)
- NGC 4503
