= Aircruise =

Aircruise is a concept hydrogen airship envisioned as the combination of cruise ship and luxury hotel, designed by the UK company Seymourpowell. Its design director is Nick Talbot. It has attracted the attention of Samsung Construction and Trading, for whom a concept video was produced. It was later revealed that the concept was a publicity stunt by Seymourpowell, and nothing like this concept could ever work.

== Specifications ==
The Aircruise would be a solar and hydrogen fuel cell-powered airship. According to its design specifications, it would be 265 m (869 ft) tall containing 330,000 m^{3} (12,000,000 cu ft) of air and would carry a payload of 396 t (390 long tons; 437 short tons). It was "designed" to carry about 100 passengers with a flight crew of 6, 2 of whom are flight engineers, and another 14 supporting staff to look after passengers. The airship will use large Polymer Electrolyte Membrane hydrogen-power fuel cells to power in-flight electricity and drinking water.

It would have glass floors for passengers to view the land and sea beneath.

Its land speed would depend on the wind, but it would supposedly be capable of traveling at 100 to 150 km/h (62 to 93 mph), in calm conditions.

== Critical response ==
The Aircruise concept received generally favourable criticism, much to the embarrassment of reporters when the hoax was revealed. For example, The Daily Telegraph stated that it could herald a new era of luxury travel. Coverage in The Scotsman welcomed it as attractive for its environmental friendliness.

=== Eco friend ===
Ordinary cruise ships release three times as much greenhouse gas as a Boeing 747 per passenger and 36 times as much as the Eurostar. The Aircruise was thus claimed to be an eco friendly alternative, with its zero emission design.
