= NGC 4473 =

Galaxy in the constellation Coma Berenices

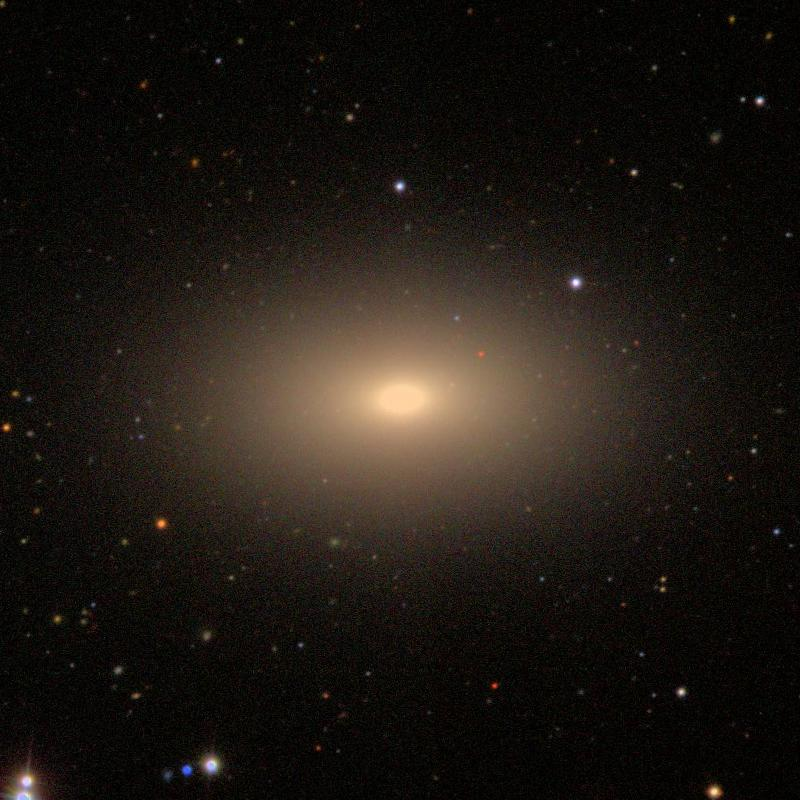
- SDSS image of the elliptical galaxy NGC 4473.

Observation data (J2000 epoch)
- Constellation: Coma Berenices
- Right ascension: 12^{h} 29^{m} 48.9^{s}
- Declination: 13° 25′ 46″
- Redshift: 0.007485
- Heliocentric radial velocity: 2,244 km/s
- Distance: 52.74 Mly (16.17 Mpc)
- Group or cluster: Virgo Cluster
- Apparent magnitude (V): 10.2

Characteristics
- Type: E5
- Size: ~ 68.5 kly (estimated); 21 kpc
- Apparent size (V): 4.5′ × 2.5′

Other designations
- NGC 4473, UGC 7631, MCG 2-32-93, PGC 41228, CGCG 70-125

NGC 4473 is an elliptical galaxy located about 50 million light-years away in the constellation of Coma Berenices. It was discovered by astronomer William Herschel on April 8, 1784. NGC 4473 has an inclination of about 71°. NGC 4473 is a member of a chain of galaxies called Markarian's Chain which is part of the larger Virgo Cluster of galaxies.

== Components ==
NGC 4473 has an estimated population of 376 ± 97 globular clusters. These clusters may have formed from the result of multiple minor mergers that helped form the outer regions of the galaxy. Beside this, NGC 4473 has two counter-rotating stellar discs embedded in the inner regions of the galaxy. They may have formed by either the accretion of gas from outside the galaxy or the mergers of gas-rich galaxies.

== Supermassive black hole ==
Using the HST and spectroscopic data from the ground to measure the motions of stars in the center of NGC 4473, Douglas Richstone and colleagues at the University of Michigan have concluded that the galaxy has a supermassive black hole with an estimated mass of roughly 100 million solar masses (1×10^{8} M_{☉}). Its diameter is estimated to be around 4.459 AU (669 million km).

== See also ==
- List of NGC objects (4001–5000)
- Messier 87
- M86
- NGC 4550 - Lenticular galaxy in the Virgo Cluster experiencing counter-rotation

== Gallery ==
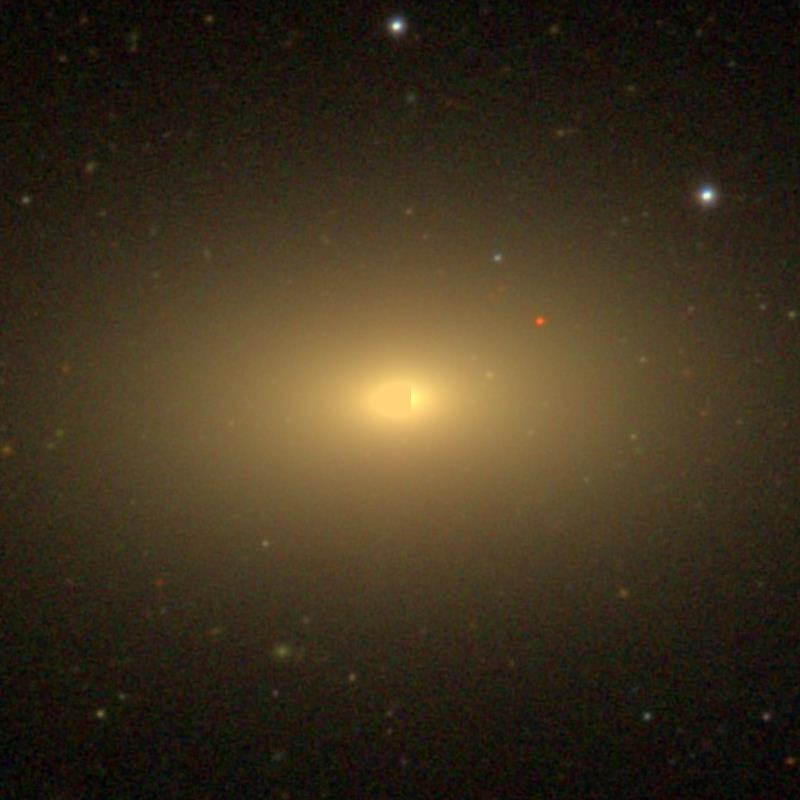
NGC 4473 (SDSS)

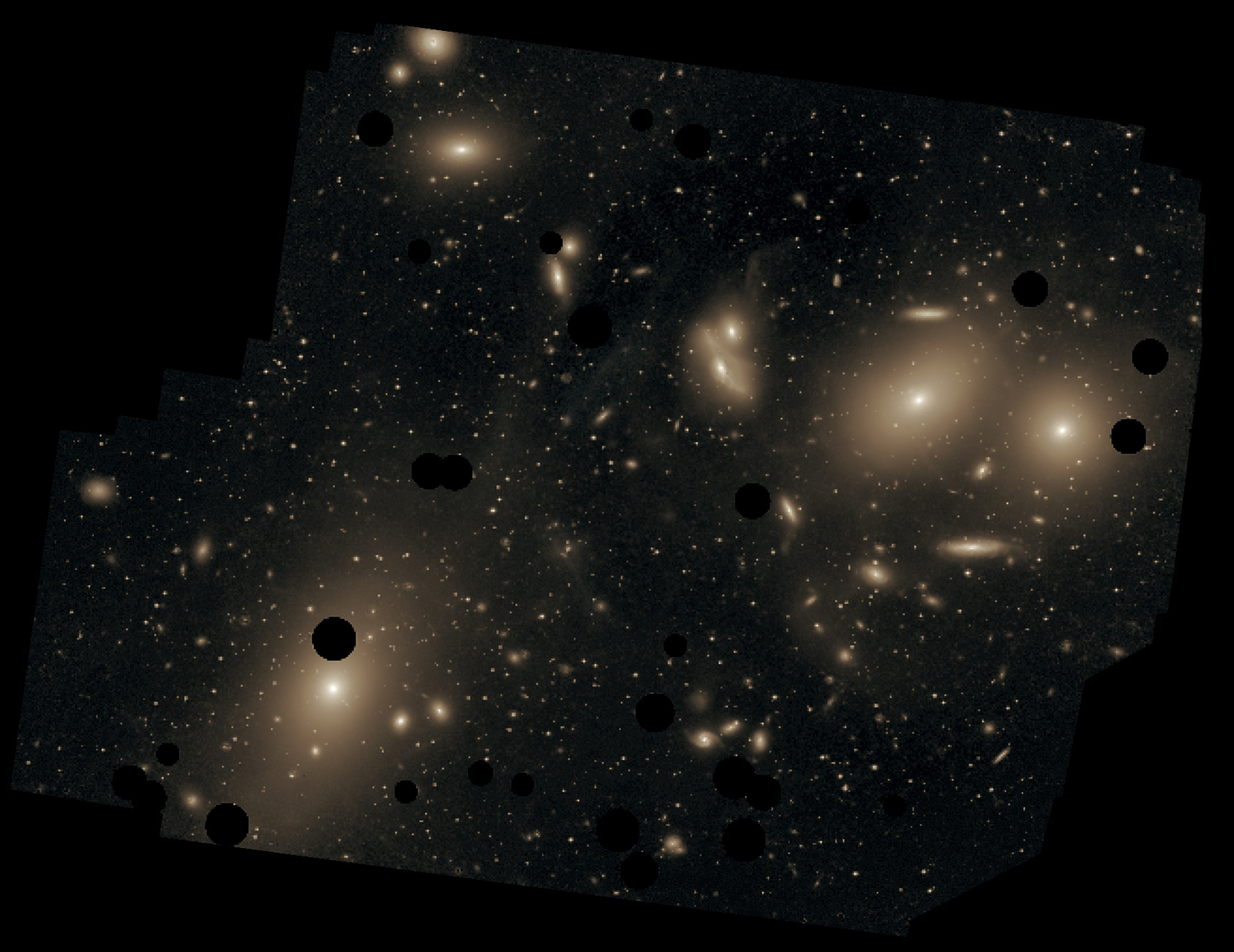
NGC 4473 in Virgo Cluster

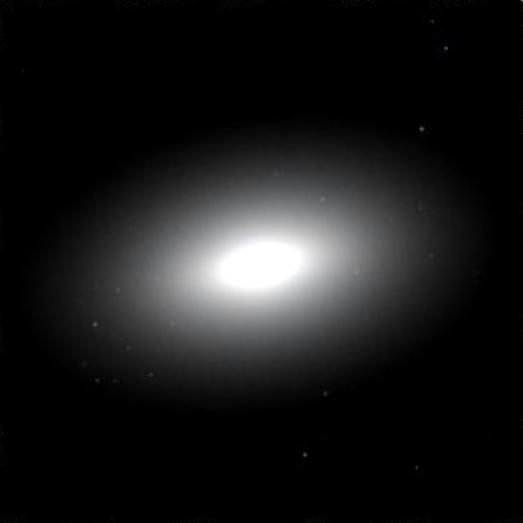
HST image of NGC 4473
