= Reign (store) =

- Company type: Private
- Industry: Fashion
- Headquarters: New York City, New York, U.S.
- Key people: Santino LoConte (Founder)
- Products: Clothing, footwear, accessories
- Website: reign.co

Reign is a fashion retailer and online store based in Manhattan. It was founded in 2017 and sells a mix of fashion products consisting of ready to wear, footwear, and accessories for men and women.

== History ==
The company was founded in 2017by Santino LoConte, the former head of global product collaborations at Pony. That year, it opened up a 1600 sq. ft. retail store in New York, as part of a strategic partnership with Samsung C&T Fashion Group. In 2018, Reign opened a shop-in-shop location at the 10 Corso Como New York store.
