= Bean Pole =

South Korean fashion brand

BEANPOLE
- Industry: Apparel, accessories
- Founded: 1989
- Headquarters: Dogok, Seoul, South Korea
- Key people: Park Chul Gyu
- Products: Clothing, accessories, sports
- Parent: Samsung C&T Corporation
- Website: beanpole.com

Bean Pole is a South Korean fashion brand owned by Samsung C&T Corporation. It produces seven sub-brands, including Bean Pole Men, Bean Pole Ladies and Bean Pole Kids; an accessories line, Bean Pole Accessory; a golf wear brand, Bean Pole Golf; and a sports fashion/equipment brand, Bean Pole Sports. Towards the end of 2019 they added 890311 to their list of sub-brands.

== Background ==
Bean Pole was founded in 1989 by Cheil Industries (now merged into Samsung C&T Corporation). At the time, it was marketed as a "neo-contemporary total fashion brand" for men aged 25-35. In 1993, it enacted a no sales policy to strengthen consumer trust for domestic brands, which at the time were mid-to-low priced. From its launch to 1996, it recorded an average yearly sales growth of 30%, and by 2000 it had the highest market share out of all of the country's "traditional casual" brands. Even throughout a surge of casual brands in the 1990s, Bean Pole saw continued success, which was attributed to its high quality clothing and fulfillment of customer needs. However, it, and other "masstige" (a combination of the words "mass" and "prestige") brands began to decline with the rise of fast fashion and designer clothing.

In 2019, Bean Pole announced that it would undergo a rebrand for its 30th anniversary, to be shown in the 2020 spring/summer season. The sub-brand 890311 was founded, which featured items inspired by "the industrialization period of the 1960s and 1970s when Western culture began to permeate Korean society." The company also expressed plans to expand into foreign markets like Vietnam and North America.

=== Logo ===
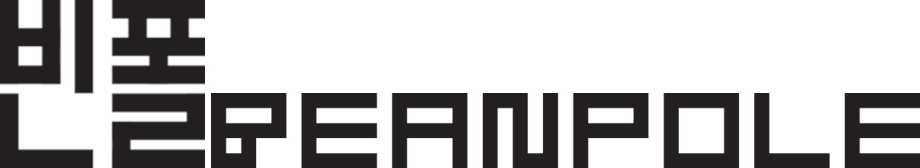
Bean Pole's hangul logo, created in 2019

A depiction of the adjustments made to the Bean Pole logo over the years

Since its establishment, Bean Pole has continuously adjusted its logo, making minor changes. Some of the most obvious changes can be found in the company’s new logos in 2019. Bean Pole has made a new Hangeul logo using its brand identity and distinctive design.

== Stores ==
A flagship store was opened in Myeong-dong, Seoul, in 2003, the first for a South Korean brand. The four-floor building featured shops for its Bean Pole Jeans, Ladies, Golf, Homme, and Kids brands. The choice to open a flagship store, as said by company CEO Won Jong-woon, was because "department stores are divided into men's and women's clothing and children's clothing floors, so it is difficult to show the entire product with a consistent image. With this Bean Pole Chungmuro standalone store, one-stop shopping has become possible." A second flagship store was opened in Daegu in 2009.

== Partnerships and collaborations ==
Bean Pole have collaborated with foreign designers since 2010. That year, Scott Steinberg, designer for Band of Outsiders, joined with the brand to create a capsule collection. For the spring/summer season of 2011, Bean Pole worked with English designer Kim Jones; their collaboration continued through the fall/winter season. Following their collaborations with Jones, Bean Pole worked with then-Hermès womenswear director Christophe Lemaire to create the menswear line Novö.

== See also ==
- Contemporary culture of South Korea
- Foreign celebrity advertising
