= ROGATIS =

South Korean fashion brand

- Industry: Clothing, Accessories
- Founded: 1979
- Headquarters: Dogok, Seoul, South Korea
- Key people: Oh Se-cheol (CEO)
- Products: Suit, Accessories
- Parent: Samsung C&T Corporation
- Website: https://www.samsungcnt.com/

ROATIS is a South Korean fashion brand owned by Samsung C&T Corporation. Since its launch in 1979, it has established itself as one of the representative brands in South Korea’s men’s suit and contemporary fashion market. Initially introduced as a traditional suit-focused label, the brand later expanded its scope by incorporating casual elements and functional design features. The brand name is derived from the name of Italian-American modelist Vincent De Rogatis.

== Products ==
- Men’s suits (suits, smart suits)
- Set-up wear (jacket and pants sets)
- Casual wear (jumpers, knitwear, pants, etc.)
- Coats and outerwear
- Tailoring and sizing services

== Brand Ambassadors ==
- 1994 - 1996 : Oh Se-hoon
- 1997 - 1999 : Yoo Dong-geun
- 1999 - 2006 : Cha In-pyo
- 2006 - 2007 : Jung Woo-sung
- 2007 - 2008 : Mathias Lauridsen
- 2009 : Han Chae-young
- 2010 - 2012 : Jang Dong-gun
- 2013 - 2016 : Hyun Bin
- 2015 : Jun Hyun-moo
- 2017 : Just Jerk
- 2023 : Kim Ji-seok
- 2025 : Jung Sung-il

== See also ==
- Contemporary culture of South Korea
- Foreign celebrity advertising
- Samsung C&T Corporation
