= NGC 4733 =

Galaxy in the constellation Virgo

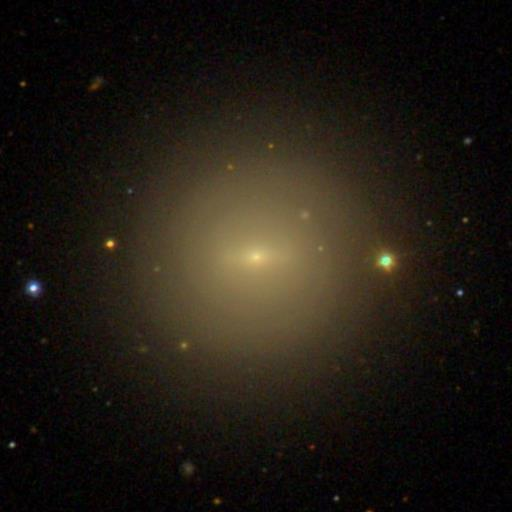
- SDSS image of NGC 4733.

Observation data (J2000 epoch)
- Constellation: Virgo
- Right ascension: 12^{h} 51^{m} 06.8^{s}
- Declination: 10° 54′ 43″
- Redshift: 0.003085/925 km/s
- Distance: 55,454,000 ly
- Group or cluster: Virgo Cluster
- Apparent magnitude (V): 12.7

Characteristics
- Type: SB(rs)0^0^
- Size: ~28,901.32 ly (estimated)
- Apparent size (V): 1.67 x 1.60

Other designations
- CGCG 71-54, MCG 2-33-28, PGC 43516, UGC 7997, VCC 2087

NGC 4733 is a barred lenticular galaxy located about 55 million light-years away in the constellation of Virgo. NGC 4733 was discovered by astronomer William Herschel on March 15, 1784. NGC 4733 is a member of the Virgo Cluster.

== See also ==
- List of NGC objects (4001–5000)
- NGC 4477
- NGC 4620
