= Pleomax =

Defunct consumer electronics brand

Pleomax was a brand that was previously part of the Samsung C&T Corporation. Its products range from PC accessories, storage media to batteries.The brand was first launched in 2004. The brand changed ownership to Eofficekorea, and became defunct in 2024.

== See also ==
- Samsung C&T Corporation
