= NGC 4482 =

Galaxy in the constellation of Virgo

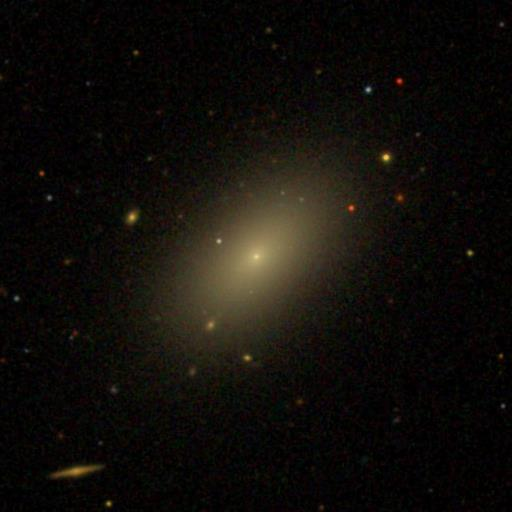
- SDSS image of NGC 4482.

Observation data (J2000 epoch)
- Constellation: Virgo
- Right ascension: 12^{h} 30^{m} 10.3^{s}
- Declination: 10° 46′ 46″
- Redshift: 0.006241/1871 km/s
- Distance: 58.7 Mly
- Group or cluster: Virgo Cluster
- Apparent magnitude (V): 13.9

Characteristics
- Type: dE5
- Size: ~30,450 ly (estimated)
- Apparent size (V): 1.41 x 0.84

Other designations
- IC 3427, CGCG 70-130, MCG 2-32-98, PGC 41272, UGC 7640, VCC 1261

NGC 4482 is a dwarf elliptical galaxy located about 60 million light-years away in the constellation Virgo. NGC 4482 was discovered by astronomer William Herschel on March 15, 1784. It was rediscovered by astronomer Arnold Schwassmann on September 6, 1900 and was listed as IC 3427. It is a member of the Virgo Cluster.

== See also ==
- List of NGC objects (4001–5000)
- Messier 32
- NGC 4458
