= NGC 4479 =

Galaxy in the constellation Coma Berenices

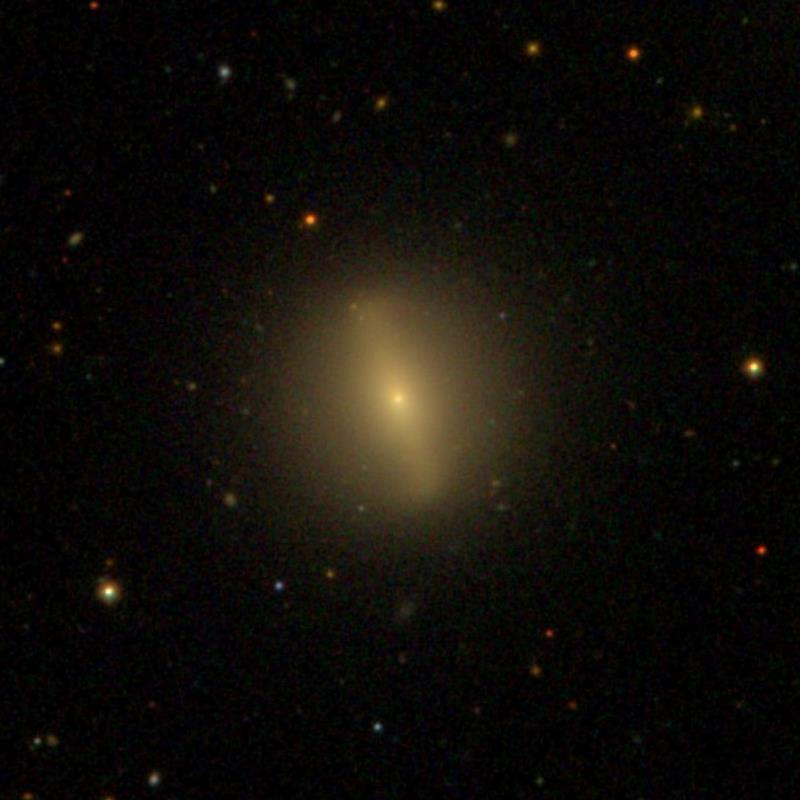
- NGC 4479 by SDSS

Observation data (J2000 epoch)
- Constellation: Coma Berenices
- Right ascension: 12^{h} 30^{m} 18.4^{s}
- Declination: 13° 34′ 40″
- Redshift: 0.002922/876 km/s
- Distance: 59.7 Mly
- Group or cluster: Virgo Cluster
- Apparent magnitude (V): 13.4

Characteristics
- Type: SB0^0(s)
- Size: ~26,860 ly (estimated)
- Apparent size (V): 1.38 x 1.10

Other designations
- CGCG 70-134, MCG 2-32-100, PGC 41302, UGC 7646, VCC 1283

NGC 4479 is a barred lenticular galaxy located about 60 million light-years away in the constellation of Coma Berenices. NGC 4479 was discovered by astronomer William Herschel on April 8, 1784. It is a member of the Virgo Cluster.

== See also ==
- List of NGC objects (4001–5000)
- NGC 4477
