= Kiangsu-Chekiang College =

Kiangsu-Chekiang College may refer to:

- Kiangsu-Chekiang College (Kwai Chung), secondary school in Kwai Chung, Hong Kong
- Kiangsu-Chekiang College (Shatin), secondary school in Shatin, Hong Kong
- Kiangsu-Chekiang College, International Section, secondary school in Braemar Hill, North Point, Hong Kong
