= NGC 4762 =

Lenticular galaxy in the constellation Virgo

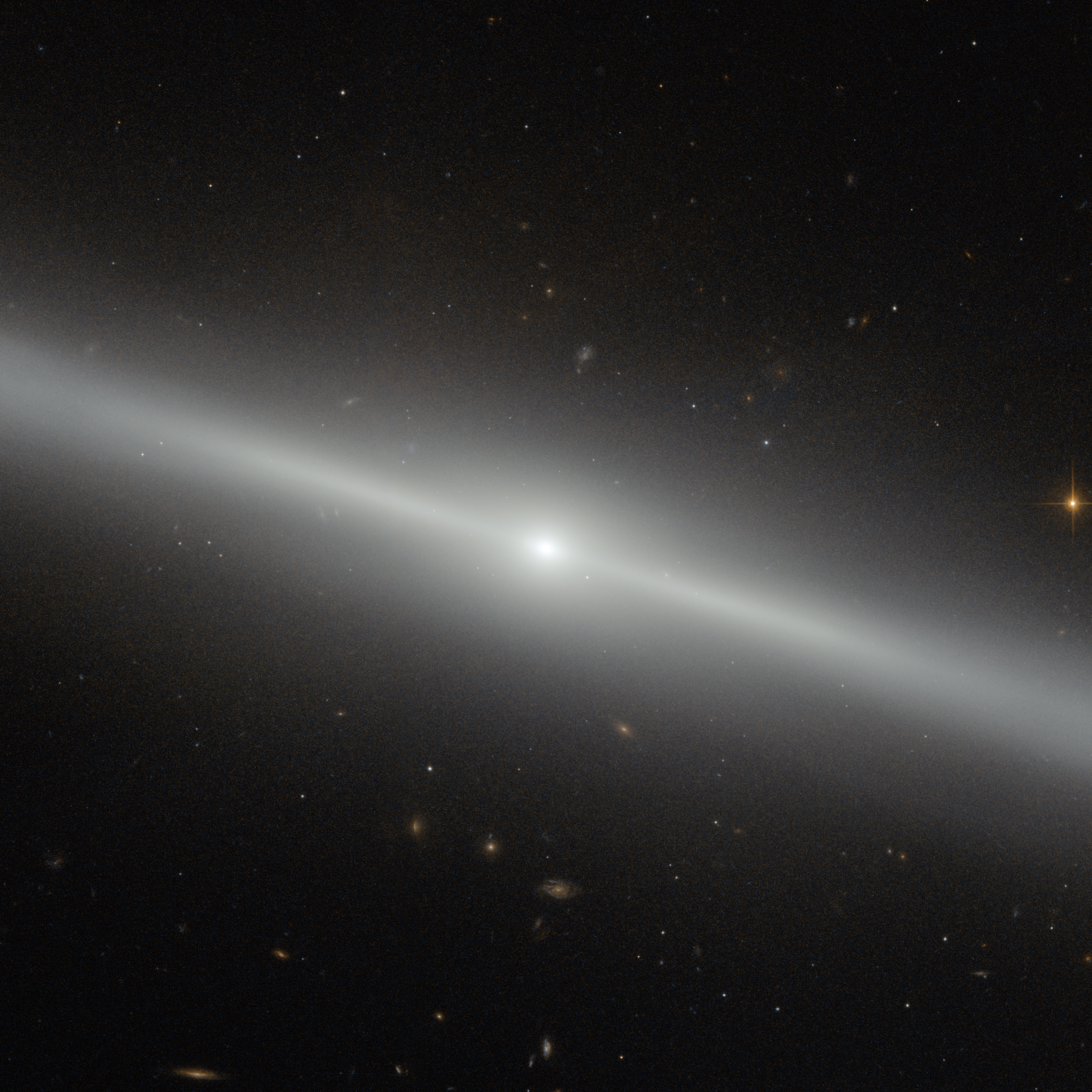
- NGC 4762 by Hubble Space Telescope.

Observation data (J2000 epoch)
- Constellation: Virgo
- Right ascension: 12^{h} 52^{m} 56.05^{s}
- Declination: +11° 13′ 51″
- Redshift: 986 ± 5 km/s
- Distance: 58 Mly (17.8 Mpc)
- Group or cluster: Virgo Cluster
- Apparent magnitude (V): 11.12

Characteristics
- Type: SB(r)0^0^, LINER
- Apparent size (V): 8.7′ × 1.7′

Other designations
- UGC 8016, PGC 43733, VCC 2095

NGC 4762, also known as the Paper-Kite Galaxy, is an edge-on lenticular galaxy in the constellation Virgo. It is at a distance of 60 million light years and is a member of the Virgo Cluster. The edge-on view of this particular galaxy, originally considered to be a barred spiral galaxy, makes it difficult to determine its true shape, but it is considered that the galaxy consists of four main components — a central bulge, a bar, a thick disc and an outer ring. The galaxy's disc is asymmetric and warped, which could be explained by NGC 4762 merging with a smaller galaxy in the past. The remains of this former companion may then have settled within NGC 4762's disc, redistributing the gas and stars and so changing the disc's morphology.

NGC 4762 contains a Liner-type active galactic nucleus, a highly energetic central region. This nucleus is detectable due to its particular spectral line emission, allowing astronomers to measure the composition of the region.

NGC 4762 forms a non-interacting pair with the galaxy NGC 4754.

== Gallery ==
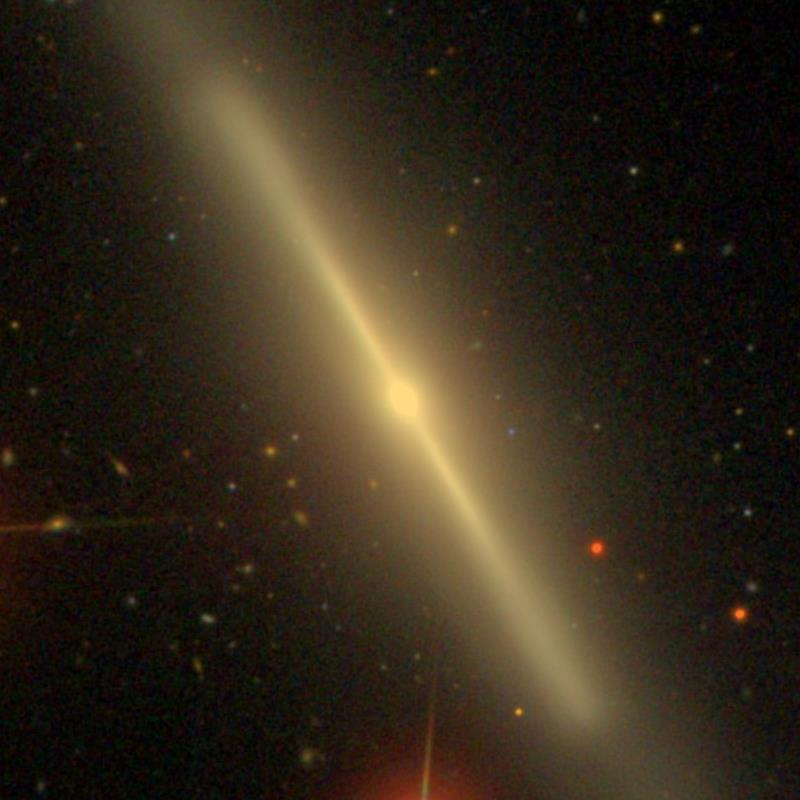
SDSS image of NGC 4762

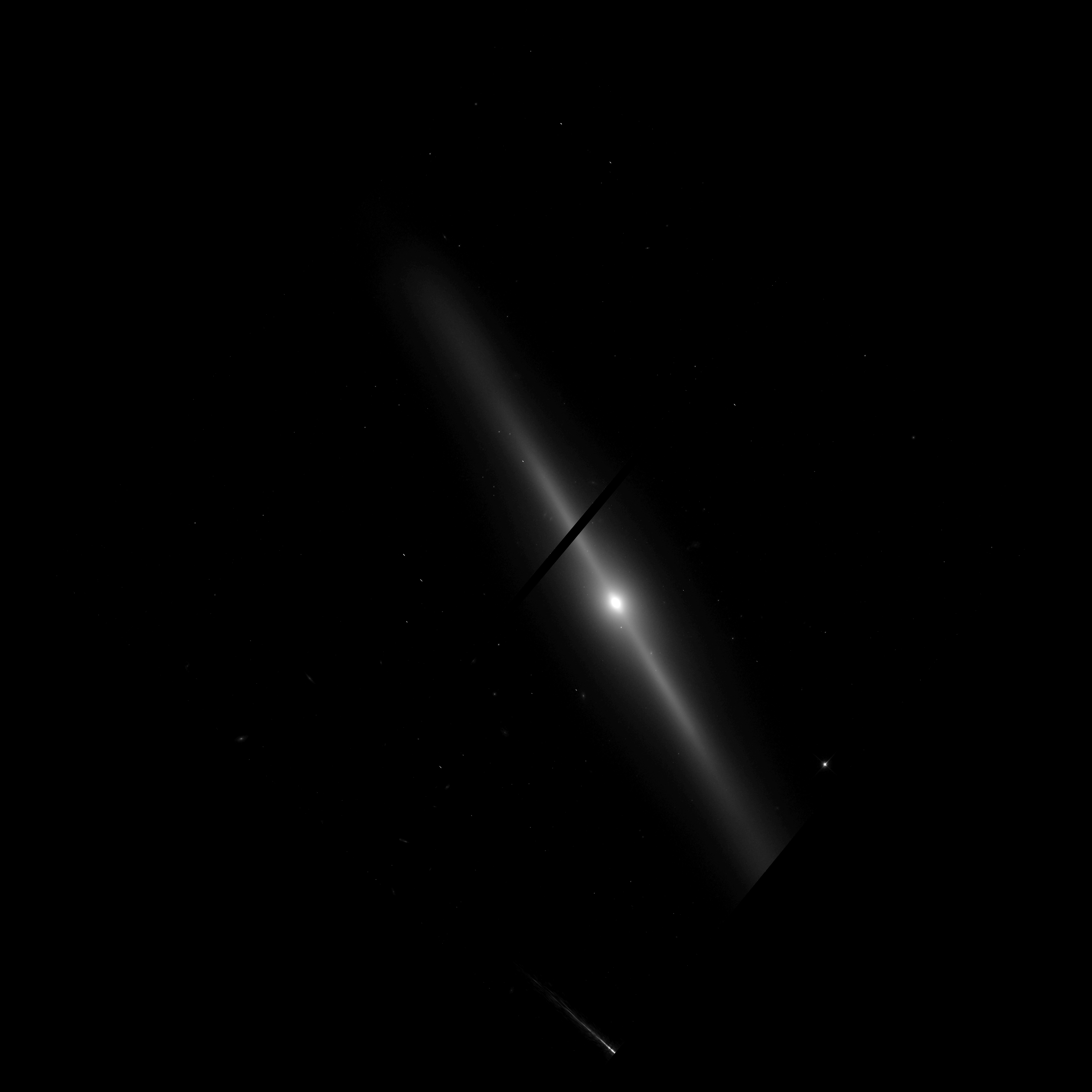
HST image of NGC 4762
