= Eyes Galaxies =

Pair of galaxies in the constellation Virgo

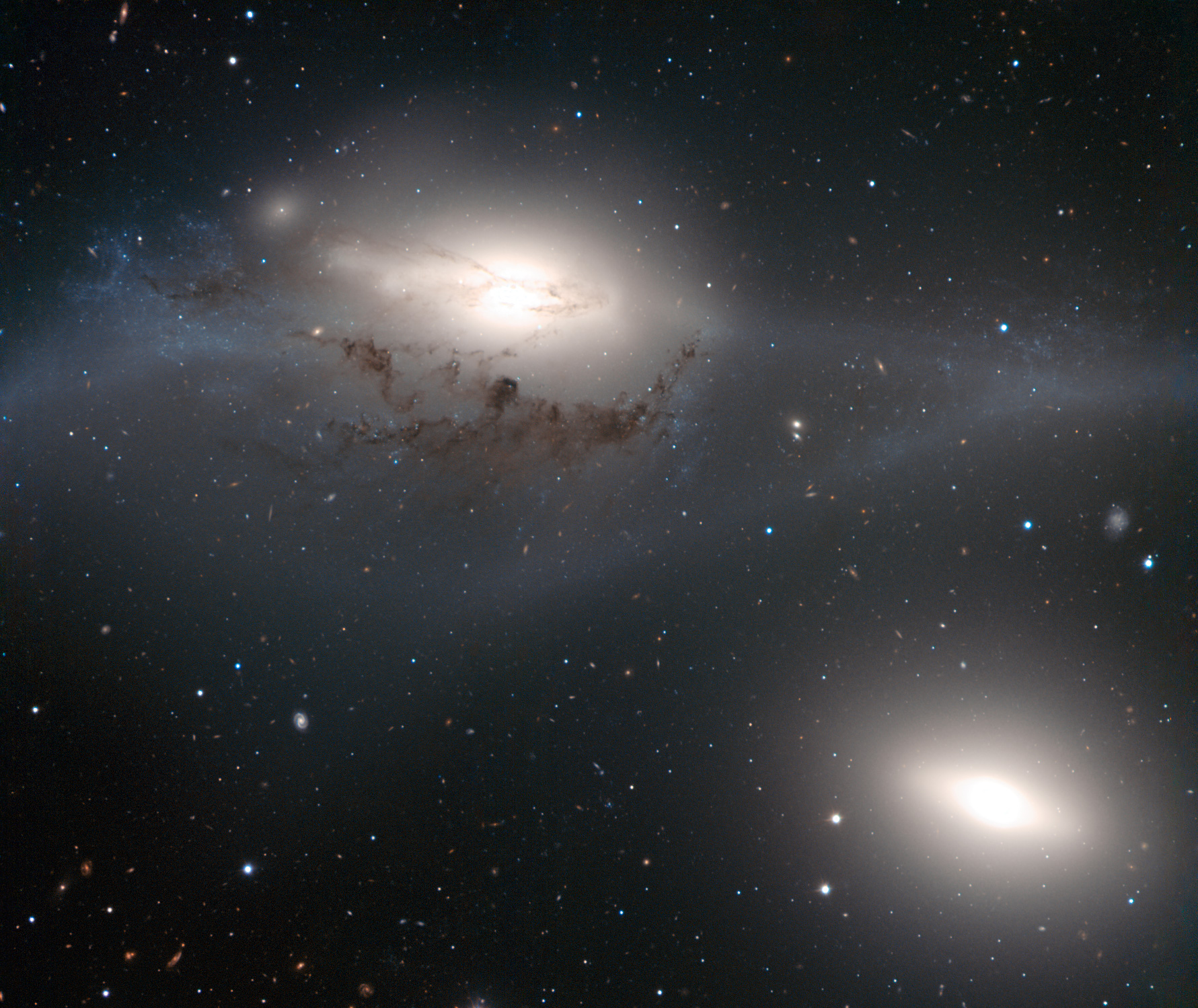
- NGC 4438 (top) and NGC 4435 (bottom) taken by the FORS2 instrument of the Very Large Telescope in 2011

Observation data (J2000.0 epoch)
- Constellation: Virgo
- Right ascension: 12^{h} 27^{m} 45.6^{s}
- Declination: +13° 00′ 31″
- Redshift: 0.002638/0.000237
- Distance: 52 Mly (16 Mpc)
- Apparent magnitude (V): +10.8/10.0
- Absolute magnitude (V): 12

Characteristics
- Type: SB0/SA(s)O/a pec
- Apparent size (V): 3.0′ × 2.2′/8.5′ × 3.0′
- Notable features: Interacting

Other designations
- NGC 4435-8, Arp 120, VV 188 VCC 1030, VCC 1043

The Eyes Galaxies (NGC 4435-NGC 4438, also known as Arp 120) are a pair of galaxies about 52 million light-years away in the constellation Virgo. The pair are members of the string of galaxies known as Markarian's Chain.

== NGC 4435 ==
NGC 4435 is a barred lenticular galaxy currently interacting with NGC 4438. Studies of the galaxy by the Spitzer Space Telescope revealed a relatively young (190 million years) stellar population within the galaxy's nucleus, which may have originated through the interaction with NGC 4438 compressing gas and dust in that region, triggering a starburst. It also appears to have a long tidal tail possibly caused by the interaction; however, other studies suggest the apparent tail is actually foreground galactic cirrus within the Milky Way unrelated to NGC 4435.

== NGC 4438 ==
NGC 4438 is the most curious interacting galaxy in the Virgo Cluster, due to the uncertainty surrounding the energy mechanism that heats the nuclear source; this energy mechanism may be a starburst region, or a black hole-powered active galactic nucleus (AGN). Both hypotheses are currently under investigation by astronomers.

This galaxy shows a highly distorted disk, including long tidal tails due to the gravitational interactions with other galaxies in the cluster and its companion. The aforementioned features explain why sources differ as to its classification, defining it either as a lenticular or spiral galaxy. NGC 4438 also shows signs of a past, extended – but modest – starburst, a considerable deficiency of neutral hydrogen, as well as a displacement of the components of its interstellar medium – atomic hydrogen, molecular hydrogen, interstellar dust, and hot gas – in the direction of NGC 4435. This observation suggests both a tidal interaction with NGC 4435 and the effects of ram-pressure stripping as NGC 4438 moves at high speed through Virgo's intracluster medium, increased by the encounter between both galaxies.

== As interacting galaxies ==
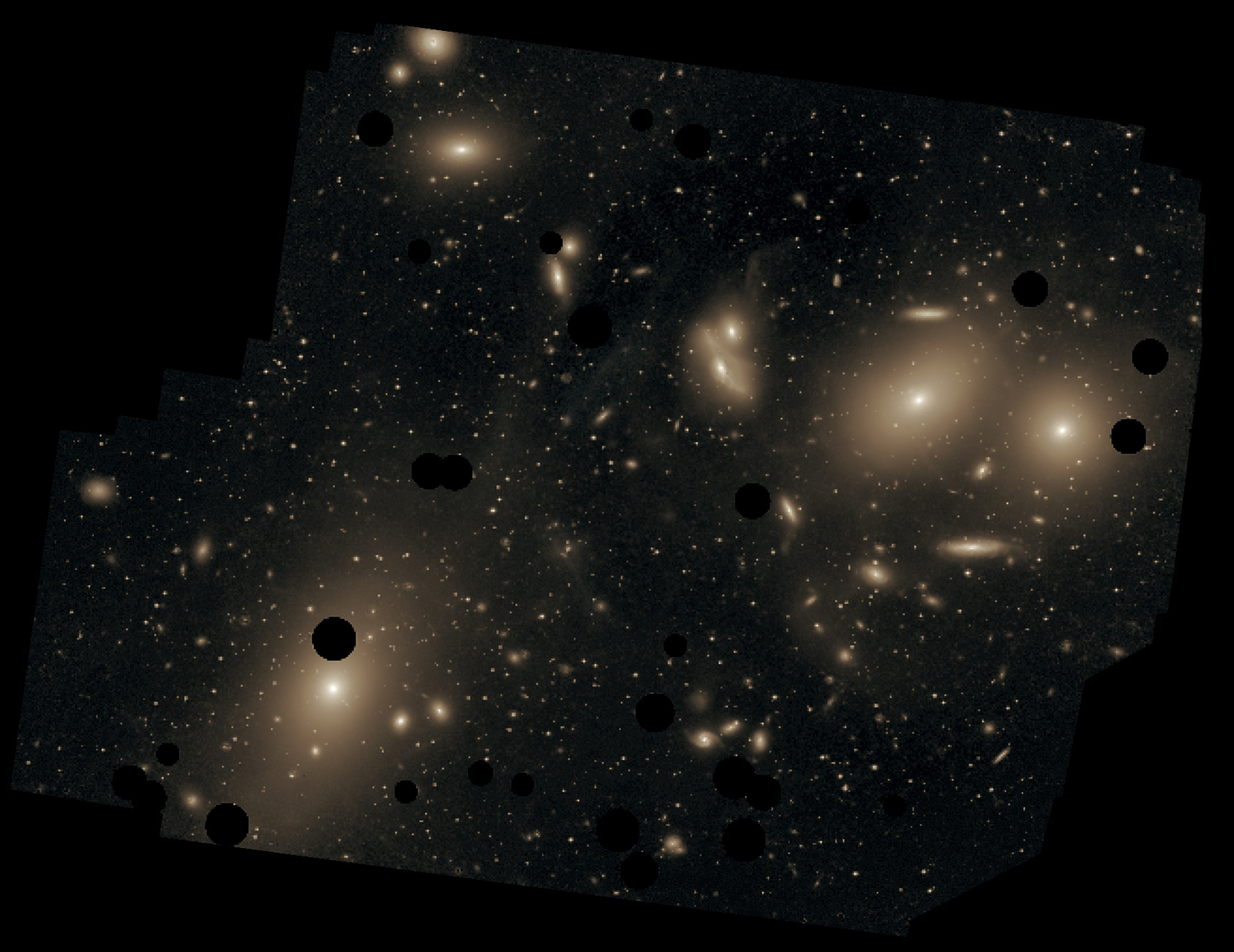
NGC 4435-NGC 4438 in the Virgo Cluster of galaxies

While there is evidence to suggest that the environmental damage to the interstellar medium of NGC 4438 may have been caused by an off-center collision with NGC 4435 millions of years ago, a recent discovery of several filaments of ionized gas links NGC 4438 with the large neighboring elliptical galaxy Messier 86, in addition to a discovery of gas and dust within M86 that may have been stripped from NGC 4438 during a past encounter between the two. Given the high density of galaxies in the center of the Virgo galaxy cluster, it is possible that the three galaxies, NGC 4435, NGC 4438, and M86, have had past interactions.
