= NGC 4620 =

Galaxy in the constellation Virgo

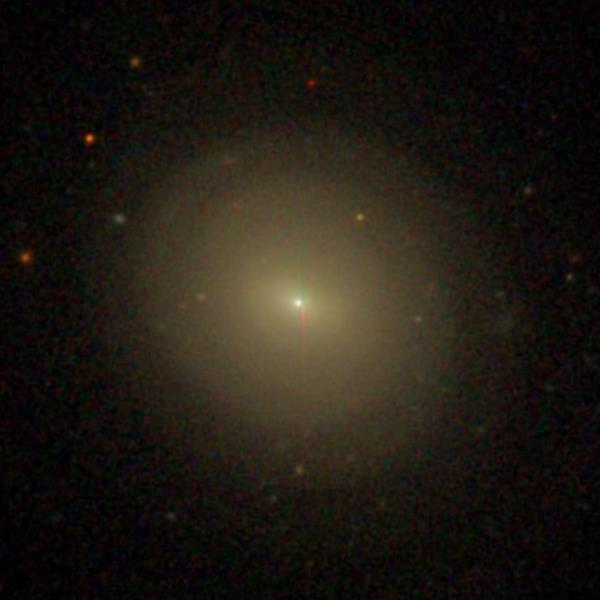
- SDSS image of NGC 4620.

Observation data (J2000 epoch)
- Constellation: Virgo
- Right ascension: 12^{h} 41^{m} 59.3^{s}
- Declination: 12° 56′ 34″
- Redshift: 0.003805/1141 km/s
- Distance: 65,240,000 ly
- Group or cluster: Virgo Cluster
- Apparent magnitude (V): 13.5

Characteristics
- Type: S0
- Size: ~36,469.16 ly (estimated)
- Apparent size (V): 1.59 x 1.23

Other designations
- PGC 42619, UGC 7859, VCC 1902

NGC 4620 is a lenticular galaxy located about 65 million light-years away in the constellation of Virgo. It was discovered by astronomer John Herschel on March 29, 1830. NGC 4620 is a member of the Virgo Cluster.

== See also ==
- List of NGC objects (4001–5000)
- NGC 4733
