= Raemian =

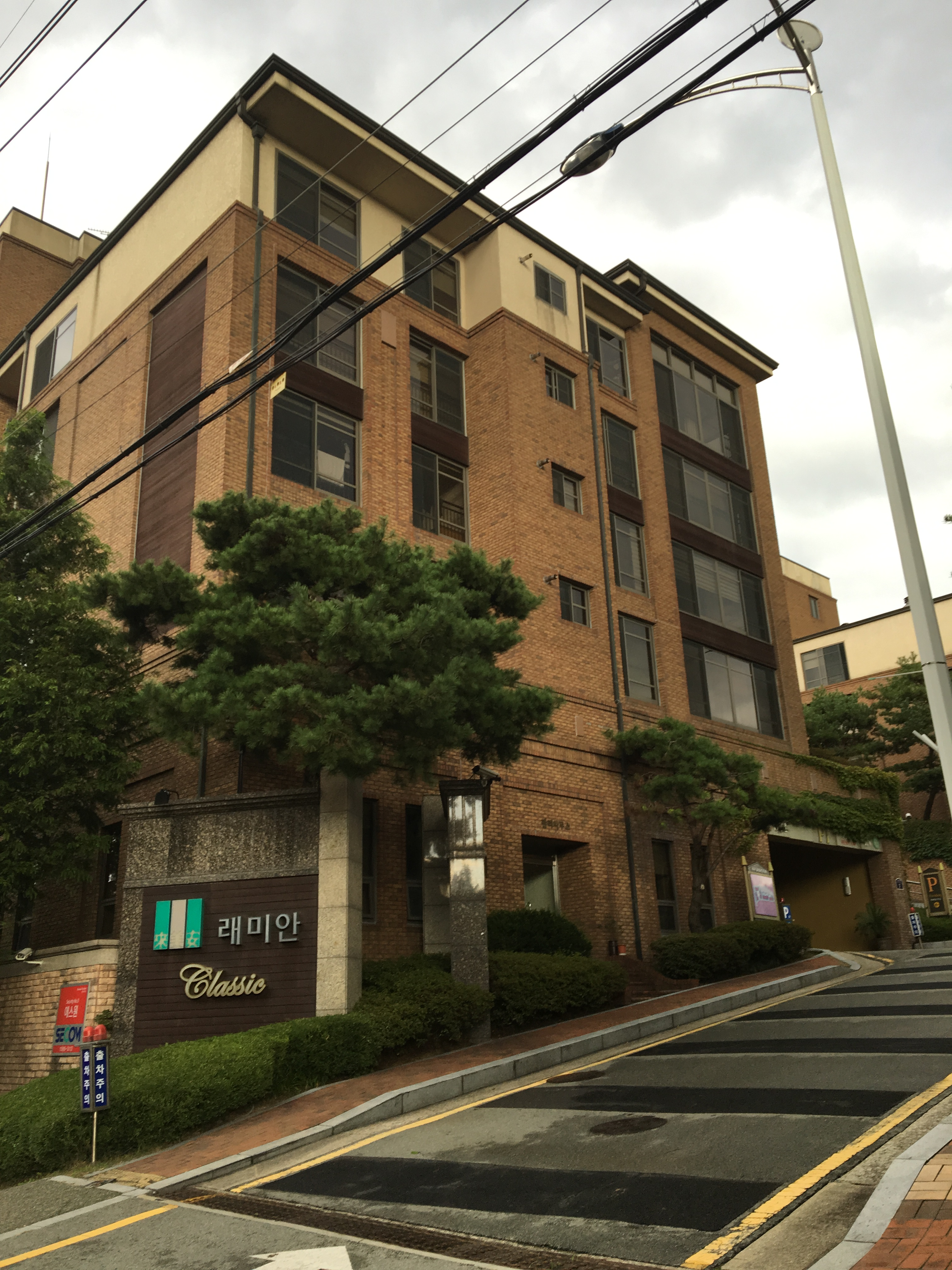
A Raemian building

Raemian (Korean: 래미안, Hanja: 來美安) is a brand of Samsung C&T Engineering & Construction Div. for apartments. Raemian has been ranked No.1 on NCSI (National Customer Satisfaction Index) for apartment construction since 2000.

== See also ==
- Samsung C&T Corporation
