= NGC 4503 =

Galaxy in the constellation of Virgo

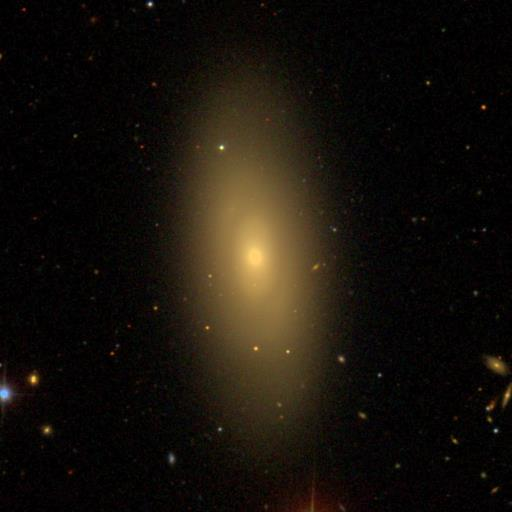
- SDSS image of NGC 4503.

Observation data (J2000 epoch)
- Constellation: Virgo
- Right ascension: 12^{h} 32^{m} 06.2^{s}
- Declination: 11° 10′ 35″
- Redshift: 0.004450/1334 km/s
- Distance: 41.5/74 Mly
- Group or cluster: Virgo Cluster
- Apparent magnitude (V): 12.05

Characteristics
- Type: SB0^-
- Size: ~42,900 ly (13.14 kpc) (estimated)
- Apparent size (V): 3.5 x 1.7

Other designations
- CGCG 70-149, MCG 2-32-118, PGC 41538, UGC 7680, VCC 1412

NGC 4503 is a barred lenticular galaxy located around 41 to 74 million light-years away in the constellation Virgo. NGC 4503 was discovered by astronomer William Herschel on March 15, 1784. NGC 4503 is a member of the Virgo Cluster.

== See also ==
- List of NGC objects (4001–5000)
- NGC 4754
- List of NGC objects
