= NGC 4754 =

Galaxy in the constellation Virgo

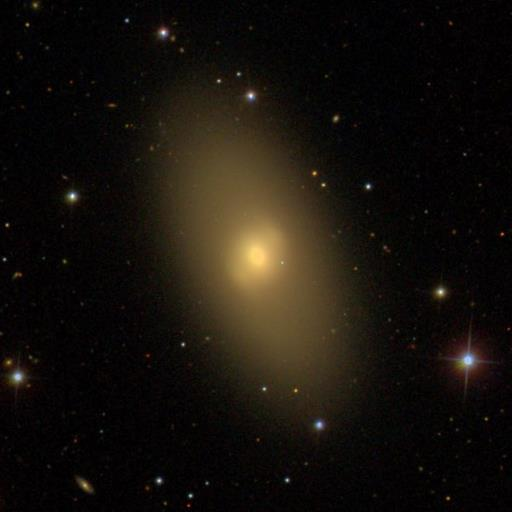
- SDSS image of NGC 4754

Observation data (J2000 epoch)
- Constellation: Virgo
- Right ascension: 12^{h} 52^{m} 17.5^{s}
- Declination: 11° 18′ 50″
- Redshift: 0.004506/1351 km/s
- Distance: 53,017,286 ly
- Group or cluster: Virgo Cluster
- Apparent magnitude (V): 11.52

Characteristics
- Type: SB0^-(r)
- Size: ~70,491.82 ly (estimated)
- Apparent size (V): 4.6 x 2.5

Other designations
- PGC 43656, UGC 8010, VCC 2092

NGC 4754 is a barred lenticular galaxy located about 53 million light-years away in the constellation of Virgo. NGC 4754 was discovered by astronomer William Herschel on March 15, 1784. It forms a non-interacting pair with the edge-on lenticular galaxy NGC 4762. NGC 4754 is a member of the Virgo Cluster.

== See also ==
- List of NGC objects (4001–5000)
- NGC 4477
