= Messier 84 =

Galaxy in the constellation Virgo

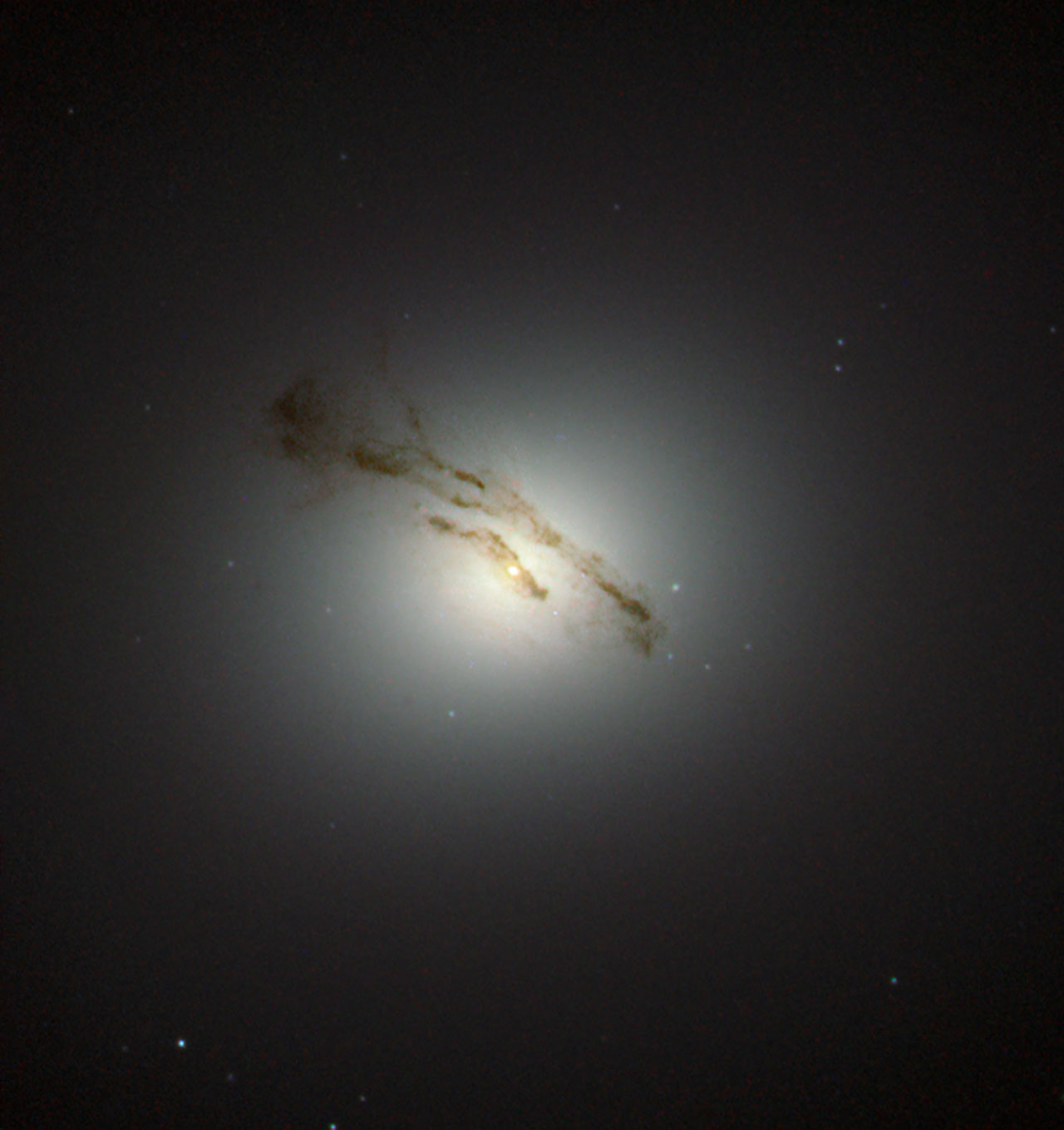
- Galaxy Messier 84 in Virgo, imaged by the Hubble Space Telescope

Observation data (J2000 epoch)
- Constellation: Virgo
- Right ascension: 12^{h} 25^{m} 03.74333^{s}
- Declination: +12° 53′ 13.1393″
- Redshift: 1,060±6 km/s
- Heliocentric radial velocity: 999 km/s
- Distance: 54.9 Mly (16.83 Mpc)
- Apparent magnitude (V): 9.1
- Absolute magnitude (V): −22.41±0.10

Characteristics
- Type: E1
- Apparent size (V): 6.5′ × 5.6′
- Half-light radius (apparent): 72.5″±6″

Other designations
- M84, VCC 763, HOLM 403B, IRAS 12224+1309, 2MASX J12250377+1253130, NGC 4374, UGC 7494, MCG +02-32-034, PGC 40455, CGCG 070-058

Messier 84 or M84, also known as NGC 4374, is a giant elliptical or lenticular galaxy in the constellation Virgo. Charles Messier discovered the object in 1781 (Note: on 18 March) in a systematic search for "nebulous objects" in the night sky. It is the 84th object in the Messier Catalogue and in the heavily populated core of the Virgo Cluster of galaxies, part of the local supercluster.

This galaxy has morphological classification E1, denoting it has flattening of about 10%. The extinction-corrected total luminosity in the visual band is about 7.64×10^{10} L_{☉}. The central mass-to-light ratio is 6.5, which, to a limit, steadily increases away from the core. The visible galaxy is surrounded by a massive dark matter halo.

Radio observations and Hubble Space Telescope images of M84 have revealed two jets of matter shooting out from its center as well as a disk of rapidly rotating gas and stars indicating the presence of a 1.5 ×10^{9} M_{☉} supermassive black hole. It also has a few young stars and star clusters, indicating star formation at a very low rate. The number of globular clusters is 1,775±150, which is much lower than expected for an elliptical galaxy.

Viewed from Earth its half-light radius, relative angular size of its 50% peak of lit zone of the sky, is 72.5″, thus just over an arcminute.

== Supernovae ==
Three supernovae have been observed in M84:

- SN 1957B (Type Ia, mag. 12.5) was discovered by Howard S. Gates on 28 April 1957, and independently by Dr. Giuliano Romano on 18 May 1957.
- SN 1980I (Type Ia, mag. 14) was discovered by M. Rosker on 13 June 1980. Historically, this supernova has been catalogued as belonging to M84, but it may have been in either neighboring galaxy NGC 4387 or M86.
- SN 1991bg (Type Ia-pec, mag. 14) was discovered visually by Reiki Kushida on 9 December 1991. A precovery image showed the supernova was present, at magnitude 14.9, on 3 December 1991. (Note: Some sources use 3 December 1991 as the discovery date.) This supernova has been studied extensively as a peculiar and underluminous Type Ia, and is now used as a template, with similar events being classified as Type Ia-91bg-like.

This high rate of supernovae is rare for elliptical galaxies, which may indicate there is a population of stars of intermediate age in M84.

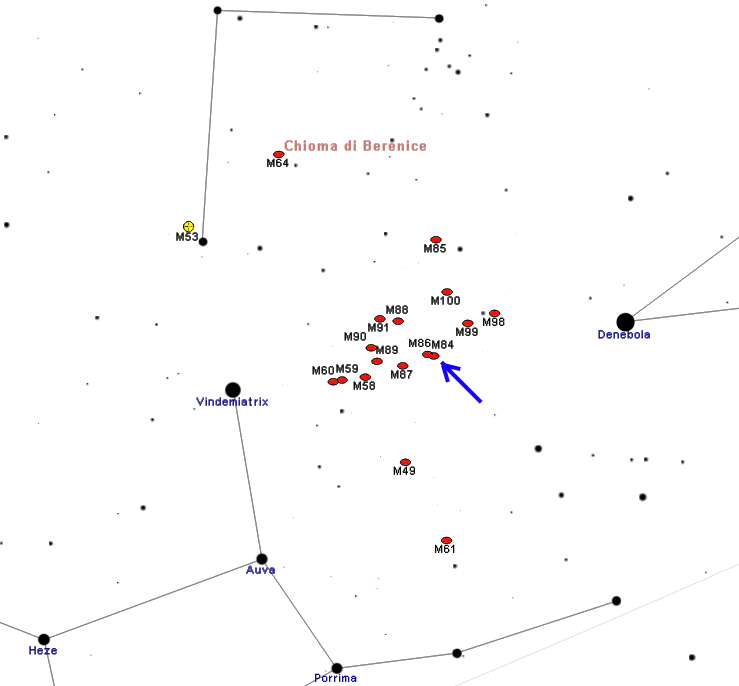
Location of M84

== See also ==
- List of Messier objects
