= Korfbal Combinatie Capelle =

KCC
- Leagues: Korfbal League (indoor), Ereklasse (outdoor)
- Founded: 1 July 1999; 26 years ago
- Location: Capelle aan den IJssel, Netherlands
- President: (Netherlands) Anton van der Heiden
- Head coach: (Netherlands) Henno Ploeg and Wilrik Wassink
- Website: kcconline.nl

Korfbal Combinatie Capelle (KCC), also known under its sponsored name KCC/CK Kozijnen, is a Dutch korfball and boules club located in Capelle aan den IJssel. The club was founded in 1999, from a merger of the korfball clubs AKV De Bermen and CKV De Kapellen.

== History ==
=== 1963–1999: Foundation and merger ===
The areligious AKV De Bermen was founded in 1963. It became the largest korfball cub in members in the Rotterdam region. By 1967, De Bermen already had 11 teams and a new clubhouse.

The Christian CKV De Kapellen was founded on 4 June 1963 and stood out as a smaller korfball club. Just before it merged and disappeared, it won the korfball cup of the Rotterdams Dagblad.

On 1 July 1999, AKV De Bermen and CKV De Kapellen merged into Korfbal Combinatie Capelle (KCC).

=== 21st century: Top tier indoors ===
In 2017, KCC promoted for the first time to the top tier indoor Korfbal League. It relegated back to second tier in 2019, though not for long as in 2020 it returned to the Korfbal League. KCC was early on referred to as a candidate for the championship in the second league.

In 2021 KCC finished dead-last, yet it was saved from relegation by the COVID-19 pandemic in the Netherlands. In the 2021–22 season, it was under the threat of losing an indoor facility, when their sports hall was needed for COVID-19 vaccinations. In 2022–23, KCC's player, Bo Oppe, who also played on the Dutch national team, became the top scorer for the season of the Korfbal League. It sufficed only for a 7th place out of 10 for KCC, and no relegation games that year for KCC.

After Oppe left to the Papendrechtse Korfbalclub, KCC played a weak 2023–2024 season. Finishing second to last, it played relegation games against promotion-hopeful KV TOP, which KCC won twice. A third game was not necessary and KCC hence remained in the Korfbal League for 2024–2025. The amount of players leaving the club could potentially impact KCC's success in the new season.
