= NGC 4458 =

Galaxy in the Virgo constellation

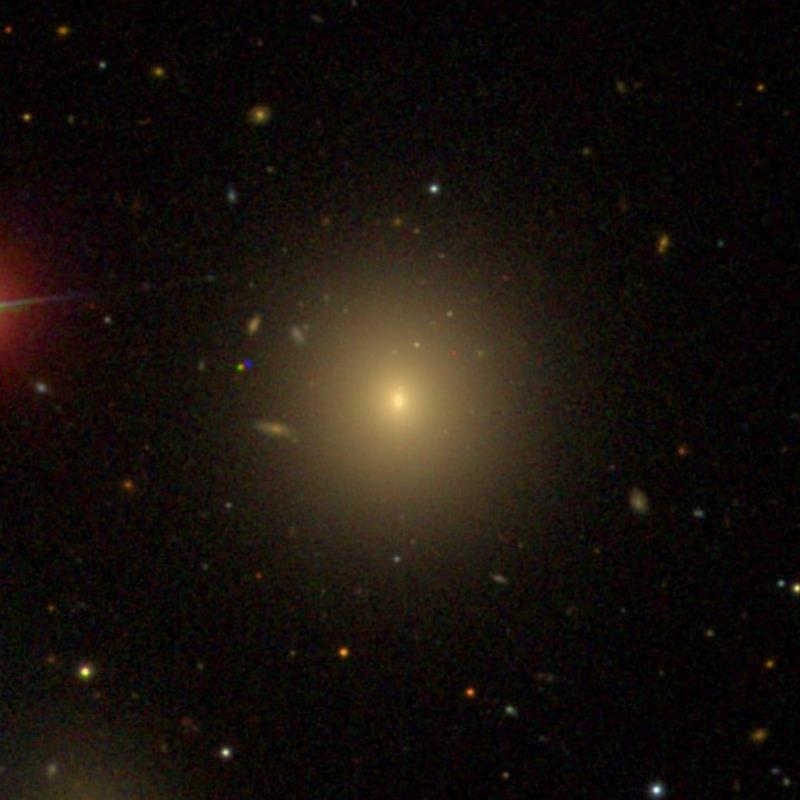
- The elliptical galaxy NGC 4458 as imaged by the SDSS.

Observation data (J2000 epoch)
- Constellation: Virgo
- Right ascension: 12^{h} 28^{m} 57.5^{s}
- Declination: 13° 14′ 31″
- Redshift: 0.002258/677 km/s
- Distance: 54,801,600 ly
- Group or cluster: Virgo Cluster
- Apparent magnitude (V): 12.93

Characteristics
- Type: E0
- Mass: ~1.07×10^{10} M_{☉}
- Size: ~ 29,000 ly (estimated)
- Apparent size (V): 1.7 x 1.6

Other designations
- CGCG 70-114, MCG 2-32-82, PGC 41095, UGC 7610, VCC 1146

NGC 4458 is an elliptical galaxy located about 54 million light-years away in the constellation of Virgo. It was discovered by astronomer William Herschel on April 12, 1784. NGC 4458 is a member of Markarian's Chain which is part of the Virgo Cluster. It is in a pair with the galaxy NGC 4461. NGC 4458 and NGC 4461 are interacting with each other.

NGC 4458 may have a supermassive black hole with an estimated mass of 200 million Suns (2×10^{8} M☉).

== Nuclear disk ==
NGC 4458 has an edge-on nuclear disk which is estimated to be about 6 billion years old. The disk likely formed from the merger of a gas-rich galaxy and has been found to have "similar properties to the decoupled cores of bright ellipticals".

== Counter-rotating core ==
Using Hubble images, it has been determined that NGC 4458 has a counter-rotating core.

== Metallicity ==
NGC 4458 has a low metal content but has an overabundance of the element iron.

== See also ==
- List of NGC objects (4001–5000)
- Messier 86
