= Kiangsu-Chekiang College (Kwai Chung) =

Secondary school in Hong Kong

Coordinates: 22.36145°N 114.12726°E

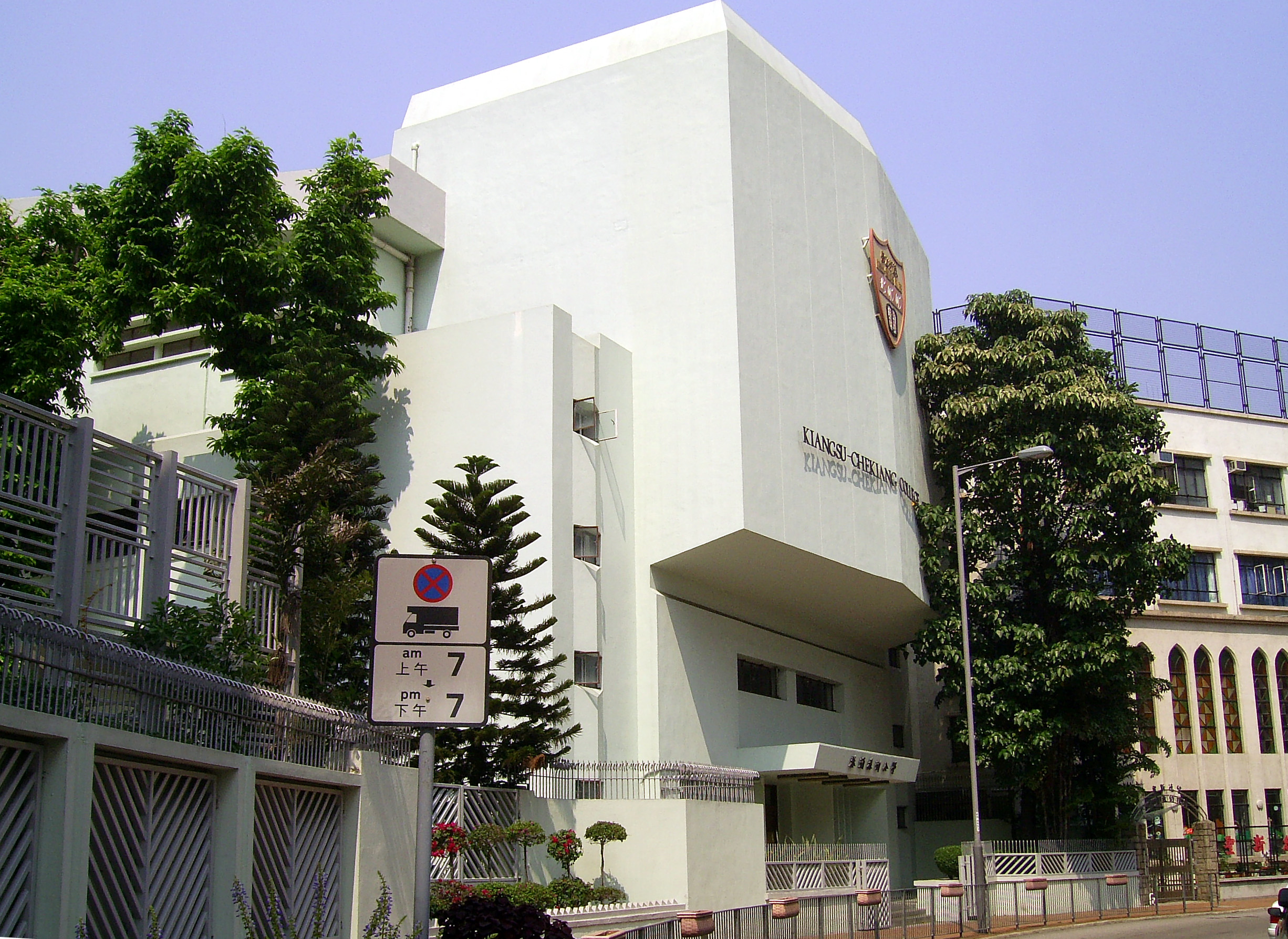
HK Kiangsu-Chekiang College Kwai Chung

Kiangsu-Chekiang College (Kwai Chung) (KCCKC; 葵涌蘇浙公學) is a secondary school in Kwai Chung, Hong Kong.
