= Samsung C&T =

South Korean construction conglomerate

Samsung C&T Corporation
- Native name: 삼성물산 주식회사
- Formerly: Samsung Corporation
- Type: Public
- Traded as: KRX: 028260
- Industry: Construction; Trading; Clothing; Hospitality
- Founded: 1938; 88 years ago
- Founder: Lee Byung-chul
- Headquarters: Seoul, South Korea
- Number of employees: (17,000+)
- Parent: Samsung
- Subsidiaries: Samsung Welstory; SAMOO Architects & Engineers
- Website: samsungcnt.com

Samsung Construction and Trading Corporation (Korean: 삼성물산 주식회사; stylized as Samsung C&T) is a South Korean construction and engineering company. It was founded in 1938 as the first Samsung company and was initially involved in construction and overseas trading operations. Since 1995, it has largely focused on global engineering and construction projects, trade and investments, fashion and real estate. The corporation is governed by an 11-member Board of Directors, made up of the President and CEOs of its four working groups (Engineering & Construction, Trading & Investment, Fashion, and Resort), the corporation's CFO, and six independent members. Samsung C&T employs over 17,000 people. The firm is often regarded as the holding company of Samsung chaebol as it is a major shareholder of various Samsung affiliates.

== History ==
In 1975, Samsung C&T was designated by the Korean government as the first general trading company to lead overseas sales operations. After the company merged with Samsung Construction in December 1995, Samsung C&T began engaging in global business with offices in more than 50 countries.

In September 2015, Samsung C&T merged with Cheil Industries, a Korean textile firm prominent in the fashion industry that was originally acquired by Samsung Everland in December 2013. The resulting Samsung C&T focuses on fashion, food, housing, leisure, and bio businesses with its Engineering & Construction, Trading & Investment, Fashion and Resort & Construction Groups. The merger has established a third pillar for the Samsung Group, adding to its electronics and financial services.

== Businesses ==
=== Engineering & Construction Group ===
Samsung C&T Engineering & Construction Group specializes in engineering, procurement, and construction.

==== Building projects ====
Engineering & Construction Group of Samsung C&T is best known for its role in skyscraper projects, including the 828-meter Burj Khalifa in Dubai, the Petronas Towers and Merdeka 118 in Kuala Lumpur, Malaysia, Taipei 101 in Taipei, Taiwan and the Saudi Stock Exchange Tadawul Tower in Riyadh, Saudi Arabia. The group is also known for building the Cleveland Clinic in Abu Dhabi, Taoyuan International Airport Terminal 3 in Taoyuan, Taiwan (under construction) as well as Incheon International Airport, Giheung Semiconductor Complex, and Raemian Apartment Complexes. The construction of the third terminal of Shahjalal International Airport in Dhaka will be done by Aviation Dhaka Consortium (ADC) consisting of Japanese companies like Mitsubishi Corporation, Fujita Corporation and the Samsung C&T.

==== Civil projects ====
Civil projects by Samsung C&T's Civil Infrastructure Business Unit include construction of roads, bridges, tunnels, ports, subways, and dams. Some of its most notable projects include the Mersey Gateway in the United Kingdom, the Riyadh Metro in Saudi Arabia, and the Busan Newport in South Korea.

==== Power plants ====
Samsung C&T's Plant Business Unit has been involved in the construction of modern power plants—both conventional and nuclear. Its past projects include the UAE Nuclear Power Complex and Emal Power Plant, as well as the LNG Terminal in Singapore.

=== Trading & Investment Group ===
Samsung C&T's Trading & Investment Group focuses on trading industrial commodities such as chemicals, steel, and natural resources, and organizes projects such as Samsung Renewable Energy (a wind/solar power cluster), the Balkhash Thermal Power Plant,

=== Fashion Group ===
In the early years, Fashion Group, formerly Cheil Industries, mainly focused on suit and casual wear with its clothing brands Galaxy and Beanpole. Besides, there was a sportswear brand, Rapido. Fashion Group diversified Beanpole into different lines of children's clothing, outdoor clothing, and accessories. It has also launched new brands in womenswear (KUHO/LeBeige) and in fast fashion (8 Seconds). The Group has been accelerating its entry into the global market, starting with the promotion of the brand Juun.J, which has presented menswear collections at Paris Fashion Week since 2007.

Fashion Group also participates in the development of Korean fashion industry through R&D investment, sponsorship, and fund-raising events. It operates Samsung Fashion Institute and Samsung Design Net, which is a channel to the latest industry news, trend insights, market reports, and research database. In order to support aspiring designers, Fashion Group runs Samsung Fashion Design Fund (SFDF) which selects designers annually.

==== Brands ====
- BEANPOLE
- GALAXY
- GALAXY LIFESTYLE
- ROGATIS
- JUUN.J
- SHIFT.G
- KUHO
- LEBEIGE
- kuho plus
- The Aperture
- anggae
- 8 seconds

=== Resort Group ===
Founded in 1963, the Resort & Construction Group has expanded its business scope from land development to resort, golf, food and beverage, energy and landscaping, and construction.

The Group's Everland Resort and high-end golf courses, such as Anyang Country Club and Gapyeong Benest, have been awarded the Innovative Operation for Customer Satisfaction and also received the top enterprise award in the theme park sector by the Korea Standard Association. After fifty years, the Resort Group's value chain extends from construction and energy to landscaping projects. Samsung Welstory, which has grown to become the largest catering service company in Korea since the service began in 1982, has operated as a separate entity since 2013.

== Corporate governance ==
As of December 2023

Shareholder	Stake (%)	Flag
Lee Jae-yong	18.10%	South Korea
KCC	9.17%	South Korea
National Pension Service	7.01%	South Korea
Lee Boo-jin	6.23%	South Korea
Lee Seo-hyun	6.23%	South Korea
Samsung Life Public Welfare Foundation	1.07%	South Korea
Hong Ra-hee	0.97%	South Korea
Samsung Foundation of Culture	0.61%	South Korea
Lee Yoo-jung	0.32%	South Korea
Samsung Welfare Foundation	0.04%	South Korea

Samsung C&T, Headquarters, See KCC.
