= Kiangsu-Chekiang College (Shatin) =

Secondary school in Hong Kong, China

Coordinates: 22°23′19.4″N 114°11′38.8″E

- 沙田蘇浙公學
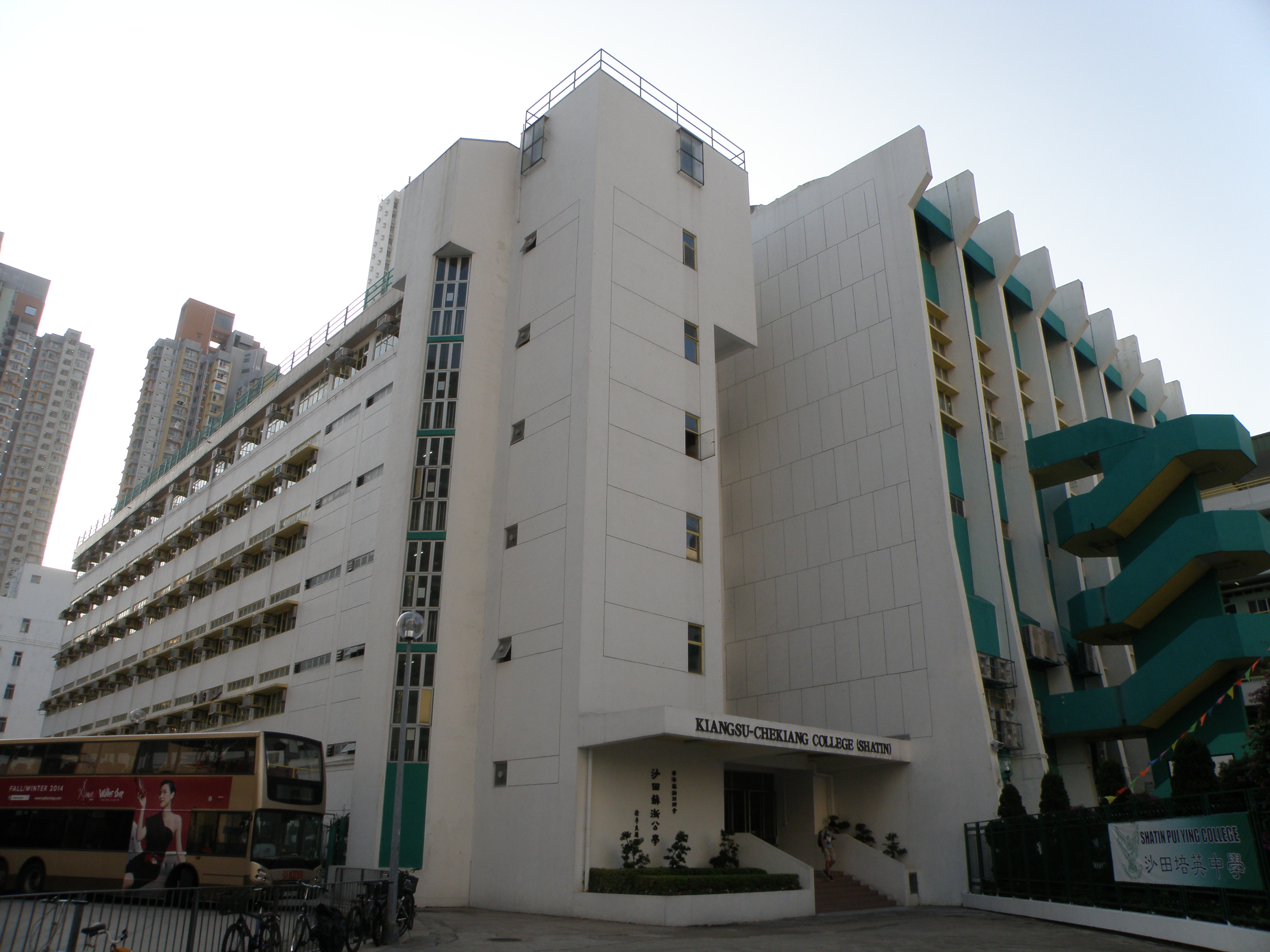
- School campus at Wo Che Estate

Information
- Type: Secondary
- Motto: Be Orderly and Respectful
- Established: 1978
- Gender: Co-educational

Kiangsu-Chekiang College (Shatin) (Chinese: 沙田蘇浙公學), abbreviated as KCCS or KCCST, is one of the secondary schools in Sha Tin District, Hong Kong. The school campus is next to Shatin Pui Ying College.

== History ==
The school is one of the four schools established by the Kiangsu & Chekiang Residents (HK) Association. When the school first opened in 1978, the permanent premises were not ready owing to a delay in the construction work. Classes had to be conducted on the school premises of the TWGHs Fung Wong Fung Ting Secondary School. In August 1979, the school moved into the present premises.

In 1982, the school was converted from a private capitation secondary school into a government aided secondary school.

== Information technology in education ==
The School Administration and Management System (SAMS) has been adopted and efforts have been made to strengthen the related facilities, for example, installing nodes in the school campus and using broadband network in order to gain faster access to the Internet.

Both teachers and students can have access to the Internet via the developed intranet system in the school. In addition, educational CD-ROMs have been purchased for teaching purposes.

In 2001, all of the staff completed the school-based information technology elementary, intermediate or advanced training courses and reached the IT standard set by the government. Meanwhile, information technology is widely applied to the teaching and learning of different subjects.

== School facilities and resources ==
There are twenty-six standard classrooms, three lifts, an assembly hall, a library, two playgrounds, four laboratories and a number of special rooms like six computer rooms, a student activity center, a dancing room, interview rooms and a broadcasting studio. There are also facilities for the physically disabled.
