= NGC 4477 =

Galaxy in the constellation Coma Berenices

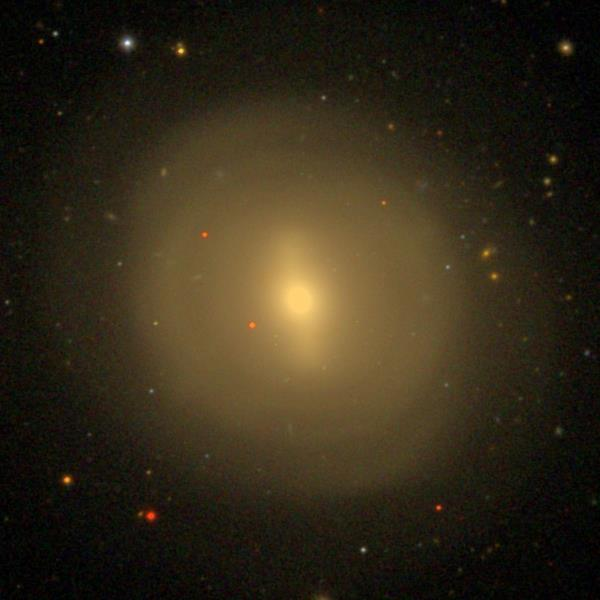
- SDSS image of NGC 4477

Observation data (J2000 epoch)
- Constellation: Coma Berenices
- Right ascension: 12^{h} 30^{m} 02.2^{s}
- Declination: 13° 38′ 12″
- Redshift: 0.004463
- Heliocentric radial velocity: 1,338 km/s
- Distance: 54.8 Mly (16.8 Mpc)
- Group or cluster: Virgo Cluster
- Apparent magnitude (V): 10.4

Characteristics
- Type: SB0(s)
- Size: ~69,340 ly (estimated)
- Apparent size (V): 3.7′ × 3.3′

Other designations
- VCC 1253, IRAS 12275+1354, UGC 7638, MCG 2-32-97, PGC 41260, CGCG 70-129

NGC 4477 is a barred lenticular galaxy in the constellation of Coma Berenices. It is classified as a type 2 Seyfert galaxy. This galaxy was discovered by German-British astronomer William Herschel on April 8, 1784. NGC 4477 is located about 55 million light-years away, where it is a member of Markarian's Chain in the Virgo Cluster of galaxies.

== Physical characteristics ==
NGC 4477 has a very well-defined bar which is imbedded within an extensive lens-like envelope. It has a fairly sharp edge and is slightly enhanced near the rim, and is classified as a ring-like feature. Surrounding the ring, two broad, diffuse incomplete arcs appear to bracket the galaxy around the bar. It is suggested that NGC 4477 has a highly evolved double ring morphology. Also, both ring features are exceedingly washed out.

== See also ==
- List of NGC objects (4001–5000)
- NGC 1291
- NGC 6782

== Gallery ==
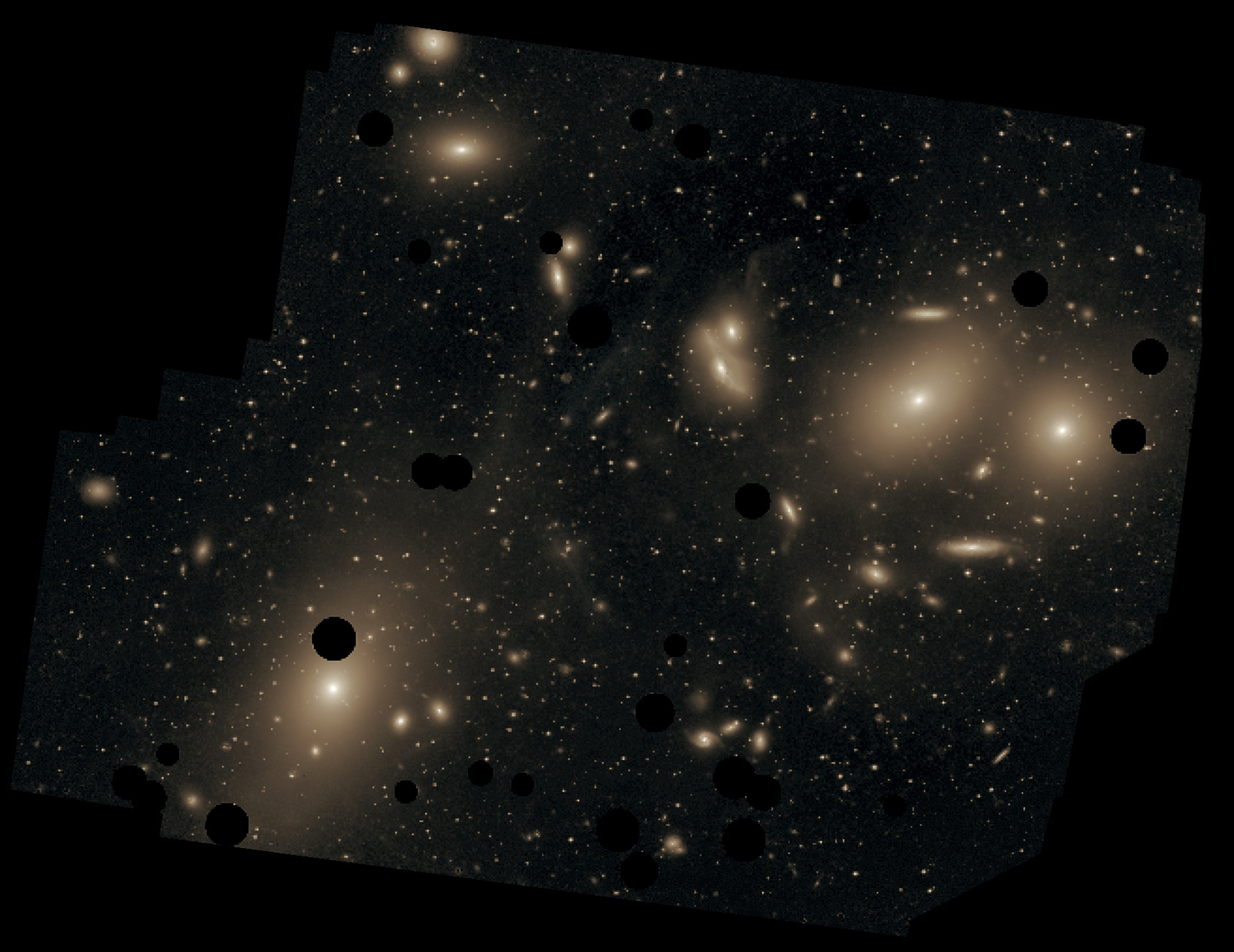
Image of the central region of the Virgo cluster of galaxies. NGC 4477 is at the edge of the upper-left central portion of the image.

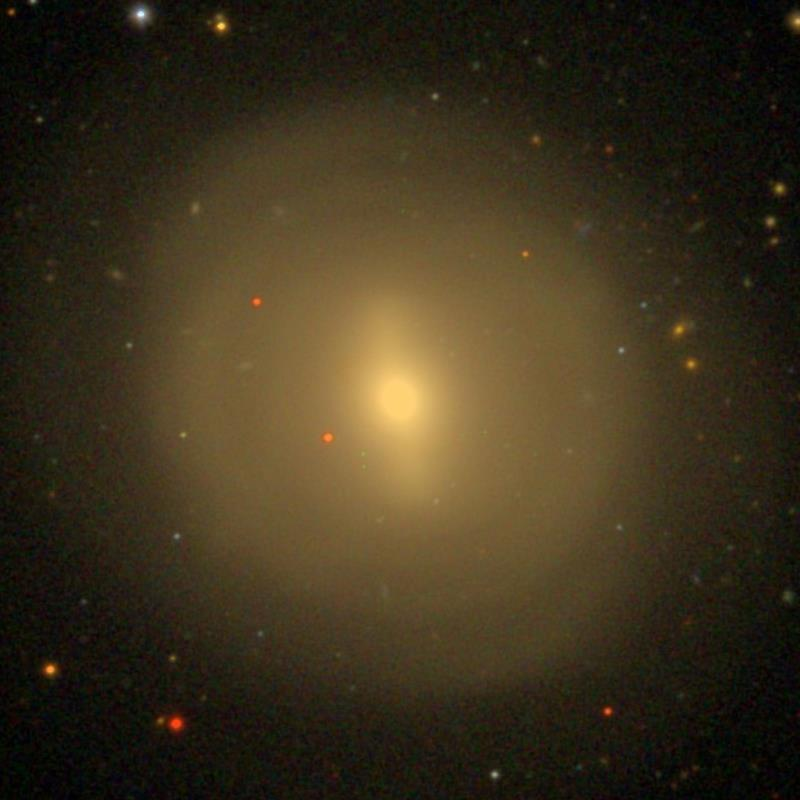
NGC 4477 (SDSS DR14)
