= Cheil Industries =

1954–2014 South Korean textile company

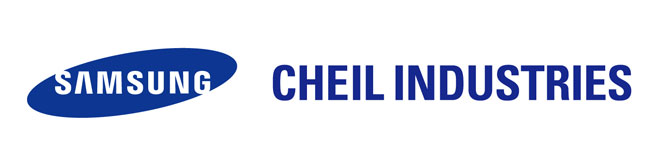
- Industry: Textile
- Founded: September 15, 1954; 71 years ago
- Founder: Lee Byung-chul
- Defunct: July 1, 2014
- Fate: Merger with Samsung C&T
- Parent: Samsung

- Cheil Industries
- Hangul: 제일모직
- Hanja: 第一毛織
- RR: Jeil mojik
- MR: Cheil mojik

Cheil Industries was an affiliate of the Samsung Group.

Since its establishment in 1954, Cheil Industries has been a Korean textile firm.

Thereafter, from the 1980s, the company expanded its business areas into fashion, chemicals and electronic chemical materials (ECM).

In October 2014, Cheil Industries submitted plans for an initial public offering, with around $1.41 billion in shares planned for listing on the South Korea Stock Exchange.

== History ==
- 1954 Cheil Woolen Fabrics Industries Established
- 1961 Exported 3,000 pounds of Jangmi brand carded wool to Hong Kong first
- 1965 Obtained a Korean license for Wool Mark from I.W.S.
- 1972 Established Cheil Synthetic Fiber
- 1976 Changed name to Cheil Industries
- 1992 Developed the world's first high-density 1,130,000 carpets
- 1994 Succeeded in developing and manufacturing EPS for foundry at the Hwasung R&D Center
- 2000 Changed the line of business registered with Korea Stock Exchange to chemicals
- 2003 Completed the construction of the Daegu Opera House
- 2007 Developed the 'Tempist Stylist' the world's first artificial marble with highly transparent chips
- 2013 Fashion business sold to Samsung Everland
- 2014 Merger with Samsung SDI Co., Ltd. (changed to 'Samsung SDI Chemicals and Electronic Materials')

After the merger:

- 2014 Samsung Everland changed its name to 'Cheil Industries Inc.'
- 2015: Cheil announced plans to acquire Samsung C&T for $7.7 billion, in an all-stock transaction viewed as consolidating Samsung heir Lee Jae-yong's control over the Samsung Group. Elliott Associates, an American hedge fund that owned 7.1% of Samsung C&T's stock, opposed the transaction and attempted to block it in court on the basis that it was not in the best interest of shareholders. The merger was approved by the shareholders in July and executed in September 2015. The combined company was named 'Samsung C&T'.

== Fashion ==
Cheil Industries began its business by producing textiles since 1954. The company then expanded its business areas into fashion by launching its first men's wear range in 1989. Since then, it has diversified into casual wear, ladies' wear and sportswear.

Cheil Industries was the first Korean fashion company to introduce the just-in-time (JIT) system as part of its restructuring efforts, considerably enhancing management efficiency through reduced lead time in the manufacturing process. It also made moves via consistent brand restructuring initiatives to enter into new business lines that it deems to have high growth potential. Through these initiatives, Cheil Industries was successful in building a profitable business structure, thereby establishing itself as a fashion company.

- MYPORT Footwear Portugal – International Footwear Outsourcing Agency based in Portugal.
- Bean Pole International
- 10 Corso Como
- 8seconds – a Specialty retailer of Private label Apparel (SPA) brand launched at the beginning of 2012.

In 2013 Cheil Industries sold the fashion business to Samsung Everland in a 1.05 trillion won ($968.6 million) deal. After the merger of Cheil Industries (the chemicals and materials business) with Samsung SDI in 2014 Samsung Everland renamed itself to Cheil Industries Inc. In 2015 Cheil Industries merged with Samsung C&T and the new company was named Samsung C&T.

== Other products ==
Now part of Samsung SDI Chemicals and Electronic Materials. Samsung SDI bought Cheil Industries for 3.5 trillion won ($3.3 billion) in stock in 2014. Cheil investors received about 0.44 of a share in the enlarged SDI for each share they owned.

=== Chemicals ===
Cheil Industries began its chemical business in 1989. The company entered into the polycarbonate [PC] business in 2007. A new PC plant was completed in March 2008 and is now operational. The company also produces flame-retardant ABS, sheet ABS, flame-retardant high-impact PS (HIPS), polycarbonate (PC), heat-recasting ABS for vehicles, and artificial marble.

=== Electronic materials ===
Cheil Industries' electronic material business started with the company's development in 1996 of EMC. The EMC business unit of Cheil Industries acquired KOSDAQ-listed Ace Digitech in March 2007 and began a polarizing film business, a core component of liquid crystal display [LCD] panels.

- Semiconductor Materials: Epoxy Molding Compound (EMC), Chemical-Mechanical Polishing (CMP) slurry
- Display Materials: Light Guide Plate, Diffusion Plate, Color Resist (CR), Anisotropic Conductive Film (ACF)
- Material for Secondary Batteries: Electrolytic solution
- Functional Materials: EMS, Paste

== See also ==
- Cheil Industries FC
- Fashion in South Korea
