= Foreign celebrity advertising =

Popular advertising phenomenon

Foreign celebrity advertising is a popular form of advertising in parts of Asia, Eastern Europe and Latin America. The phenomenon is most pronounced when English-speaking celebrities do print advertisements or commercials for a non-English speaking market.

== Rationale ==
Western actors have traditionally been reluctant to appear in widespread advertising campaigns, on the assumption that it cheapens their respectability and can be perceived as selling out by their fanbase or the critical public at large. In Asia, it is much more common to see dramatic actors in commercial advertisements. Japanese advertising budgets, for one, can be far more extravagant than American budgets when it comes to celebrity talent, so the deals in other countries can often prove much more lucrative than their domestic counterparts, with a much lower risk of negative publicity. As many of the celebrities participate under the assumption that their videos will never be seen by their domestic audience, many times they agree to do actions and read lines that are silly and outside of their normal image.

For the reasons stated above, celebrities often attempt to keep these advertisements a secret from American audiences. Arnold Schwarzenegger, who has done many television ads for Japanese drinks, food products, and television networks is known to secure a "secrecy clause", preventing Japanese advertisers from disclosing his sponsorship deals in the United States. Some celebrities, including Leonardo DiCaprio and Meg Ryan, have even gone so far as to file cease and desist letters against websites that mirrored the foreign advertisements.

In more recent years, possibly because of the faster spread of information made possible by the internet, American celebrities have been more open about doing foreign advertisements, as well as increasing their advertising presence in the United States. Oscar-winning actress Catherine Zeta-Jones has become the spokeswoman for T-Mobile, and a variety of reclusive celebrities such as Robert De Niro and M. Night Shyamalan have done individual advertisements for American Express.

== Examples ==
- Historically, American and European actors and filmmakers Orson Welles, Francis Ford Coppola, and Audrey Hepburn would appear in Japanese advertisements, while eschewing American ones. More recent celebrities such as Brad Pitt, Leonardo DiCaprio, Gwyneth Paltrow and Jodie Foster, who generally avoid publicity in the United States, have been known to do large-scale advertising campaigns in Japan and China.
- Several commercials featuring Arnold Schwarzenegger promoting the Japanese energy drink Alinamin V with zany actions is a favorite of Conan O'Brien, and was frequently featured on Late Night with Conan O'Brien as a filler clip.
- One Pepsi commercial that aired in Asia features American singer Christina Aguilera but wasn't aired in United States.

== Foreign celebrity advertising in popular culture ==
- The movie Lost in Translation follows an American actor's trip to Japan to film an ad for Suntory-brand whiskey. It is loosely based on Francis Ford Coppola, who did advertisements for the Japanese liquor, despite shying away from advertisements in the United States.
- The Entourage episode "Chinatown" features the main character, Vincent Chase, appearing in a lucrative Chinese energy drink commercial at the request of his agent. In the episode, the production quality and special effects budget of the commercial rivals some mainstream action movies.
- The Friends episode "The One with Ross's Grant" includes the character Joey appearing in a Japanese Lipstick for Men commercial.
