= Messier 86 =

Elliptical galaxy in the constellation Virgo

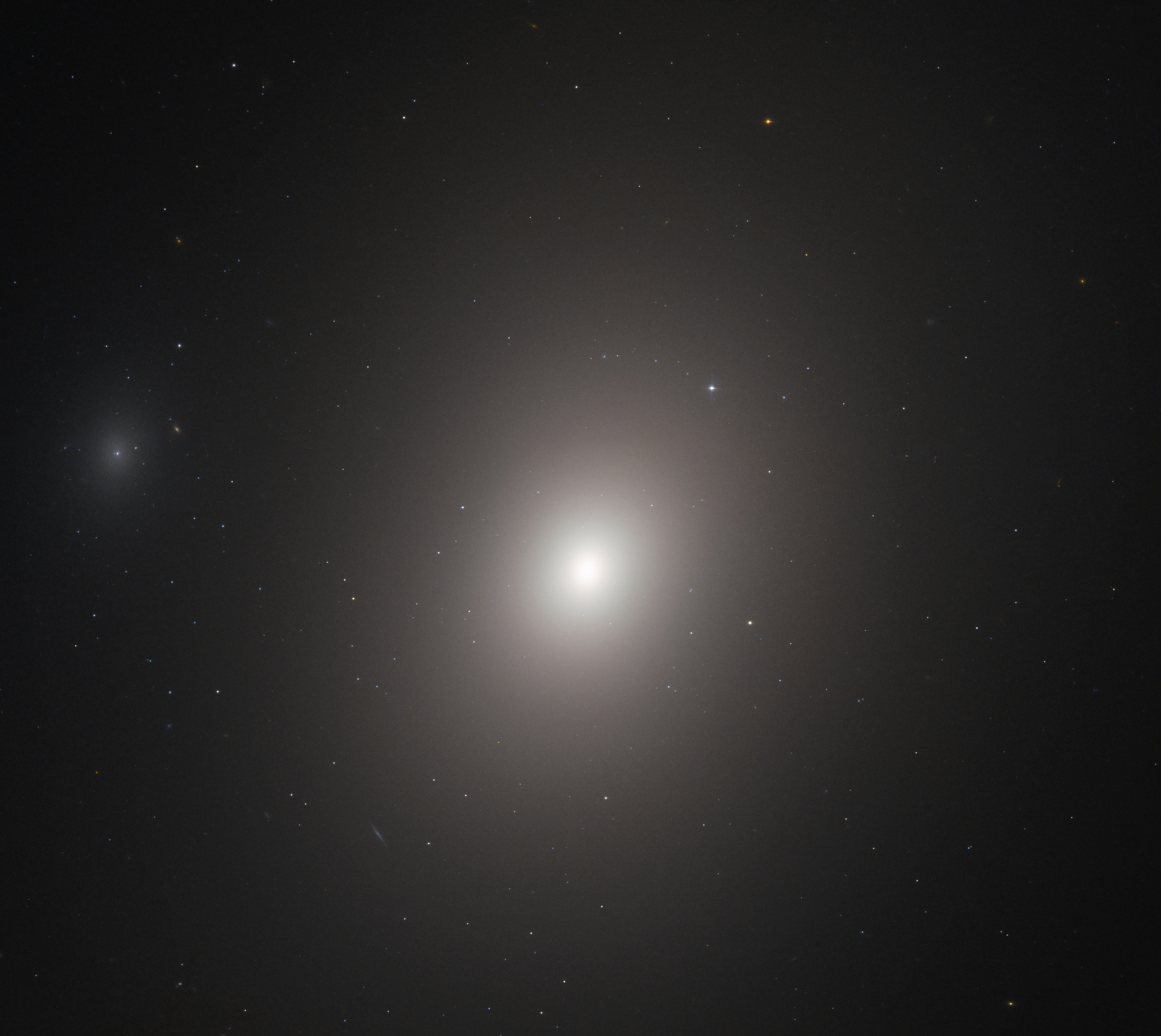
- Galaxy Messier 86 in Virgo, imaged by the Hubble Space Telescope

Observation data (J2000 epoch)
- Constellation: Virgo
- Right ascension: 12^{h} 26^{m} 11.7^{s}
- Declination: +12° 56′ 46″
- Redshift: −0.000814 ± 0.000017 (−244 ± 5 km/s)
- Distance: 52 ± 3 Mly (15.9 ± 1.0 Mpc)
- Apparent magnitude (V): 8.9

Characteristics
- Type: S0(3)/E3
- Apparent size (V): 8.9′ × 5.8′
- Notable features: displays a rare blue shift

Other designations
- NGC 4406, UGC 7532, PGC 40653, VCC 0881

Messier 86 (also known as M86 or NGC 4406) is a bright elliptical or lenticular galaxy in the constellation of Virgo. It was discovered by Charles Messier in 1781. M86 lies in the heart of the Virgo Cluster of galaxies and forms a most conspicuous group with another large galaxy known as Messier 84. It displays the highest blue shift of all Messier objects, as it is, net of its other vectors of travel, approaching the Milky Way at 244 km/s. This is due to both galaxies falling roughly towards the center of the Virgo cluster from opposing ends.

Messier 86 has a rich array of globular clusters, with a total number of around 3,800. Its halo also has a number of stellar streams interpreted as remnants of dwarf galaxies that have been disrupted and absorbed by this galaxy.

Messier 86 is linked by several filaments of ionized gas to the severely disrupted spiral galaxy NGC 4438, indicating that M86 may have stripped some gas and interstellar dust from the spiral. It is also suffering ram-pressure stripping as it moves at high speed through Virgo's intracluster medium, losing its interstellar medium and leaving behind a very long trail of X ray-emitting hot gas that has been detected with the help of the Chandra space telescope. The metal composition of magnesium, silicon and sulfur in the M86 galaxy is more similar to the rest of the universe than its own stellar population. This suggests that even ram pressure stripping is insufficient to strip the inner parts of the galaxy.

== See also ==
- List of Messier objects
