= NGC 4467 =

Galaxy in the constellation of Virgo

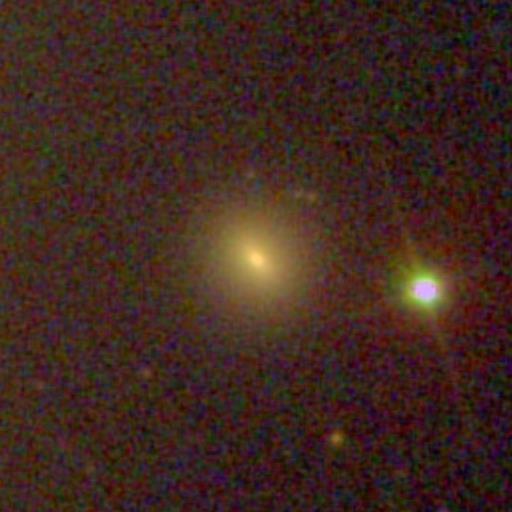
- SDSS image of NGC 4467.

Observation data (J2000 epoch)
- Constellation: Virgo
- Right ascension: 12^{h} 29^{m} 30.2^{s}
- Declination: 07° 59′ 34″
- Redshift: 0.004747/1423 km/s
- Distance: 78,570,000 ly
- Group or cluster: Virgo Cluster
- Apparent magnitude (V): 14.8

Characteristics
- Type: E2
- Size: ~ 21,680 ly
- Apparent size (V): 0.62 x 0.57

Other designations
- ARAK 369, CGCG 42-130, Ho 413c, MCG 1-32-80, PGC 41169, VCC 1192

NGC 4467 is an elliptical galaxy located about 78 million light-years away in the constellation of Virgo. NGC 4467 was discovered by astronomer Otto Struve on April 28, 1851. NGC 4467 is a companion of Messier 49 and is a member of the Virgo Cluster.

== See also ==
- List of NGC objects (4001–5000)
- NGC 4464
