= NGC 4551 =

Elliptical galaxy in the constellation Virgo

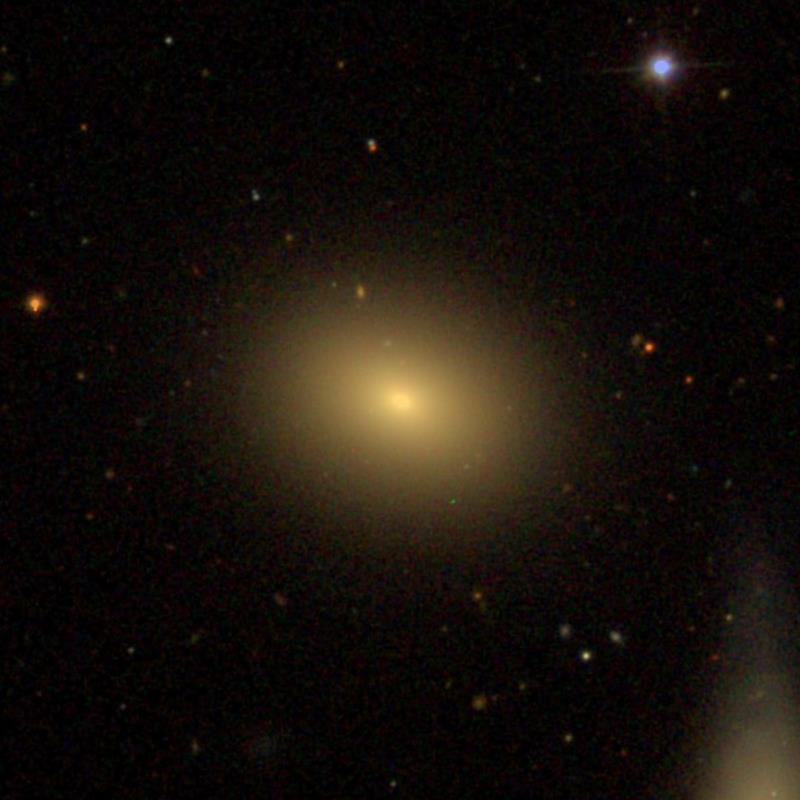
- SDSS image of NGC 4551

Observation data (J2000 epoch)
- Constellation: Virgo
- Right ascension: 12^{h} 35^{m} 37.9^{s}
- Declination: 12° 15′ 50″
- Redshift: 0.003923
- Heliocentric radial velocity: 1176 km/s
- Distance: 67 Mly
- Group or cluster: Virgo Cluster
- Apparent magnitude (V): 12.97

Characteristics
- Type: E2
- Size: ~29,340 ly (estimated)
- Apparent size (V): 1.8 x 1.4

Other designations
- CGCG 70-183, MCG 2-32-148, PGC 41963, UGC 7759, VCC 1630

NGC 4551 is an elliptical galaxy located about 70 million light-years away in the constellation Virgo. It was discovered by astronomer William Herschel on April 17, 1784. NGC 4551 appears to lie close to the lenticular galaxy NGC 4550. However, both galaxies show no sign of interaction and have different red shifts. Both galaxies are also members of the Virgo Cluster.

== See also ==
- List of NGC objects (4001–5000)
- Dwarf elliptical galaxy
