= NGC 4470 =

Galaxy in the constellation Virgo

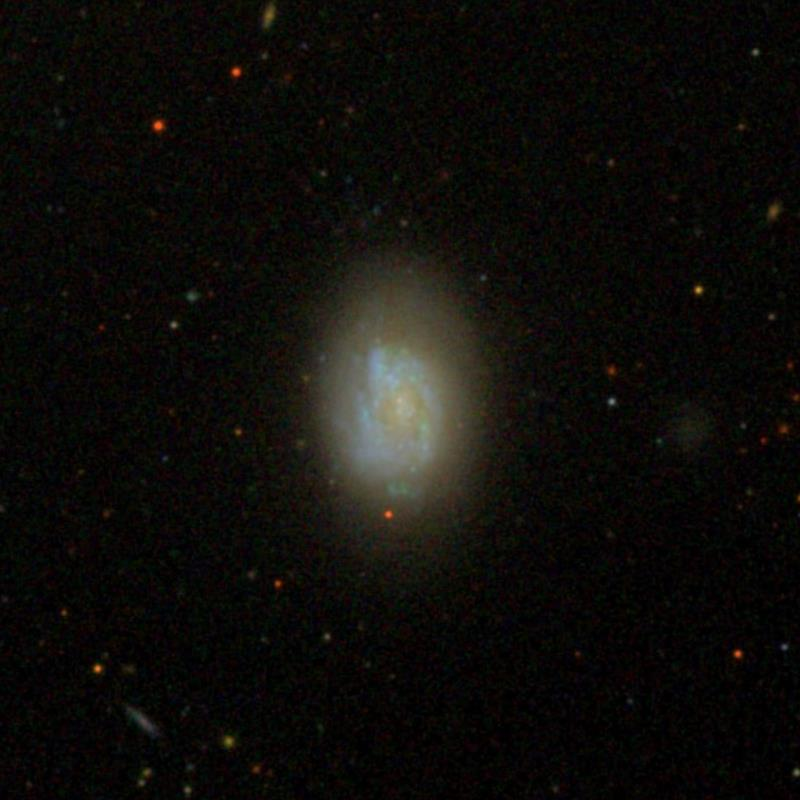
- NGC 4470 imaged by the Sloan Digital Sky Survey

Observation data (J2000 epoch)
- Constellation: Virgo
- Right ascension: 12^{h} 29^{m} 37.7893^{s}
- Declination: +07° 49′ 27.624″
- Redshift: 0.007805 ± 0.000002
- Heliocentric radial velocity: 2,340 ± 1 km/s
- Distance: 57.2 ± 16.2 Mly (17.5 ± 5.0 Mpc)
- Apparent magnitude (V): 12.2

Characteristics
- Type: Sa?
- Size: ~30,000 ly (9.1 kpc) (estimated)
- Apparent size (V): 1.61′ × 0.98′

Other designations
- IRAS 12270+0806, NGC 4610, UGC 7627, MCG +01-32-082, PGC 41189, CGCG 042-132

NGC 4470, also known as NGC 4610, is a spiral galaxy in the constellation Virgo. The galaxy lies about 55 million light years away from Earth based on redshift-independent methods, which means, given its apparent dimensions, that NGC 4470 is approximately 30,000 light years across. However based on redshift the galaxy lies about 120 million light years away. It was discovered by William Herschel on January 23, 1784, however the coordinates were wrong, as according to John Louis Emil Dreyer Herschel mistook Messier 49 for Messier 61. Herschel observed the galaxy again 28 December 1785 and catalogued it at the correct coordinates.

The Reference Catalog of galaxy Spectral Energy Distributions places the nucleus of NGC 4470 in the HII region of the narrow-line [O iiI]/Hβ versus [N ii]/Hα diagnostic diagram. The galaxy has been observed by Chandra X-ray Observatory and XMM Newton and was found to emit X-rays in a model consistent with a power law. As observed with other low-luminosity active galactic nuclei, the flux features little variability. The mass of the black hole in the centre of the galaxy is estimated to be between 10,000 and one million M_{☉} based on different methods, which would position it as an intermediate mass black hole (IMBH). There is another equally bright X-ray source 2.″1 (170 pc) to the south, and a more extended source (~10^{39} erg/s) located 6″ northeast of the nuclear position and associated with an excess of blue stars and ongoing star formation. The second nuclear source could be a stellar-mass ultraluminous X-ray source or one half of a dual IMBH system. In the center of the galaxy also lies a nuclear star cluster with a mass of 10^{6.42 ± 0.35} (1.1 – 6 millions) M_{☉}. The galaxy lacks a bulge but instead has a small bar.

Although no supernova has been observed in NGC 4470, one transient has been found in the galaxy, AT 2017jfs. It was discovered by Gaia on 26 December 2017 at an apparent magnitude of 17.17 ± 0.20. It was originally characterised as a type IIn supernova or a supernova impostor, however its light curve was typical of a luminous red nova. It was probably the result of the merger of a massive binary star.

NGC 4470 lies 10 arcminutes south of giant elliptical galaxy Messier 49, a member of the Virgo Cluster, and could be its companion. There are detached star formation regions north of NGC 4470, towards the direction of M49.
