= NGC 4519 =

Galaxy in the constellation of Virgo

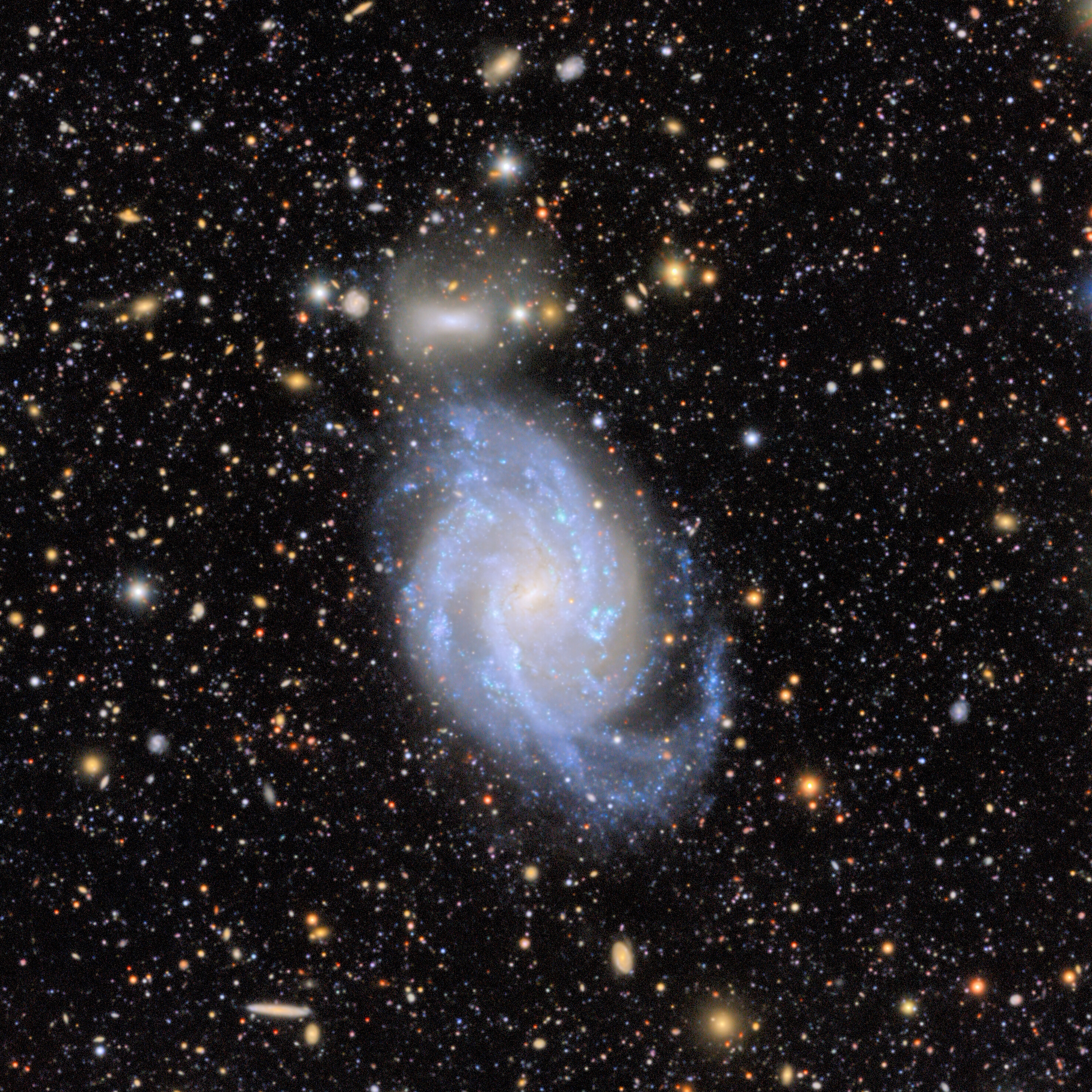
- NGC 4519 imaged by the Vera C. Rubin Observatory

Observation data (J2000 epoch)
- Constellation: Virgo
- Right ascension: 12^{h} 33^{m} 30.2419^{s}
- Declination: +08° 39′ 17.334″
- Redshift: 0.004063±0.000003
- Distance: 72.56 ± 6.03 Mly (22.248 ± 1.850 Mpc)
- Group or cluster: Virgo Cluster
- Apparent magnitude (V): 12.9

Characteristics
- Type: SB(rs)d
- Size: ~80,200 ly (24.59 kpc) (estimated)
- Apparent size (V): 2.69′ × 1.75′

Other designations
- VCC 1508, IRAS 12308+0856, UGC 7709, MCG +02-32-135, PGC 41719, CGCG 070-167

NGC 4519 is a barred spiral galaxy located about 72 million light-years away in the constellation Virgo. It was discovered by German-British astronomer William Herschel on April 15, 1784. It has a companion galaxy known as PGC 41706 and is a member of the Virgo Cluster.

== Physical characteristics ==
NGC 4519 has an asymmetric structure that contains a well-defined bar.

== Image gallery ==
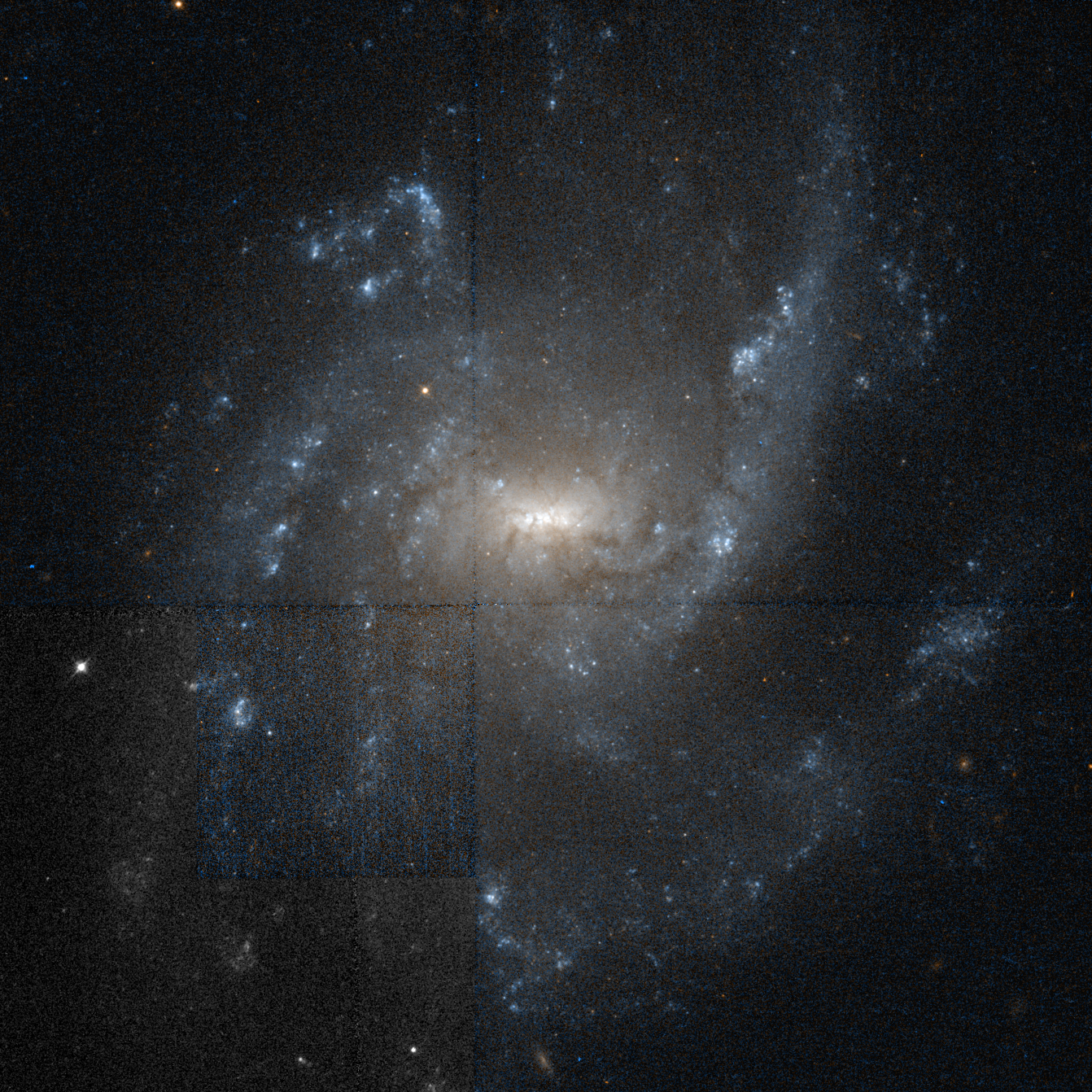
NGC 4519 imaged by the Hubble Space Telescope

== See also ==
- List of NGC objects (4001–5000)
- NGC 4498
