= NGC 4639 =

Barred spiral galaxy in the constellation Virgo

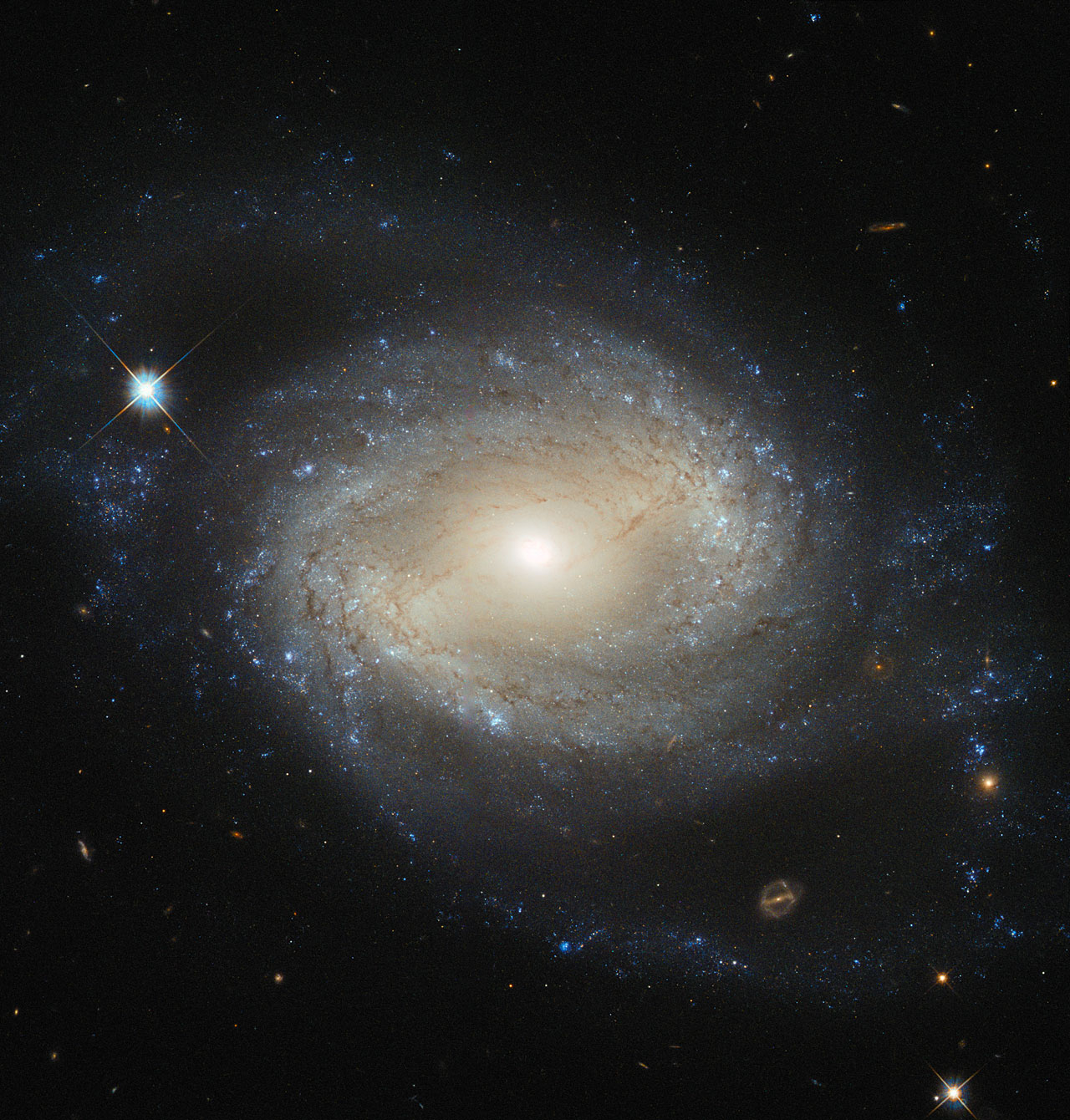
- NGC 4639 imaged by the Hubble Space Telescope

Observation data (J2000 epoch)
- Constellation: Virgo
- Right ascension: 12^{h} 42^{m} 52.37814^{s}
- Declination: +13° 15′ 26.7129″
- Heliocentric radial velocity: 989 km/s
- Distance: 72.02 ± 0.23 Mly (22.08 ± 0.07 Mpc)
- Group or cluster: Virgo Cluster
- Apparent magnitude (V): 12.2

Characteristics
- Type: SAB(rs)bc
- Apparent size (V): 2′.8 × 1′.9
- Notable features: Seyfert type 1

Other designations
- IRAS 12403+1331, LEDA 42741, MCG+02-32-189, NGC 4639, UGC 7884, VCC 1943, PGC 42741

NGC 4639 is a barred spiral galaxy located in the equatorial constellation of Virgo. It was discovered by German-born astronomer William Herschel on 12 April 1784. John L. E. Dreyer described it as "pretty bright, small, extended, mottled but not resolved, 12th magnitude star 1 arcmin to southeast". This is a relatively nearby galaxy, lying approximately 72 million light-years away from the Milky Way. It is a companion to NGC 4654, and the two appear to have interacted roughly 500 million years ago. NGC 4639 is a member of the Virgo Cluster.

The morphological classification of this galaxy is SAB(rs)bc, indicating a spiral galaxy with a weak bar (SAB), an incomplete ring around the bar (rs), and moderate to loosely-wound spiral arms (bc). NGC 4639 has a mildly active galactic nucleus of the Seyfert type 1; one of the weakest known. The compact central source has been detected by its X-ray emission, and is variable on timescales of months to years. There is a supermassive black hole at the core with an estimated mass of 7.9×10^{6} M_{☉}.

== Supernovae ==
Two supernovae have been observed in NGC 4639:

- SN 1990N (Type Ia, mag. 15.5) was discovered by E. Thouvenot on 22 June 1990, two weeks before reaching peak brightness. It was positioned 63.2″ east and 1.8″ south of the galaxy core. The brightness and proximity of this supernova event has allowed it to be used as a standard candle.
- SN 2018imf (Type IIP, mag. 15.8) was discovered by Kōichi Itagaki on 14 November 2018. (Note: While officially associated with NGC 4639, this supernova is actually much closer to the neighboring galaxy LEDA 42710.)
