= NGC 4417 =

Galaxy in the constellation Virgo

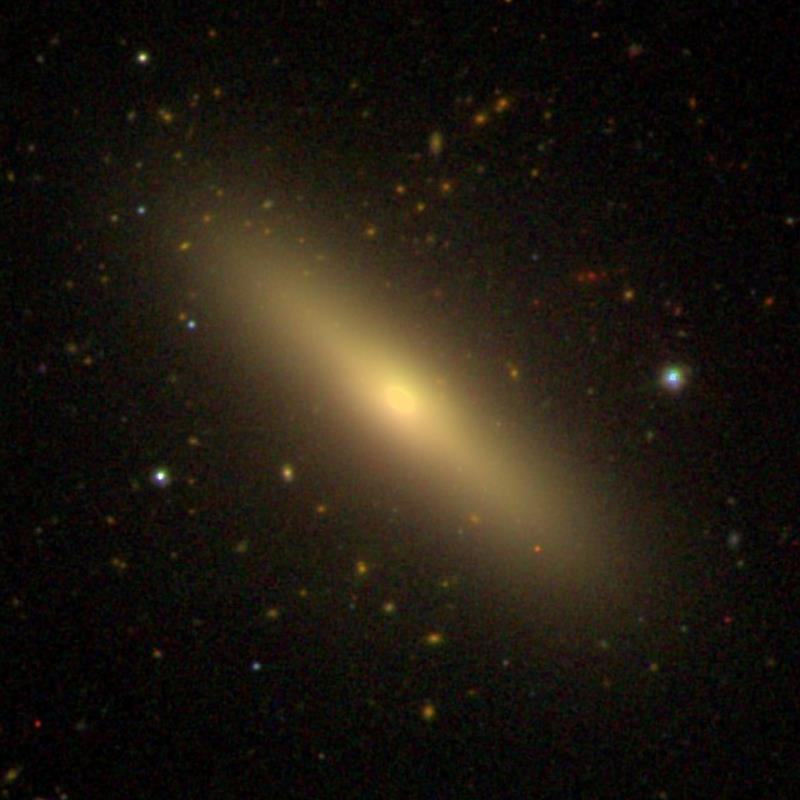

NGC 4417 is a lenticular galaxy located in the constellation Virgo. It was discovered by William Herschel on April 15, 1784. It is a member of the Virgo Cluster.

NGC 4417 is located near the celestial equator, making it observable from both the Northern and Southern Hemispheres at certain times of the year. With an apparent B-band magnitude of 12.2, it can be viewed using a telescope with an aperture of at least 200 millimeters (8 inches).
