= NGC 4306 =

Dwarf barred lenticular galaxy in the constellation Virgo

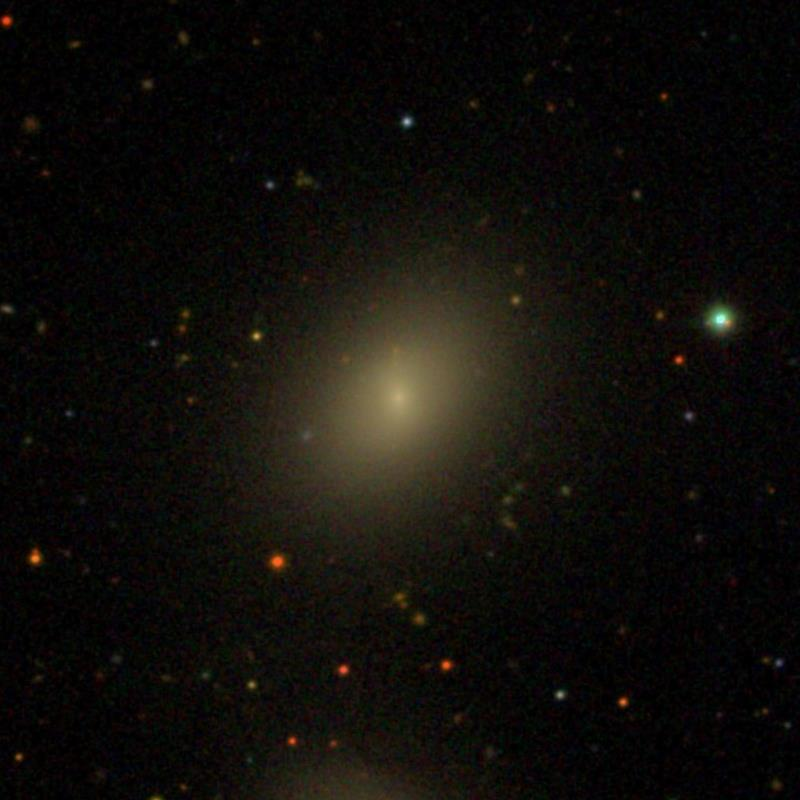
- Sloan Digital Sky Survey image of NGC 4306.

Observation data (J2000 epoch)
- Constellation: Virgo
- Right ascension: 12^{h} 22^{m} 04.1^{s}
- Declination: 12° 47′ 15″
- Redshift: 0.006608
- Heliocentric radial velocity: 1981 km/s
- Distance: 103 Mly (31.6 Mpc)
- Apparent magnitude (V): 13.8

Characteristics
- Type: SB0^0(s)
- Size: ~23,000 ly (7 kpc) (estimated)
- Apparent size (V): 1.50 x 1.02

Other designations
- UGC 07433, VCC 0523, PGC 040032, MCG +02-32-014

NGC 4306 is a dwarf barred lenticular galaxy located about 100 million light-years away in the constellation Virgo. The galaxy was discovered by astronomer Heinrich d'Arrest on April 16, 1865. Although considered to be a member of the Virgo Cluster, its high radial velocity and similar distance as NGC 4305 suggest that NGC 4306 is a background galaxy. NGC 4306 is a companion of NGC 4305 and appears to be interacting with it.

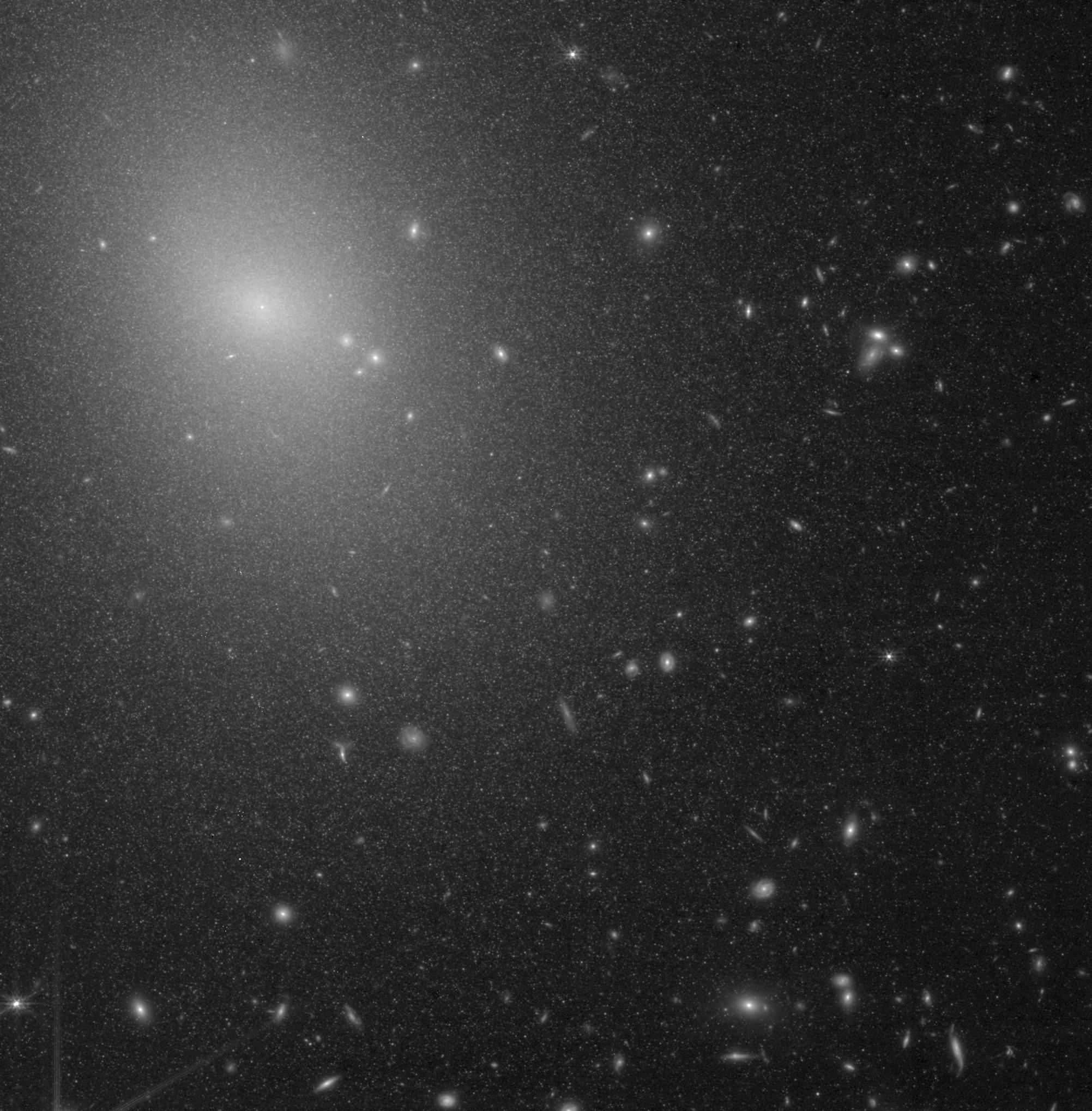
NGC 4306 with the James Webb Space Telescope NIRCam
