= NGC 4222 =

Edge-on spiral galaxy in the constellation Coma Berenices

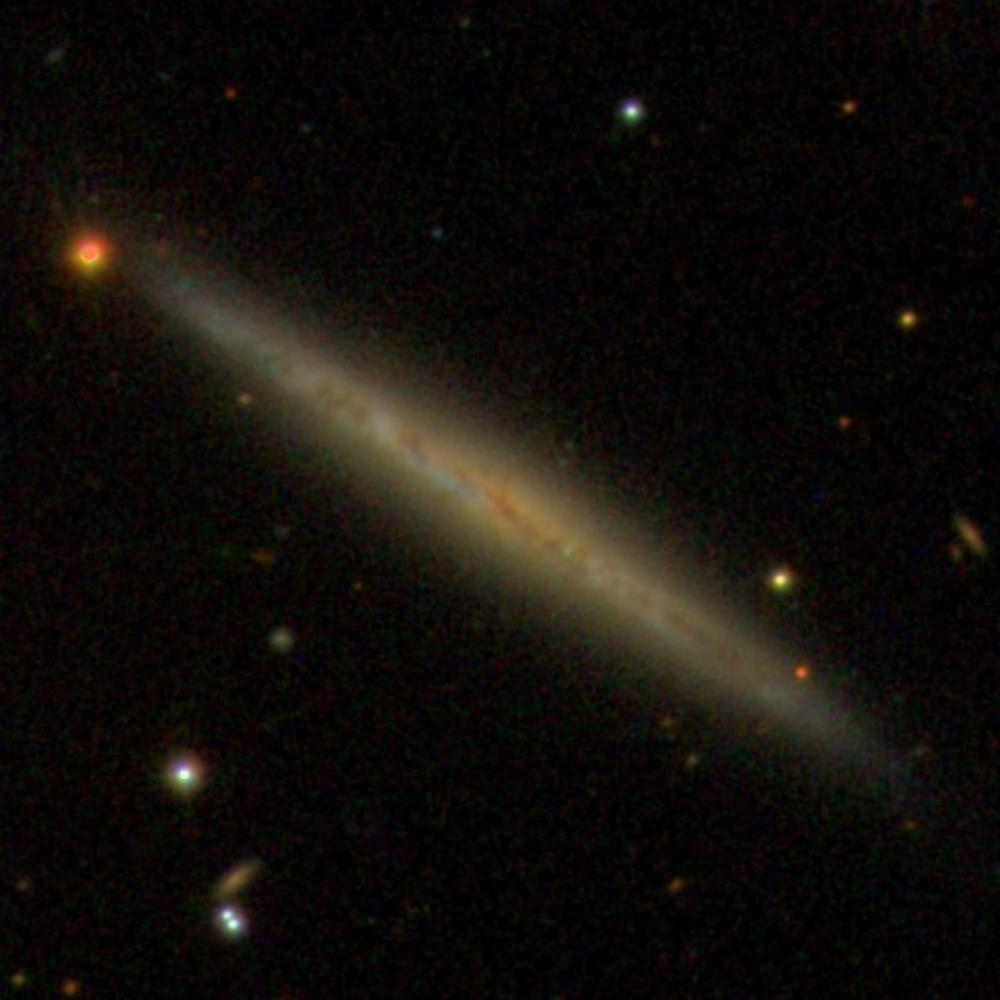
- SDSS image of NGC 4222.

Observation data (J2000 epoch)
- Constellation: Coma Berenices
- Right ascension: 12^{h} 16^{m} 22.5^{s}
- Declination: 13° 18′ 25″
- Redshift: 0.000767
- Heliocentric radial velocity: 230 km/s
- Distance: 62 Mly (19 Mpc)
- Group or cluster: Virgo Cluster
- Apparent magnitude (V): 13.86

Characteristics
- Type: Sd
- Size: ~72,000 ly (22 kpc) (estimated)
- Apparent size (V): 3.25 x 0.45

Other designations
- CGCG 69-119, FGC 1396, IRAS 12138+1334, MCG 2-31-75, PGC 39308, UGC 7291, VCC 187

NGC 4222 is an edge-on spiral galaxy located about 60 million light-years away in the constellation Coma Berenices. It was discovered by astronomer William Herschel on April 8, 1784, and is often misidentified as IC 3087. NGC 4222 is a member of the Virgo Cluster and is a companion of NGC 4216 which lies about 180,000 ly (56 kpc) away. Despite this, the two galaxies are not interacting.

== See also ==
- List of NGC objects (4001–5000)
