= NGC 4305 =

Dwarf spiral galaxy in the constellation Virgo

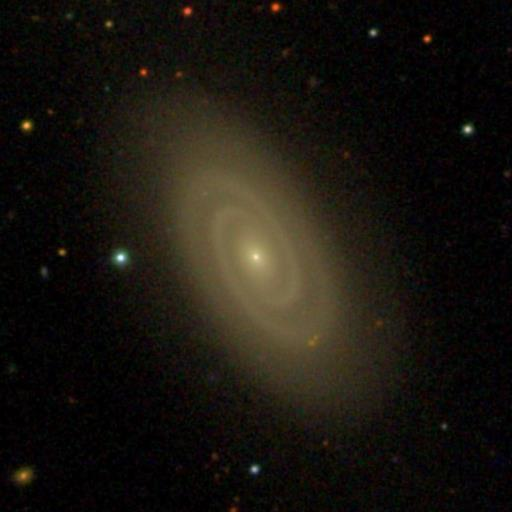
- SDSS image of NGC 4305.

Observation data (J2000 epoch)
- Constellation: Virgo
- Right ascension: 12^{h} 22^{m} 03.6^{s}
- Declination: 12° 44′ 27″
- Redshift: 0.006298
- Heliocentric radial velocity: 1888 km/s
- Distance: 98 Mly (30 Mpc)
- Apparent magnitude (V): 13.4

Characteristics
- Type: SA(r)a
- Size: ~32,000 ly (9.7 kpc) (estimated)
- Apparent size (V): 2.07 x 0.97

Other designations
- UGC 07432, VCC 0522, PGC 040030, MCG +02-32-013

NGC 4305 is a dwarf spiral galaxy located about 100 million light-years away in the constellation Virgo. The galaxy was discovered by astronomer John Herschel on May 2, 1829. Although considered to be a member of the Virgo Cluster, its high radial velocity and blue luminosity suggest it is in fact a background galaxy. The galaxy has a nearby major companion; NGC 4306.

NGC 4305 exhibits well-defined, smooth spiral arms which terminate well outside its central bulge. This spiral structure appears to have been induced by a tidal interaction with NGC 4306. Such a tidal interaction would also explain its deficiency in neutral hydrogen gas (HI).
