= NGC 4466 =

Spiral galaxy in the constellation of Virgo

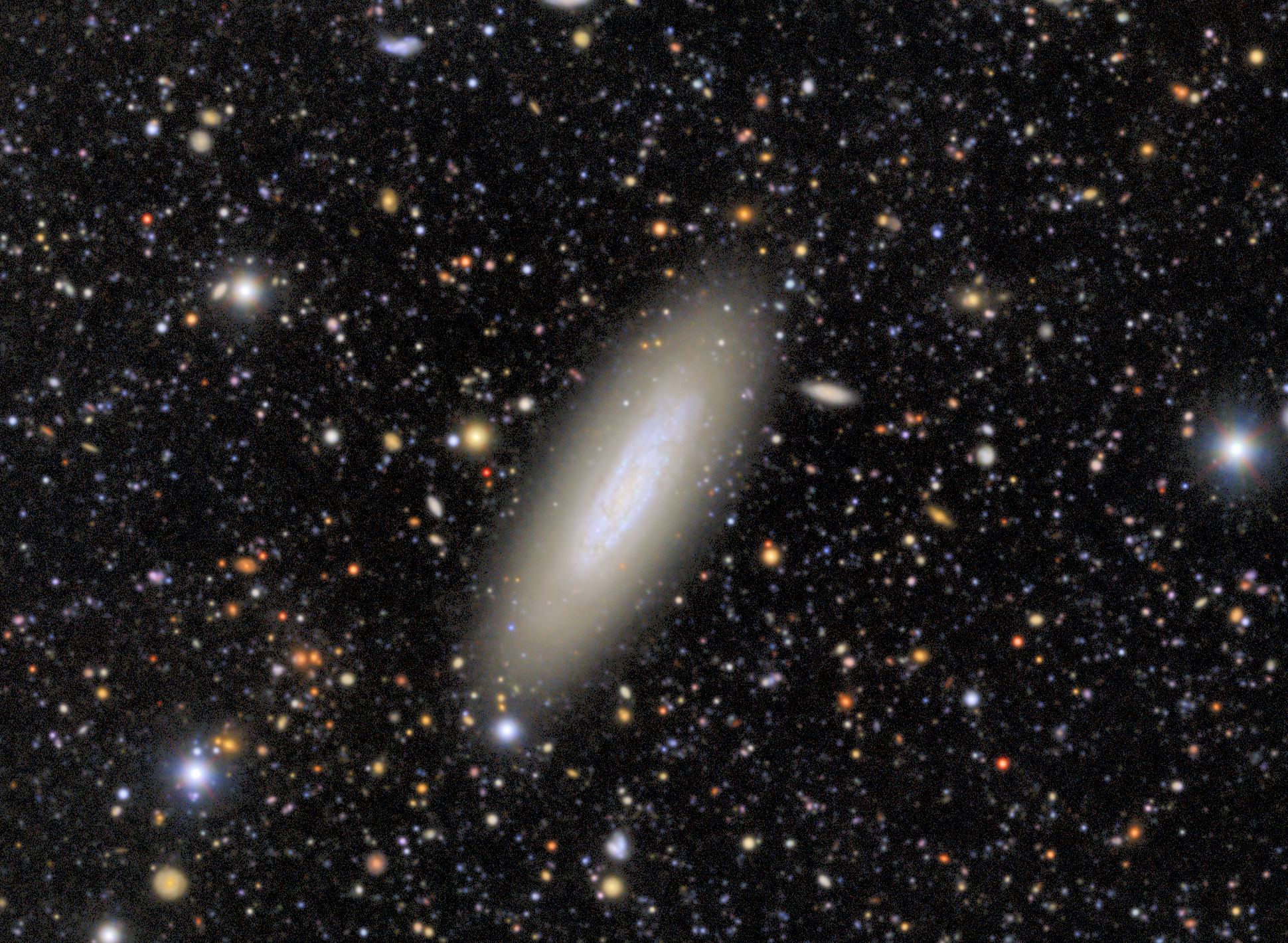
- NGC 4466 imaged by the Vera C. Rubin Observatory

Observation data (J2000 epoch)
- Constellation: Virgo
- Right ascension: 12^{h} 29^{m} 30.6^{s}
- Declination: 07° 41′ 47″
- Redshift: 0.002512/753 km/s
- Distance: 48,570,000 ly
- Group or cluster: Virgo Cluster
- Apparent magnitude (V): 14.2

Characteristics
- Type: Sab
- Size: ~40,685 ly (estimated)
- Apparent size (V): 1.54 x 0.51

Other designations
- CGCG 42-131, Ho 412a, MCG 1-32-81, PGC 41170, UGC 7626, VCC 1193

NGC 4466 is an edge-on spiral galaxy located about 50 million light-years away in the constellation of Virgo. NGC 4466 was discovered by astronomer Bindon Stoney on February 26, 1851. The galaxy is a member of the Virgo Cluster.

== See also ==
- List of NGC objects (4001–5000)
