= NGC 4425 =

Galaxy in the constellation Virgo

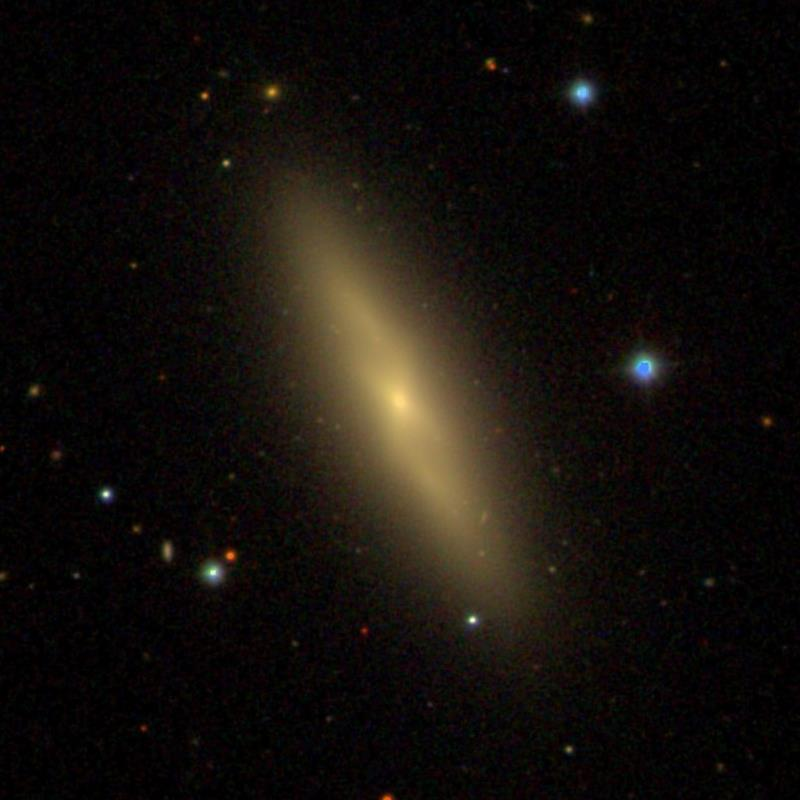
- Picture of the galaxy NGC 4425

Observation data (J2000 epoch)
- Constellation: Virgo
- Right ascension: 12^{h} 27^{m} 13.3369s^{s}
- Declination: +12° 44′ 05.059″″
- Redshift: 0.006310
- Heliocentric radial velocity: 1892 ± 2 km/s
- Distance: 81.5 ± 6.1 Mly (25.0 ± 1.9 Mpc)
- Group or cluster: Virgo Cluster
- Apparent magnitude (V): 11.8
- Absolute magnitude (B): -18.83

Characteristics
- Type: SB0+:sp
- Apparent size (V): 3.1′ × 1.0′

Other designations
- UGC 07562, VCC 0984, VPC 0518, CGCG 070-091

NGC 4425 is a barred, early-type lenticular galaxy, with a spindle/edge-on appearance, located in the constellation Virgo. It was discovered on April 17, 1784 by the astronomer William Herschel. It is a part of the Virgo Cluster of galaxies.

== Properties ==
=== Structural Properties ===
It has a bulge radius $R_b$ of 2.9'' or 0.4 kpc, effective radius $R_e$ of 22.8'' or 3 kpc and major isophotal diameter $R_{25}$ of 88.5 '' or 11.6 kpc at $\mu_B = 25 \text{ mag/arcsec}^2$.

It has a major axis position angle of 27° and an ellipticity of 0.64.

=== Star Formation Activity ===
It shows weak to negligible star formation in both its central nuclear region and its outer disc/spiral arms.

== See also ==
- List of NGC objects
- List of NGC objects (4001–5000)
