= NGC 4178 =

Galaxy in the constellation Virgo

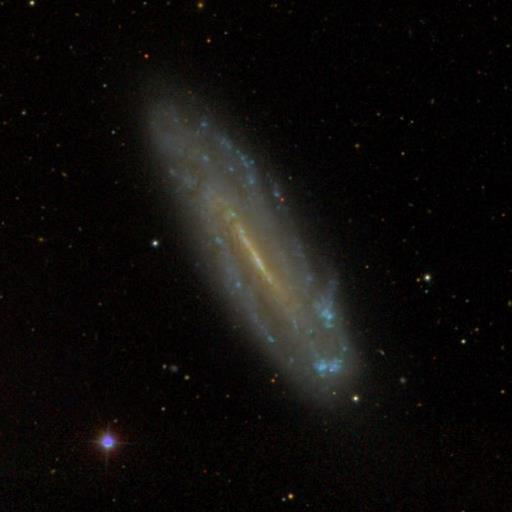
- NGC 4178 imaged by SDSS

Observation data (J2000 epoch)
- Constellation: Virgo
- Right ascension: 12^{h} 12^{m} 46.443^{s}
- Declination: +10° 51′ 57.59″
- Redshift: 0.001261 ± 0.000013
- Heliocentric radial velocity: +377 km/s
- Distance: 43.8 Mly (13.43 Mpc)
- Group or cluster: Virgo Cluster

Characteristics
- Type: SB(rs)dm
- Size: 74,980 ly (estimated)
- Apparent size (V): 2.300′ × 0.414′

Other designations
- 2MASX J12124644+1051575, LEDA 38943, UGC 7215, UZC J121246.5+105206, Z 69−88, VCC 66 .

NGC 4178 is the New General Catalogue identifier for a barred spiral galaxy in the equatorial constellation of Virgo. It was discovered April 11, 1825 by English astronomer John Herschel. Located some 43.8 million light years away, this galaxy spans 2.3 × 0.4 arc minutes and is seen at a low angle, being inclined by 77° to the line of sight from the Earth. The morphological classification of NGC 4178 is SB(rs)dm, indicating that it has a bar feature at the core, and, per the '(rs)', has traces of a ring-like structure surrounding the bar. The 'dm' suffix indicates the spiral arms are diffuse, broken, and irregular in appearance with no bulge at the nucleus. This galaxy is a member of the Virgo Cluster, which is the richest nearby group of galaxies outside the Local Group and forms the core of the Virgo Supercluster.

The radio continuum emission along the galaxy's major axis is asymmetrical, being brighter in the southwestern part than in the northeast. But the overall radio surface brightness is on the low side. In the mid-infrared range, the spectrum shows indications of high ionization levels usually associated with an active galactic nucleus. However, optical observations show no signs of an active nucleus, which may just mean it is heavily obscured. Indeed, the amount of ionized matter appears to increase near the core. Although this galaxy lacks a bulge that could supply mass to a supermassive black hole, a large black hole was detected at the core by the Chandra X-ray Observatory in 2012. It is inferred to have a mass of around 10^{4} to 10^{5} times the mass of the Sun. This makes it one of the lowest mass nuclear black holes known.

== Supernova ==
One supernova has been observed in NGC 4178. SN 1963I was discovered by G. V. Zaytsheva on 14 May 1963 at the Konkoly Observatory in Budapest. It was suspected of being a Type Ia supernova eruption, but this remains unconfirmed.
