= NGC 4561 =

Galaxy in the constellation Coma Berenices

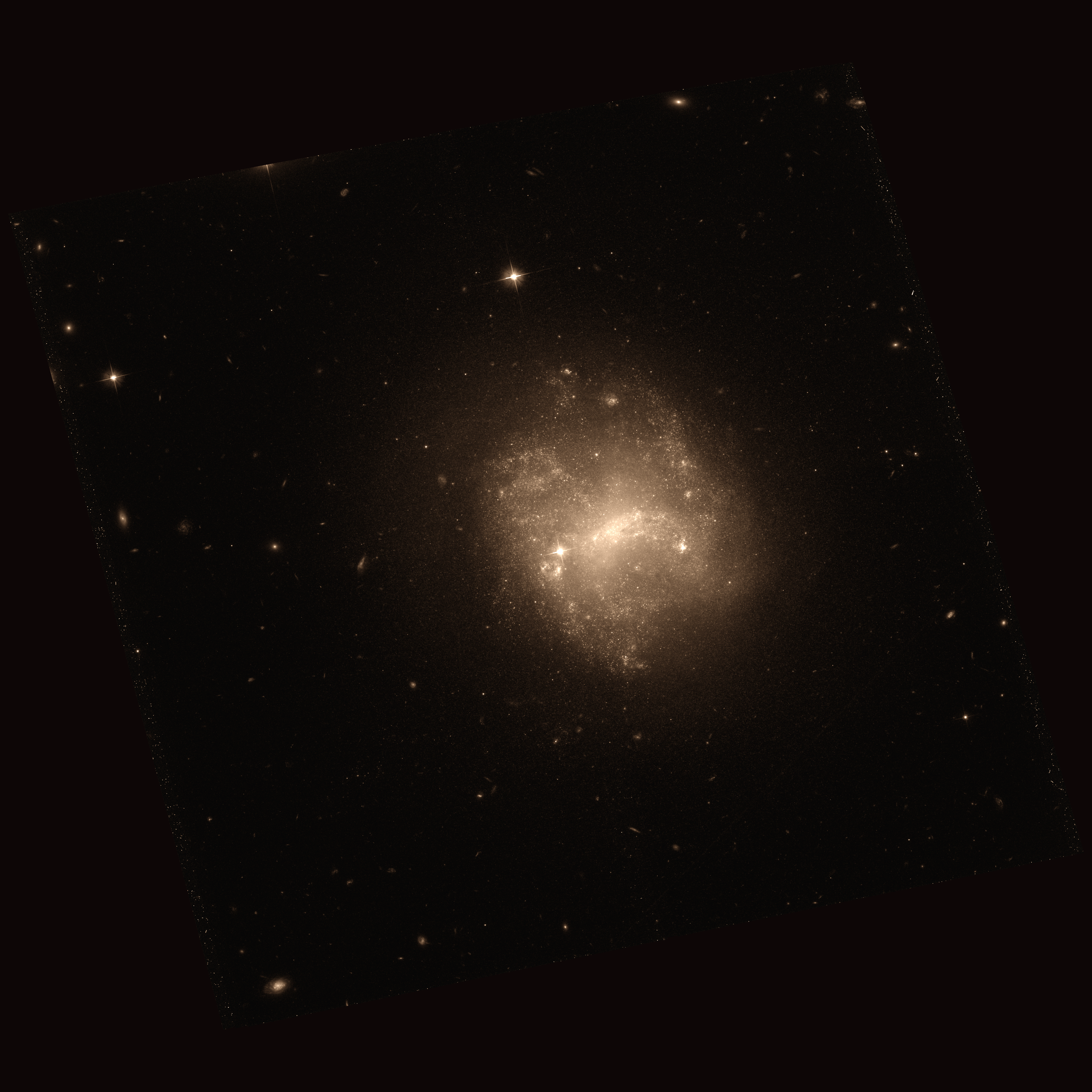
- Hubble Space Telescope image of NGC 4561

Observation data (J2000 epoch)
- Constellation: Coma Berenices
- Right ascension: 12^{h} 36^{m} 08.137^{s}
- Declination: +19° 19′ 21.32″
- Redshift: 0.00454±0.00020
- Heliocentric radial velocity: 1,410 km/s
- Distance: 82 ± 14 Mly (25.2 ± 4.3 Mpc)
- Group or cluster: Virgo Cluster
- Apparent magnitude (B): 12.70

Characteristics
- Type: SB(rs)dm, Sc(dSc)
- Number of stars: 1.23×10^{9} M_{☉}
- Apparent size (V): 0.727′ × 0.581′ (NIR)

Other designations
- 2MASX J12360813+1919213, NGC 4561, IC 3569, UGC 7768, PGC 42020

NGC 4561 is a barred spiral galaxy in the constellation Coma Berenices. It was discovered by German-British astronomer William Herschel on April 13, 1784. This galaxy is located at a distance of 82 ± 14 million light-years (25.2 ± 4.3 Mpc) from the Milky Way, and is a member of the Virgo Cluster of galaxies. It is 13th magnitude with an angular size of 1.5′.

The morphological classification of NGC 4561 in the De Vaucouleurs system is SB(rs)dm, indicating a barred spiral galaxy (SB) with a transitional inner ring structure (rs), loosely wound spiral arms (d), and an irregular appearance with no bulge component (m). The galactic plane is inclined at an angle of 28° to the plane of the sky, with the major axis aligned along a position angle of 60°. It has a star formation rate of 0.23 M_{☉}·yr^{−1}. The net stellar mass of the galaxy is 1.23×10^{9} M_{☉}.

A nuclear X-ray source was detected in NGC 4561 by Chandra, and was determined to be an active galactic nucleus based on XMM-Newton observations. It has a small supermassive black hole at the source, with a mass of at least 2×10^{4} M_{☉}.
