= NGC 4216 =

Galaxy in the constellation Virgo

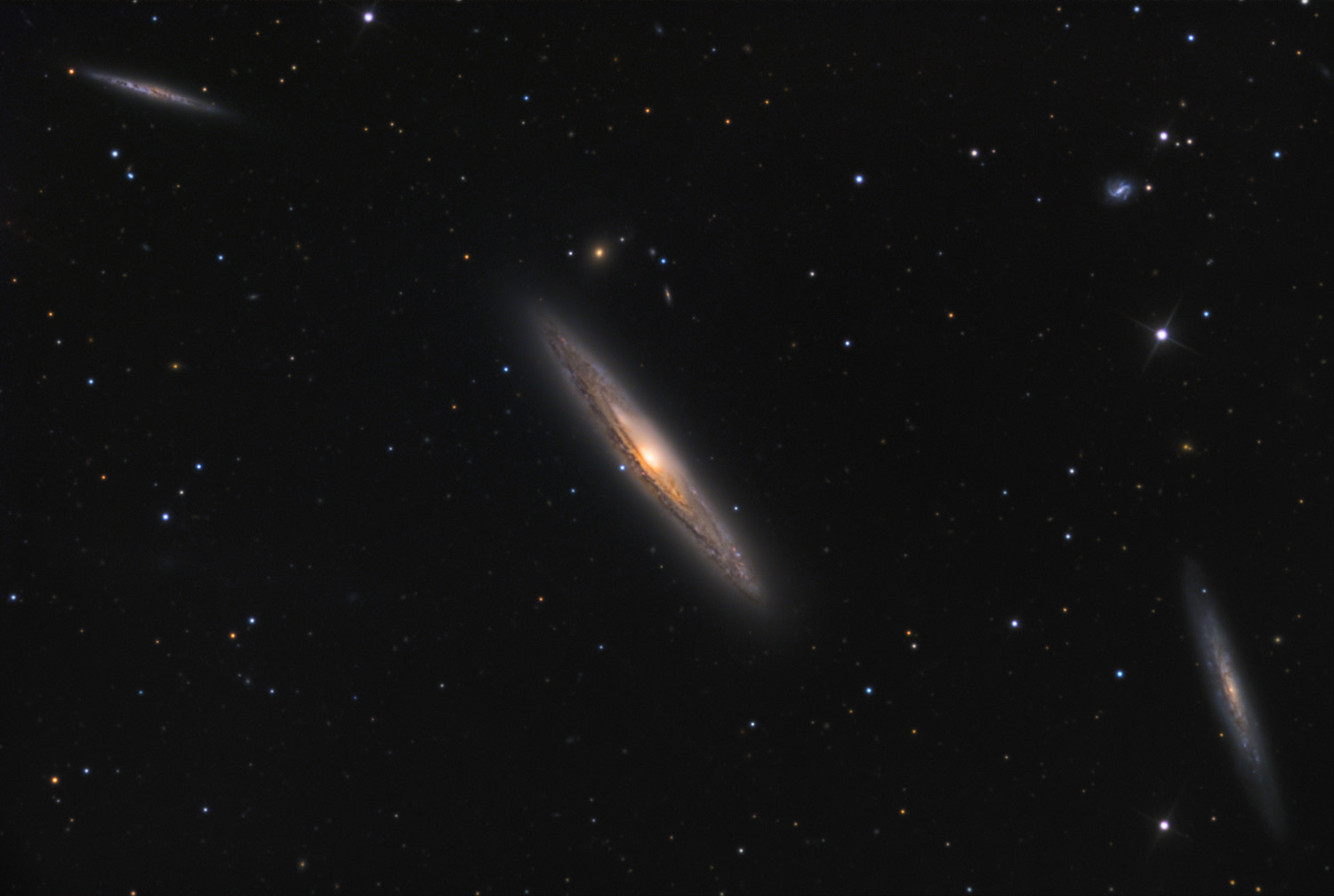
- NGC 4216 (center) imaged with a 24-inch telescope. The other two galaxies in the image are NGC 4206 (lower-right) and NGC 4222 (upper-left).

Observation data (J2000 epoch)
- Constellation: Virgo
- Right ascension: 12^{h} 15^{m} 54.3728^{s}
- Declination: +13° 08′ 58.08″
- Redshift: 0.000437
- Distance: 55 Mly
- Apparent magnitude (V): 10.3

Characteristics
- Type: SAB(s)b
- Size: 162,700 ly (49.90 kpc) (estimated)
- Apparent size (V): 8.1′ × 1.8′

Other designations
- VCC 167, HOLM 353A, IRAS 12133+1325, UGC 7284, MCG +02-31-072, PGC 39246, CGCG 069-112

NGC 4216, also known as the Silver Streak Galaxy or Weaver's Shuttle Galaxy, is a metal-rich intermediate spiral galaxy located not far from the center of the Virgo Cluster of galaxies, roughly 55 million light-years away. It was discovered by German-British astronomer William Herschel on 17 April 1784.

== Physical characteristics ==
Seen nearly edge-on, NGC 4216 is one of the largest and brightest spiral galaxies of the Virgo Cluster, with an absolute magnitude that has been estimated to be −22 (i.e.: brighter than the Andromeda Galaxy), and like most spiral galaxies of this cluster shows a deficiency of neutral hydrogen that is concentrated within the galaxy's optical disk and has a low surface density for a galaxy of its type. This explains why NGC 4216 is considered an anemic galaxy by some authors, also with a low star formation activity for a galaxy of its type. In fact, the galaxy's disk shows pillar-like structures that may have been caused by interactions with the intracluster medium of Virgo and/or with nearby galaxies.

In NGC 4216's halo, besides a rich system of globular clusters estimated to number around 700 (nearly five times more than the Milky Way), two stellar streams that are interpreted as two satellite galaxies being disrupted and absorbed by this galaxy are present.

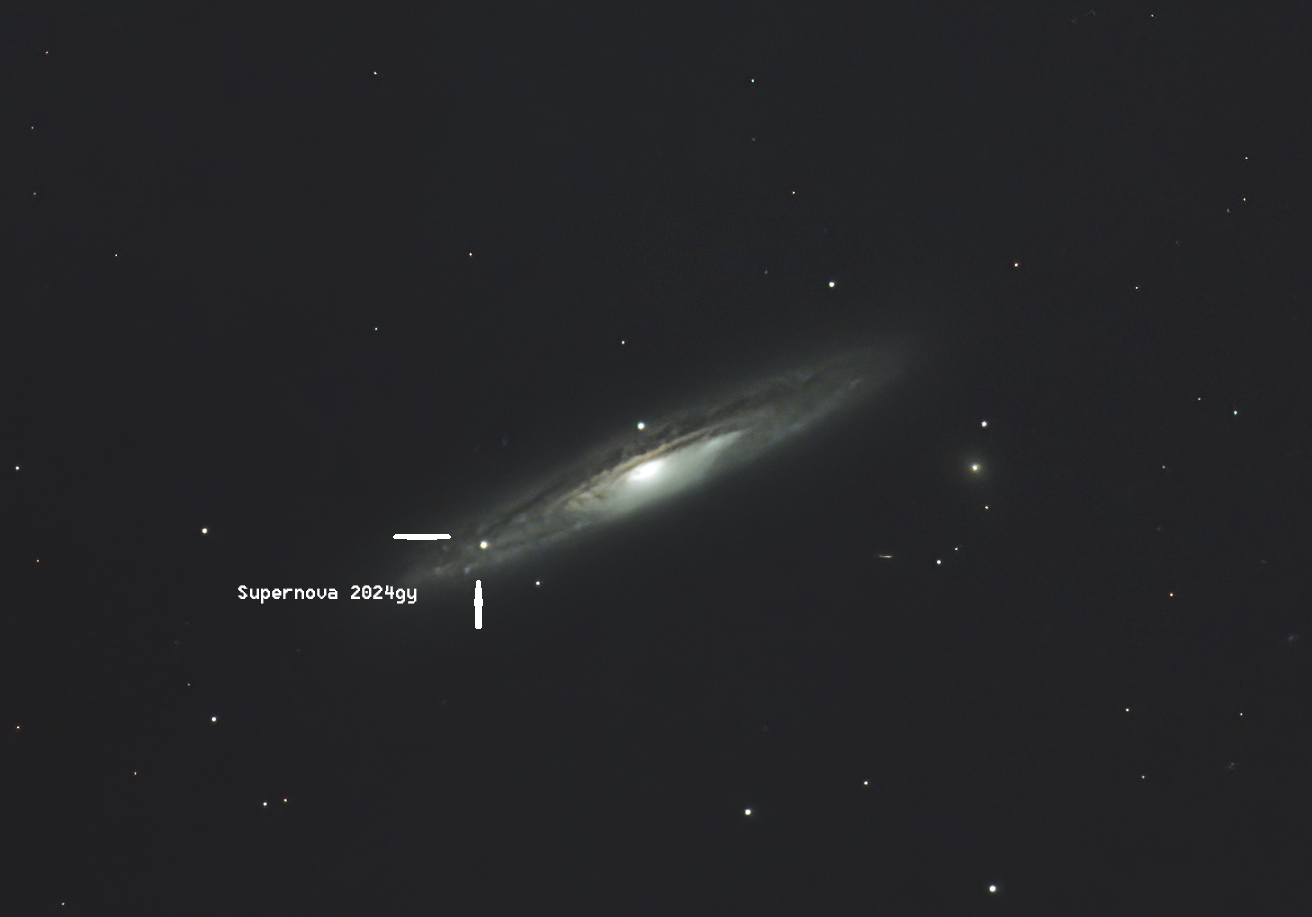
NGC 4216 with SN 2024gy

NGC 4216 seems to be in a place of the Virgo cluster where dwarf galaxies are being destroyed/accreted at a high rate, with it suffering many interactions with these types of galaxies.

One supernova has been observed in NGC 4216: SN 2024gy (Type Ia, mag. 16.3) was discovered by Kōichi Itagaki on 4 January 2024.

NGC 4216, along with NGC 4206, NGC 4222, and IC 771, are listed together as Holm 353 in Erik Holmberg's A Study of Double and Multiple Galaxies Together with Inquiries into some General Metagalactic Problems, published in 1937.

== See also ==
- List of NGC objects (4001–5000)
