= NGC 4659 =

Galaxy in the constellation Coma Berenices

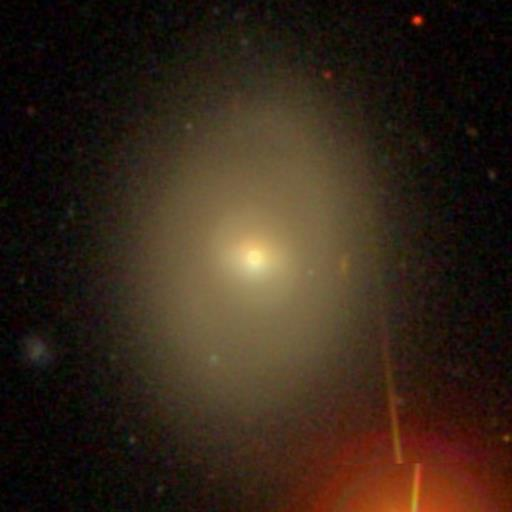
- SDSS image of NGC 4659.

Observation data (J2000 epoch)
- Constellation: Coma Berenices
- Right ascension: 12^{h} 44^{m} 29.4^{s}
- Declination: 13° 29′ 55″
- Redshift: 0.001600
- Heliocentric radial velocity: 480 km/s
- Distance: 54 Mly (16.5 Mpc)
- Group or cluster: Virgo Cluster
- Apparent magnitude (V): 12.9

Characteristics
- Type: S0/a
- Size: ~6,700 ly (2.04 kpc) (estimated)
- Apparent size (V): 1.76 x 1.12

Other designations
- CGCG 71-24, MCG 2-33-7, PGC 42913, UGC 7915, VCC 1999

NGC 4659 is a lenticular galaxy located about 54 million light-years away in the constellation Coma Berenices. NGC 4659 was discovered by astronomer William Herschel on April 12, 1784 and is a member of the Virgo Cluster.

== See also ==
- List of NGC objects (4001–5000)
