= NGC 4464 =

Galaxy in the constellation of Virgo

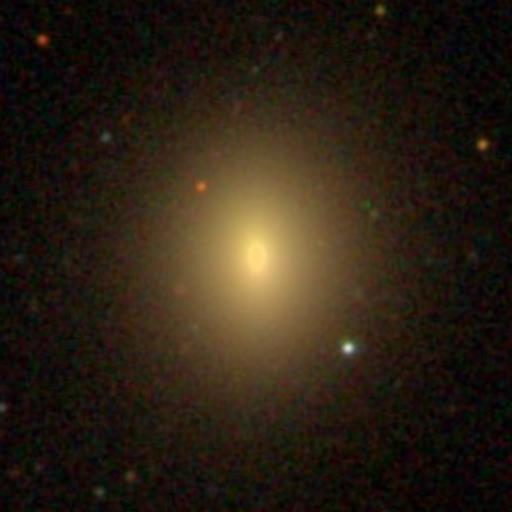
- SDSS image of NGC 4464.

Observation data (J2000 epoch)
- Constellation: Virgo
- Right ascension: 12^{h} 29^{m} 21.3^{s}
- Declination: 08° 09′ 24″
- Redshift: 0.004146/1243 km/s
- Distance: 70,459,200 ly
- Group or cluster: Virgo Cluster
- Apparent magnitude (V): 13.46

Characteristics
- Type: E3
- Size: ~18,908 ly (estimated)
- Apparent size (V): 1.1 x 0.8

Other designations
- CGCG 42-128, MCG 1-32-78, PGC 41148, UGC 7619, VCC 1178

NGC 4464 is an elliptical galaxy located about 70 million light-years away in the constellation of Virgo. NGC 4464 was discovered by astronomer William Herschel on December 28, 1785. NGC 4464 is a member of the Virgo Cluster.

== See also ==
- List of NGC objects (4001–5000)
