= NGC 4654 =

Galaxy in the constellation Virgo

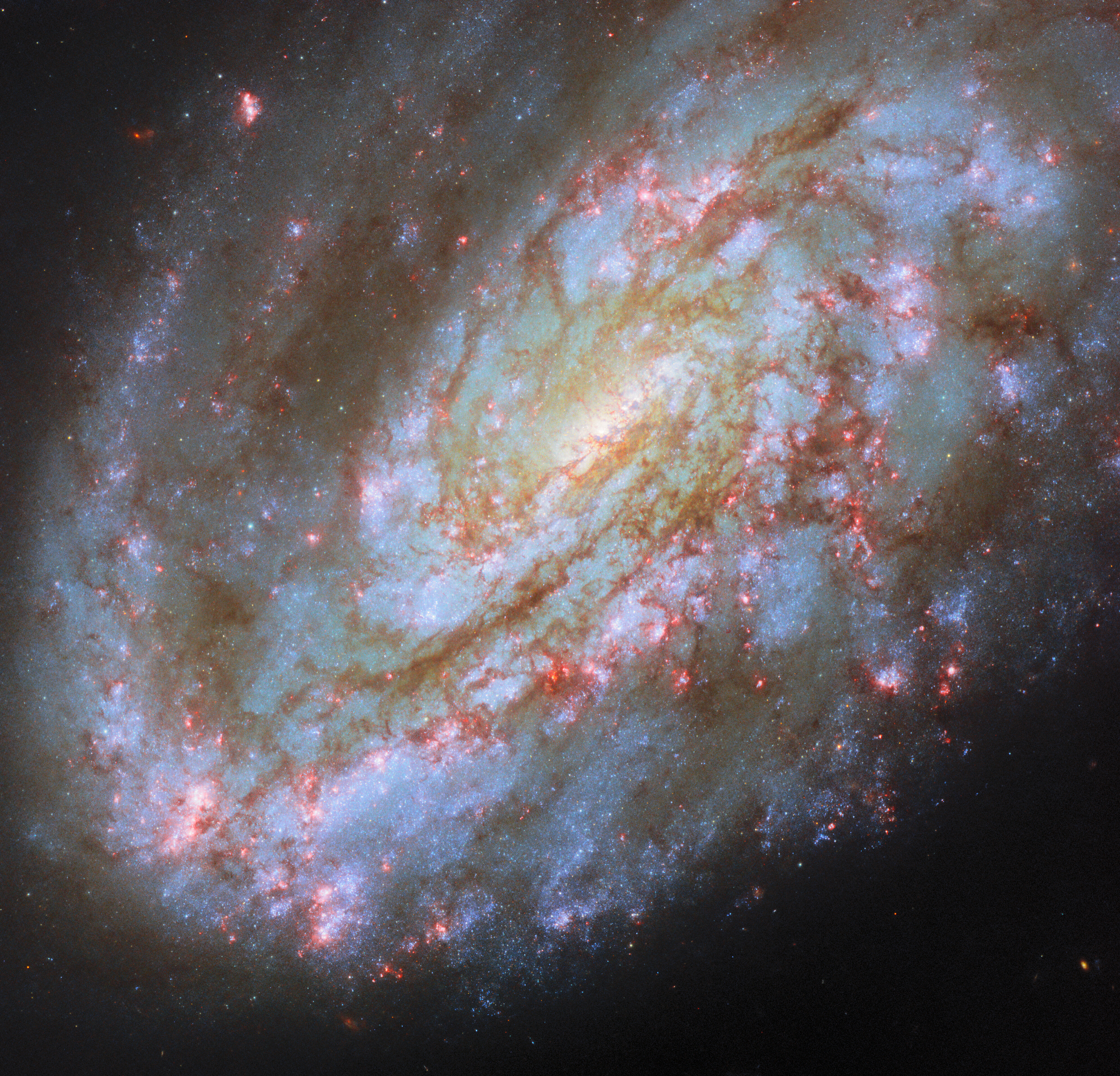
- NGC 4654 imaged by the Hubble Space Telescope

Observation data (J2000 epoch)
- Constellation: Virgo
- Right ascension: 12^{h} 43^{m} 56.6238^{s}
- Declination: +13° 07′ 35.711″
- Redshift: 0.003456±0.00000500
- Heliocentric radial velocity: 1,036±1 km/s
- Distance: 47.97 ± 1.75 Mly (14.708 ± 0.536 Mpc)
- Group or cluster: Virgo Cluster
- Apparent magnitude (V): 10.4

Characteristics
- Type: SAB(rs)cd
- Size: ~88,600 ly (27.17 kpc) (estimated)
- Apparent size (V): 5.0′ × 2.1′

Other designations
- VCC 1987, IRAS 12414+1324, 2MASX J12435663+1307348, UGC 7902, MCG +02-33-004, PGC 42857, CGCG 071-019

NGC 4654 is an intermediate barred spiral galaxy in the constellation of Virgo. Its velocity with respect to the cosmic microwave background is 1,356±22 km/s, which corresponds to a Hubble distance of 65.2 ± 4.7 Mly (20.00 ± 1.44 Mpc). However, 34 non-redshift measurements give a closer mean distance of 47.97 ± 1.75 Mly (14.708 ± 0.536 Mpc).. It was discovered by German-British astronomer William Herschel on 12 April 1784. It is bright enough that it can be seen using amateur telescopes.

== Physical characteristics ==
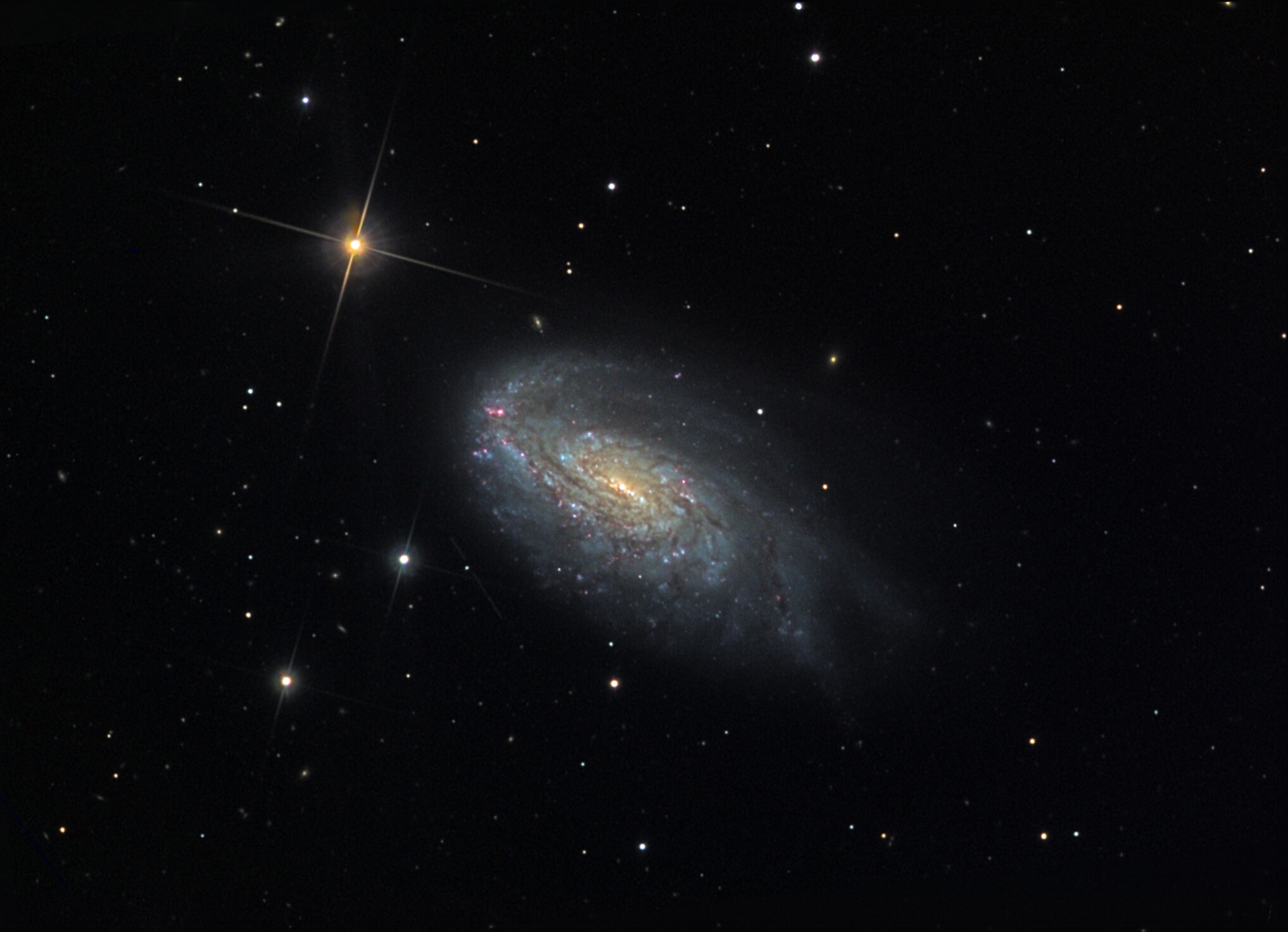
NGC 4654 imaged by Kitt Peak National Observatory

NGC 4654 is a member of the Virgo Cluster of galaxies that shows peculiarities in the distribution of both its atomic hydrogen and molecular hydrogen as well as an asymmetry on the distribution of its stars, with the atomic hydrogen being compressed in the galaxy's northwestern part and forming a tail on its southeastern part. While interactions with Virgo's intracluster medium - that is stripping NGC 4654 of its gas as the galaxy moves through it - can explain its gas distribution, it is unable to explain the peculiarities in the distribution of its stars. It has been proposed that NGC 4654 interacted with its neighbor the spiral galaxy NGC 4639 about 500 million years ago; this, combined with weak ram-pressure stripping due to its motion within the Virgo cluster, may explain its features.

Despite suffering a loss of its neutral gas, NGC 4654 does not suffer the deficiency of it that is shown in many spiral galaxies of the Virgo cluster and also has the star formation typical for a galaxy of its type.

== See also ==
- Messier 88, another spiral galaxy of the Virgo cluster currently suffering ram-pressure stripping.
- NGC 4457
- List of NGC objects (4001–5000)
