= GAFO Region =

Isolated region of star formation

GAFO region
Nebula
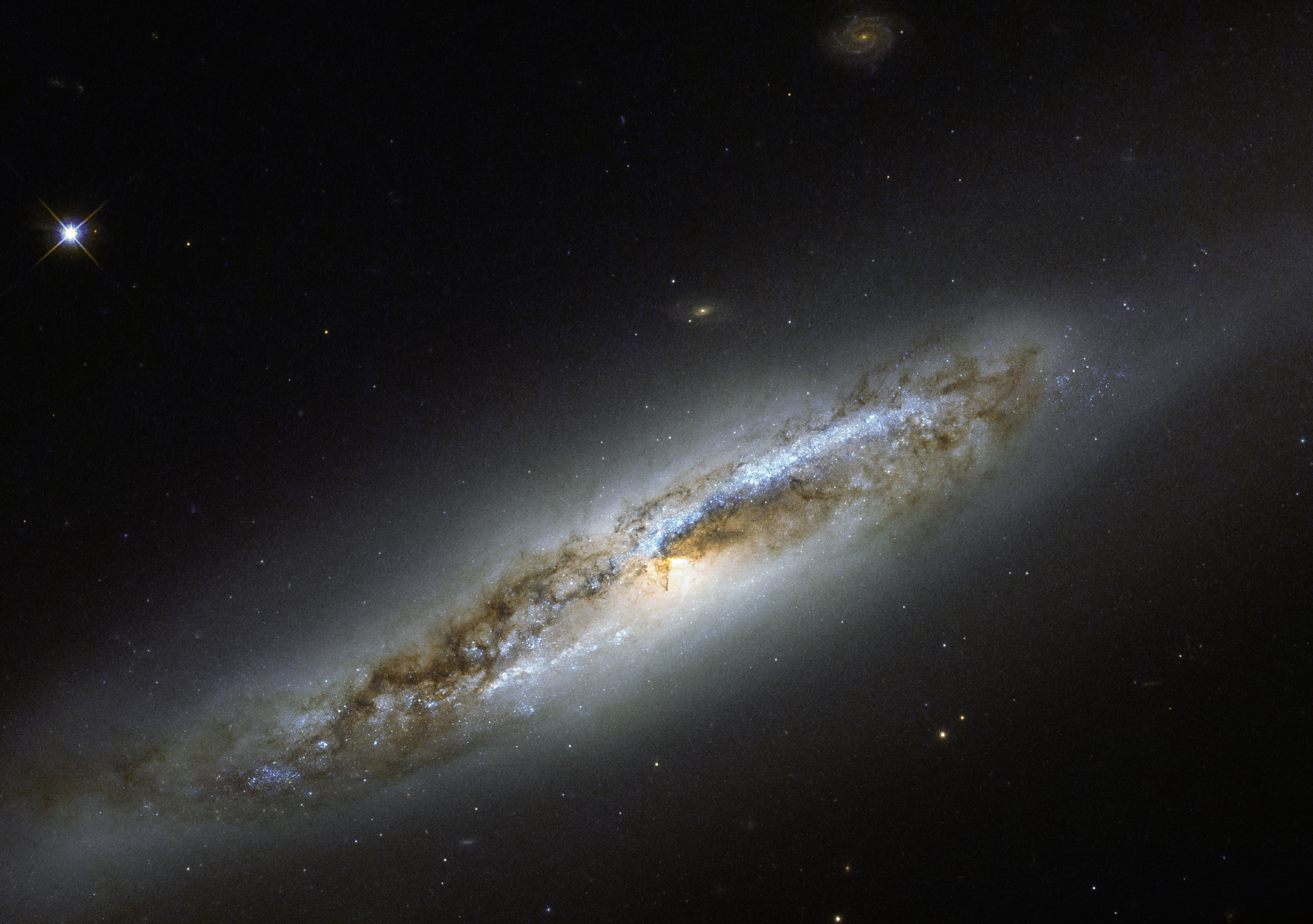
- The GAFO region is located nearby NGC 4388, about 17 kpc north and 4.4 kpc west

Observation data
- Constellation: Virgo
- Notable features: Located in or near intracluster space

The GAFO region is an H II region of star formation that is located in the constellation of Virgo near an active spiral galaxy known as NGC 4388. It is located 17 kiloparsecs to the north and 4.4 kiloparsecs to the west of the galaxy placing it either inside its diffuse outer halo or in intracluster space. This object has an age of just ~3 million years and has a mass of ~400 solar masses.

The GAFO region shows that star formation can take place even outside of the main star forming regions of galaxies.
