= NGC 4450 =

Spiral galaxy in the constellation Coma Berenices

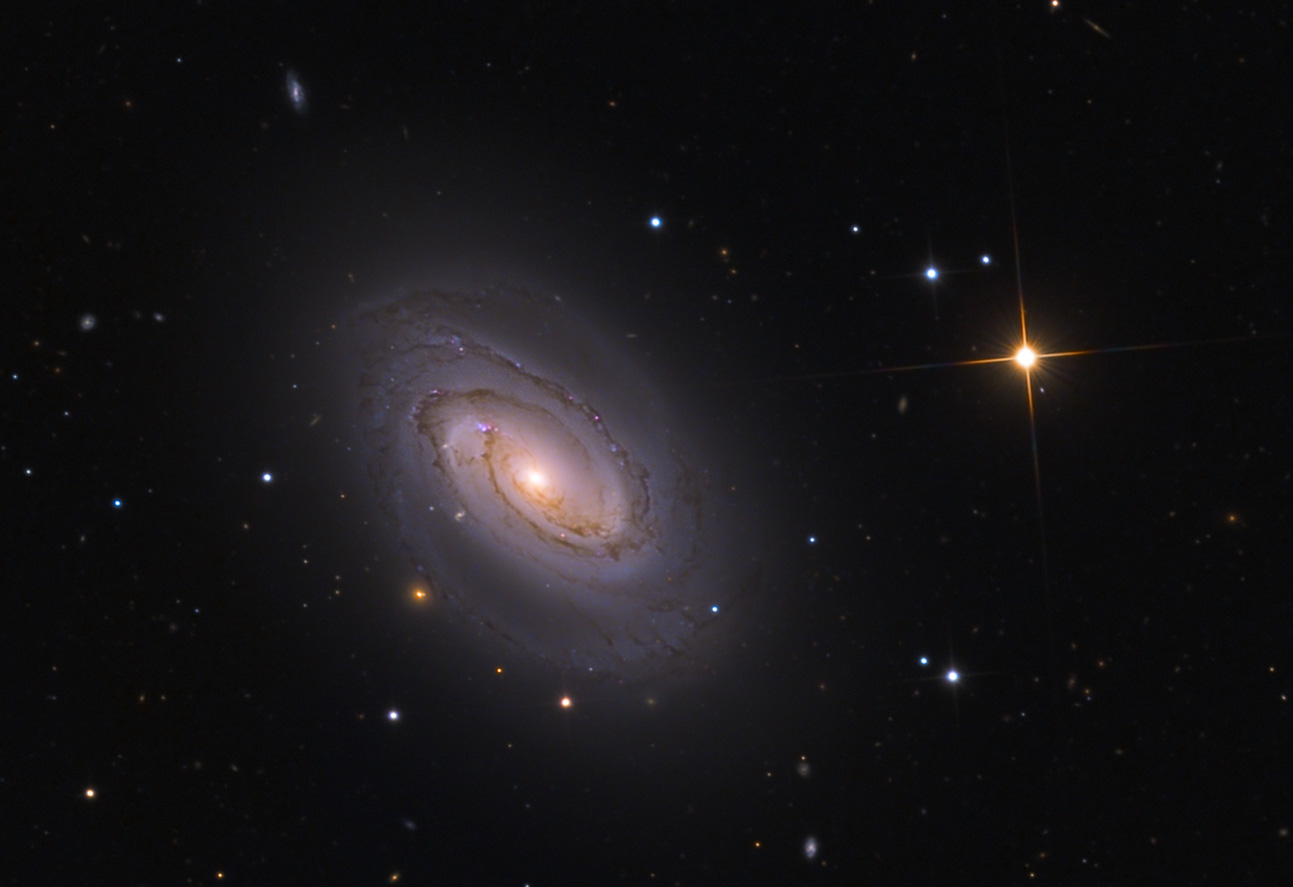
- NGC 4450 as taken from Mount Lemmon SkyCenter

Observation data (J2000 epoch)
- Constellation: Coma Berenices
- Right ascension: 12^{h} 28^{m} 29.6^{s}
- Declination: +17° 05′ 06″
- Redshift: 1,954±4 km/s
- Distance: ~50 million light-years
- Apparent magnitude (V): 10.1

Characteristics
- Type: SA(s)ab
- Size: ~75,000 ly (diameter)
- Apparent size (V): 5.4′ × 4.1′

Other designations
- NGC 4450, UGC 7594, PGC 41024

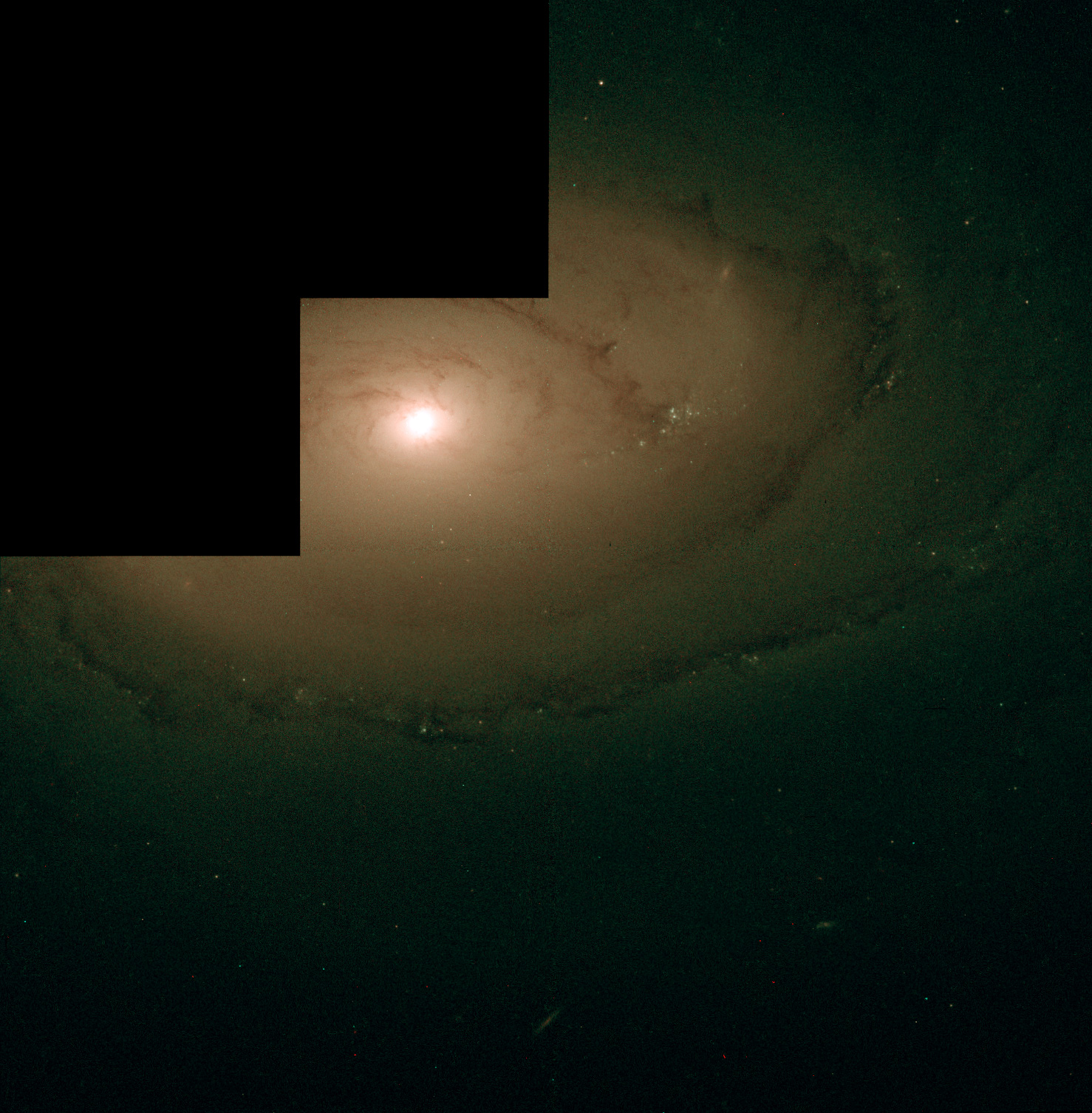
NGC 4450 imaged by the Hubble Space Telescope

NGC 4450 is a spiral galaxy in the constellation of Coma Berenices. It has an apparent visual magnitude of 10.1 and spans an angular size of 5.4′ × 4.1′.

== Characteristics ==
NGC 4450 is a member of the Virgo Cluster that, like Messier 90, shows smooth, nearly featureless spiral arms, with few star formation regions and little neutral hydrogen compared to other similar spiral galaxies, something that justifies its classification as an anemic galaxy.

Measurements with the help of the Hubble Space Telescope show the center of this galaxy has a supermassive black hole.
