= NGC 4498 =

Galaxy in the constellation Coma Berenices

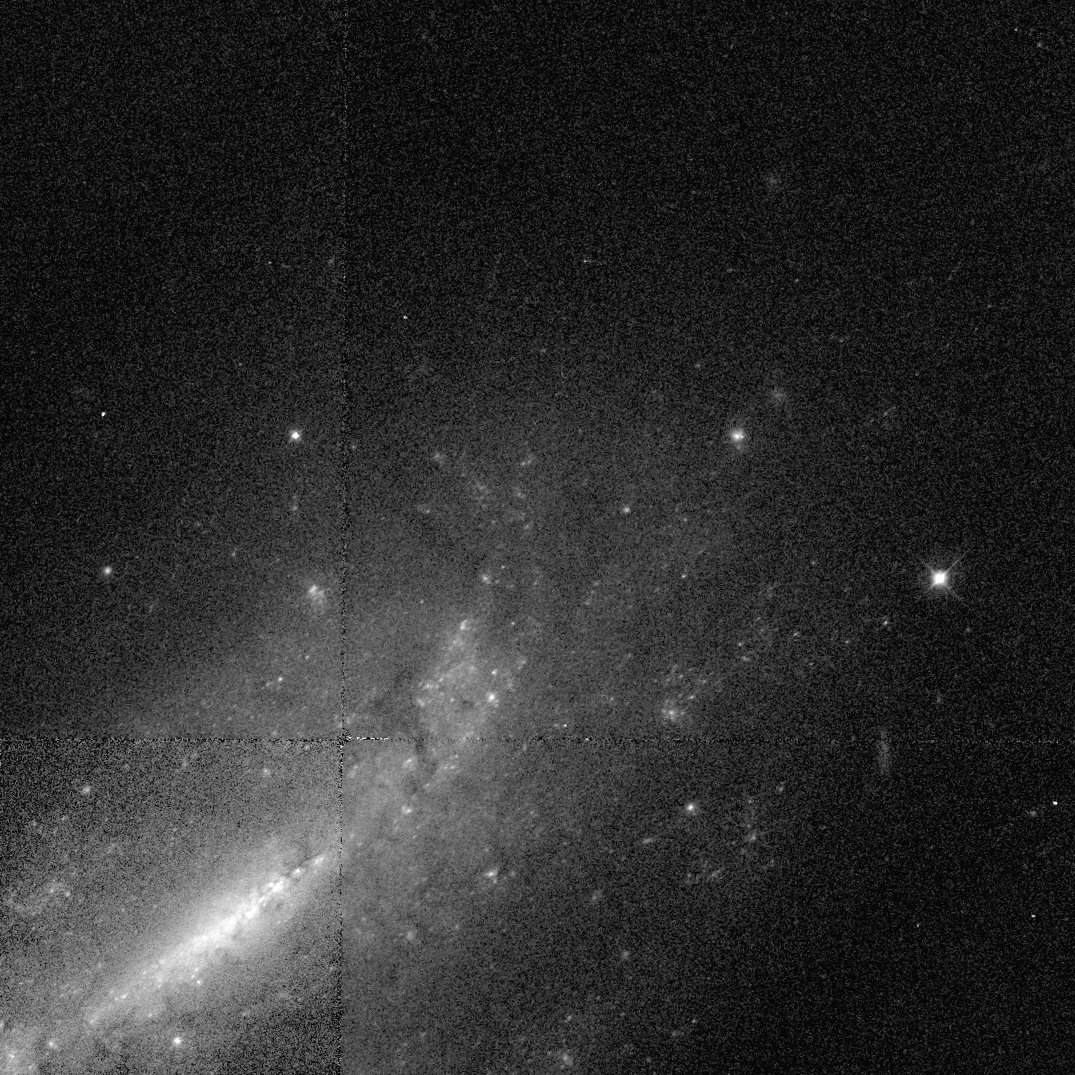
- Hubble Space Telescope image of NGC 4498.

Observation data (J2000 epoch)
- Constellation: Coma Berenices
- Right ascension: 12^{h} 31^{m} 39.5^{s}
- Declination: 16° 51′ 10″
- Redshift: 0.005027/1507 km/s
- Distance: 52,622,920 ly
- Group or cluster: Virgo Cluster
- Apparent magnitude (V): 12.79

Characteristics
- Type: SAB(s)d
- Size: ~53,560 ly (estimated)
- Apparent size (V): 3.0 x 1.6

Other designations
- PGC 41472, UGC 7669, VCC 1379

NGC 4498 is a barred spiral galaxy located about 50 million light-years away in the constellation Coma Berenices. NGC 4498 was discovered by astronomer William Herschel on March 21, 1784. NGC 4498 is a member of the Virgo Cluster.

== See also ==
- List of NGC objects (4001–5000)

== Gallery ==
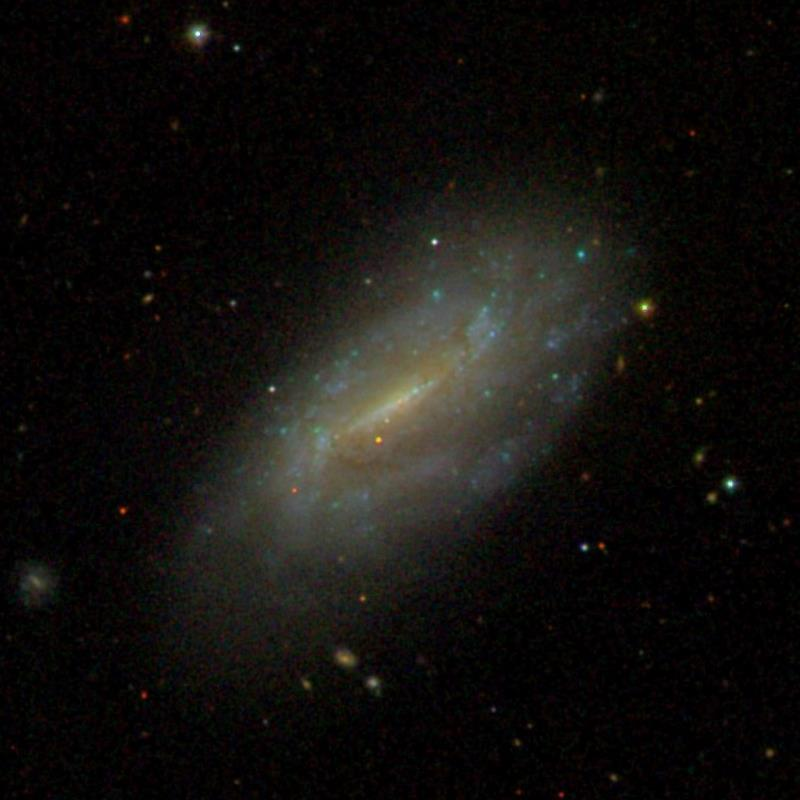
NGC 4498 (SDSS DR14)
