= NGC 4388 =

Galaxy in the constellation Virgo

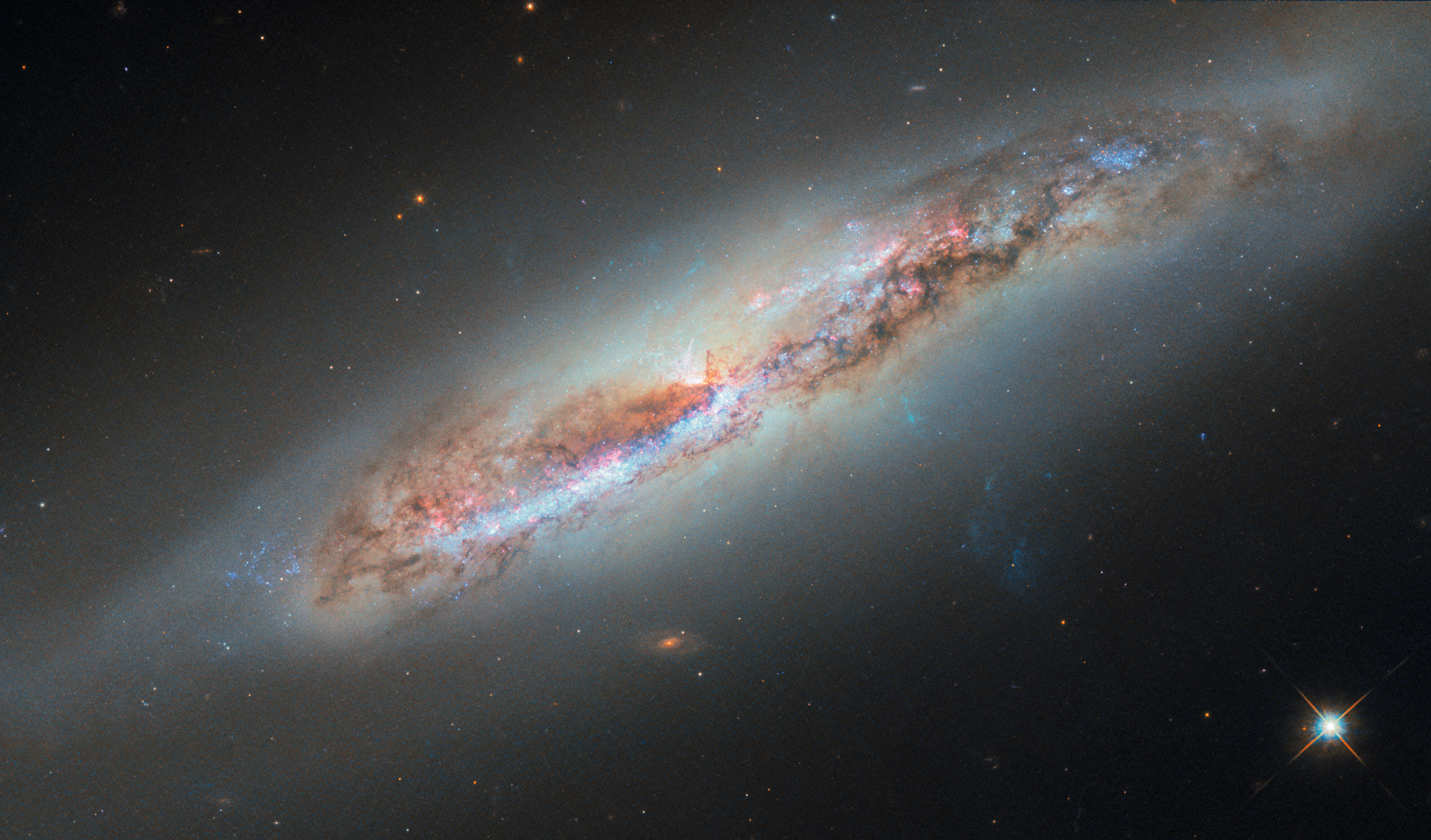
- Hubble Space Telescope image of NGC 4388

Observation data (J2000 epoch)
- Constellation: Virgo
- Right ascension: 12^{h} 25^{m} 46.820^{s}
- Declination: +12° 39′ 43.45″
- Redshift: 0.008419
- Heliocentric radial velocity: 2,524 km/s
- Distance: 56.7 Mly (17.4 Mpc)
- Group or cluster: Virgo Cluster
- Apparent magnitude (V): 11.02
- Apparent magnitude (B): 11.76

Characteristics
- Type: SA(s)b
- Mass: 26.4+16.4 −10.1×10^{9} M_{☉}
- Size: 53.42 kpc (174,150 ly) (diameter; 25.0 mag/arcsec^{2} B-band isophote)
- Apparent size (V): 6.2′ × 1.674′

Other designations
- VCC 836, HOLM 403C, IRAS 12232+1256, UGC 7520, MCG +02-32-041, PGC 40581, CGCG 070-068

NGC 4388 is an active spiral galaxy in the equatorial constellation of Virgo. This galaxy is located at a distance of 57 million light years and is receding with a radial velocity of 2,524 km/s. It is one of the brightest galaxies of the Virgo Cluster due to its luminous nucleus. NGC 4388 is located 1.3° to the west of the cluster center, which translates to a projected distance of ≈400 kpc. The NGC 4388 galaxy has been assigned a morphological class of SA(s)b, which indicates it is a spiral with no central bar (SA) or inner ring structure (s), and has moderately-wound spiral arms (b). It is inclined at an angle of 79° to the line of sight from the Earth and thus is being viewed from nearly edge-on. The major axis of the elliptical profile is aligned with a position angle of 92°. It was discovered by German-British astronomer William Herschel on April 17, 1784.

== Characteristics ==
The interstellar medium of the galaxy has recently undergone a stripping event due to ram pressure, causing star formation to steeply decline some 190±30 Myr ago. The galaxy may have passed close to the cluster center around 200 Myr ago, which led to the loss of much of its neutral hydrogen from interaction with the inter-cluster medium.

This is a classic Type II Seyfert galaxy where the emission from the active galactic nucleus is being concealed by a torus of obscuring gas and dust. The supermassive black hole at the core has a mass of (8.5±0.2)×10^{6} M_{☉}, which has a hot corona with a temperature energy of 80+40
−20 keV that is producing X-ray emission. There is a strong nuclear outflow to the north and south that extends out as far as 5 kpc from the core. These flows have a mean velocity of 270±70 km·s^{−1}.

NGC 4388 has a large extended emission-line region (EELR) that has a length of around 35 kpc, stretching beyond the galaxy. This emission cloud is created when the supermassive black hole is active and its radiation ionizes gas from its galaxy. In the case of NGC 4388 it is suggested that the gas was first stripped from the galaxy either via tidal interaction or via ram pressure and later ionized. A small H II region, known as the GAFO Region, ionised by a 3.3 million years old star cluster, is located within this region.

== Supernova ==
One supernova has been observed in NGC 4388: SN 2023fyq (Type Ibn, mag. 19.5 at discovery) was discovered by the Zwicky Transient Facility on 17 April 2023. The supernova brightened slowly from discovery until 24 July 2023, when Kōichi Itagaki photographed it at magnitude 13.3. Originally classified as a Type Ib-pec, it was later designated as Type Ibn.

== Gallery ==
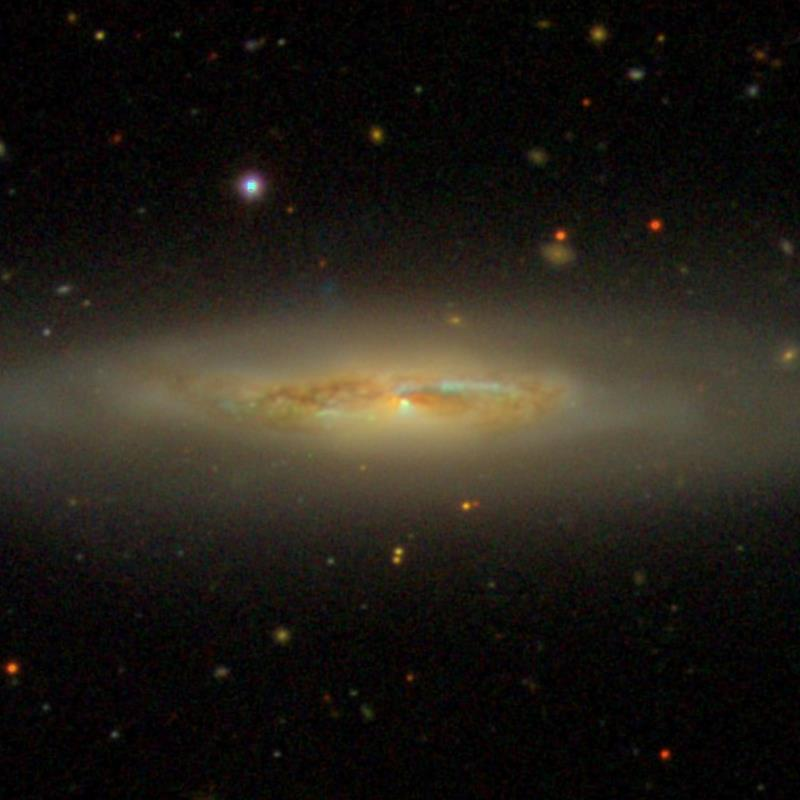
NGC 4388 (SDSS DR14)

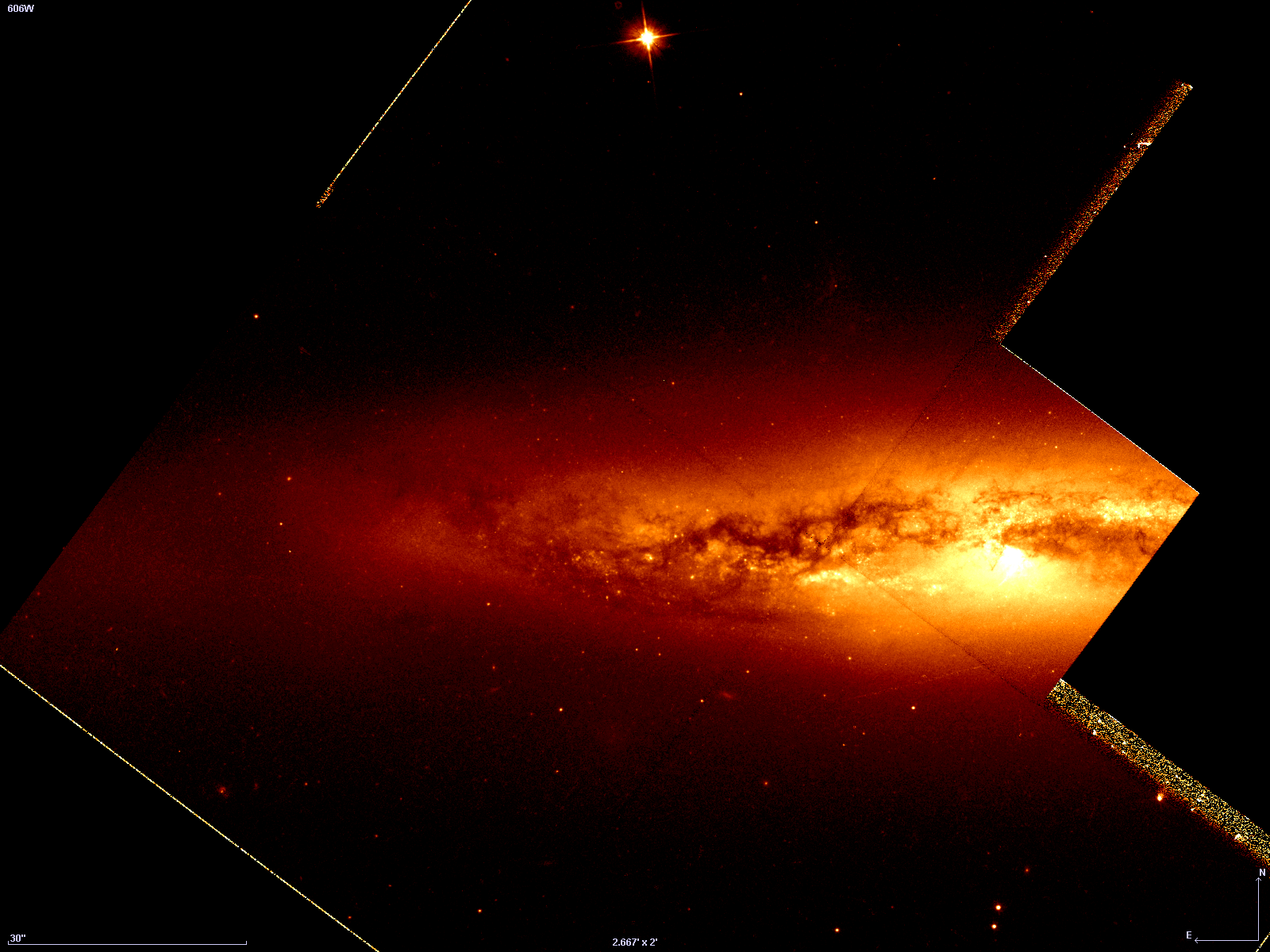
NGC 4388 (HST)

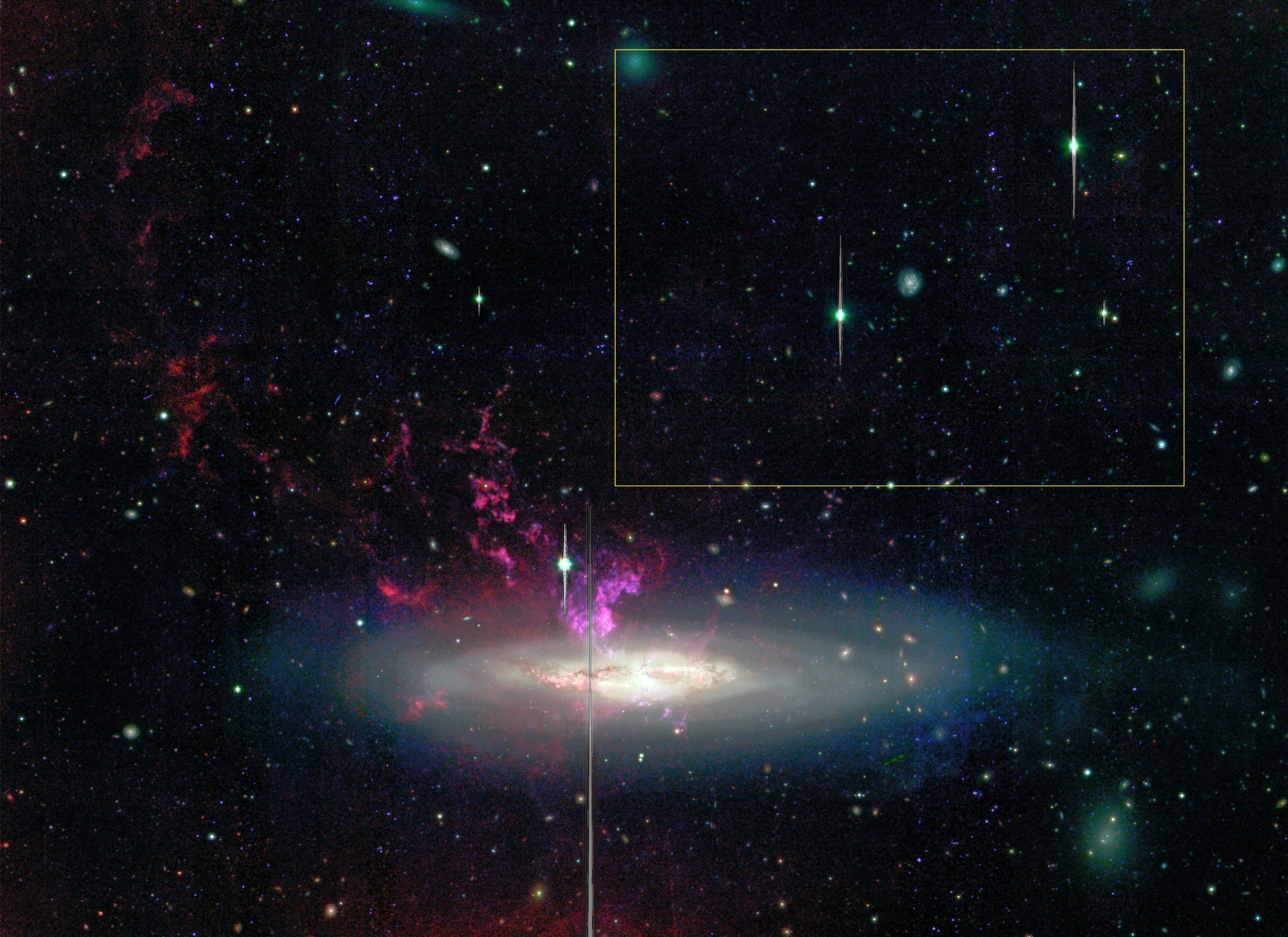
Image with Subaru Telescope, showing an EELR around NGC 4388.

== See also ==
- List of NGC objects (4001–5000)
