= NGC 4206 =

Spiral galaxy in the constellation Virgo

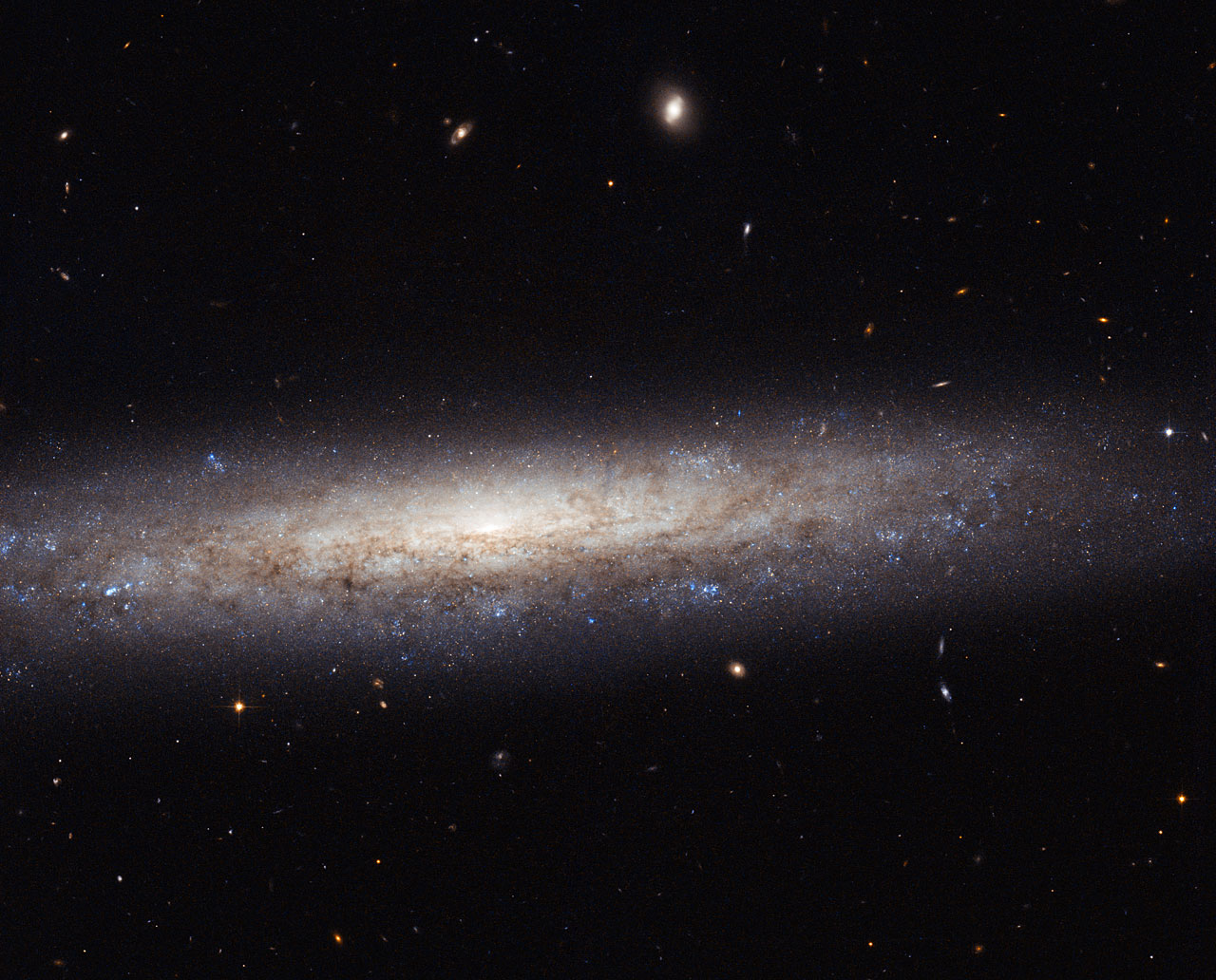
- NGC 4206 image taken with the NASA/ESA Hubble Space Telescope

Observation data (J2000 epoch)
- Constellation: Virgo
- Right ascension: 12^{h} 15^{m} 16.8^{s}
- Declination: 13° 01′ 26.4″
- Redshift: 0.00236
- Heliocentric radial velocity: 707 km/s
- Galactocentric velocity: 643 ± 3 km/s
- Distance: 67 Mly (20.4 Mpc)
- Group or cluster: Virgo Cluster
- Apparent magnitude (V): 12.15
- Apparent magnitude (B): 12.82

Characteristics
- Type: SA(s)bc?
- Size: ~98,000 ly (30.1 kpc) (estimated)
- Apparent size (V): 5.18 x 0.77

Other designations
- IRAS 12127+1318, PGC 39183,2MASX J12151687+1301258, MCG+02-31-066, HIPASS J1215+13, IC 3064, UGC 7260

NGC 4206 is a spiral galaxy located about 70 million light-years away from Earth in the constellation of Virgo. The galaxy is visible with most moderate amateur telescopes at 13th magnitude. It was discovered by British astronomer William Herschel on 17 April 1784 and is a member of the Virgo Cluster.
