= NGC 4550 =

Galaxy in the constellation Virgo

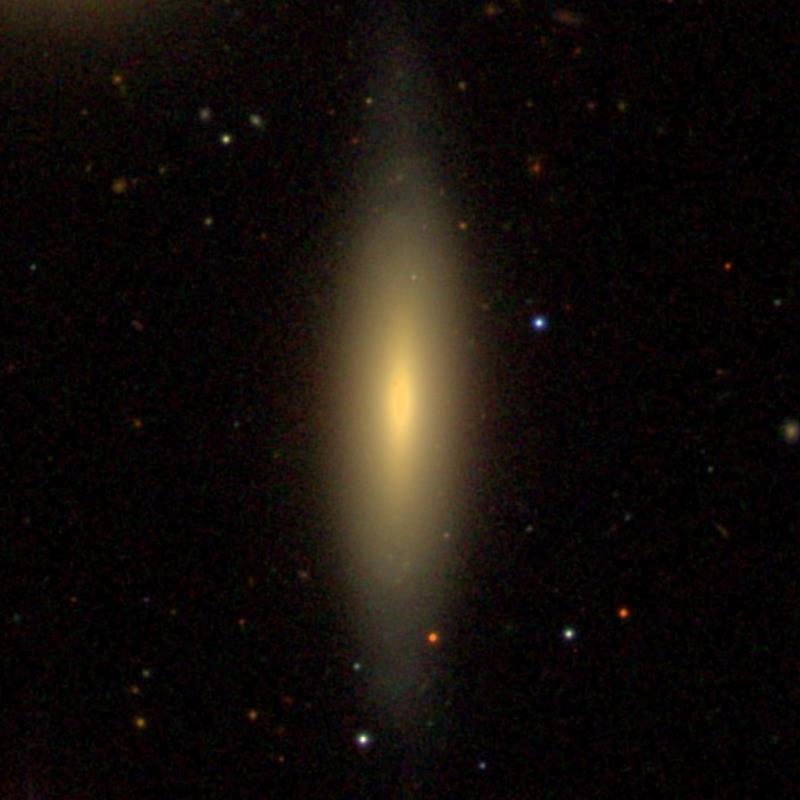
- SDSS image of NGC 4550

Observation data (J2000 epoch)
- Constellation: Virgo
- Right ascension: 12^{h} 35^{m} 30.6^{s}
- Declination: +12° 13′ 15″
- Redshift: 381±9 km/s
- Distance: 50.0 Mly (15.3 Mpc)
- Apparent magnitude (V): 121.5

Characteristics
- Type: SB(s)0^{0}
- Apparent size (V): 3.3′ × 0.9′

Other designations
- NGC 4550, UGC 7757, PGC 41943

NGC 4550 is a barred lenticular galaxy located in the constellation of Virgo that can be seen with amateur telescopes. It lies at a distance of 50 million light-years (15.5 mega parsecs) from the Milky Way and is a member of the Virgo Cluster. It was discovered in 1784 by William Herschel.

== Physical characteristics ==
While NGC 4550 is not one of the brightest galaxies of the Virgo Cluster, it is notable as it is one of the few galaxies where a large fraction of its stars rotate around the galaxy's center in opposite direction to the others.

About her research article on this galaxy, Vera Rubin wrote: "I discovered from observations of NGC 4550 that in the single disk of this galaxy, half the stars orbit clockwise, and half the stars orbit counterclockwise, both systems intermingled. This observation required that many astronomers modify the manner in which they measured velocities, for computer programs were not then equipped to handle such complexity." She mentions and takes pleasure in the fact that the discovery was made at age 63.

Another, brighter, example is the spiral galaxy NGC 7217. The stars of this galaxy are concentrated in two disks of similar size and surface brightness, one nested within the other and it has been suggested it is the product of the merger between two previous disk galaxies, each one counter-rotating with respect to the other.

NGC 4550's center also shows a small amount of molecular hydrogen and interstellar dust, the latter concentrated in a disk surrounding its core where star formation is taking place albeit at a very modest level.
