= Messier 49 =

Elliptical galaxy in the constellation Virgo

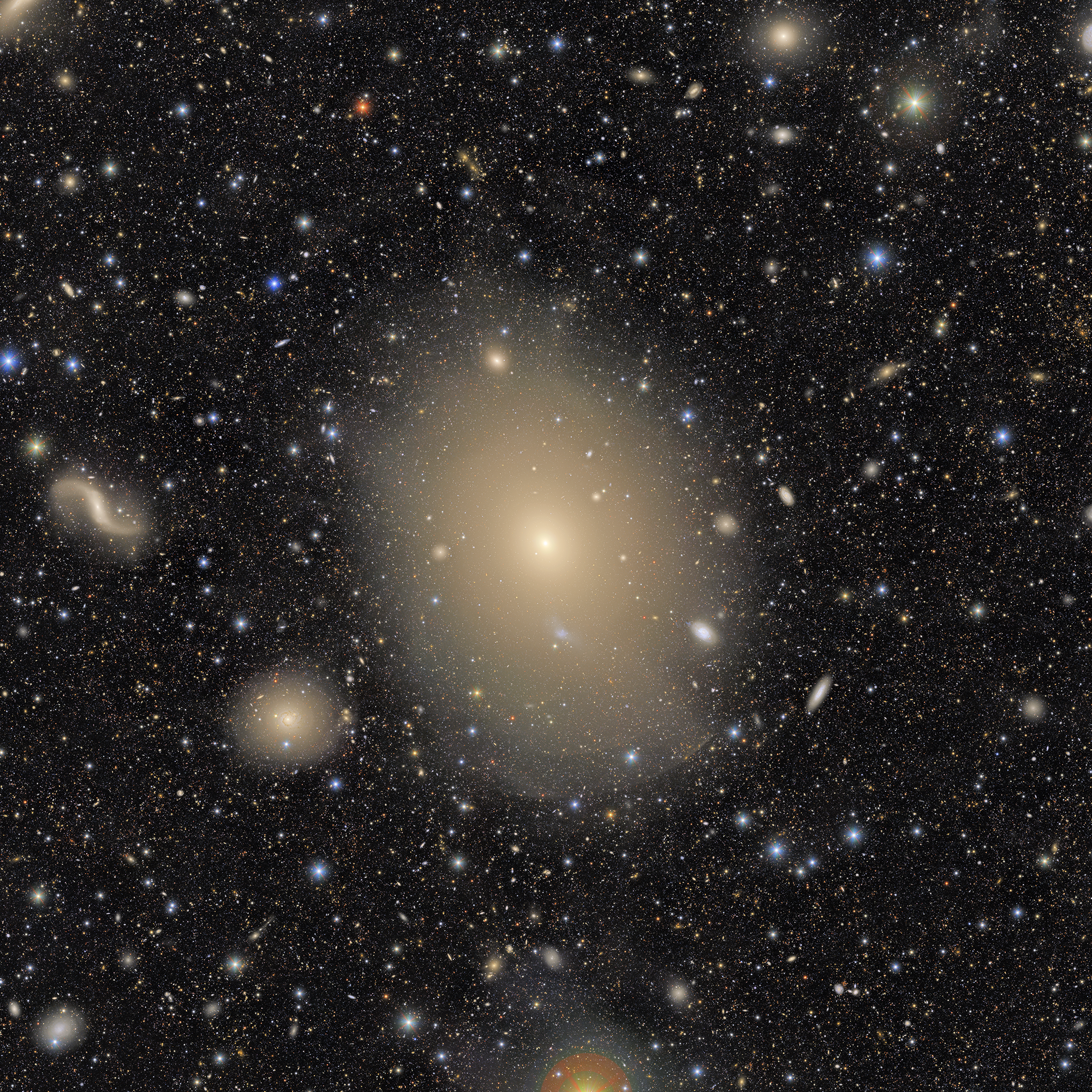
- Messier 49 imaged by the Vera C. Rubin Observatory

Observation data (J2000 epoch)
- Constellation: Virgo
- Right ascension: 12^{h} 29^{m} 46.7^{s}
- Declination: +08° 00′ 02″
- Redshift: 0.003326±0.000022
- Heliocentric radial velocity: 997±7 km/s
- Galactocentric velocity: 929±7 km/s
- Distance: 55.9 ± 2.3 Mly (17.14 ± 0.71 Mpc)
- Apparent magnitude (V): 8.4

Characteristics
- Type: E2, LINER
- Size: 48.80 kiloparsecs (159,000 light-years) (diameter; 25.0 mag/arcsec^{2} B-band isophote)
- Apparent size (V): 10.2 × 8.3 moa

Other designations
- NGC 4472, UGC 7629, PGC 41220, Arp 134
- References: SIMBAD: Search M49

Messier 49 (also known as M49 or NGC 4472) is a giant elliptical galaxy about 56 million light-years away in the equatorial constellation of Virgo. This galaxy was discovered by astronomer Charles Messier in 1777. (Note: On February 16)

As an elliptical galaxy, Messier 49 has the physical form of a radio galaxy, but it only has the radio emission of a normal galaxy. From the detected radio emission, the core region has roughly 10^{53} erg (10^{46} J or 10^{22} YJ) of synchrotron energy. The nucleus of this galaxy is emitting X-rays, suggesting the likely presence of a supermassive black hole with an estimated mass of 5.65 × 10^{8} solar masses, or 565 million times the mass of the Sun (M_{☉}). (Note: As is normal in extra-solar system astronomic general dimensions, these are all mid-range estimates) X-ray emissions shows a structure to the north of Messier 49 that resembles a bow shock. To the southwest of the core, the luminous outline of the galaxy can be traced out to a distance of 260 kpc.

This galaxy has many globular clusters: estimated to be about 5,900. This is far more than the roughly 200 orbiting the Milky Way, but dwarfed by the 13,450 orbiting the supergiant elliptical galaxy Messier 87. On average, the globular clusters of M49 are about 10 billion years old. Between 2000 and 2009, strong evidence for a stellar mass black hole was discovered in one. A second candidate was announced in 2011.

Messier 49 was the first member of the Virgo Cluster of galaxies to be discovered. It is the most luminous member of that cluster and more luminous than any galaxy closer to the Earth. This galaxy forms part of the smaller Virgo B subcluster 4.5° away from the dynamic center of the Virgo Cluster, centered on Messier 87. Messier 49 is gravitationally interacting with the dwarf irregular galaxy UGC 7636. The dwarf shows a trail of debris spanning roughly 1 × 5 arcminutes, which corresponds to a physical dimension of 6 × 30 kpc.

== Supernovae ==
Two supernovae have been observed in M49:

- SN 1969Q (type unknown, mag. 13) was discovered by Evans on 12 June 1969. (Note: Some sources incorrectly report the discovery date as 1 June 1969.)
- SN 2024kce (Type Ia-pec, mag. 17.5477) was discovered by the Zwicky Transient Facility on 2 June 2024. It was located 12.8′ from the center of M49, corresponding to a projected distance of 203 kly (62.2 kpc). High amounts of calcium in the spectra indicate that it might be a calcium-rich supernova. SN 2024kce and five other transients were still visible in June 2025 when the Vera C. Rubin Observatory imaged the area.

== See also ==
- List of Messier objects
