= Virgo Cluster =

Galaxy cluster in the constellation Virgo

- The southern portion of the Virgo Cluster as imaged by the Vera C. Rubin Observatory in very high resolution, taken on June 5, 2025. (Note: The largest galaxy visible in this image is the M49 Galaxy on the left.)

Observation data (Epoch J2000)
- Constellation(s): Virgo & Coma Berenices
- Right ascension: 12^{h} 27^{m}
- Declination: +12° 43′
- Brightest member: Messier 49
- Number of galaxies: ~1,500
- Parent structure: Virgo Supercluster
- Bautz–Morgan classification: III
- Distance: 53.8 ± 0.3 Mly (16.5 ± 0.1 Mpc)
- Binding mass: 10^{15} M_{☉}

The Virgo Cluster is a cluster of galaxies whose center is 53.8 ± 0.3 Mly (16.5 ± 0.1 Mpc) away in the constellation Virgo. Comprising approximately 1,300 (and possibly up to 2,000) member galaxies, the cluster forms the heart of the larger Virgo Supercluster, of which the Local Group (containing the Milky Way galaxy) is a member. The Local Group actually experiences the mass of the Virgo Supercluster as the Virgocentric flow. It is estimated that the Virgo Cluster's mass is 1.2×10^{15} M_{☉} out to 8 degrees of the cluster's center or a radius of about 2.2 Mpc.

Many of the brighter galaxies in this cluster, including the giant elliptical galaxy Messier 87, were discovered in the late 1770s and early 1780s and subsequently included in Charles Messier's catalogue of non-cometary fuzzy objects. Described by Messier as nebulae without stars, their true nature was not recognized until the 1920s. (Note: Following the entry for M91 in the Connoissance des Temps for 1784, Messier added the following note: The constellation of Virgo, & especially the northern Wing is one of the constellations which encloses the most Nebulae: this Catalog contains thirteen which have been determined: viz. Nos. 49, 58, 59, 60, 61, 84, 85, 86, 87, 88, 89, 90, & 91. All these nebulae appear to be without stars: one can see them only in a very good sky, & near their meridian passage. Most of these nebulae have been pointed to me by Mr. Méchain.)

The cluster extends across approximately 8 degrees centered in the constellation Virgo. Some of its most prominent members can be seen with binoculars and small telescopes, while a 6-inch telescope will reveal about 160 of the cluster's galaxies on a clear night. Its brightest member is the elliptical galaxy Messier 49.

== Characteristics ==
The cluster is a fairly heterogeneous mixture of spiral and elliptical galaxies. As of 2004, it is believed that the spiral galaxies of the cluster are distributed in an oblong prolate filament, approximately four times as long as it is wide, stretching along the line of sight from the Milky Way. The elliptical galaxies are more centrally concentrated than the spiral galaxies. The first example of an ultra-diffuse galaxy was also found in the central core of the cluster in 1984.

== Subclumps ==
The cluster is an aggregate of at least three separate subclusters or subclumps:

- Virgo A, centered on M87
- M86 subcluster, a second subclump centered on the galaxy M86
- Virgo B, centered on M49

Some authors also include:

- Virgo C subcluster, centered on the galaxy M60
- Low Velocity Cloud (LVC) subclump, centered on the large spiral galaxy NGC 4216

The giant elliptical galaxy M87 contains a supermassive black hole, whose event horizon was observed by the Event Horizon Telescope Collaboration in 2019.

Virgo A is the dominant subclump; its mass of approximately 10^{14} M_{☉} is approximately ten times larger than the other two subclumps. It contains a mixture of elliptical, lenticular, and spiral galaxies which are generally gas-poor,

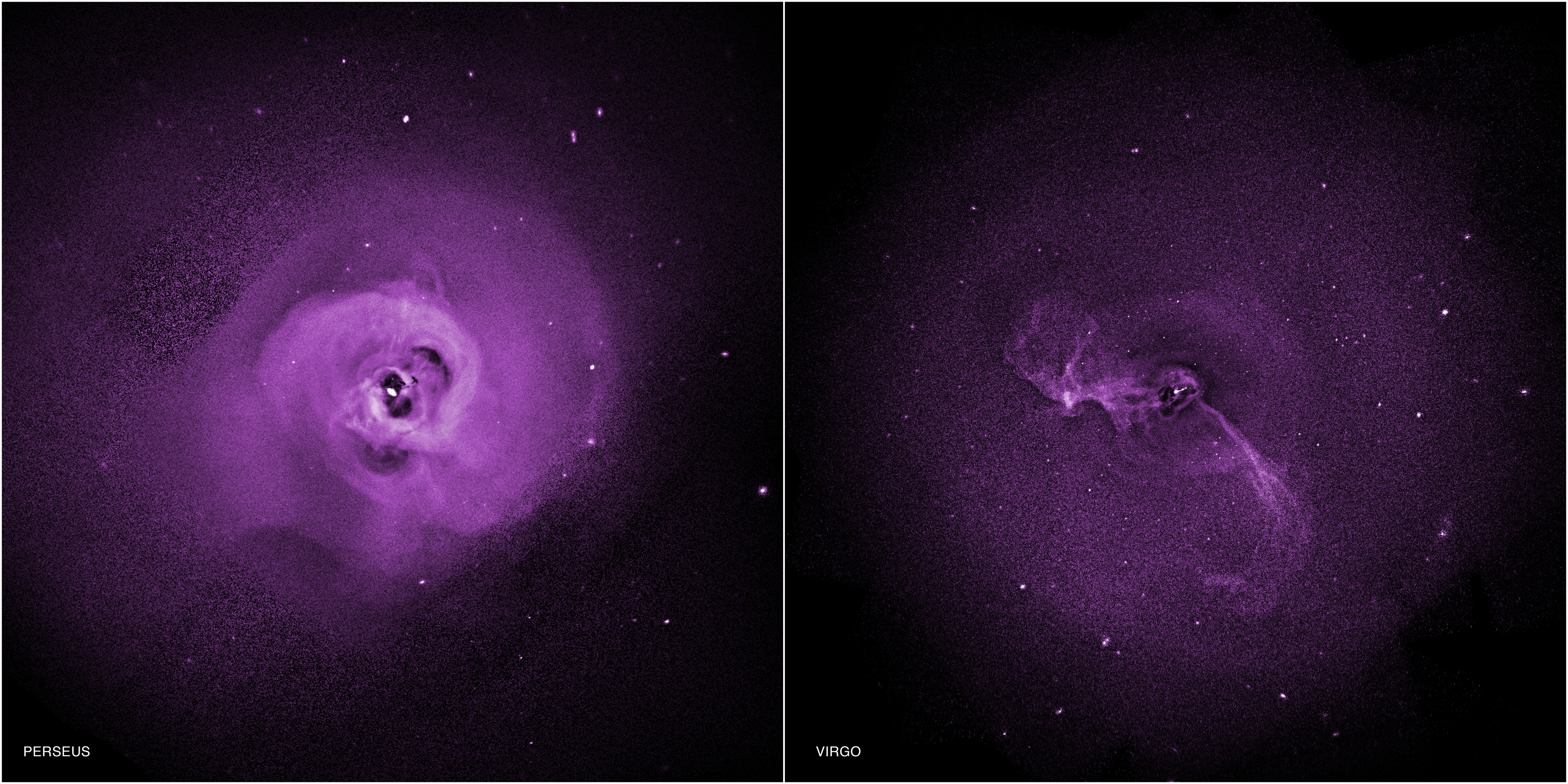
Turbulence may prevent galaxy clusters from cooling (Chandra X-ray).

The three subgroups are in the process of merging to form a larger single cluster, and are surrounded by other smaller galaxy clouds, mostly composed of spiral galaxies, known as N Cloud, S Cloud, and Virgo E that are in the process of infalling to merge with them, plus other farther isolated galaxies and galaxy groups (like the galaxy cloud Coma I) that are also attracted by the gravity of Virgo to merge with it in the future. This strongly suggests the Virgo cluster is a dynamically young cluster that is still forming.

Nearby aggregations known as M Cloud, W Cloud, and W' Cloud seem to be background systems independent of the main cluster.

=== Other characteristics ===
The large mass of the cluster is indicated by the high peculiar velocities of many of its galaxies, sometimes as high as 1,600 km/s with respect to the cluster's center.

The Virgo Cluster lies within the Virgo Supercluster, and its gravitational effect slows down the nearby galaxies. The large mass of the cluster has the effect of slowing down the recession of the Local Group from the cluster by approximately ten percent.

Many of the galaxies contained within the Virgo Cluster undergo ram pressure stripping, where pressure from the dense intracluster medium efficiently removes molecular gas from the cluster's galaxies. This gas removal can eventually lead to the quenching of star formation in these galaxies.

== Intracluster medium ==
As with many other rich galaxy clusters, Virgo's intracluster medium is filled with a hot, rarefied plasma at temperatures of 30 million kelvins that emits X-Rays. Within the intracluster medium (ICM) are found a large number of intergalactic stars (up to 10% of the stars in the cluster), including some planetary nebulae. It is theorized that these were expelled from their home galaxies by interactions with other galaxies. The ICM also contains some globular clusters, possibly stripped off dwarf galaxies, and even at least one star formation region.

== Galaxies ==
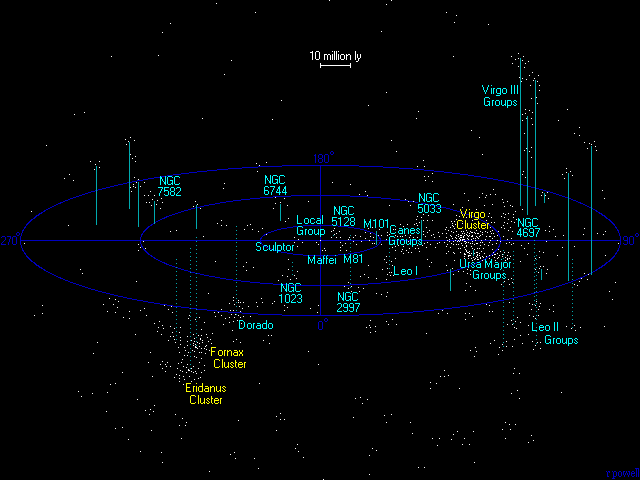
Map of the local universe centered on the Local Group (image diameter 200 Mly ≈ 60 Mpc). Most of the Virgo Supercluster, including Virgo Cluster, is visible in the center right of the image, at about 50 Mly from the Local Group.

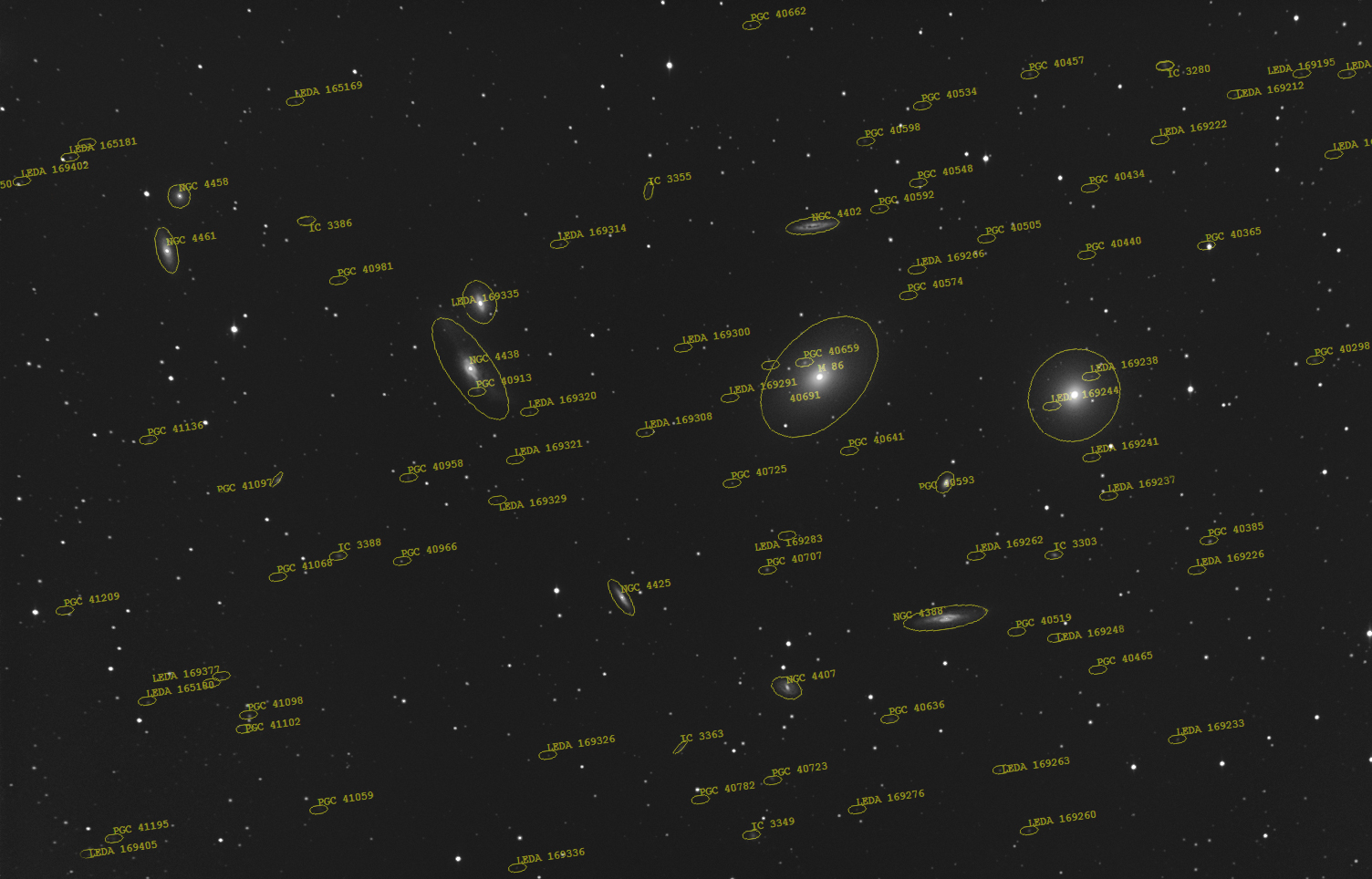
Photograph of the Virgo Cluster, a few degrees around M86, with labelled galaxies

Below is a table of bright or notable objects in the cluster and their subcluster. In some cases a galaxy may be considered to be in a different subcluster by other researchers (sources:)

Column 1: The name of the galaxy.
Column 2: The right ascension for epoch 2000.
Column 3: The declination for epoch 2000.
Column 4: The blue apparent magnitude of the galaxy.
Column 5: The galaxy type: E=Elliptical; S0=Lenticular; Sa,Sb,Sc,Sd=Spiral; SBa,SBb,SBc,SBd=Barred spiral; Sm,SBm,Irr=Irregular.
Column 6: The angular diameter of the galaxy (arcminutes).
Column 7: The diameter of the galaxy (thousands of light years).
Column 8: The recessional velocity (km/s) of the galaxy relative to the cosmic microwave background.
Column 9: Subcluster where the galaxy is located.

Cluster members
Designation	Coordinates (Epoch 2000)		Apparent magnitude (blue)	Type	Angular size	Diameter (kly)	RV (km/s)	Subcluster
Designation	RA	Dec	Apparent magnitude (blue)	Type	Angular size	Diameter (kly)	RV (km/s)	Subcluster
Messier 98	12 13.8	14 54	10.9	SBb	9.8′	150	184	Virgo A or N Cloud
NGC 4216	12 15.9	13 09	10.9	SBb	7.9′	120	459	Virgo A, N Cloud, or LVC
Messier 99	12 18.8	14 25	10.4	Sc	5.4′	80	2735	Virgo A or N Cloud
NGC 4262	12 19.5	14 53	12.4	S0	1.9′	30	1683	Virgo A
NGC 4388	12 25.5	12 39	11.8	SAb	6.2′	85	2845	Virgo A
Messier 61	12 21.9	04 28	10.2	SBbc	6.2′	100	1911	S Cloud
Messier 100	12 22.9	15 49	10.1	SBbc	7.6′	115	1899	Virgo A
Messier 84	12 25.1	12 53	10.1	E_{1}	6.0′	90	1239	Virgo A Markarian's Chain
Messier 85	12 25.4	18 11	10.0	S0	7.1′	105	1056	Virgo A
Messier 86	12 26.2	12 57	9.9	E_{3}	10.2′	155	37	Virgo A or own subgroup. Markarian's Chain
NGC 4435	12 27.7	13 05	11.7	S0	3.0′	45	1111	Virgo A
NGC 4438	12 27.8	13 01	11.0	Sa	8.7′	130	404	Virgo A
NGC 4450	12 28.5	17 05	10.9	Sab	5.1′	80	2273	Virgo A
Messier 49	12 29.8	08 00	9.3	E_{2}	9.8′	150	1204	Virgo B
Messier 87	12 30.8	12 23	9.6	E_{0–1}	9.8′	980	1204	Virgo A
Messier 88	12 32.0	14 25	10.3	Sb	6.8′	100	2599	Virgo A
NGC 4526	12 32.0	07 42	10.6	S0	7.1′	105	931	Virgo B
NGC 4527	12 34.1	02 39	12.4	Sb	4.6′	69	1730	S Cloud
NGC 4536	12 34.4	02 11	11.1	SBbc	7.2′	115	2140	S Cloud
Messier 91	12 35.4	14 30	11.0	SBb	5.2′	80	803	Virgo A
NGC 4546	12 35.5	−03 48	11.3	S0	2.3'	30	1054	S Cloud
NGC 4550	12 35.5	12 13	12.5	S0	3.2′	50	704	Virgo A
Messier 89	12 35.7	12 33	10.7	E_{0}	5.0′	75	628	Virgo A
NGC 4567	12 36.5	11 15	12.1	Sbc	2.8′	40	2588	Virgo A
NGC 4568	12 36.6	11 14	11.7	Sbc	4.4′	65	2578	Virgo A
Messier 90	12 36.8	13 10	10.2	SBab	10.5′	160	87	Virgo A
NGC 4571	12 36.9	14 13	11.9	Sc	3.7′	55	659	Virgo A
Messier 58	12 37.7	11 49	10.6	SBb	5.6′	85	1839	Virgo A
Messier 59	12 42.9	11 39	10.8	E_{5}	5.0′	75	751	Virgo A or Virgo E
Messier 60	12 43.7	11 33	9.8	E_{2}	7.2′	110	1452	Virgo A, Virgo E, or Virgo C
NGC 4651	12 43.7	16 24	11.4	Sc	4.0′	60	1113	
NGC 4654	12 43.9	13 08	11.1	SBc	5.0′	75	1349	Virgo A

Fainter galaxies within the cluster are usually known by their numbers in the Virgo Cluster Catalog, particularly members of the numerous dwarf galaxy population.

== See also ==
- Virgo III Groups
- Coma Cluster – another large, nearby cluster of galaxies
- Eridanus Cluster
- Fornax Cluster – a smaller nearby cluster of galaxies
- Norma Cluster
- List of galaxy clusters
