= List of galaxies with richest globular cluster systems =

G of richest GCl Systems

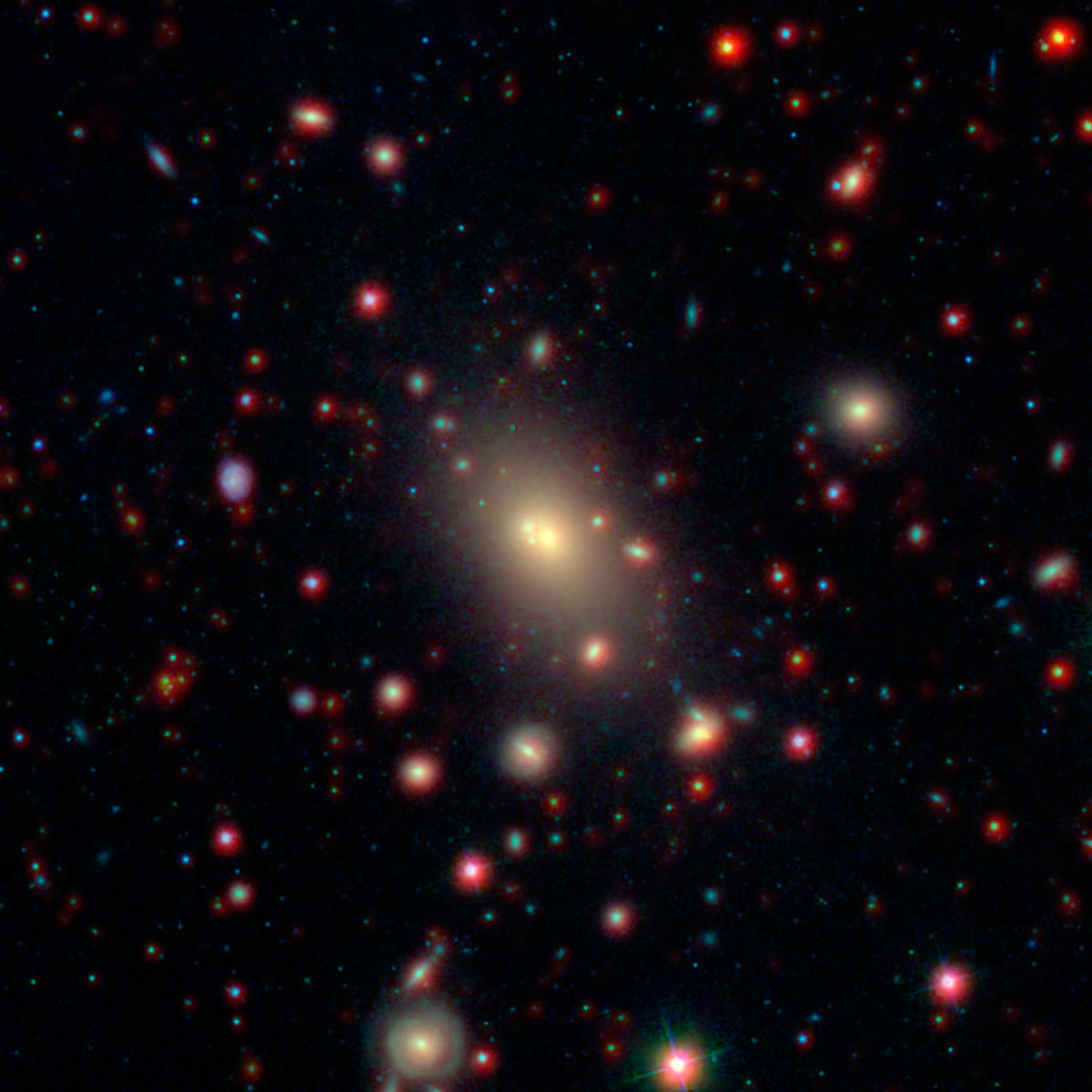
NGC 6166, galaxy with richest known globular cluster system

This is a list of galaxies with richest known globular cluster systems. As of 2019, the galaxy NGC 6166 has the richest globular cluster system, with 39 000 globular clusters. Other galaxies with rich globular cluster systems are NGC 4874, NGC 4889, NGC 3311 and Messier 87. For comparison, the Milky Way has a poor globular cluster system, with only 150-180 globular clusters.

| Galaxy | Image | Number of globular clusters | Notes |
|---|---|---|---|
| NGC 6166 | | 39 000 ± 2000 | Richest known globular cluster system |
| UGC 10143 | | 35,000 | Richest globular cluster system in Abell 2147 |
| NGC 4874 | | 18 700 ± 2260 | Richest globular cluster system in Coma Cluster |
| NGC 3311 | | 16 500 ± 2000 | Richest globular cluster system in southern part of the sky and in Hydra Cluster |
| Messier 87 | | 12 000 ± 800 | Richest globular cluster system in Virgo Supercluster and richest in Messier Catalog. Also richest within 100 million light-years. Data from 2006 survey |
| NGC 4889 | | 11 000 ± 1340 | Largest galaxy in this list (diameter is about 1050 000 light-years) |
| IC 4051 | | 6700 ± 530 | Richest globular cluster system in IC catalog |
| NGC 1395 | | 6000 ± 1100 | Richest globular cluster system in Eridanus Cluster, divided into two populations (red and blue) |
| NGC 1399 | | 6000 ± 600 | Richest globular cluster system in Fornax Cluster, most clusters are given |
| Messier 49 | | 5900 | |
| Messier 60 | | 5100 | |
| Messier 86 | | 3800 | Richest globular cluster system in Markarian's Chain |
| NGC 6861 | | 3000 ± 300 | |
| NGC 1600 | | 2850 | |
| Messier 59 | | 2200 | |
| Messier 89 | | 2000 | Data from 2006 survey |
| Messier 84 | | 1775 ± 150 | |
| Sombrero Galaxy | | 1600 ± 400 | Richest globular cluster system around named galaxy |
| Centaurus A | | 1450 ± 160 | |
| NGC 4278 | | 1378+32 −194 | |
| NGC 4926 | | 1300 ± 300 | |
| Maffei 1 | | 1100 | Closest galaxy in this list (distance is about 11 000 000 light-years) |
