= NGC 3285B =

Galaxy in the constellation Hyrda

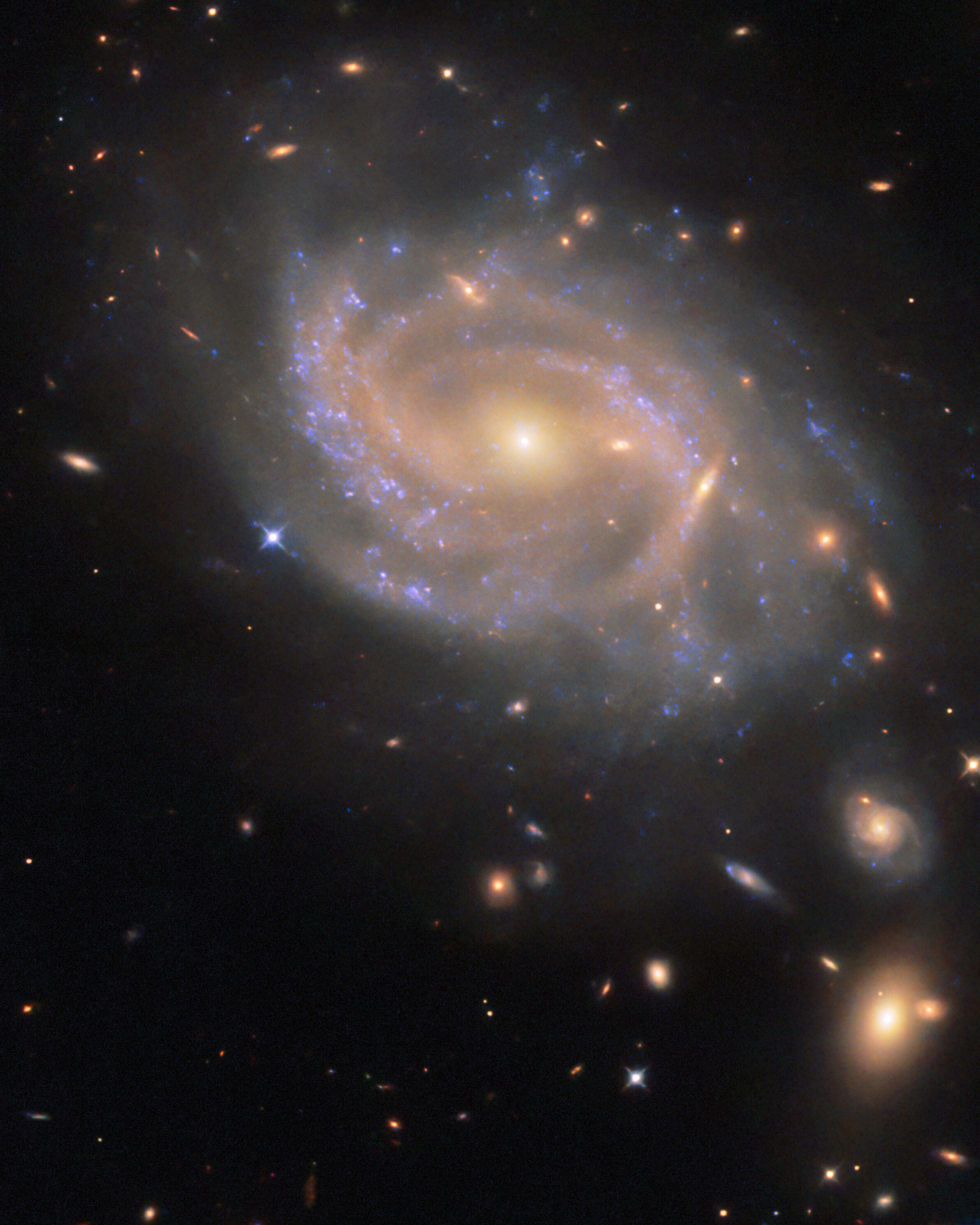
- NGC 3285B imaged by the Hubble Space Telescope. SN 2023xqm is visible as a bright blue-white star below and to the left of the galaxy's nucleus.

Observation data (J2000 epoch)
- Constellation: Hydra
- Right ascension: 10^{h} 34^{m} 36.8767^{s}
- Declination: −27° 39′ 10.468″
- Redshift: 0.009847±0.0000033
- Heliocentric radial velocity: 2,952±10 km/s
- Distance: 136.59 ± 2.83 Mly (41.880 ± 0.867 Mpc)
- Group or cluster: NGC 3312 group (LGG 210), Hydra Cluster
- Apparent magnitude (V): 13.86

Characteristics
- Type: SB(rs)b
- Size: ~100,800 ly (30.92 kpc) (estimated)
- Apparent size (V): 1.5′ × 1.1′

Other designations
- ESO 501- G 018, IRAS 10322-2723, 2MASX J10343687-2739108, MCG -04-25-022, PGC 31293

NGC 3285B is a barred spiral galaxy in the constellation of Hydra. Its velocity with respect to the cosmic microwave background is 3,295±26 km/s, which corresponds to a Hubble distance of 158.5 ± 11.2 Mly (48.60 ± 3.43 Mpc). However, five non-redshift measurements give a closer distance of 136.59 ± 2.83 Mly (41.880 ± 0.867 Mpc). The earliest known reference to this galaxy comes from the 1964 book, Reference Catalogue of Bright Galaxies, written by Antoinette de Vaucouleurs, Gérard de Vaucouleurs, and Harlow Shapley. Therefore, this galaxy, despite its common name, was not a part of the original New General Catalogue.

== NGC 3312 group and Hydra cluster ==
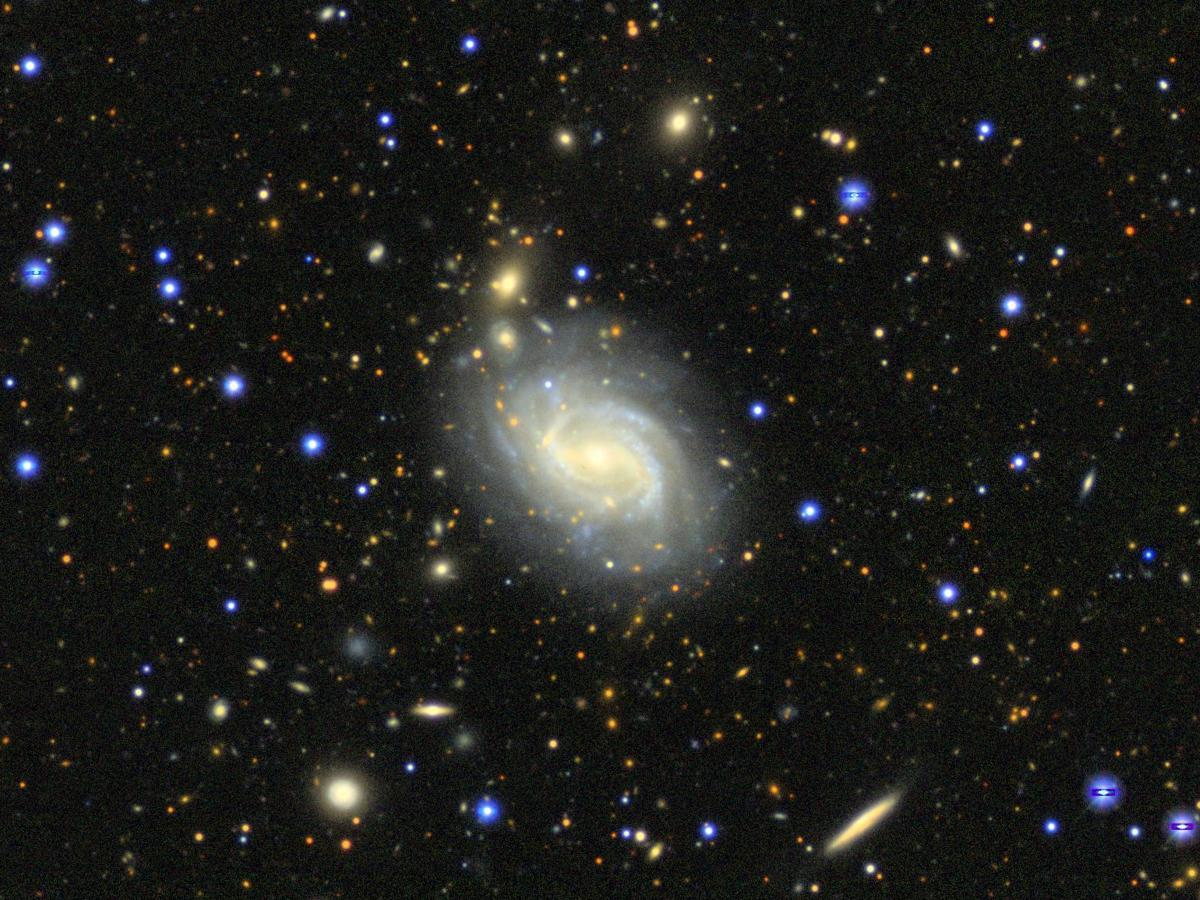
NGC 3285B imaged by Legacy Surveys

According to A. M. Garcia, NGC 3285B is part of the NGC 3312 group (also known as LGG 210). This group of galaxies has at least 11 members, including NGC 3312, NGC 3314A, IC 2597, ESO 437-15, ESO 501-68, PGC 31441, PGC 31444, PGC 31496, PGC 31515 and PGC 31580.

NGC 3285B and all galaxies in the NGC 3312 group are part of the Hydra Cluster (Abell 1060). The Hydra Cluster is the dominant cluster of the Hydra–Centaurus Supercluster.

== Supernova ==
One supernova has been observed in NGC 3285B:

- SN 2023xqm (Type Ia, mag. 17.885) was discovered by ATLAS on 13 November 2023. A detailed study of this explosion confirmed its classification as a typical Type Ia supernova.

== See also ==
- List of NGC objects (3001–4000)
