= NGC 3336 =

Galaxy in the constellation Hydra

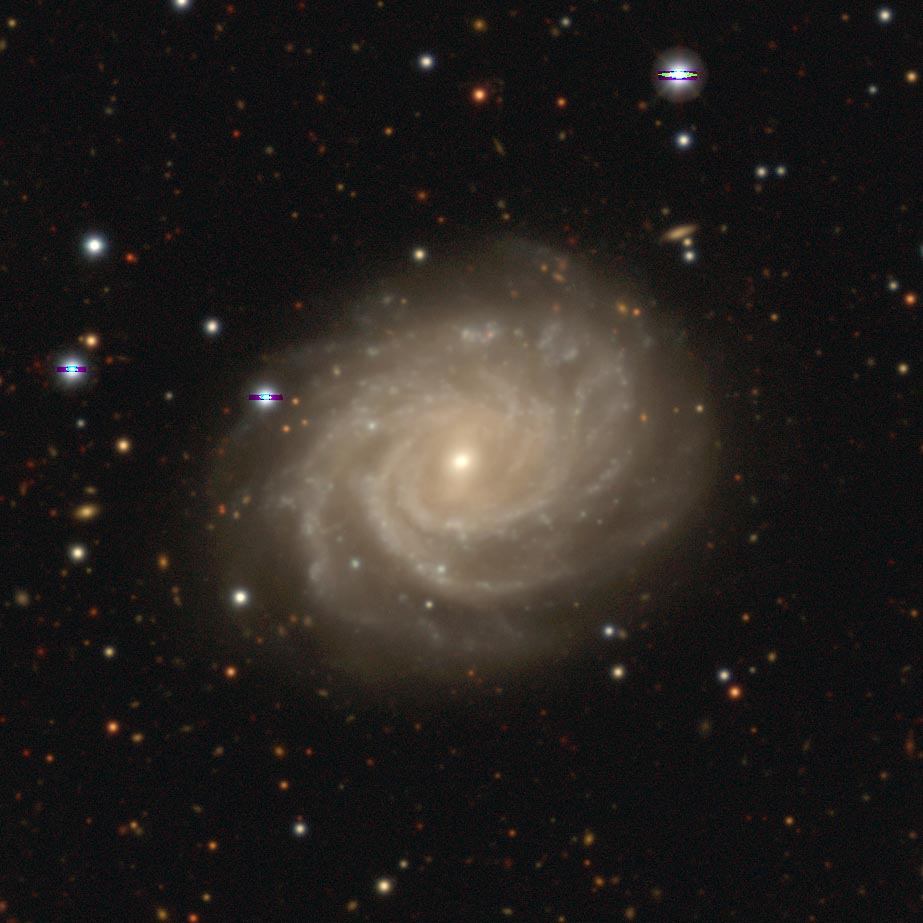
- NGC 3336 imaged by legacy surveys

Observation data (J2000 epoch)
- Constellation: Hydra
- Right ascension: 10^{h} 40^{m} 17.0^{s}
- Declination: −27° 46′ 37″
- Redshift: 0.013343
- Heliocentric radial velocity: 4000 km/s
- Distance: 193 Mly (59.3 Mpc)
- Group or cluster: Hydra Cluster
- Apparent magnitude (V): 13.00

Characteristics
- Type: SBc
- Size: ~135,000 ly (41.3 kpc) (estimated)
- Apparent size (V): 1.9 x 1.5

Other designations
- ESO 437-36, AM 1037-273, IRAS 10379-2730, MCG -05-25-036, PGC 31754

NGC 3336 is a barred spiral galaxy located about 190 million light-years away in the constellation Hydra. It was discovered by astronomer John Herschel on March 24, 1835. NGC 3336 is a member of the Hydra Cluster.

== Supernova ==
One supernova has been observed in NGC 3336: SN 1984S (type unknown, mag. 16.8) was discovered by Swiss astronomer Paul Wild on 23 December 1984.

== See also ==
- NGC 3307
- List of NGC objects (3001–4000)
