= NGC 1537 =

Galaxy in the constellation Eridanus

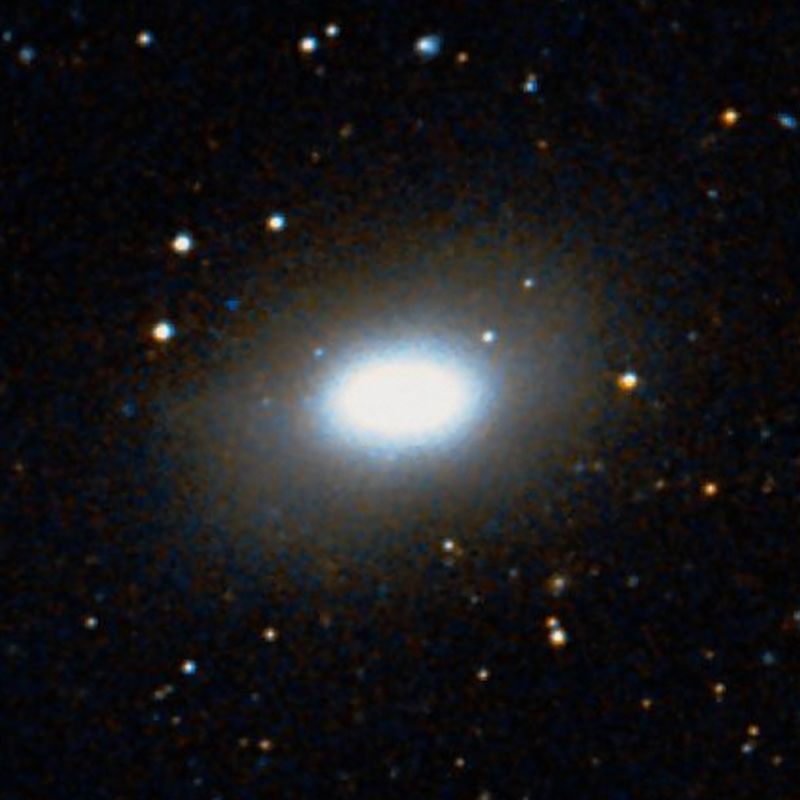
- A Sloan Digital Sky Survey (SDSS) image of NGC 1537

Observation data (J2000 epoch)
- Constellation: Eridanus
- Right ascension: 04^{h} 13^{m} 40.71^{s}
- Declination: −31° 64′ 47″
- Redshift: 0.004543±0.00007
- Distance: 64 Mly (19.6 Mpc)
- Apparent magnitude (V): 10.5

Characteristics
- Type: E3
- Size: 79,000 ly
- Apparent size (V): 3.9' x 2.6'
- Notable features: Large area of star-forming regions

Other designations
- MCG-05-11-005, ESO 420-12, PGC 14695, GSC 07037-01191

NGC 1537 is an elliptical galaxy located around 64 million light-years away in the constellation Eridanus. NGC 1537 is south of the celestial equator and it was discovered by John Herschel in 1835. NGC 1537 is not known to have much star-formation, and it is not known to have an active galactic nucleus.

== See also ==
- NGC 154, a similar elliptical galaxy
- NGC 3640, a similar elliptical galaxy with around the same size.
- NGC 3311, a supergiant elliptical galaxy
