= NGC 3315 =

Lenticular galaxy in the constellation Hydra

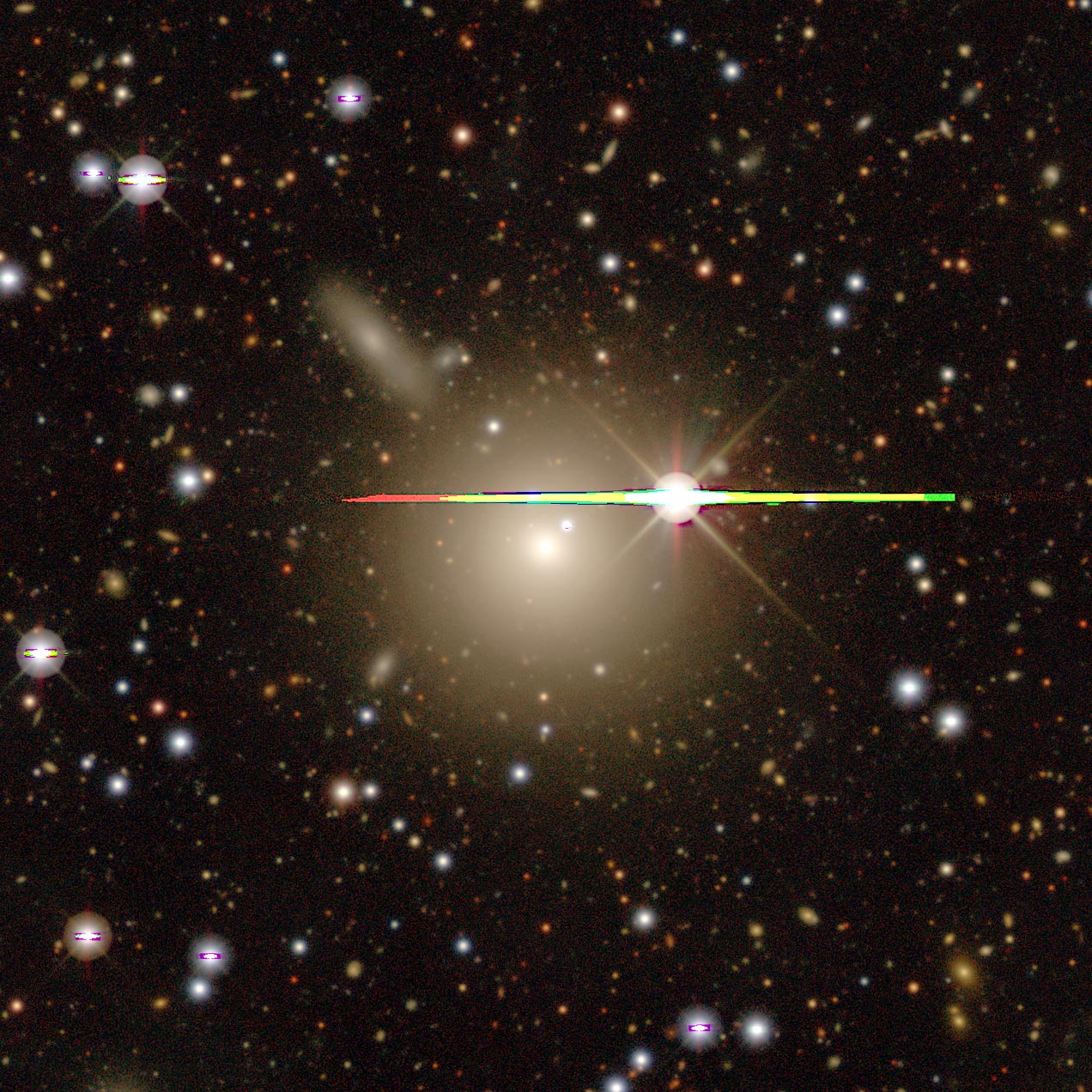
- legacy surveys image of NGC 3315

Observation data (J2000 epoch)
- Constellation: Hydra
- Right ascension: 10^{h} 37^{m} 19.2^{s}
- Declination: −27° 11′ 32″
- Redshift: 0.012655
- Heliocentric radial velocity: 3794 km/s
- Distance: 184 Mly (56.5 Mpc)
- Group or cluster: Hydra Cluster
- Apparent magnitude (V): 14.42

Characteristics
- Type: S0^-?
- Size: 106,400 ly (32.61 kpc) (estimated)
- Apparent size (V): 1.1 x 1.0

Other designations
- ESO 501-48, ESO 501-G048, MCG -4-25-42, PGC 31540

NGC 3315 is a lenticular galaxy located about 185 million light-years away in the constellation Hydra. It was discovered by astronomer Edward Austin on March 24, 1870. It is a member of the Hydra Cluster.

== See also ==
- List of NGC objects (3001–4000)
- NGC 3305
