= NGC 3308 =

Lenticular galaxy in the constellation Hydra

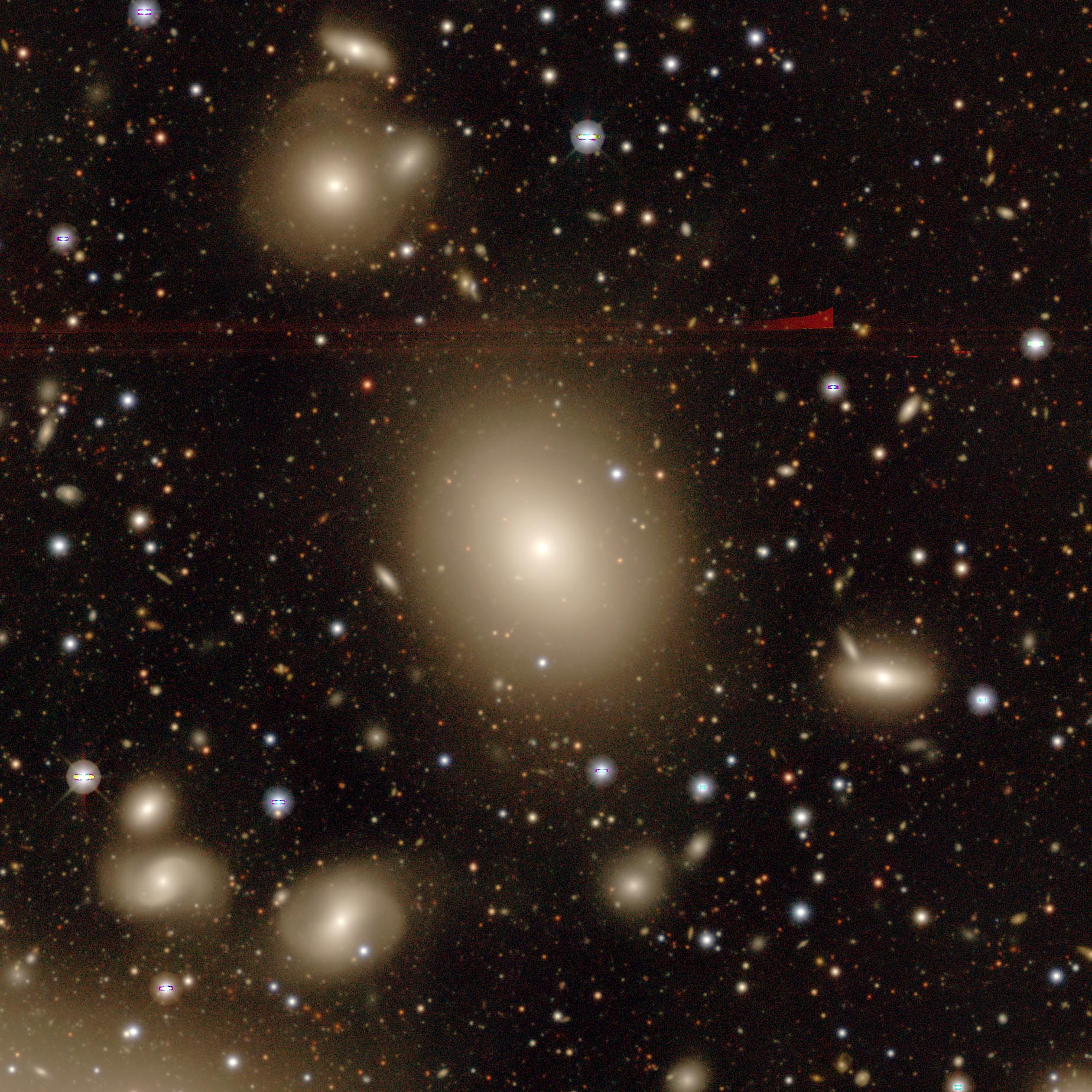
- legacy surveys image of NGC 3308

Observation data (J2000 epoch)
- Constellation: Hydra
- Right ascension: 10^{h} 36^{m} 22.4^{s}
- Declination: −27° 26′ 17″
- Redshift: 0.011855
- Heliocentric radial velocity: 3554 km/s
- Distance: 174 Mly (53.3 Mpc)
- Group or cluster: Hydra Cluster
- Apparent magnitude (V): 12.94

Characteristics
- Type: SAB0-(s)?
- Size: ~108,100 ly (33.15 kpc) (estimated)
- Apparent size (V): 1.7 x 1.3

Other designations
- ESO 501-34, MCG -4-25-32, PGC 31438

NGC 3308 is a lenticular galaxy with a faint bar located about 174 million light-years away in the constellation Hydra. NGC 3308 was discovered by astronomer John Herschel on March 24, 1835. It is a member of the Hydra Cluster.

== See also ==
- List of NGC objects (3001–4000)
- M85
