= NGC 3313 =

Galaxy in the constellation Hydra

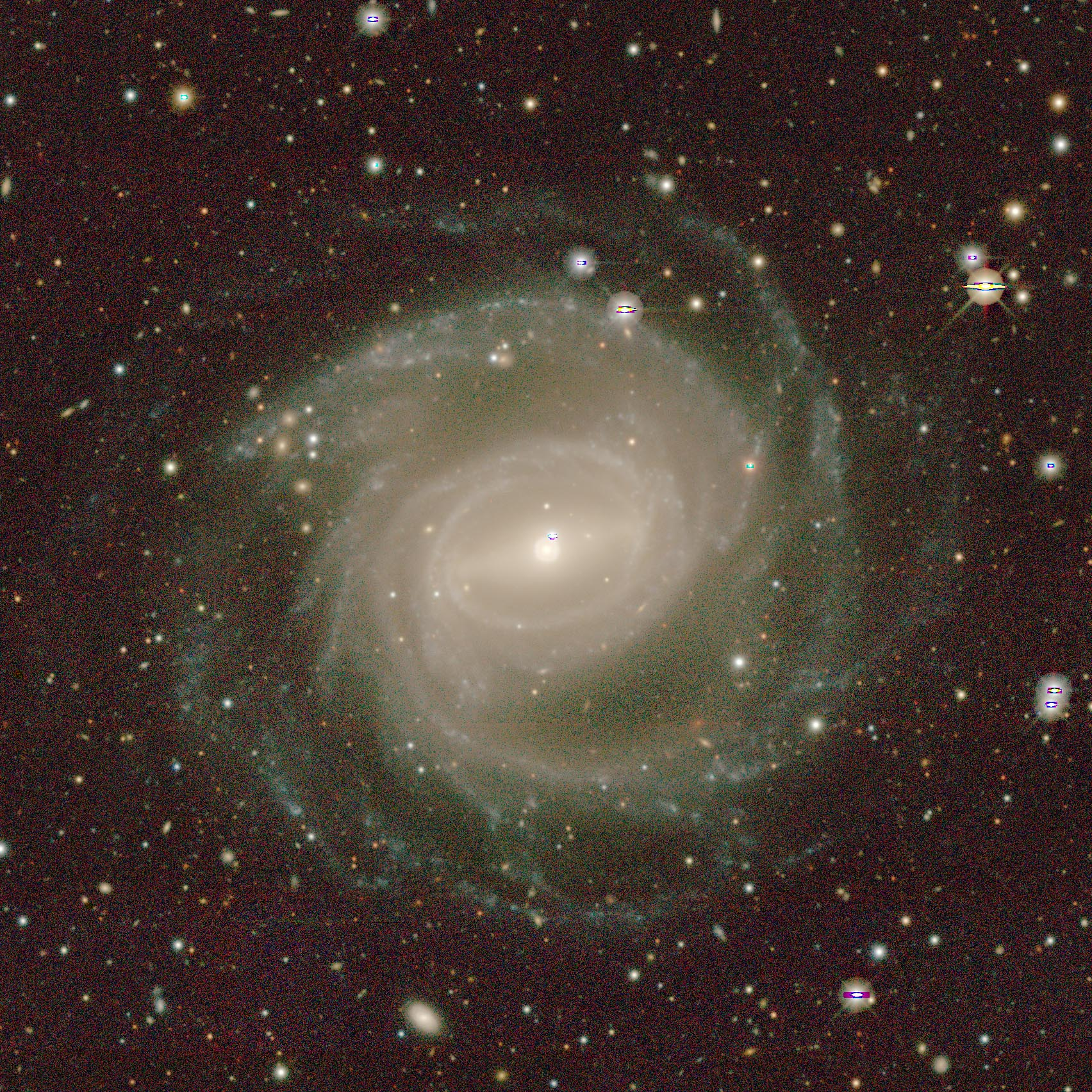
- legacy surveys image of NGC 3313

Observation data (J2000 epoch)
- Constellation: Hydra
- Right ascension: 10^{h} 37^{m} 25.4410^{s}
- Declination: −25° 19′ 08.875″
- Redshift: 0.012362
- Heliocentric radial velocity: 3706 km/s
- Distance: 59.80 ± 4.20 Mpc (195.0 ± 13.7 Mly)
- Group or cluster: NGC 3313 Group (LGG 209), Hydra Cluster
- Apparent magnitude (V): 12.38

Characteristics
- Type: (R')SB(rs)ab
- Size: ~119.53 kpc (389,900 ly) (estimated)
- Apparent size (V): 3.9 × 3.2

Other designations
- ESO 501-50, AM 1035-250, IRAS 10350-2503, UGCA 213, MCG -4-25-44, PGC 31551

NGC 3313 is a large barred spiral galaxy located about 55 megaparsecs (180 million light-years) away in the constellation Hydra. It was discovered by astronomer Ormond Stone in 1886 and is an outlying member of the Hydra Cluster.

== Physical characteristics ==
NGC 3313 has a complete inner ring feature that is elongated along the bar axis of the galaxy. Inside the inner ring, there are two weak dust lanes in the bar, and surrounding the nucleus there is a very circular nuclear ring. Spiral structure breaking off from the ring region has a complex structure and is tightly wrapped around the ring. The arms trail out into the outer disk where they form a well-defined two-armed pattern. The two-armed pattern also appears to take the form of an R1' outer pseudoring. Beyond this two-armed pattern, there are numerous spiral segments which extend to much larger distances.

== NGC 3313 group ==
NGC 3313 is the brightest and largest galaxy in a group of galaxies that bears its name. The NGC 3313 group (also known as LGG 209) includes at least 6 other galaxies: NGC 3331, NGC 3335, IC 2589, IC 2594, ESO 501-1 and ESO 501-62.

== Supernova ==
One supernova has been observed in NGC 3313:

- SN 2002jp (Type Ic, mag. 16.9) was discovered by LOTOSS (Lick Observatory and Tenagra Observatory Supernova Searches) on 23 November 2002. A precovery image was also taken by Berto Monard on 12 November 2022.

== See also ==
- List of NGC objects (3001–4000)
- NGC 1433
- NGC 1097
