= 2MASX J00482185−2507365 occulting pair =

Pair of overlapping galaxies in the constellation Sculptor

2MASX J00482185-2507365
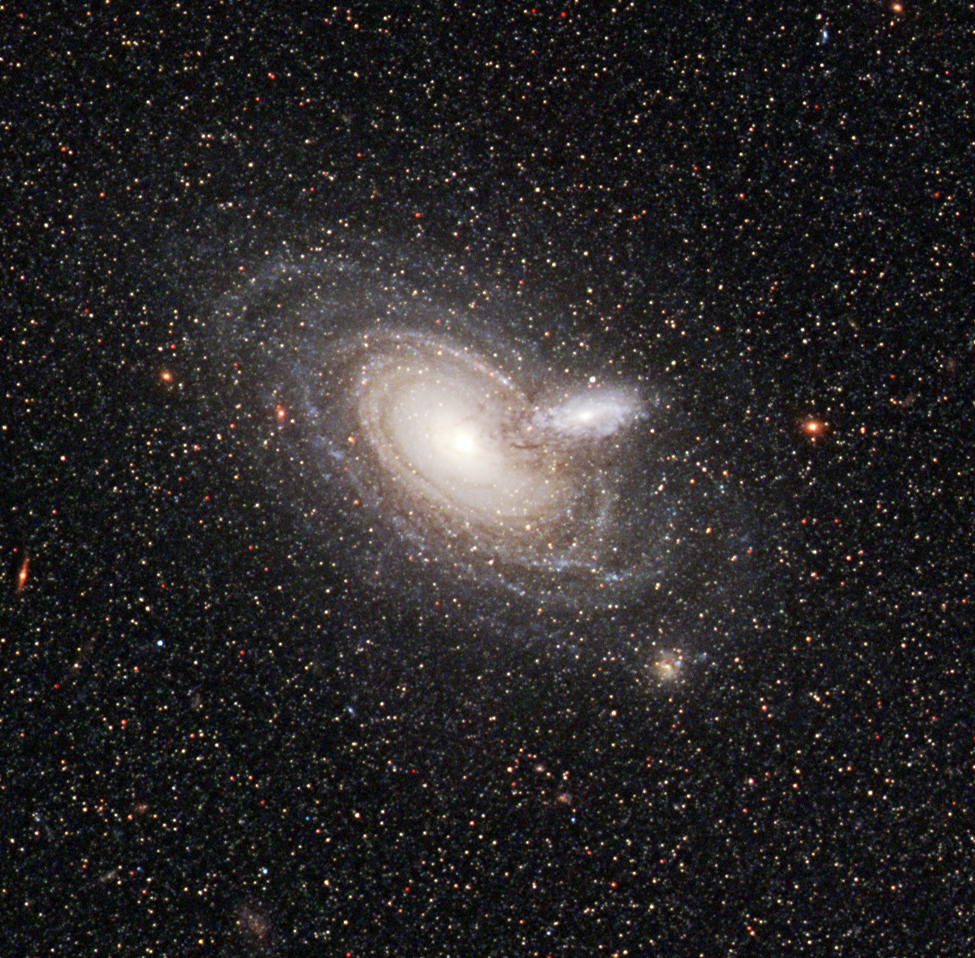
- The pair as photographed by the Hubble Space Telescope

Observation data (J2000 epoch)
- Constellation: Sculptor
- Right ascension: 00^{h} 48^{m} 21.859^{s}
- Declination: −25° 07′ 36.53″
- Redshift: 0.064011
- Heliocentric radial velocity: 19,190 km/s
- Apparent magnitude (V): 16.5

Characteristics
- Apparent size (V): 0.447′ × 0.286′

Other designations
- 2MASX J00482185–2507365, PGC 198197, 6dFGS gJ004821.8–250737, Gaia DR2 2345533837084149888

The 2MASX J00482185−2507365 occulting pair is a pair of overlapping spiral galaxies found in the vicinity of NGC 253, the Sculptor Galaxy. Both galaxies are more distant than NGC 253, with the background galaxy, 2MASX J00482185−2507365 (PGC 198197), lying at redshift z=0.06, about 800 million light-years from Earth, and the foreground galaxy lying between NGC 253 and the background galaxy (0.0008 < z < 0.06).

This pair of galaxies illuminates the distribution of galactic dust beyond the visible arms of a spiral galaxy. The heretofore unexpected extent of dust beyond the starry limits of the arms shows new areas for extragalactic astronomical study. The dusty arms extend six times the radii of the starry arms of the galaxy, and are shown silhouetted in HST images against the central and core sections of the background galaxy.

== See also ==
- AM 1316-241
- NGC 3314
