= NGC 3393 =

Galaxy in the constellation Hydra

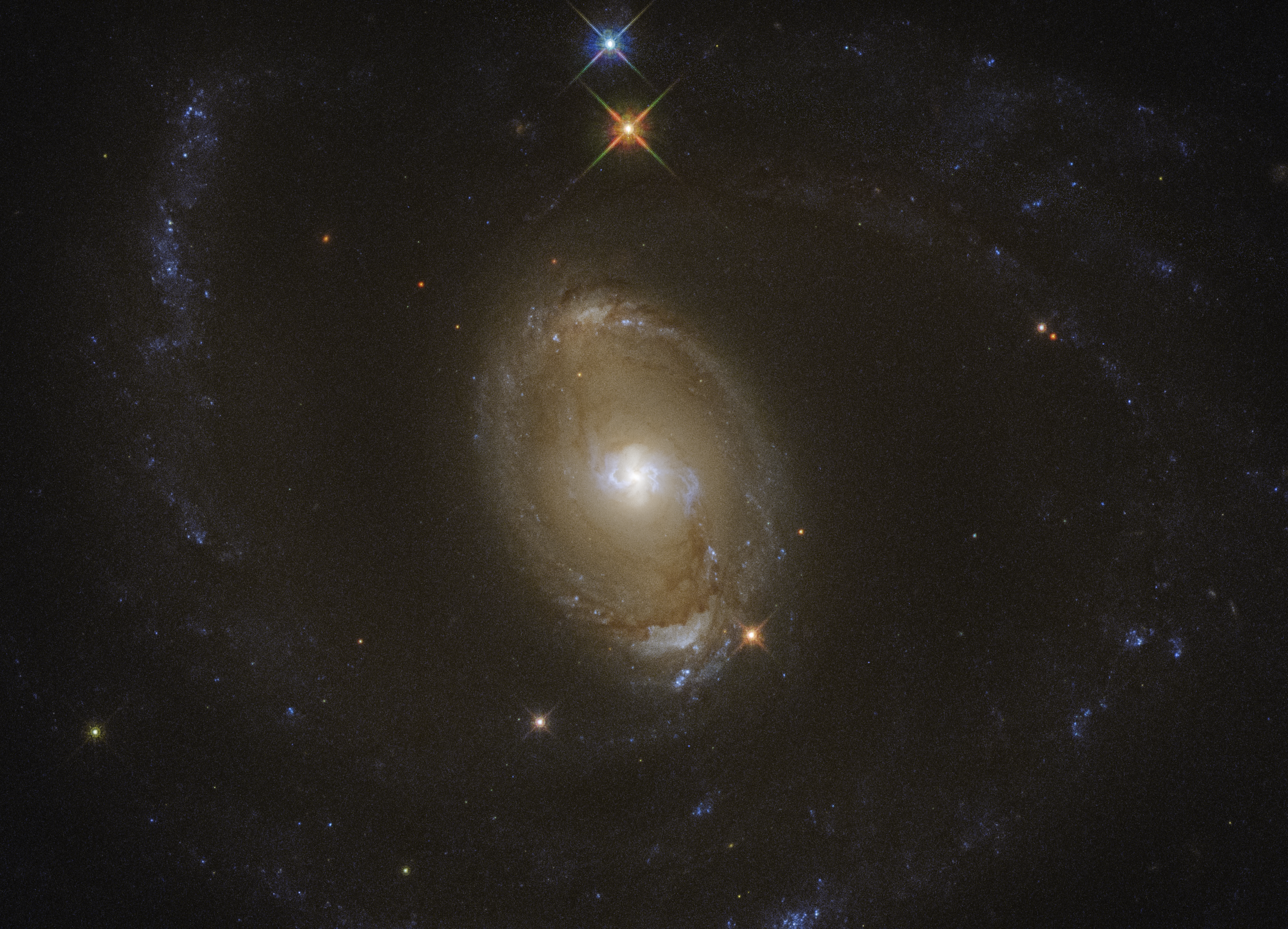
- NGC 3393 by Hubble Space Telescope

Observation data (J2000 epoch)
- Constellation: Hydra
- Right ascension: 10^{h} 48^{m} 23.5^{s}
- Declination: −25° 09′ 43″
- Redshift: 0.012509 ± 0.000017
- Heliocentric radial velocity: 3,750 ± 5 km/s
- Distance: 181 Mly (56 Mpc)
- Apparent magnitude (V): 13.1

Characteristics
- Type: (R')SB(s)ab
- Size: 70.92 kiloparsecs (231,200 light-years) (diameter; 25.0 mag/arcsec^{2} B-band isophote)
- Apparent size (V): 2.2′ × 2.0′
- Notable features: Seyfert galaxy Hosts a pair of supermassive black holes

Other designations
- ESO 501-G100, MCG -04-26-011, AM 1045-245, PGC 32300

NGC 3393 is a barred spiral galaxy located in the constellation Hydra. It is located at a distance of circa 180 million light-years from Earth, which, given its apparent dimensions, means that NGC 3393 is about 231,000 light-years across. It was discovered by John Herschel on March 24, 1835. It is a Type II Seyfert galaxy, known to host two supermassive black holes, which are the nearest known pair of supermassive black holes to Earth.

== Characteristics ==
The galaxy is characterised as a barred spiral galaxy. At both ends of the bar H II regions are present. There is also evidence of a fainter inner bar. The fainter outer arms of the galaxy form a nearly complete ring.

=== Active galactic nucleus ===
NGC 3393 has been characterised as a Seyfert galaxy, a galaxy category which features bright point-like nuclei. NGC 3393 is a type II Seyfert galaxy. Its X-ray spectrum is more consistent with a Compton-thick cold reflection source, which means that the source is hidden behind dense material, mainly gas and dust, and the X-rays observed have been reflected.

=== Supermassive black holes ===
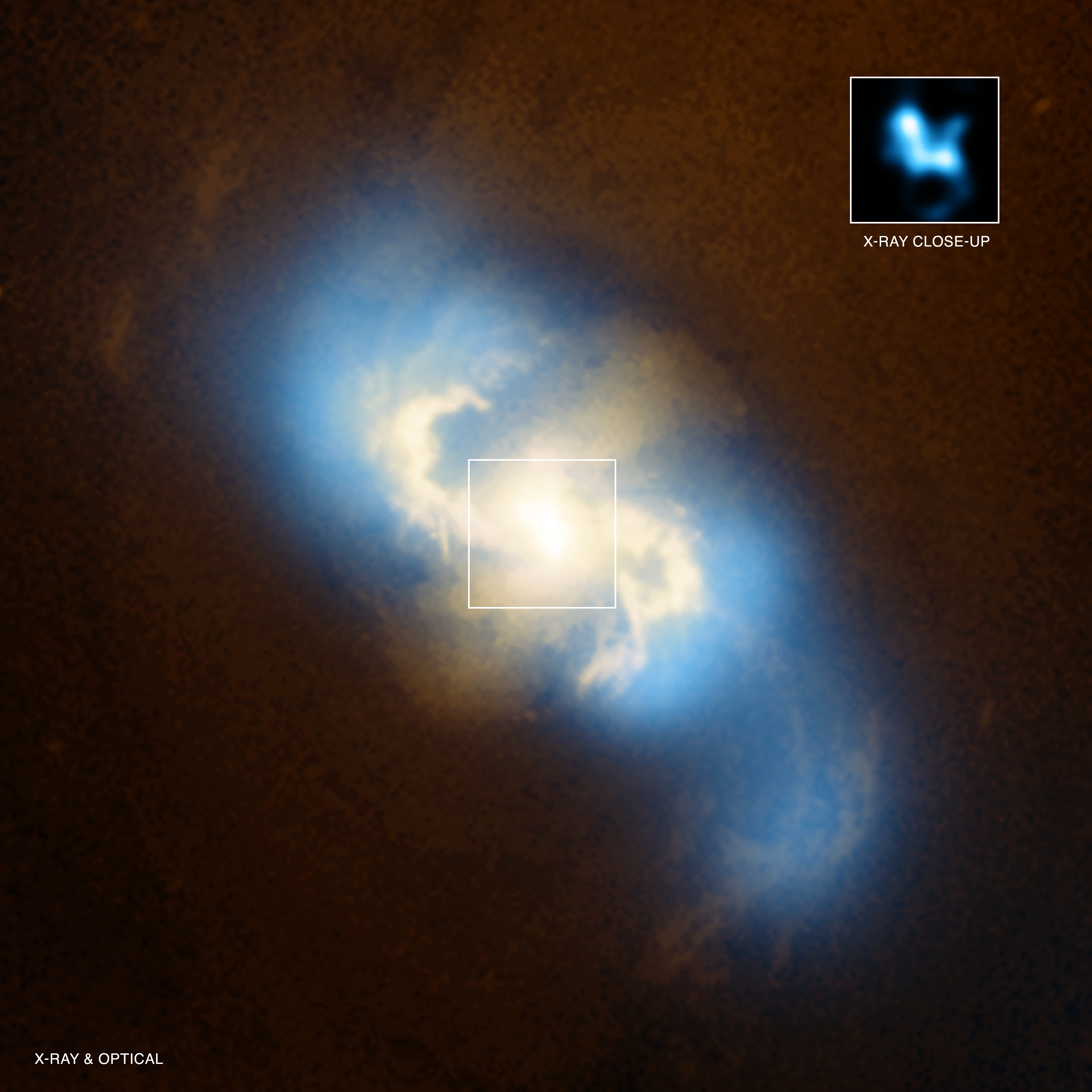
X-ray observations from the Chandra and Hubble telescopes of the supermassive black hole (SMBH) pair. The image on the top right is observations just made by Chandra.

The source of activity in the active galactic nuclei is a supermassive black hole (SMBH) lying at the centre of the galaxy. Observations by the Chandra X-ray Observatory revealed evidence for a pair of supermassive black holes in the centre of NGC 3393. The observation in hard X-rays, including emission from iron, showed two separate peaks, which were identified as black holes that are actively growing, generating X-ray emission as gas falls towards the black holes and becomes hotter. The obscured regions around both black holes block the copious amounts of optical and ultraviolet light produced by infalling material. They are the first pair of black holes found in a spiral galaxy like our Milky Way. The two black holes are separated by only 490 light years.

The two black holes in NGC 3393 are likely the remnant of a merger of two galaxies of unequal mass a billion or more years ago. Other evidence that supports the hypothesis of the galaxy merger include high pre-shock densities in the narrow-line region and low O/H and Mg/H abundances. However the N/H is more than predicted, probably due to the creation of Wolf–Rayet stars in the central region of the galaxy during the merger.

The total mass of the pair is estimated to be between 21 and 35 million M_{☉}.

== Supernova ==
One supernova has been observed in NGC 3393.

- SN 2018aqi was discovered by ASAS-SN on April 6, 2018, and had an apparent magnitude of 16.4 at discovery. By its spectrum, it was identified as a Type Ia supernova 6 days before maximum brightness.

== Nearby galaxies ==
NGC 3393 is the brightest galaxy in the NGC 3393 group, which also includes NGC 3369, NGC 3383, and ESO 501-086. NGC 3463 has also been proposed to be a member of the group. The group is part of the Hydra Supercluster.
