= NGC 3312 =

Galaxy in the constellation Hydra

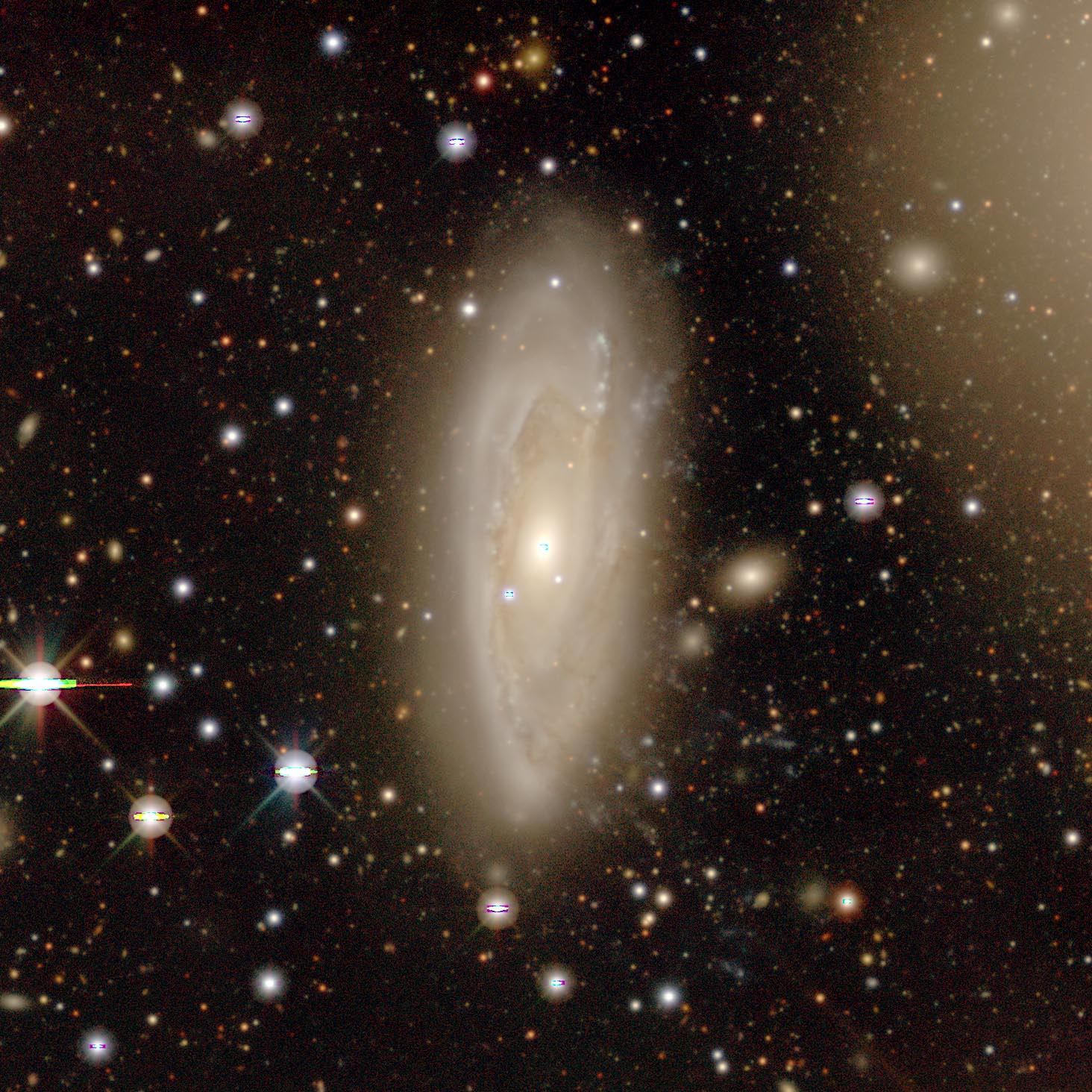
- legacy surveys image of NGC 3312

Observation data (J2000 epoch)
- Constellation: Hydra
- Right ascension: 10^{h} 37^{m} 02.5^{s}
- Declination: −27° 33′ 54″
- Redshift: 0.009627
- Heliocentric radial velocity: 2886 km/s
- Distance: 194 Mly (59.4 Mpc)
- Group or cluster: Hydra Cluster
- Apparent magnitude (V): 12.68

Characteristics
- Type: SA(s)b pec?, Jellyfish, LINER
- Size: 235,000 ly (72.12 kpc) (estimated)
- Apparent size (V): 3.3 x 1.3

Other designations
- IC 629, ESO 501-43, AM 1034-271, IRAS 10346-2718, MCG -4-25-39, PGC 31513

NGC 3312 is a large and highly inclined spiral galaxy located about 194 million light-years away in the constellation Hydra. The galaxy was discovered by astronomer John Herschel on March 26, 1835. It was later rediscovered by astronomer Guillaume Bigourdan on February 26, 1887. NGC 3312 was later listed and equated with IC 629 because the two objects share essentially the same celestial coordinates. NGC 3312 is the largest spiral galaxy in the Hydra Cluster and is also classified as a LINER galaxy.

== Physical characteristics ==
NGC 3312 appears to be highly distorted with sharp dust lanes. There are sharp filamentary extensions to the north and an internal ringlike structure in the galaxy. The interstellar matter in the galaxy also appears highly disturbed. These features caused astronomer De Vaucouleurs to suggest that NGC 3312 was distorted by the giant elliptical galaxies NGC 3309 and NGC 3311 which are the dominant ellipticals in the Hydra Cluster. However, NGC 3309 and NGC 3311 are too distant and their relative velocity differences too large for either elliptical to cause the filamentary extensions observed in NGC 3312. It is more likely that NGC 3312 is interacting with the intracluster medium causing ram-pressure stripping which is stripping the interstellar medium of the galaxy. This may have caused the filamentary extensions observed in NGC 3312 as evidenced by the location of the galaxy near the cluster core. As a result, this galaxy can be considered part of a rare class of galaxies, known as jellyfish galaxies.

== Star formation ==
Although NGC 3312's morphological structure resembles that of anemic galaxies, its mean surface-brightness profile hints that star formation may be quite active. The northwest filamentary extension from NGC 3312 has high surface brightness and has the knotted texture characteristic of active star-forming regions in spiral arms. Also, the internal dust lane of NGC 3312 is ringed with bright condensations.

== Radio source ==
NGC 3312 contains an unresolved strong radio source in its core with a strength of 27 mJy and radio emission in the disk with a strength of 24 mJy mostly being confined to the spiral arms of the galaxy or regions of star formation.

== See also ==
- List of NGC objects (3001–4000)
- Messier 90
- NGC 4921
