= NGC 3369 =

Lenticular galaxy in the constellation Hydra

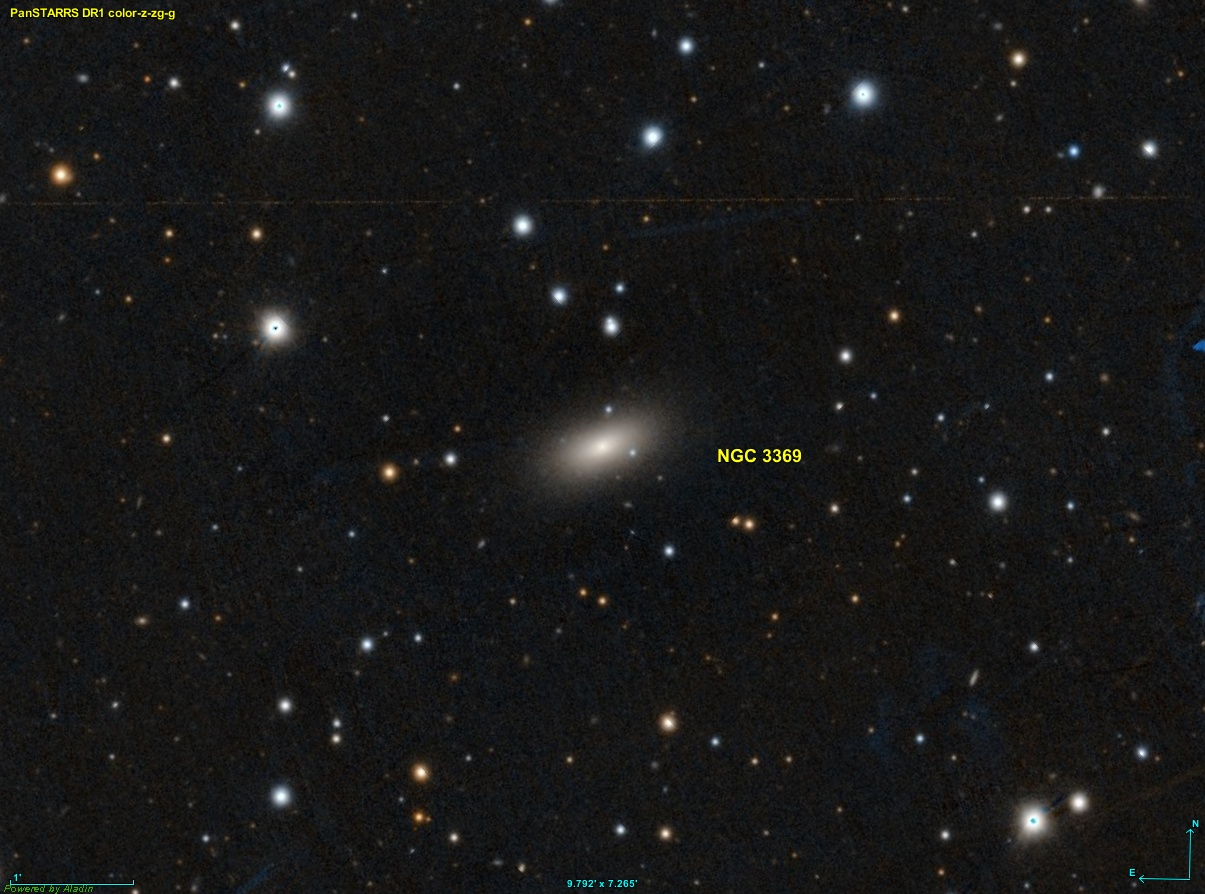
- Pan-STARRS image of NGC 3369

Observation data (J2000 epoch)
- Constellation: Hydra
- Right ascension: 10^{h} 46^{m} 44.6^{s}
- Declination: −25° 14′ 40″
- Redshift: 0.011965
- Heliocentric radial velocity: 3587 km/s
- Distance: 175 Mly (53.8 Mpc)
- Group or cluster: Hydra Cluster
- Apparent magnitude (V): 14.60

Characteristics
- Type: SA0-?
- Size: ~75,200 ly (23.07 kpc) (estimated)
- Apparent size (V): 1.4 x 0.8

Other designations
- ESO 501-95, MCG -4-26-9, PGC 32191

NGC 3369 is a lenticular galaxy located about 175 million light-years away in the constellation Hydra. NGC 3369 was discovered by astronomer Ormond Stone in 1886 and is an outlying member of the Hydra Cluster.

== See also ==
- List of NGC objects (3001–4000)
