= NGC 3305 =

Galaxy in the constellation Hydra

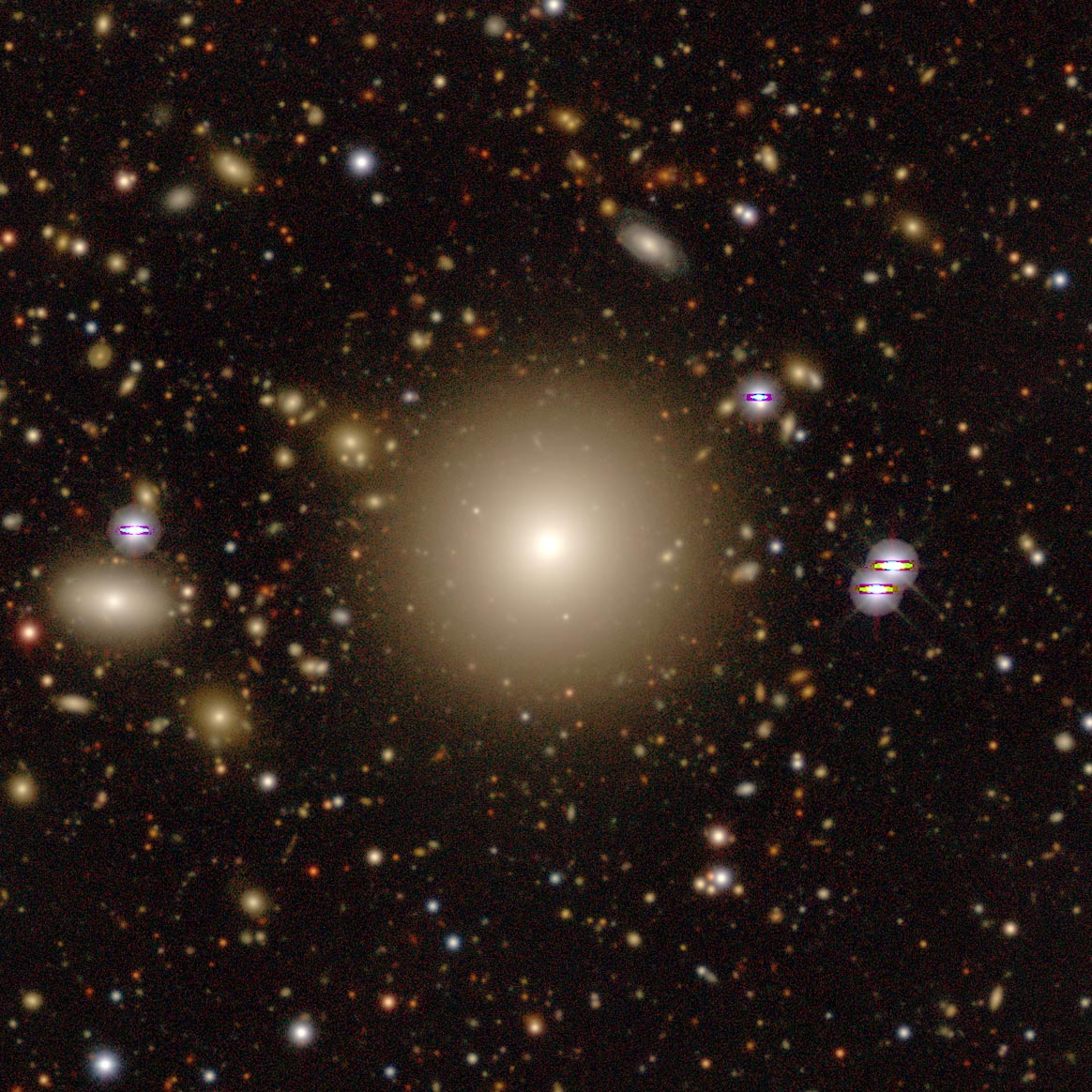
- legacy surveys image of NGC 3305

Observation data (J2000 epoch)
- Constellation: Hydra
- Right ascension: 10^{h} 36^{m} 11.7^{s}
- Declination: −27° 09′ 44″
- Redshift: 0.013099
- Heliocentric radial velocity: 3927 km/s
- Distance: 190 Mly (58.3 Mpc)
- Group or cluster: Hydra Cluster
- Apparent magnitude (V): 13.77

Characteristics
- Type: E0
- Size: ~70,900 ly (21.74 kpc) (estimated)
- Apparent size (V): 1.1 x 1.1

Other designations
- ESO 501-30, MCG -4-25-31, PGC 31421

NGC 3305 is an elliptical galaxy located about 190 million light-years away in the constellation Hydra. The galaxy was discovered by astronomer John Herschel on March 24, 1835. NGC 3305 is a member of the Hydra Cluster.

== See also ==
- List of NGC objects (3001–4000)
