= NGC 3463 =

Spiral galaxy

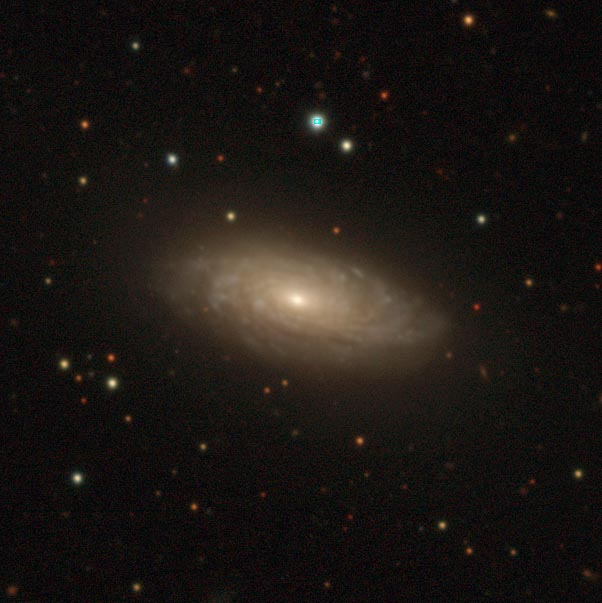

Observation data
- Constellation: Hydra
- Right ascension: 10^{h} 56^{m} 27^{s}
- Declination: −26° 16′ 44″
- Distance: 63,400,000 LY
- Apparent magnitude (V): 13.78

Characteristics
- Apparent size (V): 1.50' x 0.7'

NGC 3463 is a unbarred spiral galaxy in the constellation Hydra. It is classified as a type SAb galaxy. It was discovered on the 26th of March, 1835, by John Herschel. He described it as "faint, small, round, gradually a little brighter middle".

NGC 3463 is proposed member of the NGC 3393 Group.
