= NGC 3383 =

Spiral galaxy

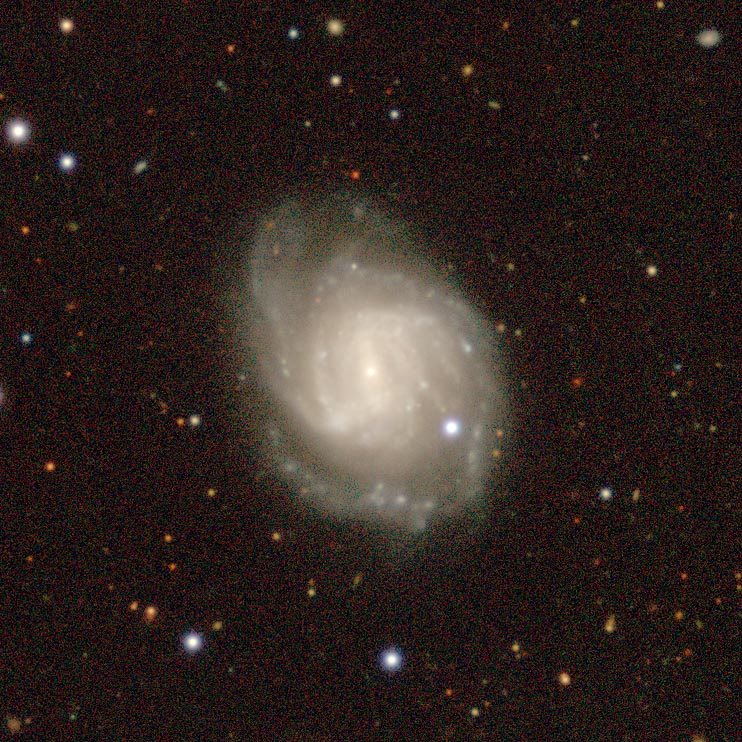
- NGC 3383 imaged by Legacy Surveys

Observation data
- Constellation: Hydra
- Right ascension: 10^{h} 47^{m} 19^{s}
- Declination: −24° 26′ 15″
- Apparent magnitude (V): 13.6

Characteristics
- Apparent size (V): 1.412′ x 1.202′

Other designations
- GC 2206, h 3297

NGC 3383 is a barred spiral galaxy in the constellation Hydra. It was discovered by John Herschel. NGC 3383 is member of the NGC 3393 Group.

One supernova has been observed in NGC 3383: SN 2022ydu (Type II, mag. 17.861) was discovered by ATLAS on 20 October 2022.
