= NGC 3307 =

Lenticular galaxy in the constellation Hydra

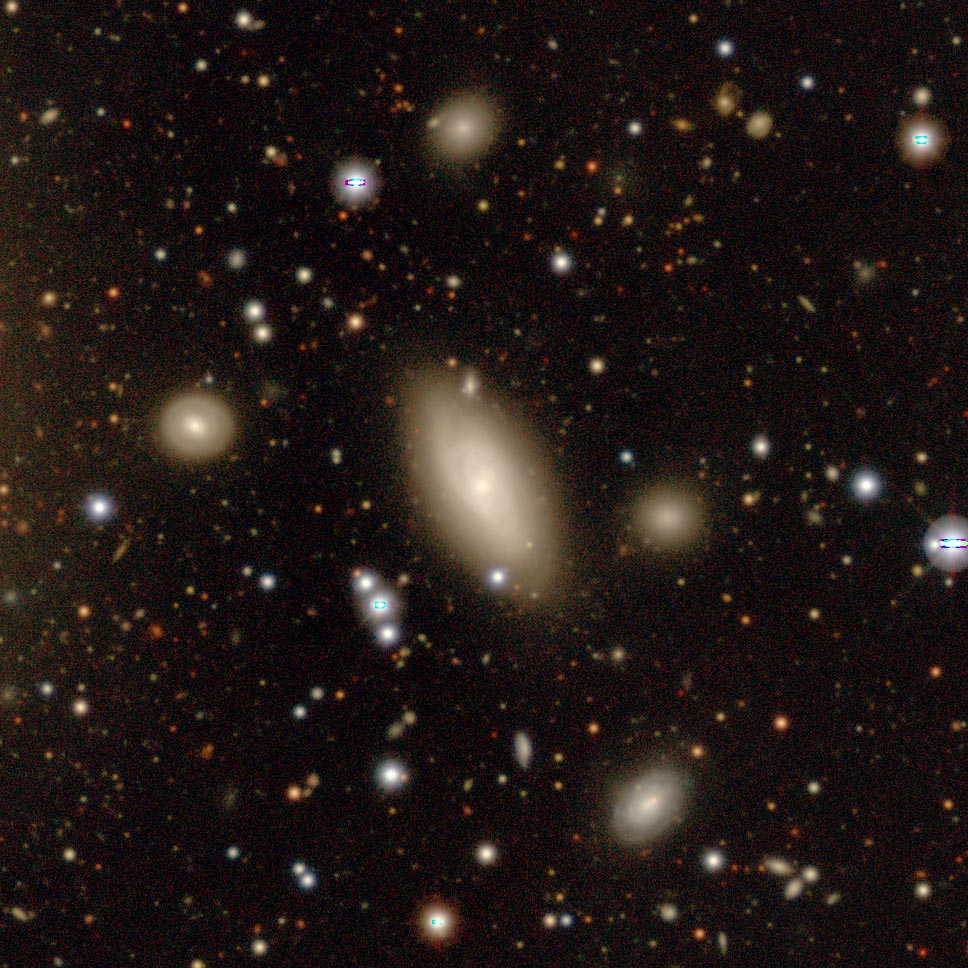
- legacy surveys image of NGC 3307

Observation data (J2000 epoch)
- Constellation: Hydra
- Right ascension: 10^{h} 36^{m} 17.2^{s}
- Declination: −27° 31′ 47″
- Redshift: 0.012612
- Heliocentric radial velocity: 3781 km/s
- Distance: 184 Mly (56.3 Mpc)
- Group or cluster: Hydra Cluster
- Apparent magnitude (V): 14.49

Characteristics
- Type: SB(r)0/a pec?
- Size: ~55,800 ly (17.11 kpc) (estimated)
- Apparent size (V): 0.9 x 0.3

Other designations
- ESO 501-31, MCG -4-25-29, PGC 31430

NGC 3307 is a lenticular galaxy located about 185 million light-years away in the constellation Hydra. The galaxy was discovered by astronomer John Herschel on March 22, 1836 and is a member of the Hydra Cluster.

== See also ==
- List of NGC objects (3001–4000)
