= AM 1316−241 =

Pair of overlapping galaxies in the constellation of Hydra

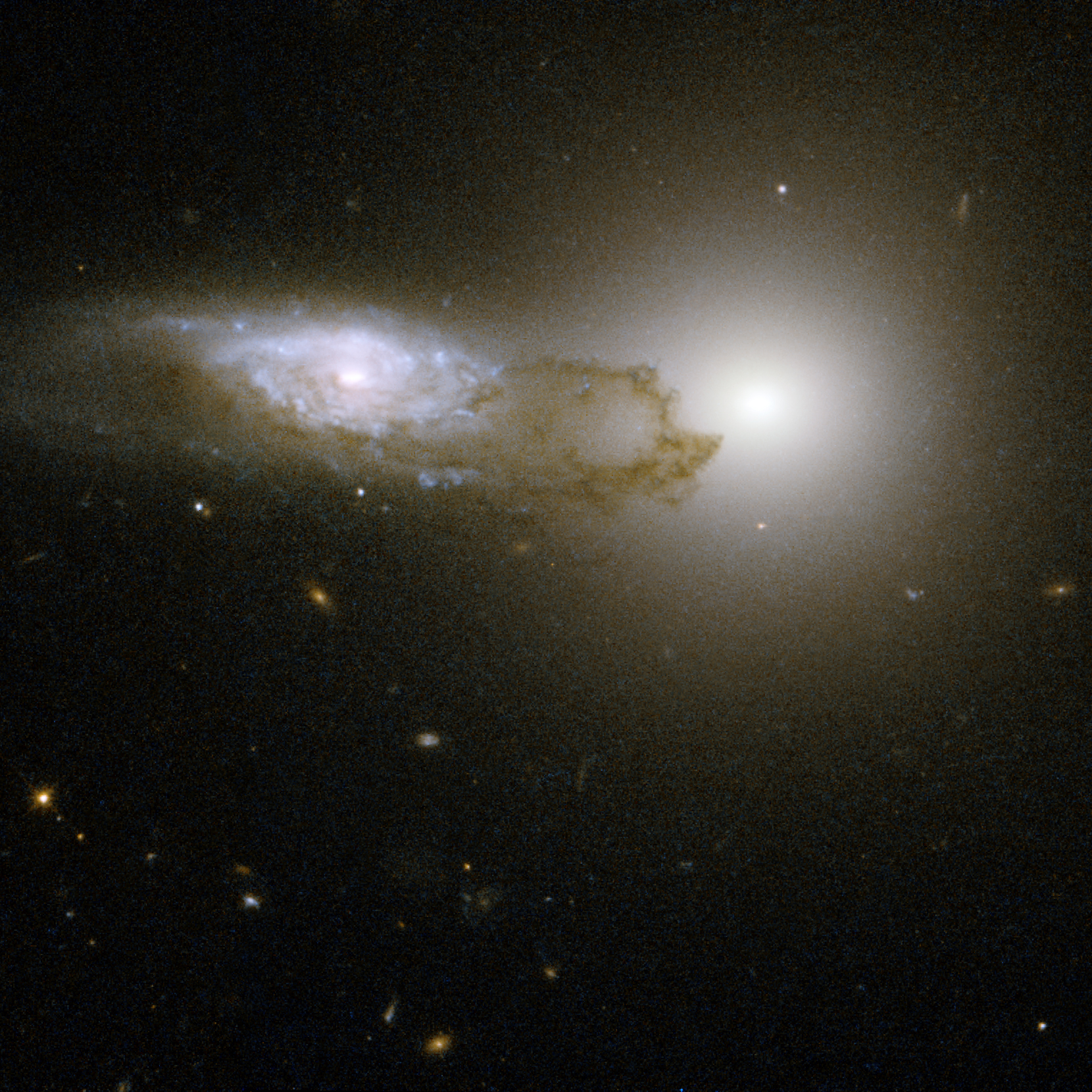
- The pair, photographed by the Hubble Space Telescope

Observation data (J2000 epoch)
- Constellation: Hydra
- Right ascension: 13^{h} 19^{m} 32.9^{s}
- Declination: −24° 29′ 20″
- Redshift: 0.031869
- Heliocentric radial velocity: 9833 km/s
- Apparent magnitude (V): 15.71

Characteristics
- Size: 0.515' x 28.12"

Other designations
- ESO 508-45, IRAS 13168−2413, PGC 46461, 6dFGS gJ131933.0−242922

AM 1316−241 is a pair of overlapping galaxies in the constellation Hydra. It is notable for having recently been discovered to have revealed visible dust by the back light from the more distant galaxy of the two.

It is believed the pair are interacting.

== See also ==
- 2MASX J00482185−2507365 occulting pair – a similar pair
