= UGC 10143 =

Massive elliptical galaxy in the constellation Hercules

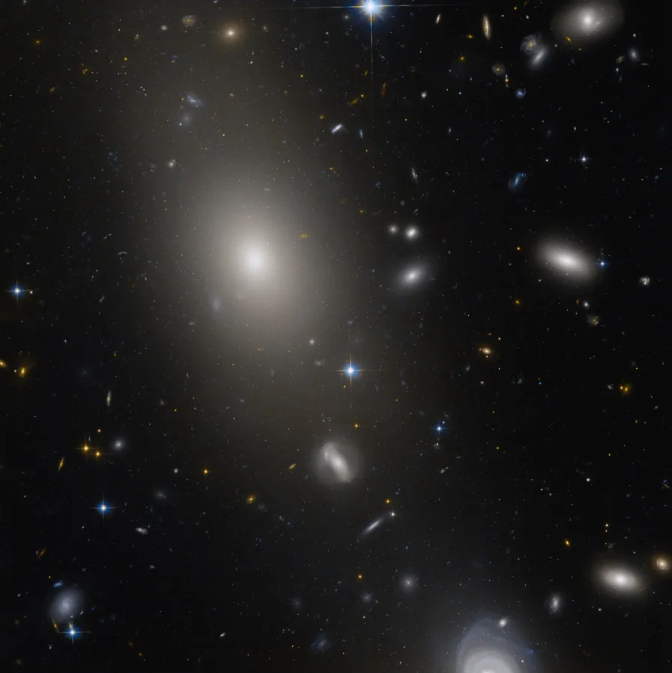
- Hubble Space Telescope image of UGC 10143

Observation data (J2000 epoch)
- Constellation: Hercules
- Right ascension: 16^{h} 02^{m} 17.03^{s}
- Declination: 15° 59' 59.94"
- Redshift: 0.03535
- Heliocentric radial velocity: 10410
- Distance: 537.2 million ly (164.71 million pc)
- Group or cluster: Abell 2147
- Apparent magnitude (B): 14.9

Characteristics
- Type: cD
- Mass: 1.514 trillion M_{☉}
- Size: 312,600 ly (95,830 pc)

Other designations
- Z 108-73, Abell 2147 BCG, VV 159, Arp 324, LEDA 56784

UGC 10143 also known as Abell 2147 BCG, is a supergiant elliptical galaxy, luminous infrared galaxy, active galaxy, radio galaxy, and brightest cluster galaxy in the constellation of Hercules. The galaxy is 537 million light years (or 164,710,000 parsecs) away at a spectroscopic redshift of 0.03535. The galaxy has an apparent B magnitude of 14.9, and it can be observed both in the Northern and Southern Hemispheres. UGC 10143 is the brightest cluster galaxy of Abell 2147, which is a B-M class III galaxy cluster. The galaxy was discovered in 1959 by Boris Vorontsov-Velyaminov's catalogue of interacting galaxies.

== Characteristics ==
UGC 10143 is a large, massive supergiant elliptical galaxy in the galaxy cluster, Abell 2147. The galaxy has a total diameter of 313,000 light years (or 95,830 parsecs), or roughly three times larger than the Milky Way. The size was estimated using intermediate surface brightness (POSS1 103a-O) angular diameter of 2 arcmin, and a mean redshift-independent distance of 537 million light years away (or 164,710,000 parsecs).

UGC 10143 is predicted to be extremely massive, having a dynamical stellar mass of 1.51 trillion M_{☉} (or 10^{12.18}). The galaxy is one of the most massive known in the universe, and is roughly seven times more massive than the stellar mass of the Milky Way.

UGC 10143 is classified as a luminous infrared galaxy, due to the galaxy having an intrinsic K-band luminosity of 224 billion L_{☉} (or 10^{11.35}).

UGC 10143 has an estimated star-formation rate of 1.06 M_{☉}, typical for low-star forming, and gas poor elliptical galaxies.

The galactic center of UGC 10143 has an active galactic nucleus (also known as an AGN), which is a compact region at the center of a galaxy that is extremely luminous and energetic. The active galactic nucleus is powered by an extremely massive, accreting ultramassive black hole (also referred as a UMBH) with a core-break radius derived mass of 26.3 ^{+46.1}_{−16.8} billion M_{☉} (or 10^{10.42 ± 0.44}) (with the range being 9.5 billion M_{☉} to 72.4 billion M_{☉}). However, there are lower mass estimates for the central black hole of 891 ^{+1,453}_{−552} million M_{☉} (10^{8.95 ± 0.42}), and 8.51 ^{+12.87}_{−5.12} billion M_{☉} (10^{9.93 ± 0.40}), but these were calculated using velocity dispersion, and luminosity, which usually leads to underestimated masses.

UGC 10143 has a large population of over 35,000 globular clusters with their brightness, and metal contents measured, which was discovered using data from the Hubble Space Telescope in a survey of star clusters in brightest cluster galaxies. The total mass of all of the 35,000 globular clusters is 5.13 billion M_{☉}.

UGC 10143 is interacting with two different galaxies designated Z 108-70, and Z 108-71. These three galaxies were first noted to be interacting galaxies in 1959 in Boris Vorontsov-Velyaminov's catalogue of interacting galaxies. These galaxies are also considered to be a chain of galaxies by Halton Arp in his atlas of peculiar galaxies.

== X-ray source ==
One x-ray source has been discovered in UGC 10143: 2CXO J160218.2+155912, which is classified as a ultraluminous x-ray source, and it was first found in 2022 in a survey of ULX candidates The x-ray source has a total luminosity of 4 million L_{☉}, equivalent to 1.535*10^{40} erg/s.

== Supernova ==
One supernova has been identified in UGC 10143: SN 2010ad was discovered at magnituide 16 on February 19, 2010 by the Lick Observatory. It was classified as a weak hydrogen line Type II supernova (abbreviated as SNIIb), and is believed to be similar to other supernovae such as SN 1993J. The progenitors of weak hydrogen line Type II supernovae are usually massive stars between 8 M_{☉} and 50 M_{☉}, or interacting binary stars. (SN 2010ad may actually be hosted by the neighboring galaxy, Z 108-71).

== See also ==
- Abell 2147, the galaxy's host cluster.
- A2261-BCG, another brightest cluster galaxy.
- ESO 383-76, hosts a similar mass central black hole.
- Holmberg 15A, similar sized type-cD galaxy.
- List of galaxies with richest globular cluster systems, includes UGC 10143.
