= NGC 3309 =

Galaxy in the constellation Hydra

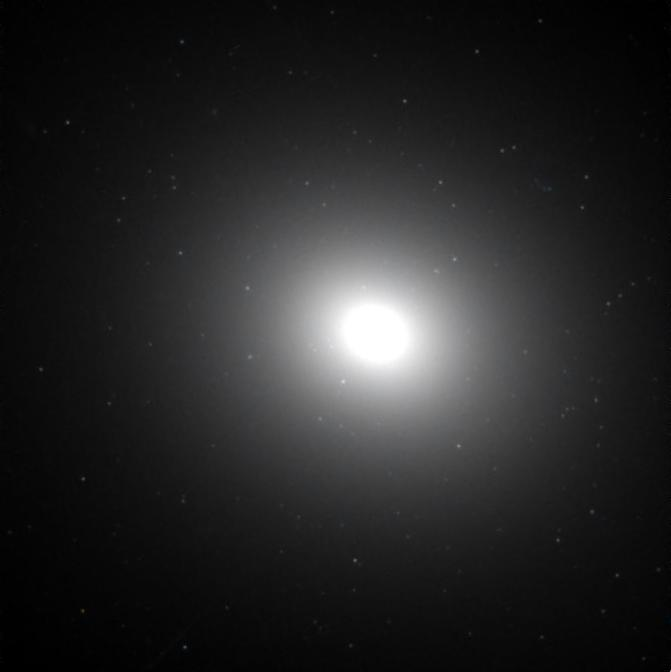
- Hubble Space Telescope image of NGC 3309.

Observation data (J2000 epoch)
- Constellation: Hydra
- Right ascension: 10^{h} 36^{m} 35.6766^{s}
- Declination: −27° 31′ 05.788″
- Redshift: 0.013593
- Heliocentric radial velocity: 4075 ± 4 km/s
- Distance: 197 Mly (60.3 Mpc)
- Group or cluster: Hydra Cluster
- Apparent magnitude (V): 12.60

Characteristics
- Type: E3
- Size: ~146,400 ly (44.88 kpc) (estimated)
- Apparent size (V): 1.9 x 1.6
- Notable features: Radio Jet

Other designations
- ESO 501-036, AM 1034-271, MCG -04-25-034, PGC 31466

NGC 3309 is a giant elliptical galaxy located about 200 million light-years away in the constellation Hydra. NGC 3309 was discovered by astronomer John Herschel on March 24, 1835. The galaxy forms a pair with NGC 3311 which lies about 72,000 ly (22 kpc) away. Both galaxies dominate the center of the Hydra Cluster.

== Radio Jet ==
NGC 3309 has a radio jet emerging out of its center. The jet is two-sided and the northeastern part of the jet appears to end in a spur. The southwestern part of the jet lies along a straight line. At a projected distance of about ~3,300 ly (1 kpc) from the nucleus, the jet appears to narrow into a nozzle-like structure before it expands into a lobe extending away from the galaxy.

The predominant part of the radio emission in the Hydra Cluster comes from NGC 3309. The radio emission in NGC 3309 may have been triggered by a recent perturbation with the giant spiral galaxy NGC 3312.

== Globular clusters ==
NGC 3309 has an estimated population of about 364 ± 210 globular clusters. Due to the influence of the nearby galaxy NGC 3311, NGC 3309 may have been stripped of part of its original globular cluster system with some of the galaxy's globular clusters becoming members of NGC 3311's population.

== See also ==
- List of NGC objects (3001–4000)
- Messier 87
- NGC 4874
- NGC 4889
