= Abell 2147 =

Galaxy cluster in the constellation Virgo

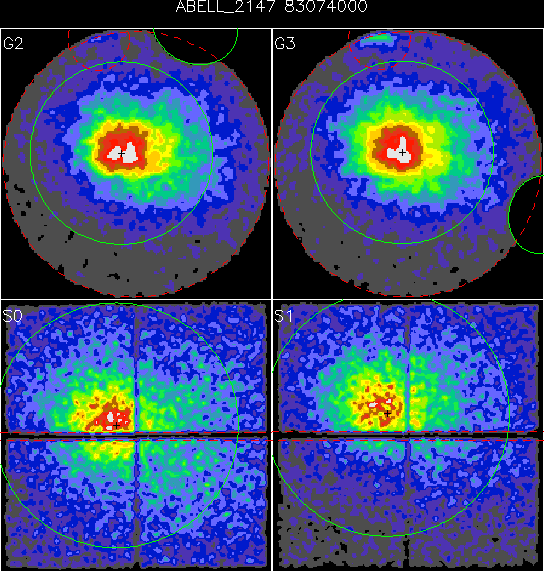

Observation data (Epoch J2000)
- Constellation: Virgo
- Right ascension: 16^{h} 02^{m} 17.2^{s}
- Declination: +15° 53′ 43″
- Richness class: 1
- Redshift: 0.03500 (10 493 km/s)
- Distance: 149 Mpc (486 Mly) h^{−1}_{0.705}
- X-ray flux: (53.20 ± 7.0%)×10^{−12} erg s^{−1} cm^{−2} (0.1–2.4 keV)

Abell 2147 is a galaxy cluster in the Abell catalogue. It is located within the core of the Hercules Superclusters (SCI 160), within Serpens Caput, near the cluster Abell 2152, approximately two degrees south southwest of the Hercules Cluster (Abell 2151). It is possible that Abell 2147 is actually part of the Hercules Cluster considering that it shares the same redshift of 550 million light years.

This galaxy cluster contains mostly faint, small and scattered galaxies.

== Radial Profile ==
The extraction regions were chosen based on an exposure corrected, combined GIS-2 and GIS-3 sky image. Reference sky coordinates from the literature were used as input to a centroid routine to determine the cluster center right ascension and declination. A radial emission profile was then constructed from this position. Note that this radial profile does not reflect the true cluster profile given the complicated PSF of the ASCA mirrors and the GIS detector. The background (and sigma of the background) was iterative determined by stepping inward from the end of the profile and averaging (using a three sigma clipping algorithm). The extraction region was chosen to be the radius at which the radial profile reached 5*sigma times the background level.

The radial profile is shown below. The red line is the background level. The blue line is the 5*sigma level. SIS extraction radii were set at 0.70 times the GIS extraction radius.

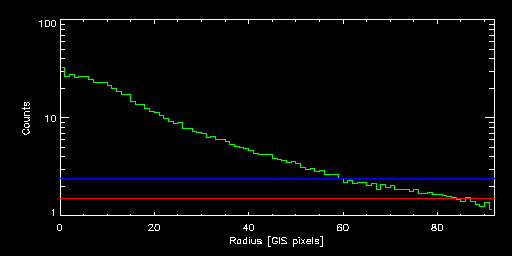

== See also ==
- Abell catalogue
- List of Abell clusters
- UGC 10143, brightest cluster galaxy of Abell 2147.
- X-ray astronomy
