= HD 92036 =

Star in the constellation Hydra

- Location of HD 92036 (circled in red)

Observation data Epoch J2000.0 Equinox ICRS
- Constellation: Hydra
- Right ascension: 10^{h} 37^{m} 13.72508^{s}
- Declination: −27° 24′ 45.4713″
- Apparent magnitude (V): 4.87

Characteristics
- Evolutionary stage: AGB
- Spectral type: M1III:Ba0.5
- B−V color index: +1.626±0.009

Astrometry
| Radial velocity (R_{v}) | +16.9±2.8 km/s |
| Proper motion (μ) | RA: −114.142 mas/yr Dec.: +19.712 mas/yr |
| Parallax (π) | 6.5530±0.2634 mas |
| Distance | 500 ± 20 ly (153 ± 6 pc) |
| Absolute magnitude (M_{V}) | −1.00 |

Details
| Radius | 57.46+5.43 −4.05 R_{☉} |
| Luminosity | 740.8±33.7 L_{☉} |
| Temperature | 3,972+148 −175 K |

Other designations
- CD−26°8033, FK5 2848, HD 92036, HIP 51979, HR 4162, SAO 179041

Database references
| SIMBAD | data |

HD 92036 is a single star in the equatorial constellation of Hydra. Its apparent magnitude is 4.87. This is an aging red giant star on the asymptotic giant branch with a stellar classification of M1III:Ba0.5.
