= IC 4051 =

Galaxy in the constellation Coma Berenices

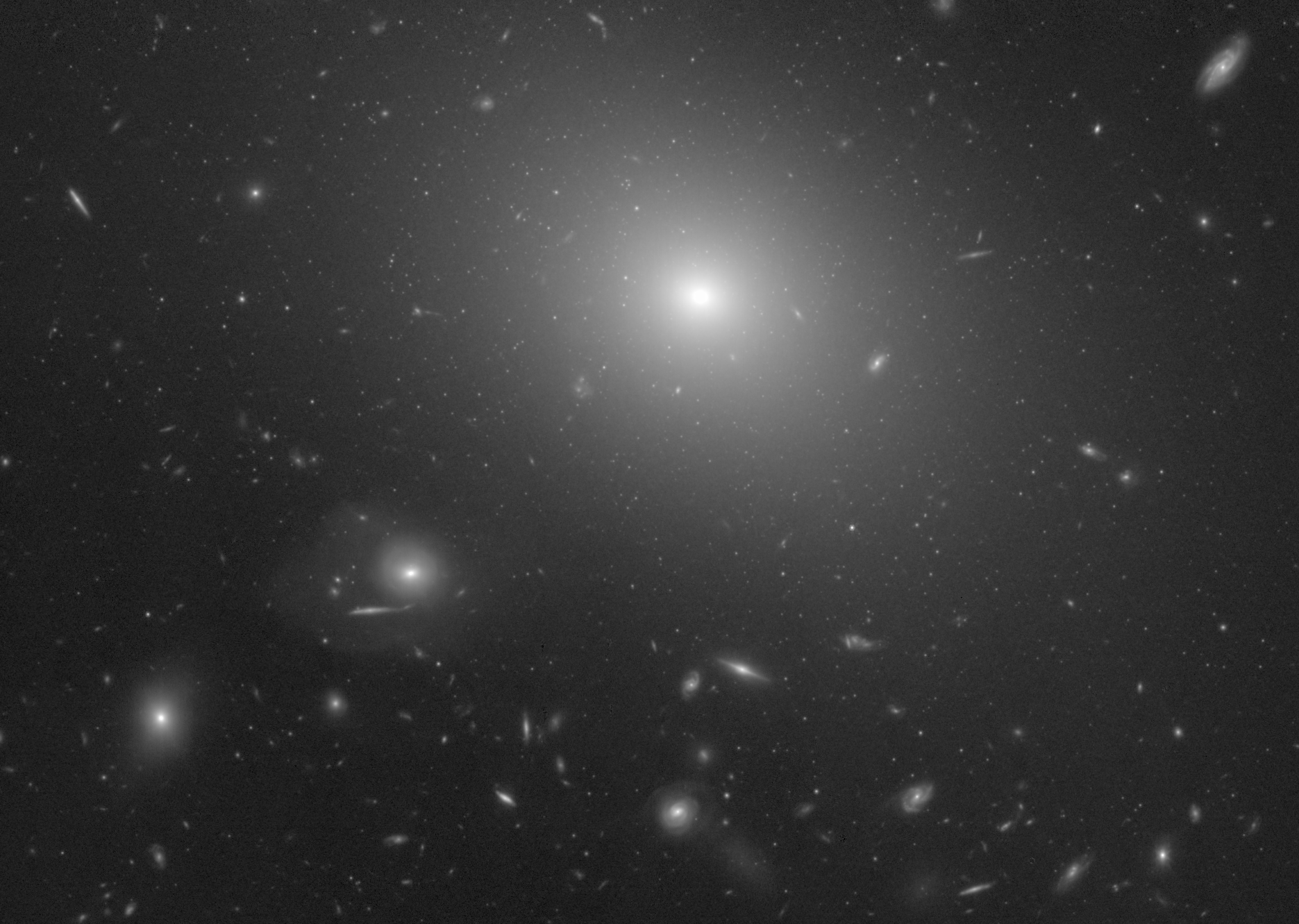
- James Webb Space Telescope image of IC 4051

Observation data (J2000 epoch)
- Constellation: Coma Berenices
- Right ascension: 13^{h} 00^{m} 54.463^{s}
- Declination: +28° 00′ 27.50″
- Redshift: 0.011071±0.00003
- Heliocentric radial velocity: 3,286 km/s
- Distance: 330 Mly (100 Mpc)
- Group or cluster: Coma Cluster
- Apparent magnitude (V): 13.2
- Apparent magnitude (B): 14.17
- Absolute magnitude (V): −21.62±0.35

Characteristics
- Type: E2

Other designations
- IC 4501, LEDA 52810, MCG -04-35-009

IC 4051 is a large elliptical galaxy in the northern constellation of Coma Berenices. It was discovered by the French astronomer Guillaume Bigourdan on April 12, 1891. This object is located 14′ east of the core of the large Coma Cluster of galaxies, at a distance of 330 million light-years (100 Mpc) from the Milky Way. With a combined apparent visual magnitude of 13.20, it is the fifth brightest galaxy within a degree of the cluster core. The galaxy displays a significant radial velocity difference from the cluster as a whole, indicating that it may oscillate back-and-forth through the cluster and is now passing through the more dense core at high velocity.

The morphological classification of IC 4051 is E2, indicating a slightly oval-shaped elliptical galaxy. The structure of the galaxy is relatively compact, suggesting it has undergone tidal trimming of its halo from the surrounding galaxy cluster. It has a peculiar core that is counter-rotating with respect to the galaxy as a whole. This core region extends out to an angular radius of 4″, which corresponds to a physical radius of about 8,800 light-years (2.7 kpc). This star population is old and metal-rich, but contributes only 1% of the total galactic luminosity.

IC 4051 has an unusually large population of globular clusters, comparable to a Type-cD galaxy. Most of these clusters appear metal-rich. The evolutionary picture of this galaxy suggests that it was stripped of most of its gas after the globular cluster population was formed in situ, with the gas being carried away during the early passages through the cluster core. Metal-rich globulars are found within about 33,000 light-years (10 kpc) of the galactic center, while the metal-poor globulars are found further out in a halo orbiting the galaxy.

SN 1950A was a Type I supernova event that was discovered by M. L. Humason from photographic plates taken March 20 and April 11, 1950. It was positioned 13.0″ North and 1.5″ West of the galactic center of IC 4051. The event was at magnitude 17.7±0.1 on March 20.
