= NGC 154 =

Elliptical galaxy in the constellation Cetus

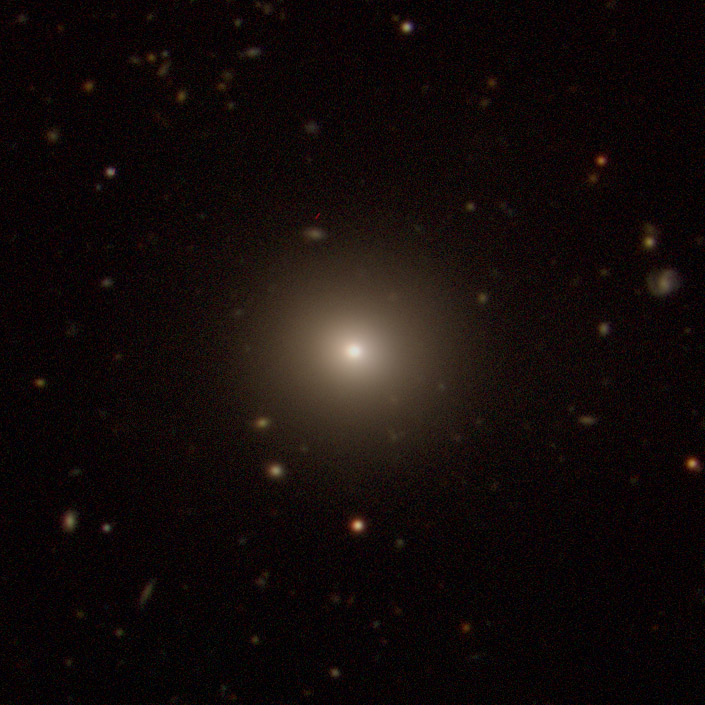
- DECam image of NGC 154

Observation data (J2000 epoch)
- Constellation: Cetus
- Right ascension: 00^{h} 34^{m} 19.469^{s}
- Declination: −12° 39′ 22.50″
- Redshift: 0.026785
- Heliocentric radial velocity: 8030
- Distance: 404.00 ± 86.15 Mly (123.867 ± 26.413 Mpc)
- Apparent magnitude (B): 14

Characteristics
- Type: E
- Size: 41,100 ly (12,610 pc) (Note: POSS1 103a-O values used.)
- Apparent size (V): 1.1′ × 0.9′

Other designations
- MGC -02-02-053, PGC 2058

NGC 154 is an elliptical galaxy in the constellation Cetus. The galaxy was discovered by Frederick William Herschel on November 27, 1785.
