= NGC 3314 =

Spiral galaxies in the constellation Hydra

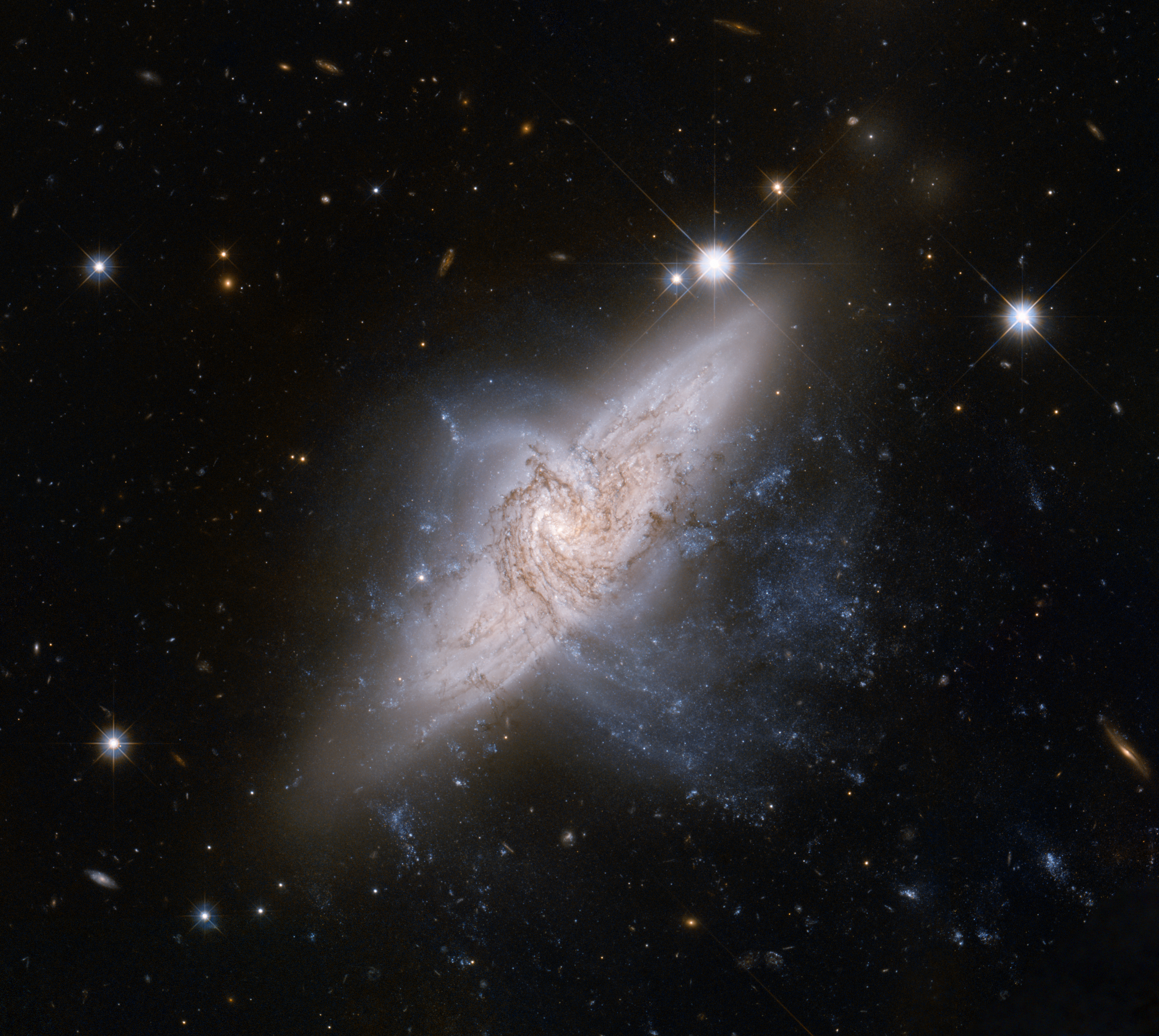
- NGC 3314a (foreground) and NGC 3314b (background) imaged by the Hubble Space Telescope

Observation data (J2000 epoch)
- Constellation: Hydra
- Right ascension: 10^{h} 37^{m} 13.2^{s}
- Declination: −27° 41′ 04.0″
- Redshift: 0.009537 (a); 0.015481 (b)
- Distance: 154.0 ± 10.9 Mly (47.23 ± 3.33 Mpc) (a); 239.8 ± 16.8 Mly (73.52 ± 5.16 Mpc) (b)
- Apparent magnitude (V): 14

Characteristics
- Type: SBbc/SAab
- Apparent size (V): 2′.6 × 1′.7
- Notable features: galaxy overlapping another

Other designations
- (NGC 3314): ESO 501-46, AM 1034-272, MCG-04-25-041; (NGC 3314A): LEDA 31531; (NGC 3314B): LEDA 31532

NGC 3314 is a pair of overlapping spiral galaxies in the constellation of Hydra. The pair was discovered by British astronomer John Herschel on 24 March 1835. Herschel and others did not realize that what appeared to be a single galaxy, is actually two galaxies in the same line of sight.

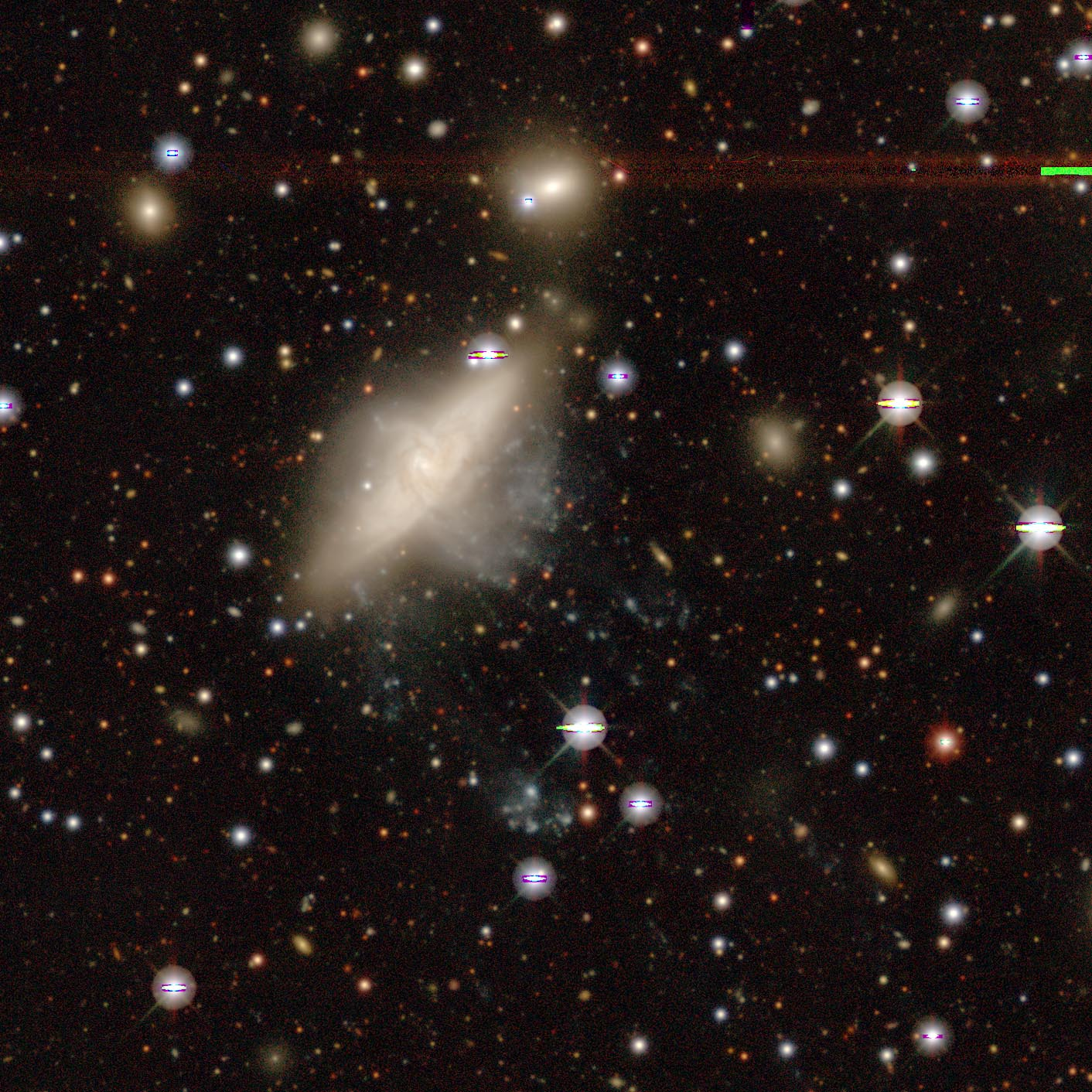
NGC 3314 as seen by the legacy surveys, shows a large extended tail, mostly coming from the foreground galaxy, this is seen as signs of ram pressure

The unique alignment of both spiral galaxies gives astronomers the opportunity to measure the properties of interstellar dust in the face-on foreground galaxy (NGC 3314a). The dust appears as dark blue against the background galaxy (NGC 3314b). Unlike interacting galaxies, the two components of NGC 3314 are physically unrelated, and are too distant from one another to interact.

In a March 2000 observation of the galaxies, a prominent green star-like object was seen in one of the arms of one of the galaxies. Astronomers theorized that it could have been a supernova, but the unique filtering properties of the foreground galaxy made it difficult to decide definitively. NGC 3314a has its spiral arms and copious amounts of dust obscuring the background galaxy NGC 3314b.

A dust tail can also be seen from NGC 3314a, being a sign of Ram Pressure stripping caused by NGC 3314a rushing through the ICM of its home cluster, the Hydra Cluster. Both of the galaxies are members of the Hydra Cluster.
