= NGC 3311 =

Galaxy in the constellation Hydra

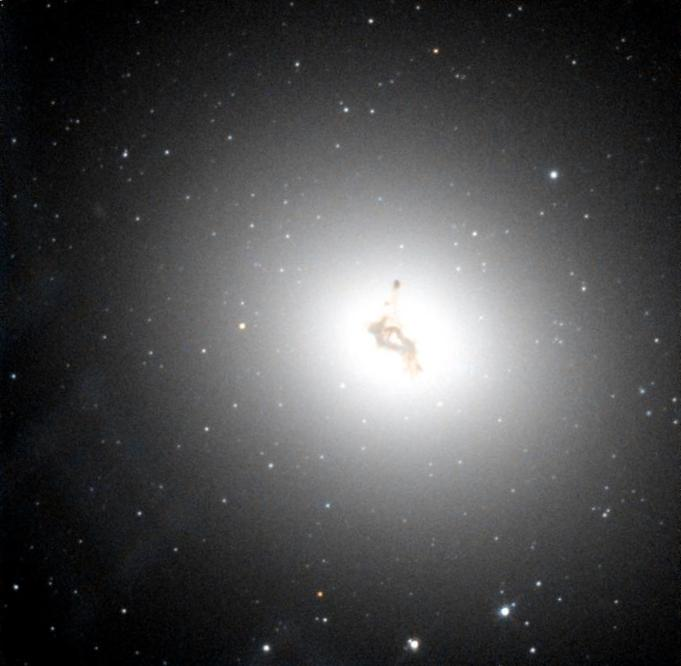
- HST image of NGC 3311

Observation data (J2000 epoch)
- Constellation: Hydra
- Right ascension: 10^{h} 36^{m} 42.8^{s}
- Declination: −27° 31′ 42″
- Redshift: 0.012759
- Heliocentric radial velocity: 3,825 km/s
- Distance: 190 Mly (57 Mpc)
- Group or cluster: Hydra Cluster
- Apparent magnitude (V): 12.65

Characteristics
- Type: cD2, E+2
- Number of stars: more than 1 trillion
- Size: ~415,000 ly (127 kpc) (estimated)
- Apparent size (V): 3.5 × 2.9
- Notable features: Massive globular cluster population

Other designations
- ESO 501-38, AM 1034-271, MCG -4-25-36, PGC 31478

NGC 3311 is a super-giant elliptical galaxy (a type-cD galaxy) located about 190 million light-years away in the constellation Hydra. The galaxy was discovered by astronomer John Herschel on March 30, 1835. NGC 3311 is the brightest member of the Hydra Cluster and forms a pair with NGC 3309 which along with NGC 3311, dominate the central region of the Hydra Cluster.

NGC 3311 is surrounded by a rich and extensive globular cluster system rivaling that of Messier 87 in the Virgo Cluster.

== Physical characteristics ==
The central region of NGC 3311 is obscured by a dust cloud with an estimated diameter of 1,700 ly (0.53 kpc). It has an amorphous and complex structure and its small size and disturbed morphology suggests that the cloud originated from a merger event with another galaxy that occurred within the past 10 million years. Oddly though, there are no shells or isophote distortions in the outer regions of NGC 3311 that would have been the result of such a recent merger. Other scenarios for the origin of the dust cloud are by a cooling flow or by galactic wind failure.

The total estimated mass of the dust cloud is 4,600 solar masses (4.6×10^{4} M☉).

In NGC 3311, it has been detected that there is an excess blue population in the central region of the galaxy. The spectrum of the galaxy appears to resemble that of an H II region. This suggests that the excess blue population represents an ongoing formation of young bright stars.

=== Outer halo ===
The outer halo of NGC 3311 appears to have formed from the accretion and mergers of massive satellite galaxies in vicinity of the galaxy. The halo is made up of intra-cluster stars with a dominant part of these stars coming from the outskirts of bright early-type galaxies and the rest originating from dwarf galaxies. However, the build-up of its extended halo is still ongoing due to the infall of a group of 14 dwarf galaxies including the galaxies HCC 026 and HCC 007 that are currently being tidally disputed and adding their stars to the outer halo. In contrast, the inner galaxy formed from the mergers of gas-rich lumps reminiscent of the first phase of galaxy formation.

==== Stellar populations ====
The stars in the central region of NGC 3311 and in the halo are very old, with ages of over 10 Gyrs. However, the stars in the central galaxy have a higher metallicity than the halo suggesting the stars in the stars in the central galaxy formed in a rapid but short period of star formation that occurred early on though a gas-rich dissipative collapse while the stars in halo formed in smaller accreted satellite galaxies with more extended star formation.

=== Off-centered envelope ===
NGC 3311 contains an off-centered envelope that was first detected by Arnaboldi et al. The off-centered envelope has a higher metallicity than the outer halo and is located close to the infalling group of dwarf galaxies.

The envelope appears to have been offset from the center of NGC 3311 by a tidal interaction with the dark matter halos of the infalling group of dwarf galaxies or halo associated with NGC 3309. This tidal interaction would have also stripped gas and dust from the outer halo of NGC 3311.

=== Intracluster planetary nebulae ===
Around 60 intracluster planetary nebulae have been detected surrounding NGC 3311.

== Supermassive black hole ==
NGC 3311 is host to a supermassive black hole with an estimated mass of 126 million solar masses (1.26 × 10^{8} M_{☉}).

== Dark matter halo ==
NGC 3311 appears to have a cored dark matter halo.

== Radio source ==
NGC 3311 has a weak radio source with a total 6 cm flux density of 0.3 mJy.

Although NGC 3311 has a weak radio source, it is bright in X-rays.

== Globular clusters ==
NGC 3311 has one of the largest globular cluster systems known in the local universe. With an estimated population of about 16,500 ± 2,000 globular clusters, NGC 3311's globular cluster system rivals that of Messier 87's, which has about 13,000 globular clusters. NGC 3309, another nearby giant elliptical has an unusually low number of globular clusters. This suggests that NGC 3311 stripped part of NGC 3309's globular clusters, with some of its globular clusters becoming members of NGC 3311's system.

NGC 3311's globular cluster system was initially detected in 1976 and was found by Harris et al. in 1983 to contain a massive globular cluster system similar to Messier 87.

An analysis by Secker et al. in 1995 using Washington photometry from the Cerro Tololo Inter-American Observatory concluded that NGC 3311 had the most metal-rich globular cluster system known, with a complete absence of populations of metal-poor and intermediate-metallicity globular clusters. However, Brodie et al. and Wehner et al. determined that the globular cluster system shows a bimodal color distribution with equal numbers of metal-rich and metal-poor clusters.

=== Ultra-compact dwarf galaxies ===
A large population of about 50 ultra-compact dwarf galaxies (UDCs) have been detected in the Hydra Cluster, with most of them being dynamically associated to NGC 3311. It appears that the UDCs, especially the brighter and more massive ones such as HUCD1 with a mass of 5×10^{7} and a half-light radius of 83 ly (25.4 pc), are the remnant nuclei of dwarf galaxies whose stellar envelopes were stripped off during an interaction with another galaxy or the cluster itself.

== See also ==
- List of NGC objects (3001–4000)
- NGC 3309
- Messier 87
- NGC 4874
- NGC 4889
