= Hydra Cluster =

Galaxy cluster in the constellation Hydra

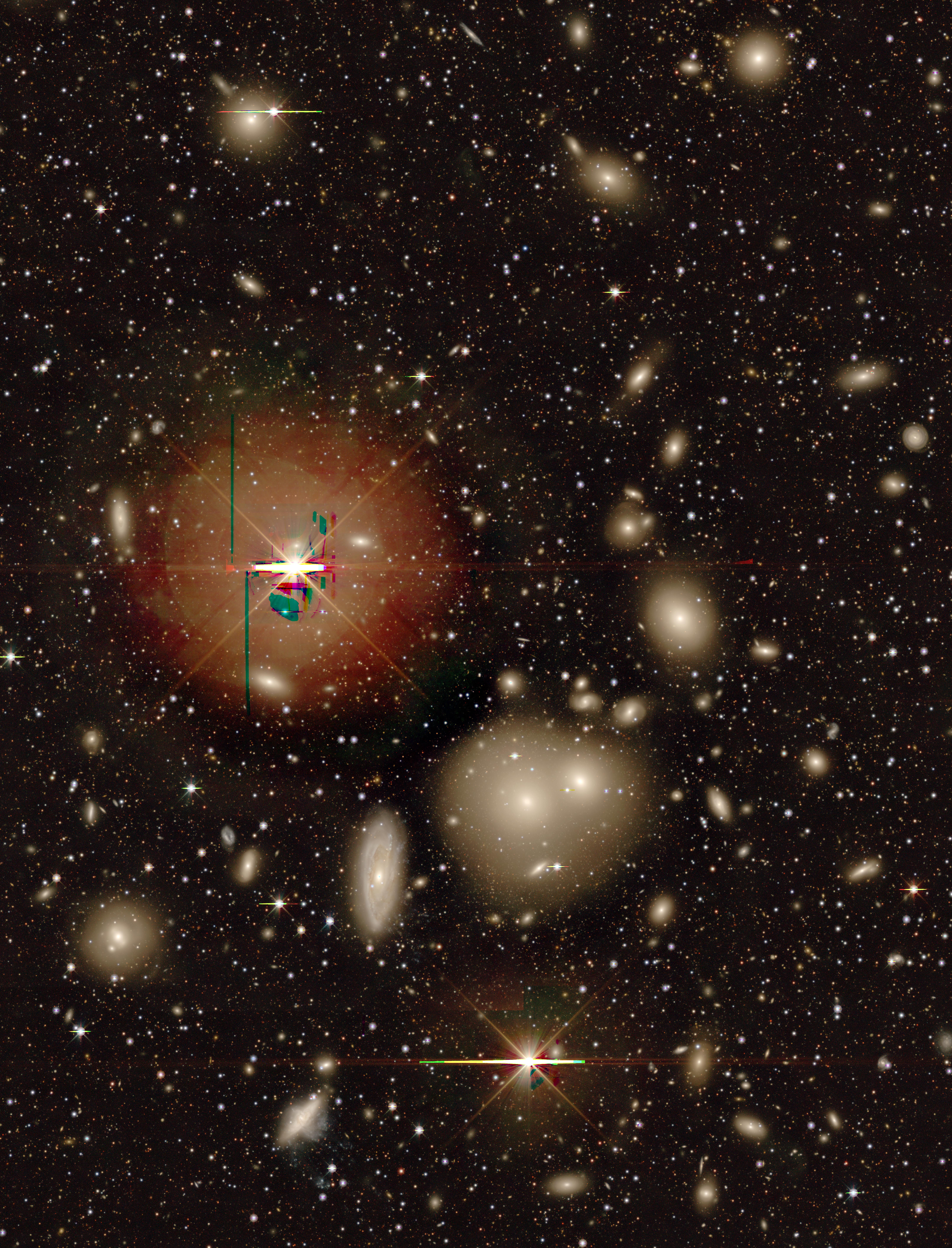
- Central region of Abell 1060 (Hydra Cluster) with legacy surveys. The bright stars are HD 92036 (middle left) and HD 91964 (bottom)

Observation data (Epoch J2000)
- Constellation: Hydra
- Right ascension: 10^{h} 36^{m} 42.7100^{s}
- Declination: −27° 31′ 42.900″
- Number of galaxies: 157
- Richness class: 1
- Bautz–Morgan classification: III
- Redshift: 0.012389 ± 0.000123
- Distance: 58.3 Mpc (190.1 Mly) h^{−1}_{0.705}
- X-ray flux: 6.1×10^{−11} erg s^{−1} cm^{−2} (0.5–2 keV)

Other designations
- Abell 1060

The Hydra Cluster (or Abell 1060) is a galaxy cluster that contains 157 bright galaxies, appearing in the constellation Hydra. The cluster spans about ten million light-years and has an unusually high proportion of dark matter. The cluster is part of the Hydra–Centaurus Supercluster located 158 million light-years from Earth. The cluster's largest galaxies are elliptical galaxies NGC 3309 and NGC 3311 and the spiral galaxy NGC 3312 all having a diameter of about 150,000 light-years. In spite of a nearly circular appearance on the sky, there is evidence in the galaxy velocities for a clumpy, three-dimensional distribution.

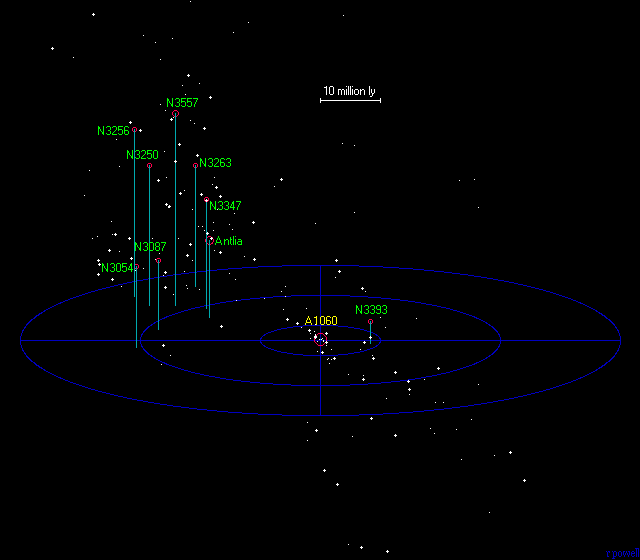
A map of Hydra Cluster

== Related reading ==
- Wehner, Elizabeth M. H. and Harris, William E. (10 August 2006) UCD candidates in the Hydra Cluster . ArXiv.org. ApL Letters
- The Hydra Cluster on WikiSky: DSS2, SDSS, GALEX, IRAS, Hydrogen α, X-Ray, Astrophoto, Sky Map, Articles and images
