= IC 310 =

Lenticular galaxy in the constellation Perseus

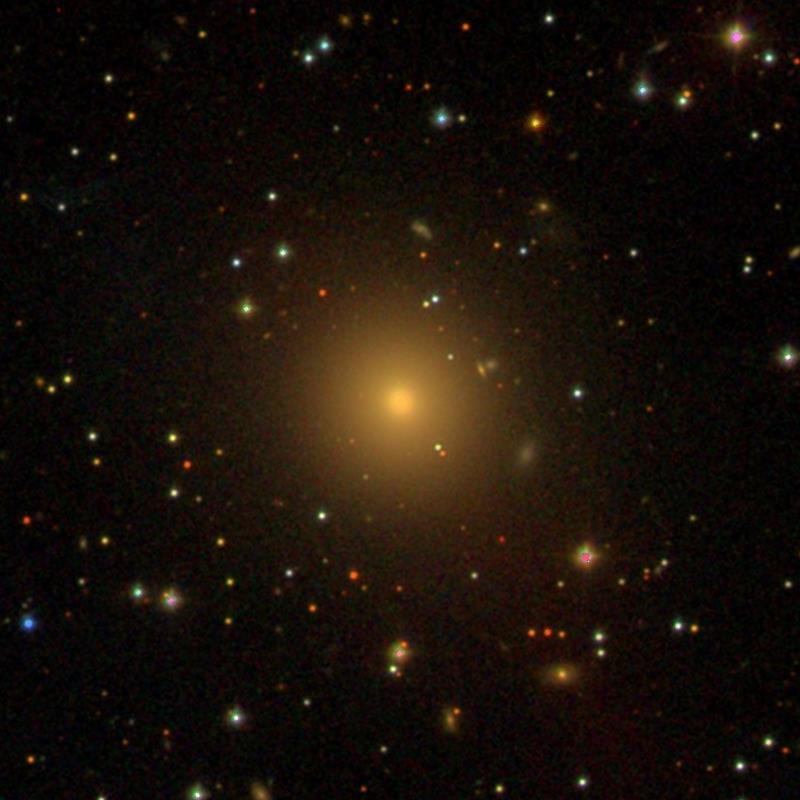
- IC 310 by Sloan Digital Sky Survey

Observation data (J2000 epoch)
- Constellation: Perseus
- Right ascension: 03^{h} 16^{m} 42.977^{s}
- Declination: +41° 19′ 29.9″
- Redshift: 0.018849
- Heliocentric radial velocity: 5,651 km/s
- Distance: 265 Mly (81.2 Mpc)
- Group or cluster: Perseus Cluster

Characteristics
- Type: SA(r)0^0^
- Apparent size (V): 1.3' × 1.3'
- Notable features: radio galaxy

Other designations
- UGC 2624, CGCG 540-075, MCG +07-07-045, 22W 018, IRAS 03135+4108, PGC 12171, TXS 0313+411, NVSS J031642+411928, TeV J0316+413

IC 310 is a lenticular galaxy located in the constellation Perseus. It is located 265 million light-years from Earth, which means, given its apparent dimensions, it is about 117,000 light-years across. The galaxy was discovered by Edward D. Swift on November 3, 1888.

== Characteristics ==
IC 310 is classified as a head-tail radio galaxy or specifically a narrow-angle tail radio galaxy described by Sijbring et at. 1998 and Feretti et at. 1998. IC 310 has an active nucleus (AGN) and seems to represent a low-luminosity FRI radio galaxy at the borderline angle which reveals its BL Lac-type central engine.

At the redshift of z = 0.0189, it is one of the brightest objects detected in the Perseus Cluster at both radio frequencies and X-ray energies, and also the fourth closest AGN detected in terms of VHE gamma rays after Centaurus A, Messier 87 (M 87), and 3C 84 known as NGC 1275 which belongs to same cluster. It shares the similar properties similar to M 87, which the emission can be traced to its blazar-like central engine but shows time variability and hard spectrum that is harder to the spectrum.

In addition, IC 310 is identified as a γ-ray emitter based on the observations at GeV energies with Fermi-LAT and with MAGIC telescopes at high energies (VHE, E > 100 GeV), making it a subject of curiosity since its nucleus displays blazar-like behavior. According to further studies, it is suggested IC 310 is the closest blazar and key object for AGN research, due to the fact, a blazar-like radio jet has been found using parsec-scale VLBL imaging, together with the unusual flat gamma-ray spectrum and variable high-energy emission.

There is a point-like emission in IC 310 according the XMM-Newton observation, without signs of the structure correlated with its radio halo tail. The temperature of the intracluster medium decreases as a function of distance from the cluster center from kT ~ 6 keV located northwest corner of the field to about 3 KeV in the southwest region. Although no shape edges found in the surface brightness profile, there is a brightness excess of a smooth β model by about 20% seen. There is an increase in temperature by 10% in the same region indicating the region in IC 310 is infalling into the Perseus Cluster. The gas in front of the galaxy is compressed as well, indicating the IC 310 system is undergoing a merger.

== Black hole ==
A supermassive black hole inside IC 310 has been found to weigh over 300 million times the mass of the sun. According to an observation, over 250 million years ago, the high gamma-ray radiation left the vicinity of the black hole and reached Earth between the night of 12 and 13 November 2012, which was observed by the pair of 17m diameter MAGIC Telescopes in La Plama.

This showed an impressively bright flare on the variability time scales on minutes reaching up average flux level in the night up to one Crab above 1 TeV with hard spectrum over the past 20 years in energy. It showed a series of strong outbursts from the intra-night light curve. This shows the fast variability that constrains the size of the gamma-ray emission regime, to shrink 20% of the gravitation radius from the black hole challenging shock acceleration models.

== Group membership ==
IC 310 belongs to the NGC 1275 group, which is part of the Perseus Cluster. Other members include NGC 1224, NGC 1267, NGC 1270, NGC 1273, NGC 1277, NGC 1279, IC 288, IC 294 and IC 312.
