= NGC 1270 =

Galaxy in the constellation Perseus

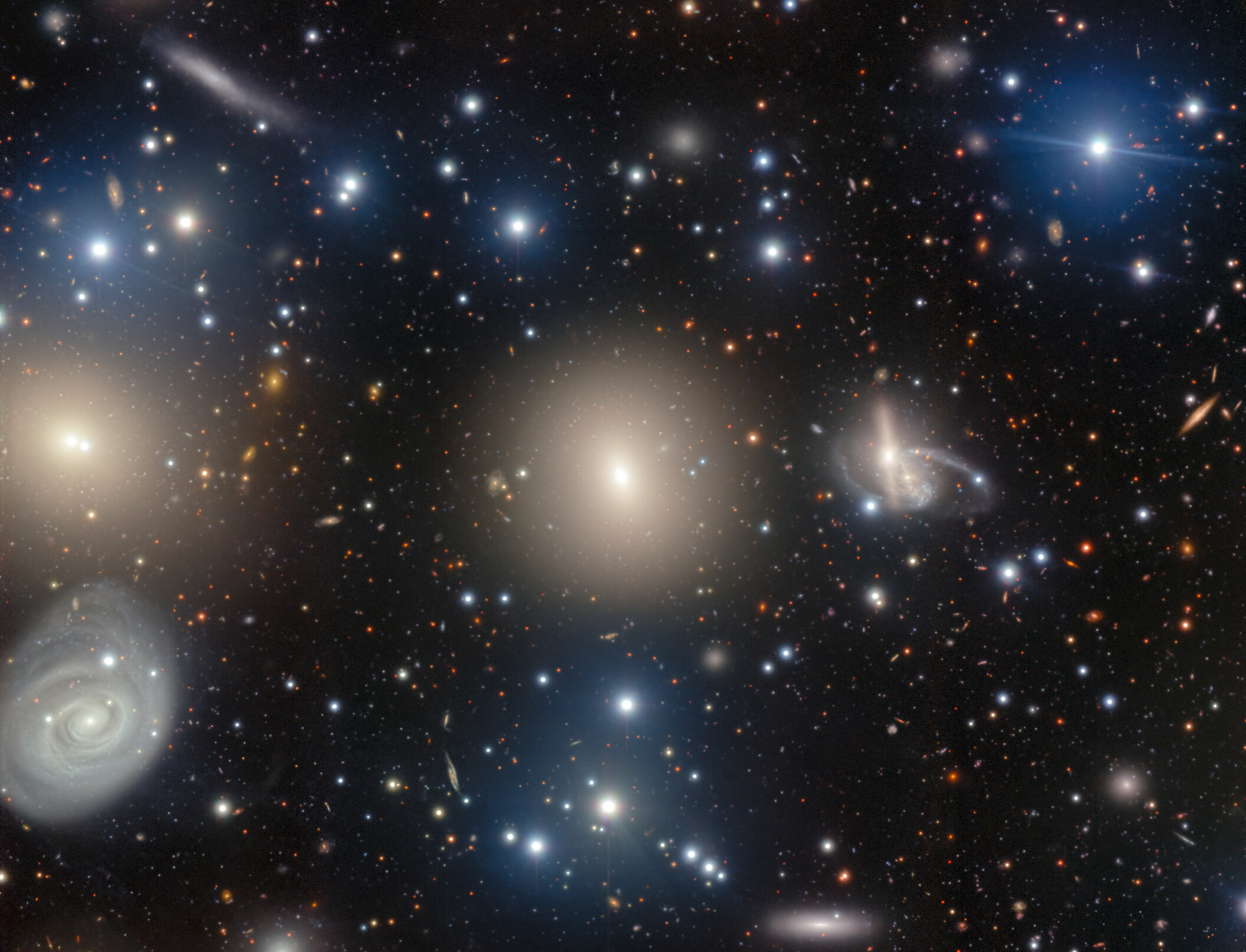
- NGC 1270 imaged by the Gemini North Telescope

Observation data (J2000 epoch)
- Constellation: Perseus
- Right ascension: 03^{h} 18^{m} 58.0987^{s}
- Declination: +41° 28′ 12.467″
- Redshift: 0.016569
- Heliocentric radial velocity: 4967 ± 2 km/s
- Distance: 231.2 ± 16.2 Mly (70.90 ± 4.97 Mpc)
- Group or cluster: Perseus Cluster
- Apparent magnitude (V): 14.26

Characteristics
- Type: E
- Size: ~139,400 ly (42.75 kpc) (estimated)
- Apparent size (V): 1.5 x 1.2

Other designations
- UGC 2660, MCG +07-07-057, PGC 12350, CGCG 540-095

NGC 1270 is an elliptical galaxy located about 250 million light-years away in the constellation Perseus. It was discovered by astronomer Heinrich d'Arrest on February 14, 1863. NGC 1270 is a member of the Perseus Cluster and has an estimated age of about 11 billion years. However, Greene et al. puts the age of NGC 1270 at about 15.0 ± 0.50 Gy.

NGC 1270 has a supermassive black hole with an estimated mass of 12 billion solar masses (12×10^{9} M_{☉}).

== Activity ==
Spectroscopy of NGC 1270 suggests that the galaxy contains a low-luminosity AGN (LLAGN).

== NGC 1275 Group ==
NGC 1270 is a member of the NGC 1275 group (also known as LGG 88) which has at least 48 members, including NGC 1224, NGC 1267, NGC 1273, NGC 1275, NGC 1277, NGC 1279, IC 288, IC 294, IC 310, and IC 312.

== See also ==
- List of NGC objects (1001–2000)
- NGC 1277
- NGC 1271
