= Phoenix Cluster =

Galaxy cluster in the constellation Phoenix

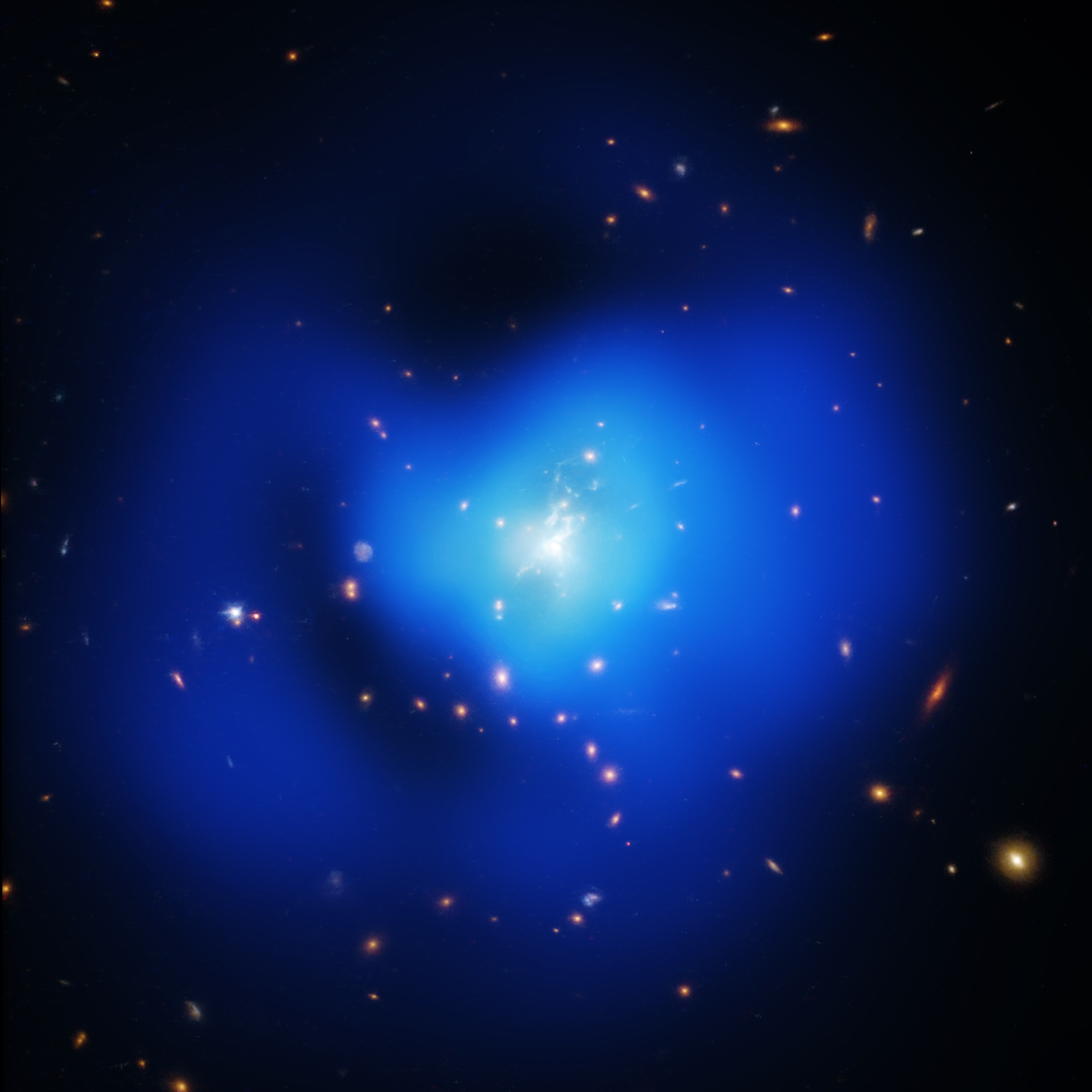
- The cluster in a composite image of X-ray and visible light. Large holes in the blue emission are two vast outer cavities. Smaller inner cavities are at top right and bottom left of the central galaxy.

Observation data (Epoch J2000.0)
- Constellation: Phoenix
- Right ascension: 23^{h} 44^{m} 40.9^{s}
- Declination: −42° 41′ 54″
- Brightest member: Phoenix A (mag 18.2)
- Number of galaxies: 42 known
- Redshift: 0.597320±0.000150 (center)
- Distance: 2,640.6 ± 184.8 megaparsecs (8.61 ± 0.60 billion light-years) (present comoving); 1,796.38 megaparsecs (5.86 billion light-years) (light-travel)
- Binding mass: (1.26–2.5)×10^{15} M_{☉}

Other designations
- Phoenix Cluster, SPT-CL J 2344 -4243, SPT-CL J2344-4243

The Phoenix Cluster (SPT-CL J2344-4243) is a supermassive, Abell-class type I galaxy cluster located at its namesake, southern constellation of Phoenix. It was initially detected in 2010 during a 2,500-square-degree survey of the southern sky using the Sunyaev–Zeldovich effect by the South Pole Telescope collaboration. It is one of the most massive galaxy clusters known, with the mass on the order of 2×10^{15} M_{☉}, and is the most luminous X-ray cluster discovered, producing more X-rays than any other known massive cluster. It is located at a comoving distance of 8.61 billion light-years (2.64 gigaparsecs) from Earth. About 42 member galaxies were identified and currently listed in the SIMBAD Astronomical Database, though the real number may be as high as 1,000 galaxies.

== Discovery ==
The Phoenix Cluster was first reported in a newspaper by R. Williamson and colleagues during a survey by the South Pole Telescope in Antarctica, being one of the 26 galaxy clusters identified by the survey. The detection has been conducted at frequencies between 95, 150 and 220 GHz, with 14 of the galaxy clusters detected have been previously identified, while 12—including Phoenix Cluster, being new discoveries. The would-be named Phoenix Cluster (still identified by its numerical catalogue entry SPT-CL J2344–4243) has been remarked to be having "the largest X-ray luminosity of any cluster" described by the survey. A bright, type-2 Seyfert galaxy has also been pronounced lying 19 arcseconds from the apparent center of the cluster that has been identified as 2MASX J23444387-4243124, which would later be named Phoenix A, the cluster's central galaxy.

== Characteristics ==
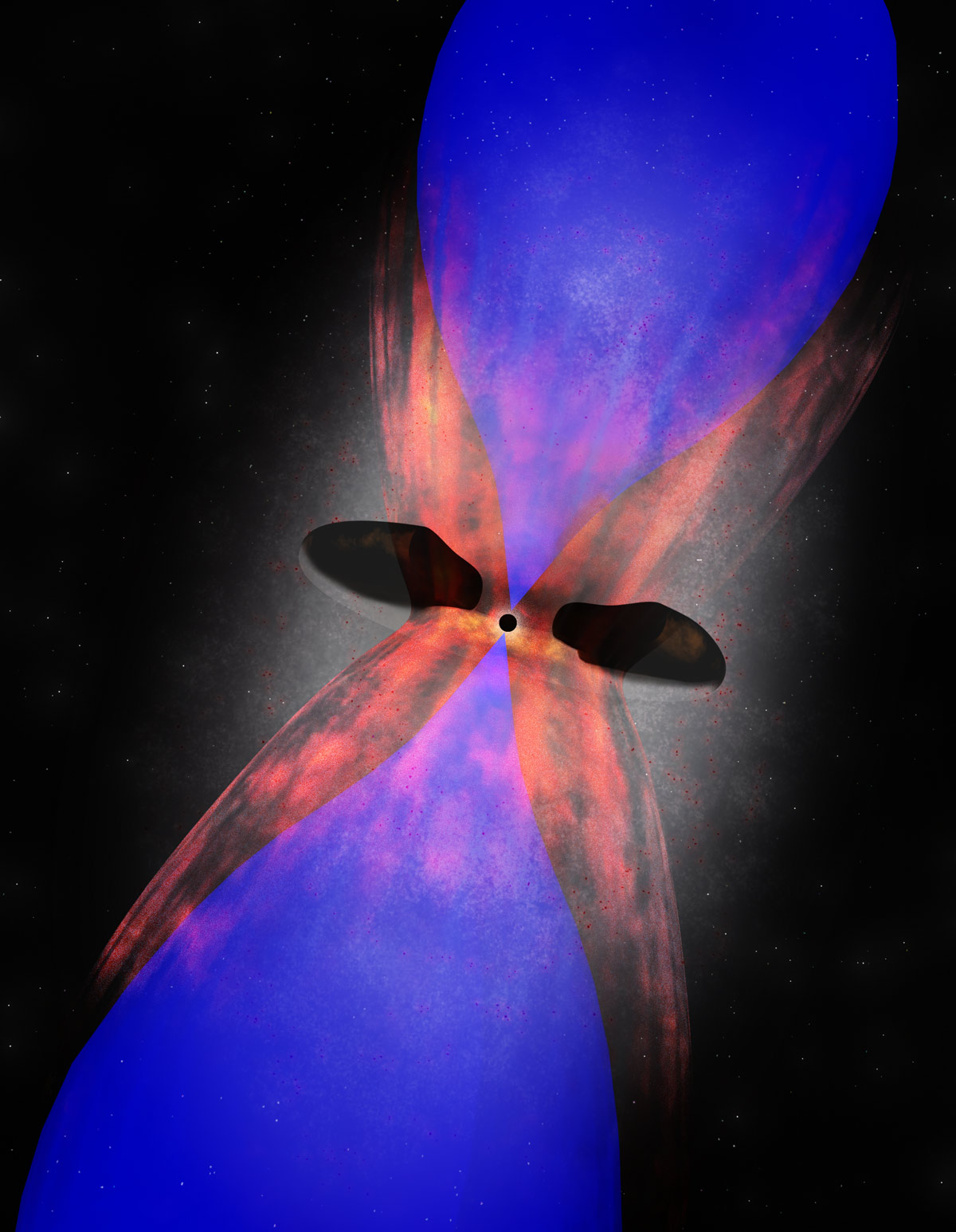
Artist's depiction of the center of the Phoenix Cluster, showing the central black hole and its accretion disc that fuels two powerful jets emanating from the nucleus

Owing to its extreme properties, the Phoenix Cluster has been extensively studied and is considered one of the most important class of objects of its type. A multiwavelength observational study by M. McDonald and colleagues show that it has an extremely strong cooling flow rate (roughly 3,280 M_{☉} per annum), described as a runaway cooling flow. This measurement is one of the highest ever seen in the middle of a galaxy cluster. The very strong cooling flow, in contrast to other galaxy clusters, has been a suggested result of the feedback mechanism to prevent a runaway cooling flow which may not be established yet in the Phoenix Cluster; the heating mechanism expected to be produced by the central black hole being inadequate to create a feedback (in contrast to the Perseus and Virgo clusters). This is further supported by the high starburst activity of the central galaxy Phoenix A, where stars are formed at 740 M_{☉} per annum (compared to the Milky Way's 1 M_{☉} per annum of star production); the central active galactic nucleus attested to not have been producing sufficient energy to ionize the galaxy's gas and prevent starburst activity.

The cluster has the highest X-ray luminosity compared to other clusters.

== Components ==
=== Central galaxy ===
Phoenix A
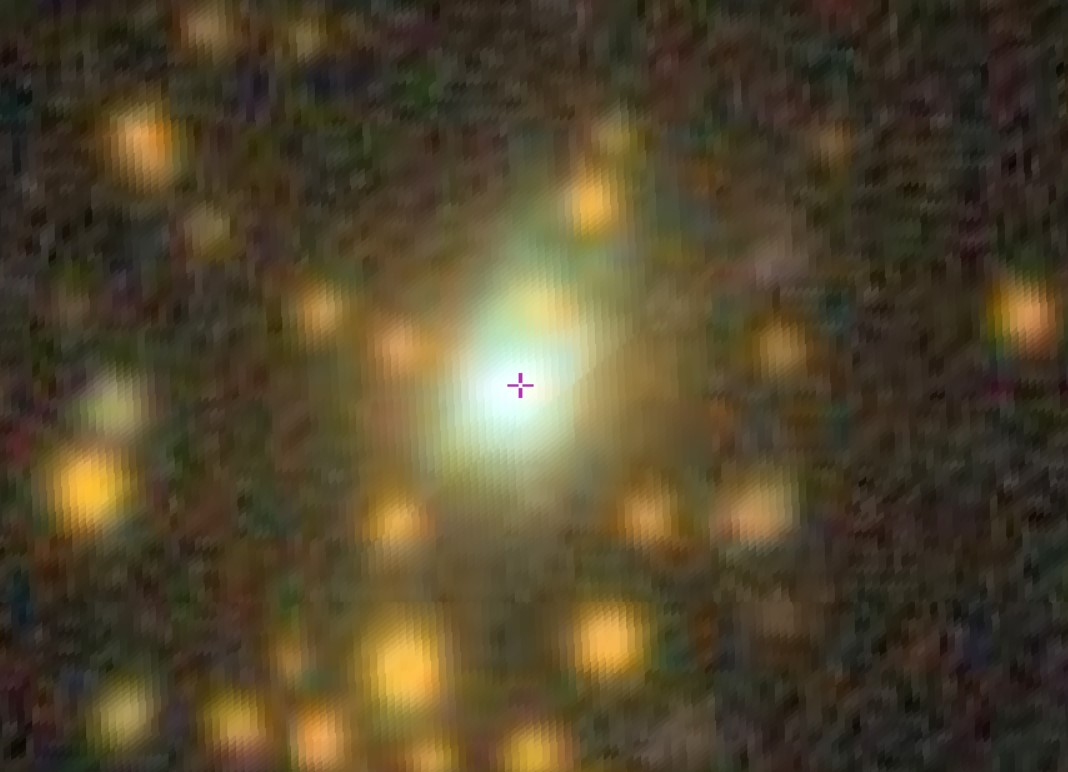

Observation data (J2000.0 epoch)
- Right ascension: 23^{h} 44^{m} 43.89^{s}
- Declination: −42° 43′ 12.4″
- Redshift: 0.597
- Heliocentric radial velocity: 179,072 km/s
- Apparent magnitude (V): 18.80

Characteristics
- Size: 110.48 kiloparsecs (360,300 light-years) (diameter; 2MASS K-band total isophote)

Other designations
- RBS 2043, 2MASX J23444387-4243124, MRSS 292-067217, 2CXO J234443.9-424312, LEDA 3988894

The central elliptical cD galaxy of this cluster, Phoenix A (RBS 2043, 2MASX J23444387-4243124), hosts an active galactic nucleus that has been described as sharing both the properties of being a quasar and a type 2 Seyfert galaxy, which is powered by a central supermassive black hole. The galaxy has an uncertain morphology. Based on the "total" aperture at the K-band, Phoenix A has an angular diameter of 16.20 arcseconds, corresponding to a large isophotal diameter of 110.48 kiloparsecs (360,300 light-years), making it one of the largest known galaxies discovered from Earth.

Phoenix A also contains vast amounts of hot gas. More normal matter is present there than the total of all the other galaxies in the cluster. Data from observations indicate that hot gas is cooling in the central regions at a rate of 3,820 M_{☉}/yr, the highest ever recorded.

It is also undergoing a massive starburst, the highest recorded in the middle of a galaxy cluster, although other galaxies at higher redshifts have a higher starburst rate.

Size comparison of the event horizons of the black holes of TON 618 and Phoenix A. The orbit of Neptune (white oval) is included for comparison.

Observations by a variety of telescopes including the GALEX and Herschel space telescopes shows that it has been converting the material to stars at an exceptionally high rate of 740 M_{☉} per year. This is considerably higher than that of NGC 1275 A, the central galaxy of the Perseus Cluster, where stars are formed at a rate around 20 times lower, or the one per year rate of star formation in the Milky Way.

=== Supermassive black hole ===
The supermassive black hole in the center of the Phoenix Cluster is the engine that drives both the Seyfert nucleus of Phoenix A, as well as the relativistic jets that produce the inner cavities in the cluster center. M. Brockamp and colleagues had used a modelling of the innermost stellar density of the central galaxy and the adiabatic process that fuels the growth of its central black hole to create a calorimetric tool to measure the black hole's mass. The team deduced an energy conversion parameter and related it to the behavior of the hot intracluster gas, the AGN feedback parameter, and the dynamics and density profiles of the galaxy to create an evolutionary modelling of how the central black hole may have grown in the past. In the case of Phoenix A, it has been shown to have far more extreme characteristics, with adiabatic models near the theoretical limitations.

These models, as suggested by the paper, are indicative of a central black hole with estimated mass on the order of 100 billion M_{☉}, possibly even exceeding this mass, though the black hole's mass itself has not yet been measured through orbital mechanics. Such a high mass makes it potentially the most massive black hole known in the observable universe. A black hole of this mass has:

- 24,100 times the mass of the black hole at the center of the Milky Way (Sagittarius A*)
- Twice the mass of the Triangulum Galaxy, including its dark matter halo.
- Assuming it is a non-rotating black hole, an immense event horizon with the Schwarzschild radius of 295.25 billion kilometres (2,000 astronomical units; 0.031 light-years), 50 times the distance from the Sun to Pluto (or if placed where the Sun is it could reach the inner limit of the Oort Cloud).
- A circumference that would take 71 days and 14 hours to travel at light speed.

Such a high mass may place it into a proposed category of stupendously large black holes (SLABs), black holes that may have been seeded by primordial black holes with masses that may reach 100 billion M_{☉} or more, larger than the upper maximum limit for at least luminous accreting black holes hosted by disc galaxies of about 50 billion M_{☉}.

== JWST observations ==
In 2025, NASA's James Webb Space Telescope (JWST) revealed a key missing link in the Phoenix Cluster's rapid star formation. Using mid-infrared spectroscopy, Webb detected an intermediate-temperature cooling gas (~300,000 Kelvin) that bridges the gap between the cluster's hot gas (10 million Kelvin) and cool gas (10,000 Kelvin)—a phenomenon unseen in other galaxy clusters.
