= NGC 1281 =

Galaxy in the constellation Perseus

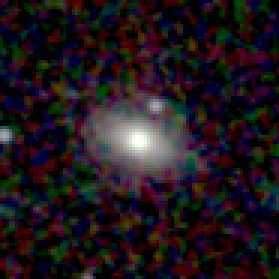
- A near-infrared image of NGC 1281.

Observation data (J2000 epoch)
- Constellation: Perseus
- Right ascension: 03^{h} 20^{m} 06.1^{s}
- Declination: 41° 37′ 48″
- Redshift: 0.014343
- Heliocentric radial velocity: 4300 km/s
- Distance: 195.7 ± 3.3 Mly (60 ± 1 Mpc)
- Group or cluster: Perseus Cluster
- Apparent magnitude (V): 14.5

Characteristics
- Type: E5
- Mass/Light ratio: 1.7 M_{☉}/L_{☉}
- Size: ~17,000 ly (5.2 kpc) (estimated)
- Apparent size (V): 1.0 x 0.7
- Half-light radius (physical): ~4,200 ly (1.3 kpc) (estimated)

Other designations
- CGCG 540-108, MCG 7-7-67, PGC 12458

NGC 1281 is a compact elliptical galaxy located about 200 million light-years away in the constellation Perseus. NGC 1281 was discovered by astronomer John Dreyer on December 12, 1876. It is a member of the Perseus Cluster.

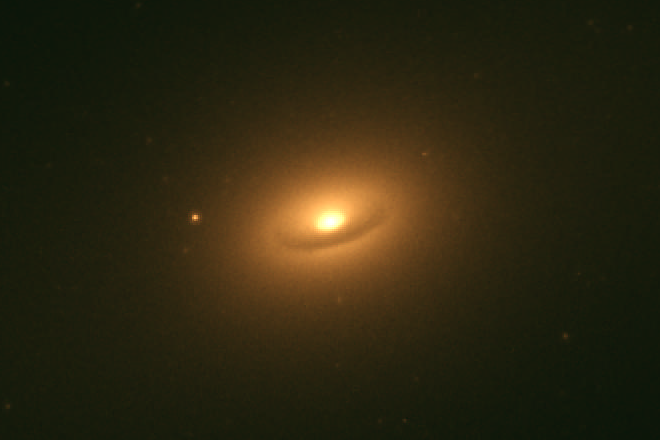

Like NGC 1277 and NGC 1271, NGC 1281 is a candidate "relic galaxy".

== Supermassive black hole ==
The supermassive black hole in NGC 1281 has an estimated mass of about 10 billion solar masses (10^{10} M☉). However, Anna Ferré-Mateu et al. estimated the black hole has a mass of no more than 5 billion solar masses.

== See also ==
- List of NGC objects (1001–2000)
- NGC 1271
- NGC 1277

== Notes ==
1.This value was determined by using the given half-light radius.
