= NGC 4325 =

Elliptical galaxy in the constellation Virgo

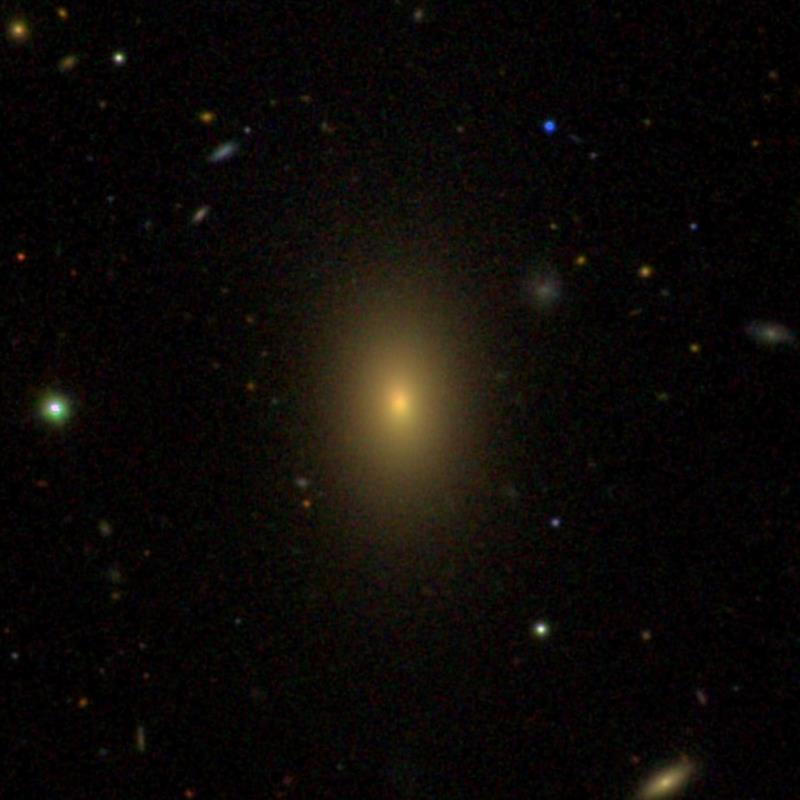
- SDSS image of NGC 4325.

Observation data (J2000 epoch)
- Constellation: Virgo
- Right ascension: 12^{h} 23^{m} 06.7^{s}
- Declination: 10° 37′ 16″
- Redshift: 0.025489
- Heliocentric radial velocity: 7641 km/s
- Distance: 330 Mly (102 Mpc)
- Group or cluster: NGC 4325 Group
- Apparent magnitude (V): 14.2
- Absolute magnitude (V): -22.12

Characteristics
- Type: E4
- Mass: 1.31×10^{11} (Stellar mass)/9×10^{12} (Total Mass) M_{☉}
- Size: ~133,900 ly (41.05 kpc) (estimated)
- Apparent size (V): 1.25 x 0.80

Other designations
- NGC 4368, VCC 0616, CGCG 070-037, MCG +02-32-019, PGC 040183

NGC 4325 is an elliptical galaxy located about 330 million light-years away in the constellation Virgo. It was discovered by astronomer Heinrich d'Arrest on April 15, 1865, who described it as "vF, vS, iR, nf of 2". Despite being listed in the Virgo Cluster catalog as VCC 616, it is not a member of the Virgo Cluster but instead a background galaxy.

== Physical characteristics ==
NGC 4325 exhibits star formation, with dust being observed in the galaxy. The galaxy has a radio luminosity of 32.2 × 10^{37} ergs, with a star formation rate of around 0.66 solar masses per year.

NGC 4325, contains several distinct, radial filaments with a complex morphology that strongly resembles NGC 1275 which lies in the core of the Perseus cluster. However unlike NGC 1275, NGC 4325 is almost completely isolated and the total X-ray mass of the NGC 4325 Group which NGC 4325 is the dominant galaxy is an order of magnitude lower.

=== AGN activity ===
Observations by the ROSAT and Chandra X-ray space telescopes reveal that a result of past AGN activity in NGC 4325, there exist X-ray cavities in the ICM of the NGC 4325 Group. These two small X-ray cavities with a diameter of around 16,000 ly (5 kpc), which are hard to see in raw X-ray images due to their small size and lie to the east and west of NGC 4325. These cavities, although they might suggest a recent AGN outburst, don't have any corresponding radio emission which suggests that time has elapsed long enough to allow the radio lobes to fade. Also, instead of a large AGN outburst occurring in the past, the gas in the NGC 4325 Group seems to have cooled down in a short period of around of 50 million years after a small AGN outburst. This suggests that NGC 4325 is in a pre-outburst stage and that the rapid cooling of the gas will trigger another outburst within 50 million years.

In the core of the NGC 4325 Group encompassed by NGC 4325 at the south eastern edge of the galaxy approximately at a distance of 23,000 ly (7 kpc) there is an asymmetrical region of cool gas, with a temperature between 0.6 and 0.7 keV. This cool gas is aligned to the north-west through the south-east, appears to coincide with some of the brightest X-ray features within the group centre and extends a further 98,000 ly (30 kpc) from the center of the group. At a distance of approximately 20 kpc from the group centre, the gas distribution becomes much more spherically symmetric. This region of cool gas also corresponds to a region of excess emissions in X-rays. This region is displaced from the center of the group and is thought to have been displaced from the center of the group by either a merger or by AGN activity. With the first explanation, NGC 4325 is slightly displaced by around 9,800 ly (3 kpc) from the centre of the group emission which suggests a merger might have taken place. Alternately, the two small X-ray cavities provide evidence of a past AGN outburst. It is thought that a weak AGN outburst between 10 and 100 million ago injected energy in the IGM, which generated the small cavities and displaced the displaced cool gas from the core of the group, which is now settling back down to the centre. The region of cool gas lies between the two bubbles, and may have been created by gas displaced by the X-ray cavities as they expanded.

There is also a metal-rich elongated filament structure in the core of the NGC 4325 Group that is thought to have formed from the AGN outburst from the core of NGC 4325 with the metal enrichment of the filament coming from a galactic wind.

=== Supermassive Black Hole ===
NGC 4325 contains a supermassive black hole with an estimated mass of 9.8×10^{8} solar masses.

== Nearby Galaxies ==
NGC 4325 is a member of the NGC 4325 Group, which is part of the Coma Supercluster. The NGC 4325 Group contains 28 confirmed members including NGC 4320 which is a peculiar galaxy. The NGC 4325 Group has a velocity dispersion of around 298 km and a mass of 3.2×10^{13} solar masses. The presence of a metal-rich elongated filament structure in the core of the NGC 4325 along several other structures in the group including a secondary ring-like structure at a distance of 1,600,000 ly (0.5 Mpc) from the center of the group suggest that the NGC 4325 Group is dynamically young and will evolve over time though galaxy mergers.

== See also ==
- List of NGC objects (4001–5000)
- NGC 1275
- NGC 4320
