= NGC 1293 =

Galaxy in the constellation Perseus

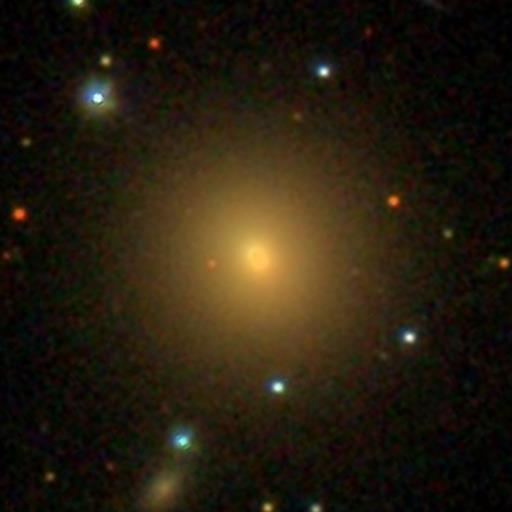
- SDSS image of NGC 1293.

Observation data (J2000 epoch)
- Constellation: Perseus
- Right ascension: 03^{h} 21^{m} 36.4^{s}
- Declination: 41° 23′ 34″
- Redshift: 0.013920
- Heliocentric radial velocity: 4173 km/s
- Distance: 215 Mly (65.8 Mpc)
- Group or cluster: Perseus Cluster
- Apparent magnitude (V): 14.50

Characteristics
- Type: E0
- Size: ~123,000 ly (37.8 kpc) (estimated)
- Apparent size (V): 1.0 x 1.0

Other designations
- CGCG 540-116, MCG +07-07-075, PGC 012597

NGC 1293 is an elliptical galaxy located about 215 million light-years away in the constellation Perseus. It was discovered by astronomer William Herschel on October 17, 1786. NGC 1293 is a member of the Perseus Cluster.

== See also ==
- List of NGC objects (1001–2000)
- NGC 1283
