= NGC 1294 =

Galaxy in the constellation Perseus

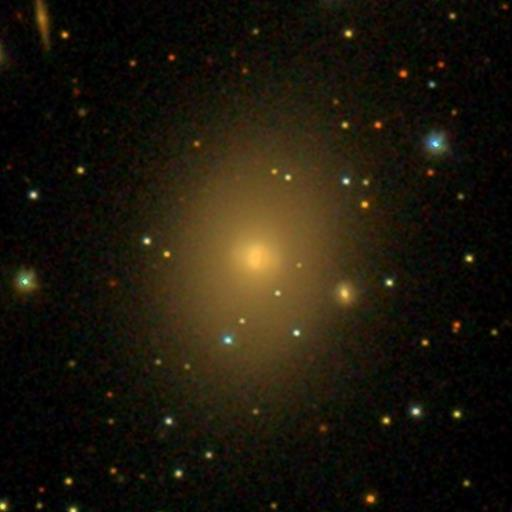
- SDSS image of NGC 1294.

Observation data (J2000 epoch)
- Constellation: Perseus
- Right ascension: 03^{h} 21^{m} 39.9^{s}
- Declination: 41° 21′ 38″
- Redshift: 0.021965
- Heliocentric radial velocity: 6585 km/s
- Distance: 286 Mly (87.7 Mpc)
- Group or cluster: Perseus Cluster
- Apparent magnitude (V): 14.3

Characteristics
- Type: SA0^-?
- Size: ~136,000 ly (41.8 kpc) (estimated)
- Apparent size (V): 1.3 x 1.1

Other designations
- UGC 2694, CGCG 540-117, MCG +07-07-076, PGC 12600

NGC 1294 is a lenticular galaxy located about 285 million light-years away in the constellation Perseus. The galaxy was discovered by astronomer William Herschel on October 17, 1786 and is a member of the Perseus Cluster.

== See also ==
- List of NGC objects (1001–2000)
- NGC 1250
