= NGC 1268 =

Spiral galaxy in the constellation Perseus

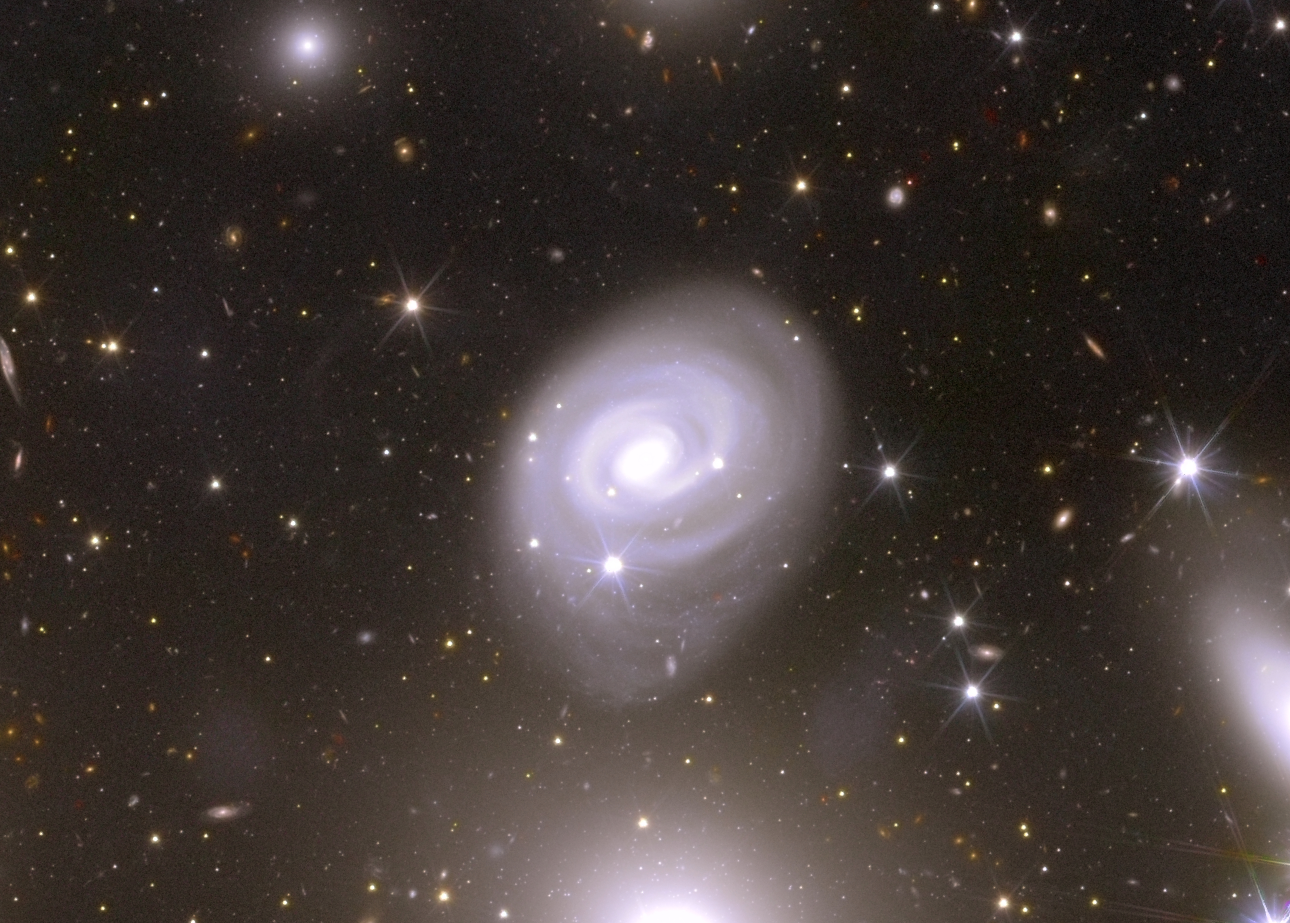
- NGC 1268 imaged by the Euclid Space Telescope

Observation data (J2000 epoch)
- Constellation: Perseus
- Right ascension: 03^{h} 18^{m} 45.1985^{s}
- Declination: +41° 29′ 19.300″
- Redshift: 0.010748±0.000007
- Heliocentric radial velocity: 3,222±2 km/s
- Distance: 147.3 ± 10.3 Mly (45.15 ± 3.17 Mpc)
- Group or cluster: Perseus Cluster
- Apparent magnitude (V): 14.2

Characteristics
- Type: SAB(rs)b
- Size: ~55,400 ly (16.98 kpc) (estimated)
- Apparent size (V): 1.0′ × 0.6′

Other designations
- UGC 2658, MCG +07-07-056, PGC 12332, CGCG 540-93

NGC 1268 is a spiral galaxy located about 147 million light-years away in the constellation Perseus. It was discovered by astronomer Heinrich d'Arrest on February 14, 1863. NGC 1268 is a member of the Perseus Cluster and appears to show signs of distortion in the form of bridges. These features may be the result of a strong interaction with NGC 1267.

== Supernova ==
One supernova has been observed in NGC 1268. SN 2008fg (Type Ia, mag. 18.8) was discovered by the Lick Observatory Supernova Search (LOSS) on August 30, 2008.

== See also ==
- List of NGC objects (1001–2000)
- Eyes Galaxies
- Mice Galaxies
