= NGC 1274 =

Galaxy in the constellation Perseus

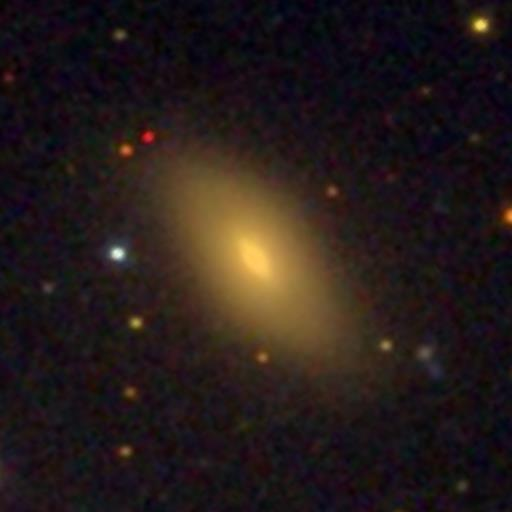
- SDSS image of NGC 1274

Observation data (J2000 epoch)
- Constellation: Perseus
- Right ascension: 03^{h} 19^{m} 40.5^{s}
- Declination: 41° 32′ 55″
- Redshift: 0.021391
- Heliocentric radial velocity: 6413 km/s
- Distance: 278 Mly (85.3 Mpc)
- Group or cluster: Perseus Cluster
- Apparent magnitude (V): 15.12

Characteristics
- Type: E3
- Size: ~51,200 ly (15.70 kpc) (estimated)
- Apparent size (V): 0.5 x 0.4

Other designations
- CGCG 540-102, MCG 7-7-62, PGC 12413

NGC 1274 is a compact elliptical galaxy located about 280 million light-years away in the constellation Perseus. NGC 1274 was discovered by astronomer Lawrence Parsons on December 4, 1875. It is a member of the Perseus Cluster.

== See also ==
- List of NGC objects (1001–2000)
