= Blue Nugget =

Distant galaxy that only existed in the early universe

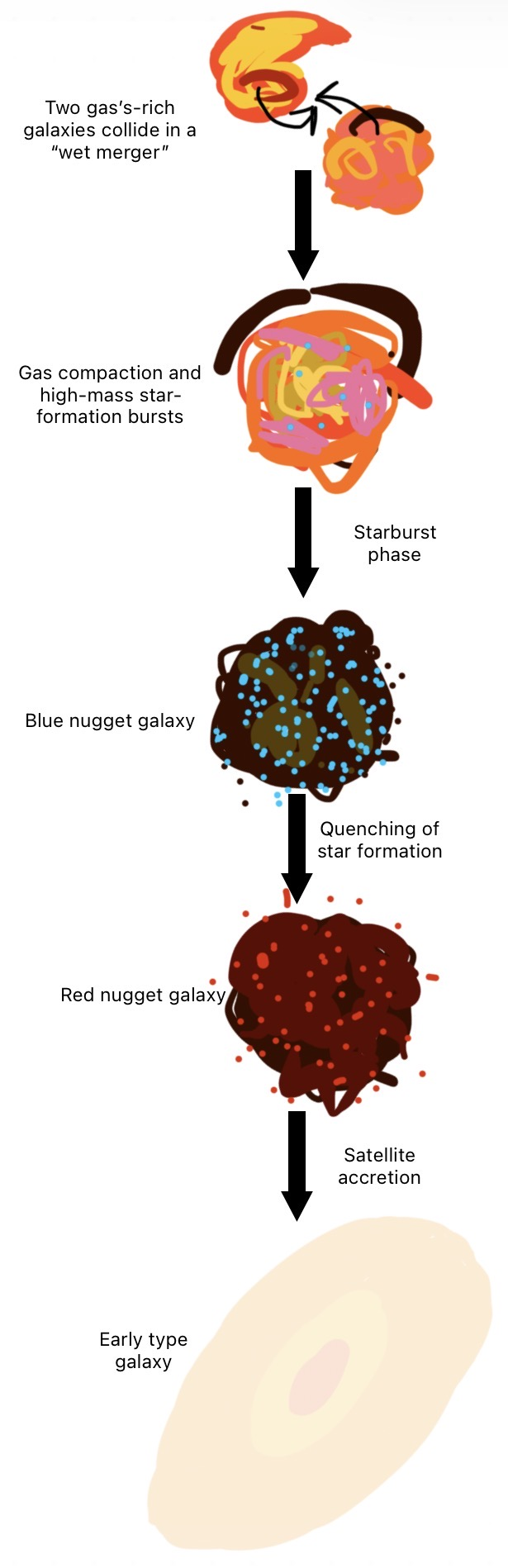
Diagram showing the evolution of a Blue nugget galaxy. (1) Two gas-rich galaxies merge in what is called a wet merger. (2) Gas within the galaxy now starts to collapse triggering a phase starburst forming many high-mass stars. (3) After, the galaxy is quenched turning into a red nugget galaxy. (4) After accretion, it turns into an early-type galaxy.

Blue Nugget (also called BN) galaxies are a type of distant galaxy that only existed in the early universe. Blue nugget galaxies are small and compact but high mass galaxies undergoing massive bursts of star formation which result in the formation of many large, bright blue stars. As their stellar population evolves and ages, blue nugget galaxies transition into red nugget galaxies.

The "Blue" derives from their blue coloration and "Nugget" derives from their small size.

== Evolution ==
Studies that use high-resolution cosmological simulations show that galaxies located at high-redshifts will tend to undergo a phase of gas compaction. This will usually trigger a phase of compact star formation forming a blue nugget. The process of compaction begins when the gas in a galaxy experiences a drastic loss in angular momentum often caused by wet galaxy mergers, counter-rotating cold streams of gas or violent instability in the galactic disk.

Then there will be a phase where star formation is suddenly quenched leading to the blue nugget transitioning into a red nugget (RN). This quenching is “inside-out” beginning at the center of the galaxy. Blue nuggets that are transitioning into a red nugget are called “Green nuggets”. Then from there, they will start to gradually grow and transform into the early-type galaxies, often elliptical, of the modern day Universe through the accretion of satellite galaxies.

== Examples ==
Examples of Blue Nugget galaxies can be found below:

- KIDS J122456+005048
- KiDSJ224546−295559 -post blue nugget
- KiDSJ234804-302855 -post blue nugget
- KiDS J023929−321129 -post blue nugget
- KiDSJ230226−335637 -post blue nugget
- KIDS J232940-340922 -post blue nugget
