= NGC 1250 =

Lenticular galaxy in the constellation Perseus

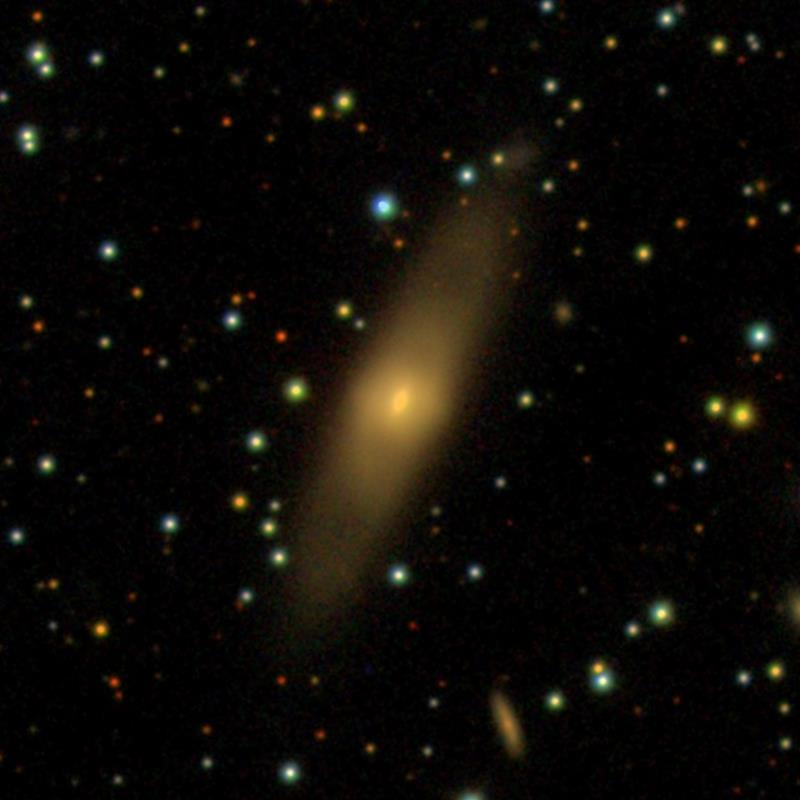
- SDSS image of NGC 1250.

Observation data (J2000 epoch)
- Constellation: Perseus
- Right ascension: 03^{h} 15^{m} 21.1^{s}
- Declination: 41° 21′ 20″
- Redshift: 0.020061
- Heliocentric radial velocity: 6014 km/s
- Distance: 276 Mly (84.5 Mpc)
- Group or cluster: Perseus Cluster
- Apparent magnitude (V): 13.96

Characteristics
- Type: S0^0
- Apparent size (V): 2.1 x 0.9

Other designations
- UGC 2613, MCG +07-07-040, PGC 12098

NGC 1250 is an edge-on lenticular galaxy located about 275 million light-years away in the constellation Perseus. It was discovered by astronomer Lewis Swift on Oct 21, 1886. NGC 1250 is a member of the Perseus Cluster.

== See also ==
- List of NGC objects (1001–2000)
- NGC 1277
