= Markarian 1073 =

Seyfert 2 galaxy in the constellation Perseus

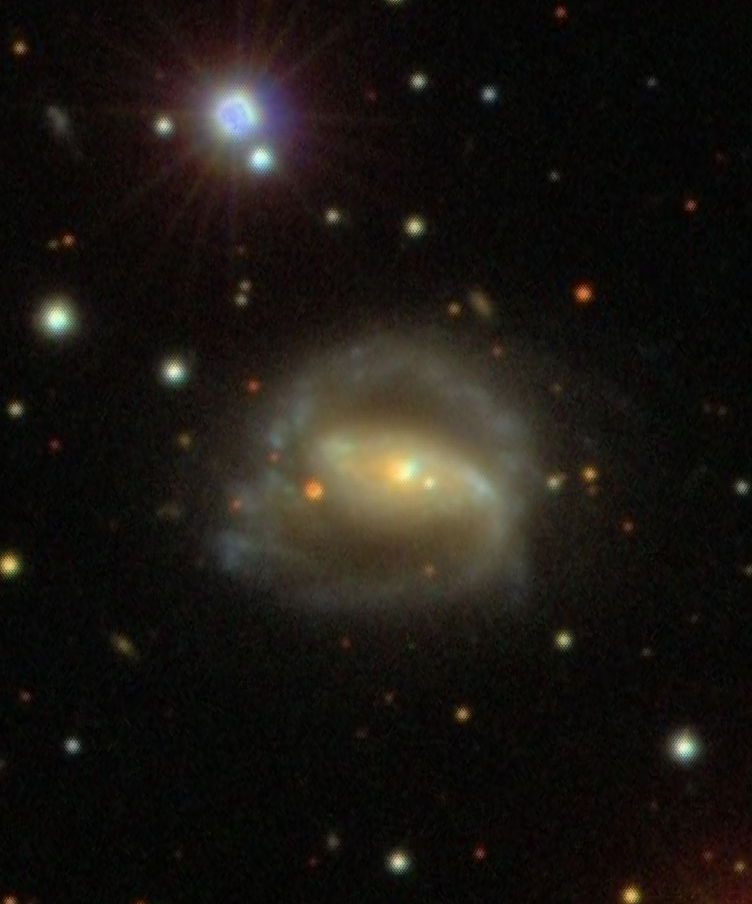
- SDSS image of Markarian 1073

Observation data (J2000 epoch)
- Constellation: Perseus
- Right ascension: 03^{h} 15^{m} 01.43^{s}
- Declination: +42° 02′ 08.86″
- Redshift: 0.023343
- Heliocentric radial velocity: 6,998 km/s ± 7
- Distance: 323 Mly
- Group or cluster: Perseus Cluster
- Apparent magnitude (V): 14.18

Characteristics
- Type: (R')SB(s)b;WR? Sy2
- Size: ~139,000 ly (42.5 kpc) (estimated)

Other designations
- UGC 2608, CGCG 540-064, IRAS 03117+4151, MCG +07-07-037, NSA 068683, PGC 12081

Markarian 1073 is a type 2 Seyfert galaxy located in the constellation of Perseus. The redshift of the galaxy is estimated to be (z) 0.023 and it was first discovered in the Markarian survey by astronomers in April 1979. The galaxy is classified to be a member of the Perseus Cluster (Abell 426), where it is located 0.85° from the cluster center.

== Description ==
Markarian 1073 is a Seyfert 2 galaxy. It is described as a type SB(s)b barred spiral galaxy. Its central nucleus is found to have a bright appearance based on optical imaging. There is a bar feature present, which is surrounded by an irregular ring that displays hydrogen-alpha knots towards both north and east, as well as outer fainter filaments located northwest. The inner region of the bar shows a prominent two-armed spiral arm structure.

The optical spectrum of the galaxy is mainly characterized by narrow and strong emission lines that are slightly blue in color, with full width at half maximum velocities of 250 kilometers per second. There is also a line-emitting region that is located four arcseconds away from the central nucleus. There is little evidence that confirms if the galaxy contains a broad line region or not.

Extended radio emission has also been detected in the galaxy's disk with the total diameter being around 1.1 kiloparsecs. The nuclear spectrum of the galaxy is main characterized by a silicate feature displaying moderate absorption, with further traces of weak polycyclic aromatic hydrocarbon (PAH) emission. This emission has also been detected from its nucleus to around 400 and 300 parsecs away, suggesting the galaxy underwent star formation activity. The star formation activity of the galaxy is estimated to be around 33 M_{☉} per year in the range between 6.5 and 69.
