= NGC 1264 =

Galaxy in the constellation Perseus

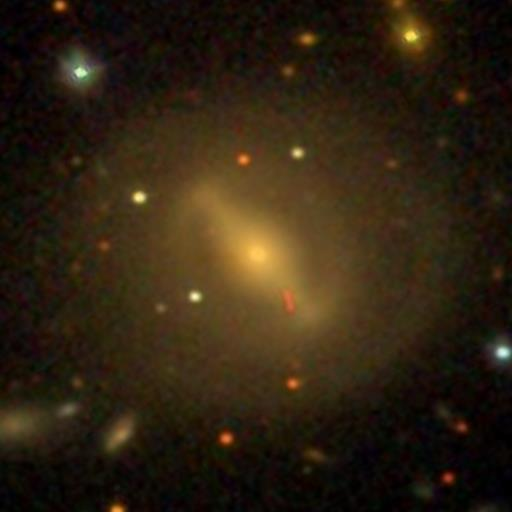
- SDSS image of NGC 1264.

Observation data (J2000 epoch)
- Constellation: Perseus
- Right ascension: 03^{h} 17^{m} 59.6^{s}
- Declination: 41° 31′ 13″
- Redshift: 0.010827
- Heliocentric radial velocity: 3246 km/s
- Distance: 146 Mly (44.7 Mpc)
- Group or cluster: Perseus Cluster
- Apparent magnitude (V): 16.0

Characteristics
- Type: SBab
- Size: ~50,300 ly (15.41 kpc) (estimated)
- Apparent size (V): 1.2 x 1.1

Other designations
- MCG 7-7-50, PGC 12270, UGC 2643

NGC 1264 is a low-surface-brightness barred spiral galaxy located about 145 million light-years away in the constellation Perseus. The galaxy was discovered by astronomer Guillaume Bigourdan on October 19, 1884. NGC 1264 is a member of the Perseus Cluster.

== See also ==
- List of NGC objects (1001–2000)
- Malin 1 - a giant low surface brightness spiral galaxy
