= NGC 1282 =

Galaxy in the constellation Perseus

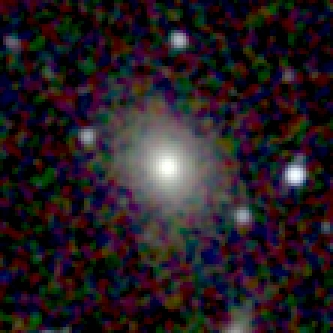
- A near-infrared image of NGC 1282.

Observation data (J2000 epoch)
- Constellation: Perseus
- Right ascension: 03^{h} 20^{m} 12.1^{s}
- Declination: 41° 22′ 01″
- Redshift: 0.007135
- Heliocentric radial velocity: 2,139 km/s
- Distance: 230 Mly (70 Mpc)
- Group or cluster: Perseus Cluster
- Apparent magnitude (V): 13.87

Characteristics
- Type: E
- Size: ~115,000 ly (35.3 kpc) (estimated)
- Apparent size (V): 1.4 x 1.1

Other designations
- CGCG 540-109, MCG 7-7-68, PGC 12471, UGC 2675

NGC 1282 is an elliptical galaxy located about 230 million light-years away in the constellation Perseus. It was discovered by astronomer Guillaume Bigourdan on October 23, 1884. NGC 1282 is a member of the Perseus Cluster.

A Type Ia supernova designated as SN 2008fh was detected near NGC 1282 on either July 30, or August 30, 2008. However, the supernova was not associated with the galaxy.

== See also ==
- List of NGC objects (1001–2000)
