= NGC 1283 =

Galaxy in the constellation Perseus

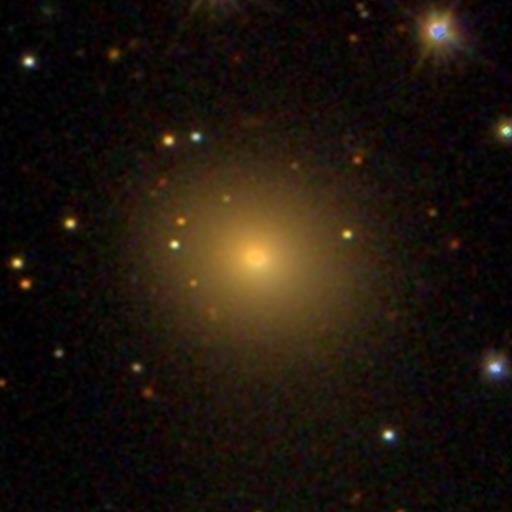
- SDSS image of NGC 1283.

Observation data (J2000 epoch)
- Constellation: Perseus
- Right ascension: 03^{h} 20^{m} 15.5^{s}
- Declination: 41° 23′ 55″
- Redshift: 0.022439
- Heliocentric radial velocity: 6727 km/s
- Distance: 250 Mly (76.6 Mpc)
- Group or cluster: Perseus Cluster
- Apparent magnitude (V): 14.73

Characteristics
- Type: E1
- Size: ~90,000 ly (27.5 kpc) (estimated)
- Apparent size (V): 0.7 x 0.6

Other designations
- CGCG 540-110, MCG 7-7-69, PGC 12478, UGC 2676

NGC 1283 is an elliptical galaxy located about 250 million light-years away in the constellation Perseus. The galaxy was discovered by astronomer Guillaume Bigourdan on October 23, 1884 and is a member of the Perseus Cluster. It also contains an active galactic nucleus.

== See also ==
- List of NGC objects (1001–2000)
