= NGC 1271 =

Galaxy in the constellation Perseus

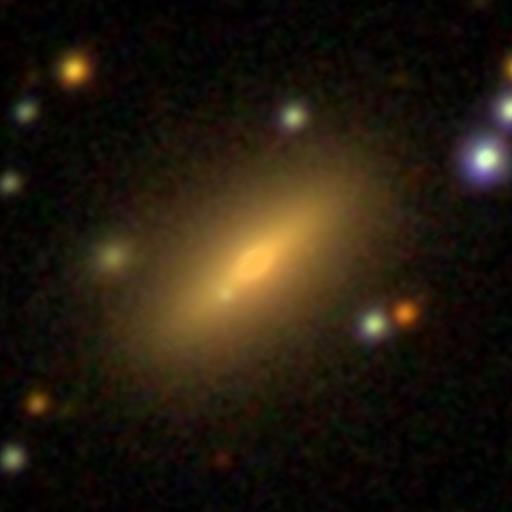
- SDSS image of NGC 1271

Observation data (J2000 epoch)
- Constellation: Perseus
- Right ascension: 03^{h} 19^{m} 11.3^{s}
- Declination: 41° 21′ 12″
- Redshift: 0.019183
- Heliocentric radial velocity: 5751 km/s
- Distance: 249 Mly (76.3 Mpc)
- Group or cluster: Perseus Cluster
- Apparent magnitude (V): 15.1

Characteristics
- Type: E/SO
- Mass/Light ratio: 1.35 M_{☉}/L_{☉}
- Size: ~14,000 ly (4.4 kpc) (estimated)
- Apparent size (V): 0.567 x 0.306

Other designations
- CGCG 540-96, PGC 12367

NGC 1271 is a compact elliptical or lenticular galaxy located about 250 million light-years away in the constellation Perseus. The galaxy was discovered by astronomer Guillaume Bigourdan on November 14, 1884. NGC 1271 is a member of the Perseus Cluster and has a nuclear dust disk in its center. It also has an edge-on, intermediate-scale disk and has a central bulge. Like NGC 1277, NGC 1271 is a candidate "relic galaxy".

== Supermassive black hole ==
Using orbital-based stellar dynamical models, Walsh et al. determined that the supermassive black hole in the center of NGC 1271 has a mass of 3.0+1.0
−1.1×10^{9} M_{☉}.

== See also ==
- List of NGC objects (1001–2000)
- NGC 1277
