= KIDS J232940−34092 =

Galaxy in the constellation Pisces

Observation data (J2000 epoch)
- Constellation: Pisces
- Right ascension: 23^{h} 29^{m} 40.261^{s}
- Declination: −34° 09′ 22.95″
- Distance: 5.2 billion light years

Characteristics
- Type: Post-Blue Nugget

KIDS J232940−34092 is a massive quadruple lens compact post-blue nugget type galaxy that is located at Redshift 0.38, meaning it is located about 5.2 billion light years from Earth. It has an Einstein cross effect, an effect where light from a distant galaxy comes across a region of spacetime that is warped (gravitational lensed) by a massive galaxy in the lights path. It was discovered along with KIDS J122456+005048, another blue nugget galaxy with a Einstein cross.

The galaxy has a evolved stellar population of very little stellar formation. This was discovered due to the galaxy's prominent absorption features.
