= NGC 4320 =

Peculiar galaxy in the constellation Virgo

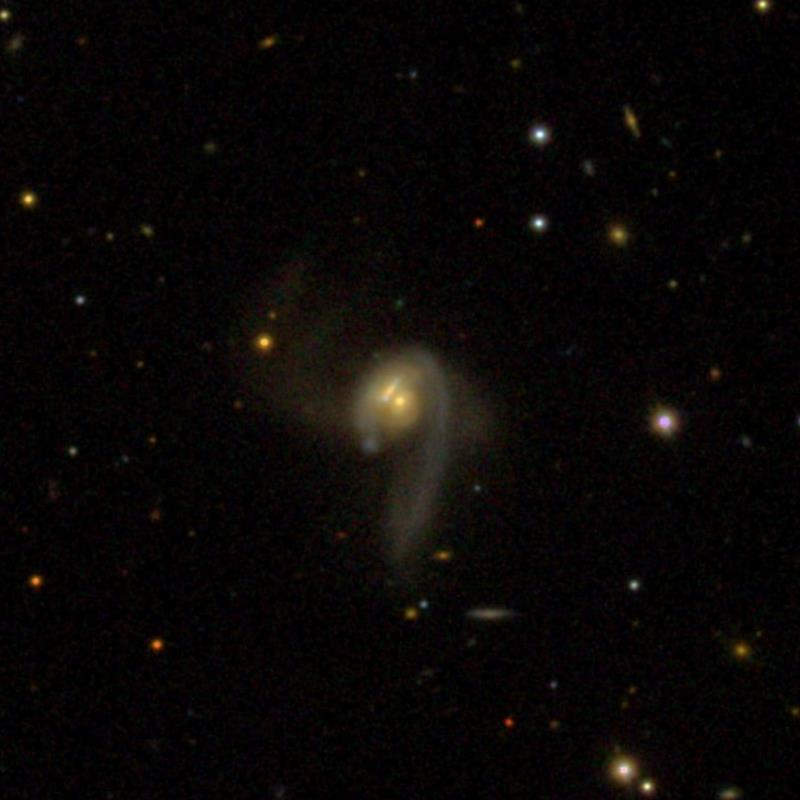
- SDSS image of NGC 4320.

Observation data (J2000 epoch)
- Constellation: Virgo
- Right ascension: 12^{h} 22^{m} 57.7^{s}
- Declination: 10° 32′ 54″
- Redshift: 0.026675
- Heliocentric radial velocity: 7997 km/s
- Distance: 370 Mly (114 Mpc)
- Group or cluster: NGC 4325 Group
- Apparent magnitude (V): 15.3

Characteristics
- Type: S? pec
- Size: ~120,000 ly (38 kpc) (estimated)
- Apparent size (V): 0.70 x 0.53

Other designations
- UGC 07452, VCC 0599, PGC 040160, MCG +02-32-018

NGC 4320, is a peculiar galaxy located about 370 million light-years away in the constellation Virgo. It was discovered by astronomer Heinrich d'Arrest on April 15, 1865 and is a member of the NGC 4325 Group.

NGC 4320 appears to be the end result of an interaction and merger of two spiral galaxies.

== See also ==
- List of NGC objects (4001–5000)
- Antennae Galaxies
- Mice Galaxies
