= NGC 1273 =

Galaxy in the constellation Perseus

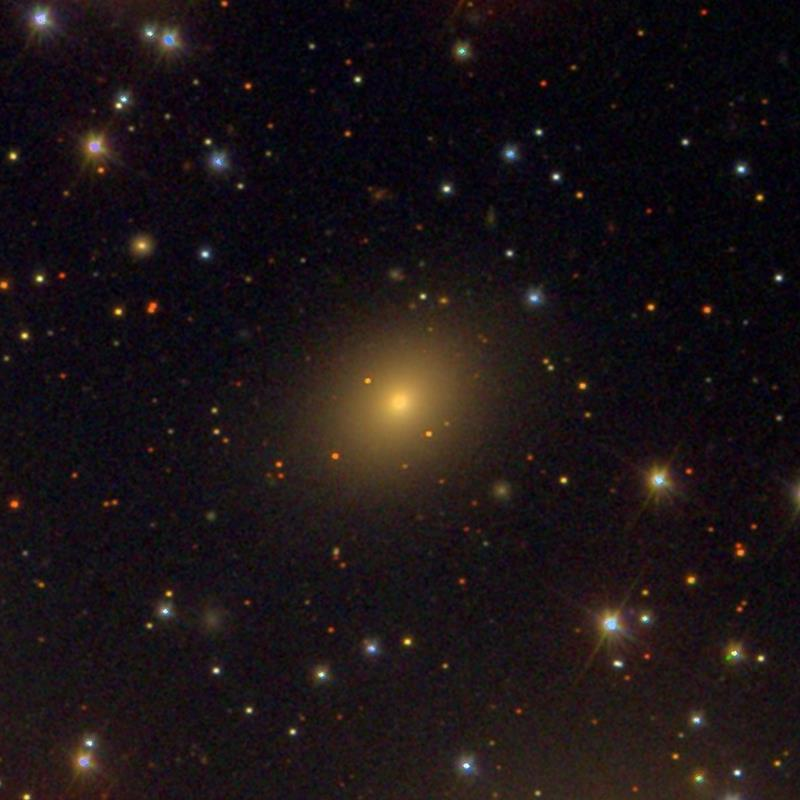
- SDSS image of NGC 1273.

Observation data (J2000 epoch)
- Constellation: Perseus
- Right ascension: 03^{h} 19^{m} 26.7^{s}
- Declination: 41° 32′ 26″
- Redshift: 0.017969
- Heliocentric radial velocity: 5387 km/s
- Distance: 246 Mly (75.4 Mpc)
- Group or cluster: Perseus Cluster
- Apparent magnitude (V): 14.27

Characteristics
- Type: SA0^0(r)?
- Size: ~95,000 ly (29 kpc) (estimated)
- Apparent size (V): 1.1 x 1.1

Other designations
- CGCG 540-99, MCG 7-7-59, PGC 12396

NGC 1273 is a lenticular galaxy located about 245 million light-years away in the constellation Perseus. It was discovered by astronomer Heinrich d'Arrest on February 14, 1863 and is a member of the Perseus Cluster.

== See also ==
- List of NGC objects (1001–2000)
