= Red nugget =

Unusually small galaxies with large red stars

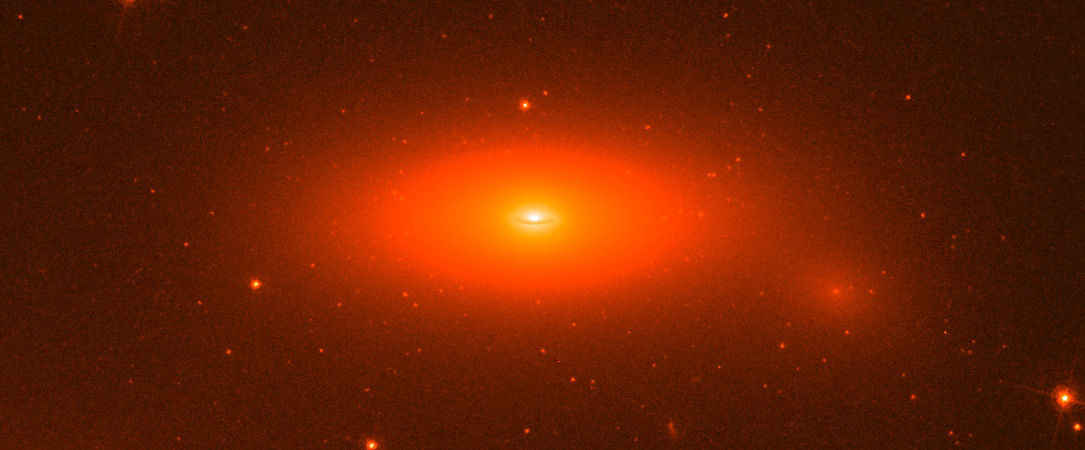
Red nugget galaxy NGC 1277

Red nuggets is the nickname given to rare, unusually small galaxies packed with large amounts of red stars where star formation has been quenched. Although typically studied in the distant, high-redshift universe, "red nuggets" were first observed locally, having been flagged as "compact galaxies" in the catalogs of Fritz Zwicky and collaborators. They were observed in greater numbers by the Hubble Space Telescope in 2005. They are ancient remnants of the first massive galaxies and are more likely to be found at higher redshifts. The environments of red nuggets are usually consistent with the general elliptical galaxy population. Most red nuggets have merged with other galaxies, but some managed to stay unscathed. The most studied red nugget galaxy is NGC 1277.

== Naming ==
Red nuggets are not only nicknamed for their size and color, but also for how precious the discovery is to astronomers as it challenged current theories regarding galaxy formation at the time the term was coined.

== Formation of red nuggets ==
Red nuggets are galaxies that have stopped forming new stars. Some have not undergone any sort of merger throughout their lifetime and are therefore considered "naked". These red nugget galaxies come from galaxies, which were still forming new stars, that have since been quenched. There are a few theories for what could quench these young galaxies and form red nuggets. One is that red nuggets are formed from massive black holes. Once the black hole gets massive enough, it releases a large amount of energy. If it releases enough, the galaxies are quenched and depart from the main sequence of star formation, which stops the formation of new young stars within the galaxy, eventually forming red nuggets. Another theory says that red nuggets are young elliptical galaxies and form into more massive elliptical galaxies after undergoing a galaxy merger.

Galaxies with more mass quench earlier than galaxies with low amounts of mass because galaxies with low amounts of mass try to quench several times. The compaction happens due to a fierce period of inflow involving (mostly small) mergers and counter-rotating streams or recycled gas. It is also frequently associated with extreme disc instability. The quenching happens because of the extremely high star formation rate (SFR), stellar and supernova feedback, and possibly also active galactic nuclei feedback due to the high gas density in the center of the red nugget.

An alternative evolutionary pathway is that some red nuggets may now be the spheroidal "bulge" component of local lenticular galaxies that acquired two-dimensional stellar disks over cosmic time. Observational searches in the nearby universe indicate that compact, massive bulges are abundant, but are typically "hidden" inside a larger stellar disk. Consequently, their presence is only revealed when performing detailed bulge-disk decompositions of the galaxy's light. Furthermore, high-redshift surveys may sometimes miss the fainter disks of distant galaxies due to depth limitations and cosmological surface brightness dimming, recovering only the brighter compact structures. Spectrophotometric analyses of massive disk galaxies suggest that approximately 85% assembled "inside-out," developing their stellar disks around pre-existing compact cores. About one-third of these bulges are older, highly compact structures that formed rapidly at z ∼ 6, indicating they are ancient spheroidal relics that spent several billion years as "naked" red nuggets before gradually acquiring their surrounding disks.

== Star formation ==
Data from NASA's Chandra X-Ray Observatory observing the red nuggets Mrk 1216 and PGC 032673 has shown that the central black holes suppress star formation in red nuggets with their heat and feed on the gas surrounding them. This brings up the intriguing question on how they could possibly be packed so densely with stars. Results show that red nuggets may have untapped stellar "fuel" to produce their unusually large number of stars.

== Discovery of red nugget galaxies ==
A team led by Ivana Damjanov found over 600 red nugget candidates in the Sloan Digital Sky Survey (SDSS) database, of which 9 were confirmed as red nuggets. These red nuggets have been missed so long because, due to their extremely small size, they look like stars in pictures. But their spectra shows what they really are. Damjanov expressed how truly amazing the discovery was when she said, "Looking for 'red nuggets' in the Sloan Digital Sky Survey was like panning a riverbed, washing away silt and mud to uncover bits of gold".

Before Damjanov and her team had thought to look through the immense database of the SDSS, no one could find the elusive galaxies after their original discovery in 2005.

== See also ==
- List of galaxies
- List of nearest galaxies
- List of spiral galaxies
- NGC 1277
