= NGC 1279 =

Galaxy in the constellation Perseus

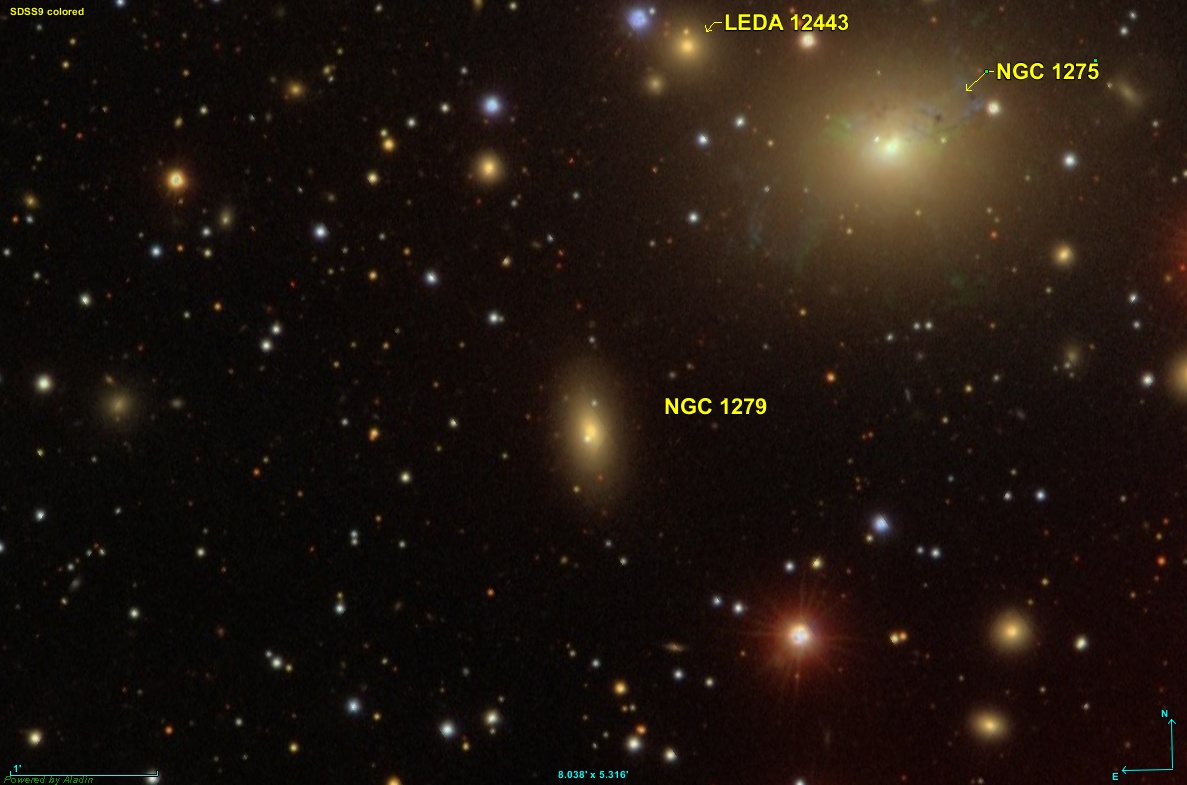
- SDSS image of NGC 1279.

Observation data (J2000 epoch)
- Constellation: Perseus
- Right ascension: 3^{h} 19^{m} 59.1^{s}
- Declination: 41° 28′ 46″
- Redshift: 0.024300
- Heliocentric radial velocity: 7285 km/s
- Distance: 317 Mly (97.1 Mpc)
- Group or cluster: Perseus Cluster
- Apparent magnitude (V): 15.5

Characteristics
- Type: S/S0?
- Size: ~113,400 ly (34.77 kpc) (estimated)
- Apparent size (V): 0.587 x 0.329

Other designations
- PGC 12448, PGC 12449, 2MASX J03195907+4128462

NGC 1279 is a lenticular galaxy estimated to be 324 million light-years away from the Milky Way in the constellation Perseus. It has diameter of about 110,000 ly, and is a member of the Perseus Cluster.

It was discovered on December 12, 1876, by astronomer John Louis Emil Dreyer.
