= Cooling flow =

Cooling of the intracluster medium in galaxy clusters

A cooling flow occurs when the intracluster medium (ICM) in the centres of galaxy clusters should be rapidly cooling at the rate of tens to thousands of solar masses per year. This should happen as the ICM (a plasma) is quickly losing its energy by the emission of X-rays. The X-ray brightness of the ICM is proportional to the square of its density, which rises steeply towards the centres of many clusters. Also the temperature falls to typically a third or a half of the temperature in the outskirts of the cluster. The typical [predicted] timescale for the ICM to cool is relatively short, less than a billion years. As material in the centre of the cluster cools out, the pressure of the overlying ICM should cause more material to flow inwards (the cooling flow).

In a steady state, the rate of mass deposition, i.e. the rate at which the plasma cools, is given by

$$\dot{M} = \frac{2}{5} \frac{L \mu m}{kT},$$

where L is the bolometric (i.e. over the entire spectrum) luminosity of the cooling region, T is its temperature, k is the Boltzmann constant and μm is the mean molecular mass.

== Cooling flow problem ==
It is currently thought that the very large amounts of expected cooling are in reality much smaller, as there is little evidence for cool X-ray emitting gas in many of these systems. This is the cooling flow problem. Theories for why there is little evidence of cooling include

- Heating by the central Active galactic nucleus (AGN) in clusters, possibly via sound waves (seen in the Perseus Cluster and Virgo Cluster)
- Thermal conduction of heat from the outer parts of clusters
- Cosmic ray heating
- Hiding cool gas by absorbing material
- Mixing of cool gas with hotter material

Heating by AGN is the most popular explanation, as they emit a lot of energy over their lifetimes, and some of the alternatives listed have theoretical problems.
