= NGC 1267 =

Galaxy in the constellation Perseus

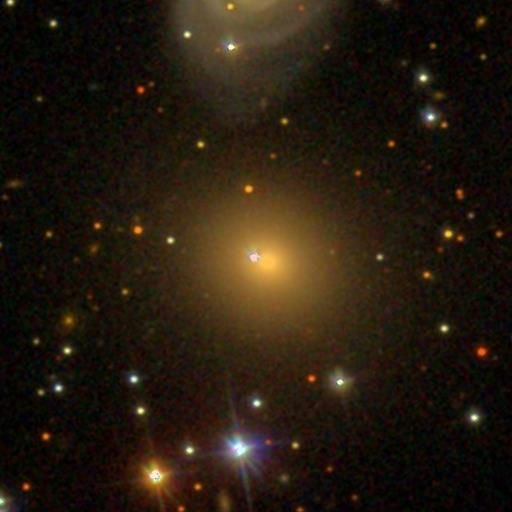
- SDSS image of NGC 1267. The spiral galaxy at the top of the image is NGC 1268.

Observation data (J2000 epoch)
- Constellation: Perseus
- Right ascension: 03^{h} 18^{m} 44.9^{s}
- Declination: 41° 28′ 04″
- Redshift: 0.016875
- Heliocentric radial velocity: 5059 km/s
- Distance: 220 Mly (67 Mpc)
- Group or cluster: Perseus Cluster
- Apparent magnitude (V): 15.4

Characteristics
- Type: cD, E+
- Size: ~85,300 ly (26.14 kpc) (estimated)
- Apparent size (V): 1.1 x 0.9

Other designations
- CGCG 540-92, MCG 7-7-55, PGC 12331, UGC 2657

NGC 1267 is an elliptical galaxy located about 220 million light-years away in the constellation Perseus. NGC 1267 was discovered by astronomer Heinrich d'Arrest on February 14, 1863. NGC 1267 is a member of the Perseus Cluster and is possibly interacting with the spiral galaxy NGC 1268.

== See also ==
- List of NGC objects (1001–2000)
- NGC 4567 and NGC 4568
- Eyes Galaxies
