= NGC 1275 =

Seyfert galaxy in the constellation Perseus

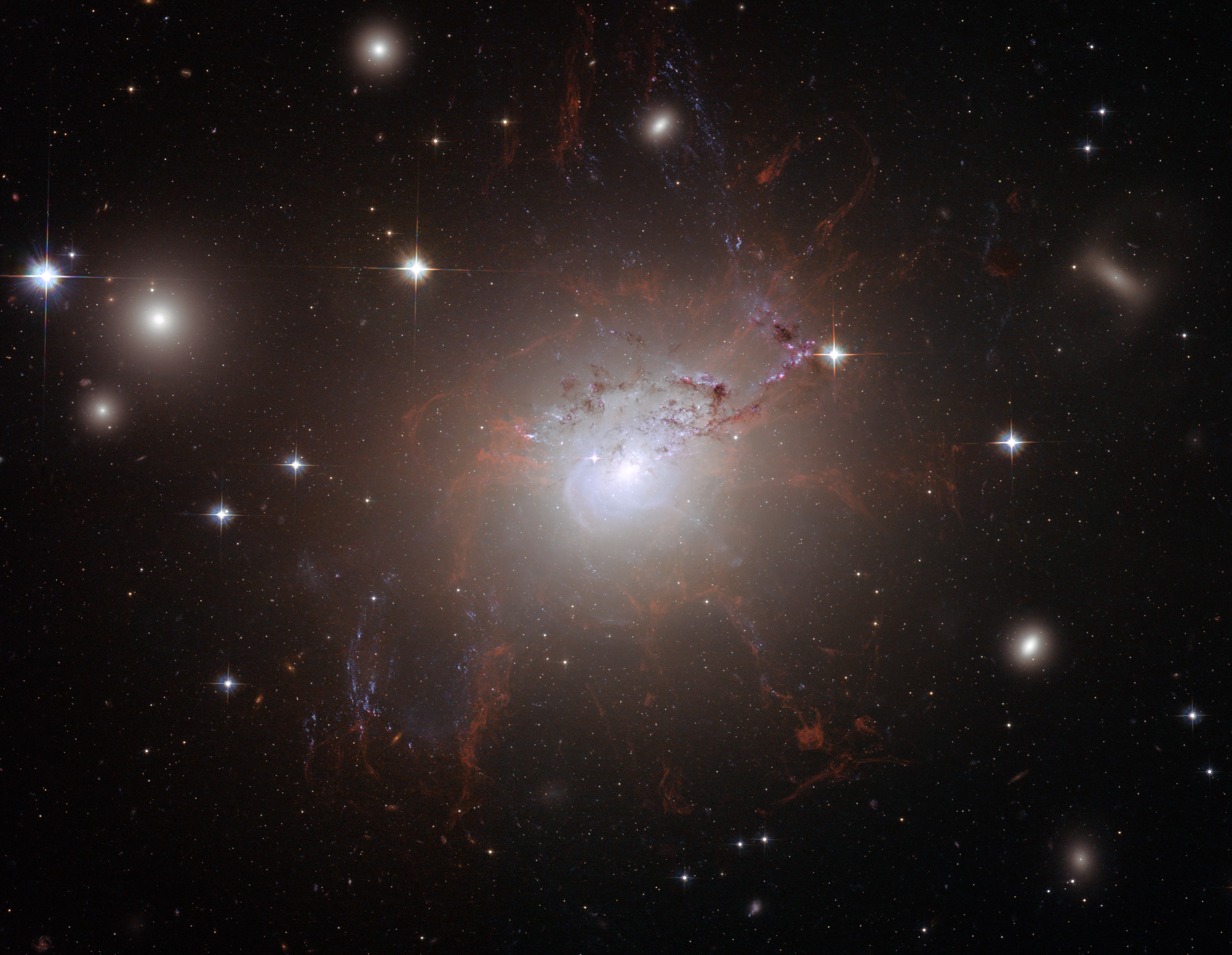
- NGC 1275 imaged by the Hubble Space Telescope

Observation data (J2000 epoch)
- Constellation: Perseus
- Right ascension: 03^{h} 19^{m} 48.1601^{s}
- Declination: +41° 30′ 42.103″
- Redshift: 0.017670±0.00003
- Heliocentric radial velocity: 5,264±11 km/s
- Distance: 225.19 ± 10.29 Mly (69.044 ± 3.154 Mpc)
- Group or cluster: Perseus Cluster
- Apparent magnitude (V): 12.6

Characteristics
- Type: cD;pec;NLRG
- Size: ~295,000 ly (90.45 kpc) (estimated)
- Apparent size (V): 2.2′ × 1.7′

Other designations
- Perseus A, QSO B0316+413, 3C 84, IRAS 03164+4119, UGC 2669, MCG +07-07-063, Mrk 1505, PGC 12429, CGCG 540-103, C 24

NGC 1275 (also known as Perseus A or 3C 84) is a type 1.5 Seyfert galaxy located around 225 million light-years away from Earth in the direction of the constellation of Perseus. NGC 1275 is a member of the large Perseus Cluster of galaxies. It was discovered by German-British astronomer William Herschel on 17 October 1786.

== Properties ==
NGC 1275 consists of two galaxies, the central type-cD galaxy of the Perseus Cluster, and a so-called high velocity system (HVS) which lies in front of it. The HVS is moving at 3000 km/s towards the dominant system, and is believed to be merging with the Perseus Cluster. The HVS is not affecting the cD galaxy yet, as it lies at least 200 thousand light years in front of it. However tidal interactions with the cluster are disrupting it and the ram pressure produced by its interaction with the intracluster medium of Perseus is stripping its gas as well as inducing fast formation of stars from its gas.

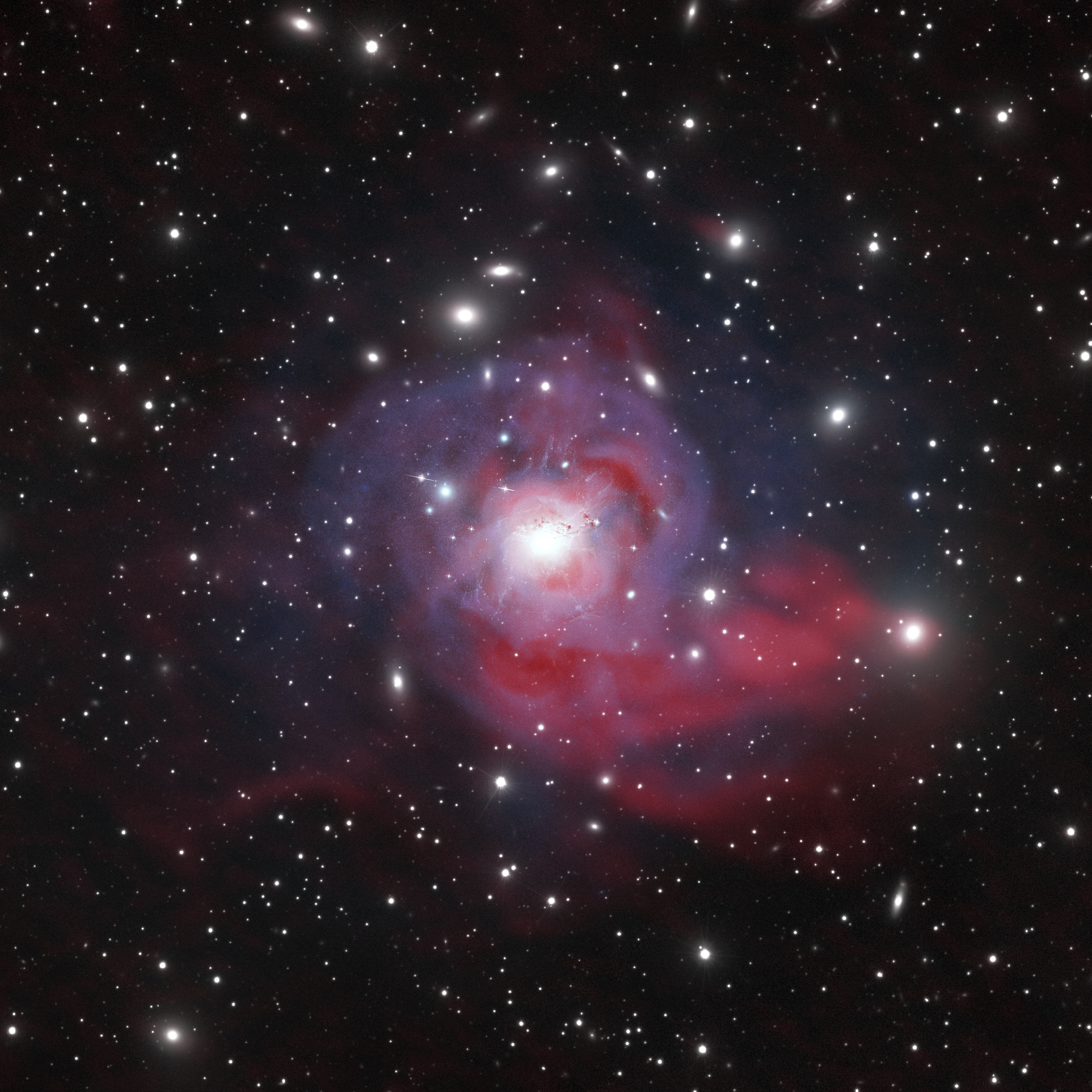
Wide multi-wavelength composite view of NGC 1275. An active supermassive black hole in the galaxy powers strong jets of particles into the Perseus Cluster, causing the gas present to reach 60 million degrees Celsius and emit X-ray light (in blue).

The central cluster galaxy contains a massive network of spectral line emitting filaments, which apparently are being dragged out by rising bubbles of relativistic plasma generated by the central active galactic nucleus. Long gaseous filaments made up of threads of gas stretch out beyond the galaxy, into the multimillion-degree, X-ray–emitting gas that fills the cluster. The amount of gas contained in a typical thread is approximately one million times the mass of the Sun. They are only 200 light-years wide, are often very straight, and extend for up to 20,000 light-years.

The existence of the filaments poses a problem. As they are much cooler than the surrounding intergalactic cloud, it is unclear how they have existed for such a long time, or why they have not warmed, dissipated or collapsed to form stars. One possibility is that weak magnetic fields (about one-ten-thousandth the strength of Earth's field) exert enough force on the ions within the threads to keep them together.

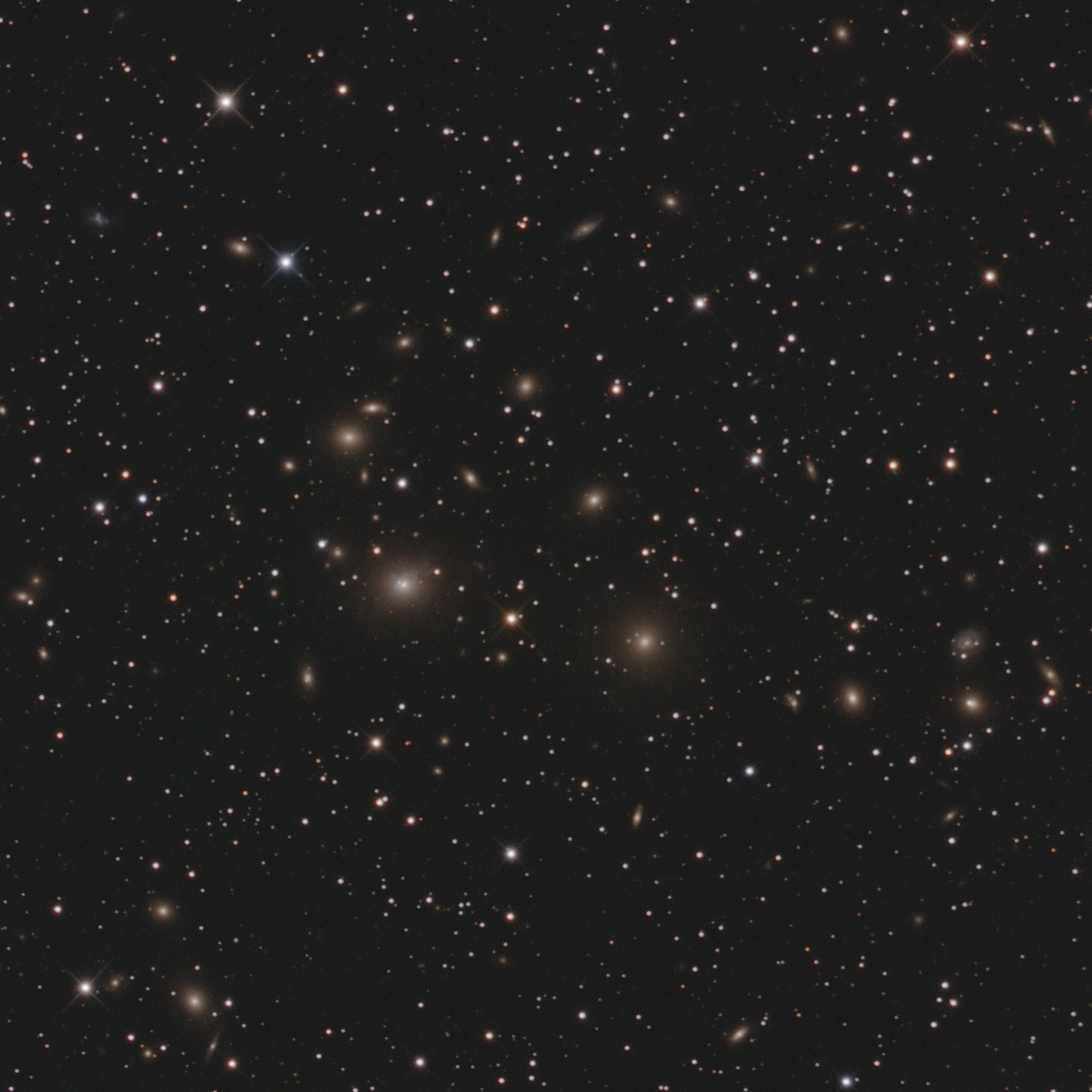
NGC 1275 (center left) is the brightest member of the Perseus Cluster.

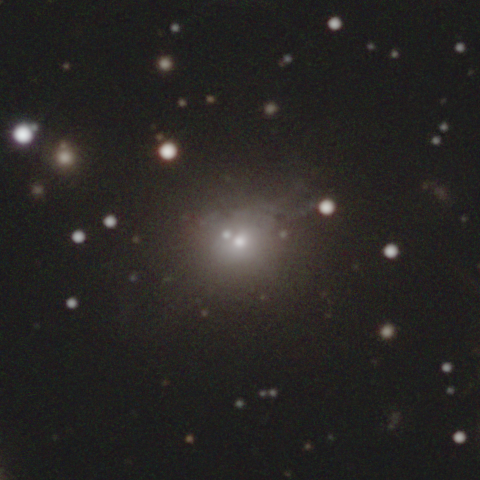
Large amateur telescopes can resolve hints of detail in the high-velocity system.

NGC 1275 contains 13 billion solar masses of molecular hydrogen that seems to be infalling from Perseus' intracluster medium in a cooling flow, both feeding its active nucleus and fueling significant amounts of star formation

The presence of an active nucleus demonstrates that a supermassive black hole is present in NGC 1275's center. The black hole is surrounded by a rotating disk of molecular gas. High-resolution observations of the rotation of this disk obtained using adaptive optics at the Gemini North telescope indicate a central mass of approximately 800 million solar masses, including both the mass of the black hole and of the inner core of the gas disk.

== Supernovae ==
Three supernovae have so far been observed in NGC 1275:

- SN 1968A (type unknown, mag. 15.5) was discovered by Miklós Lovas on 25 January 1968.
- SN 2005mz (Type Ia, mag. 18.2) was discovered by Jack Newton, Mike Peoples, and Tim Puckett on 31 December 2005.
- SN 2024xav (Type II-P, mag. 18.63) was discovered by GOTO on 2 October 2024.

== See also ==
- List of NGC objects (1001–2000)
