= Intracluster medium =

Superheated plasma that permeates a galaxy cluster

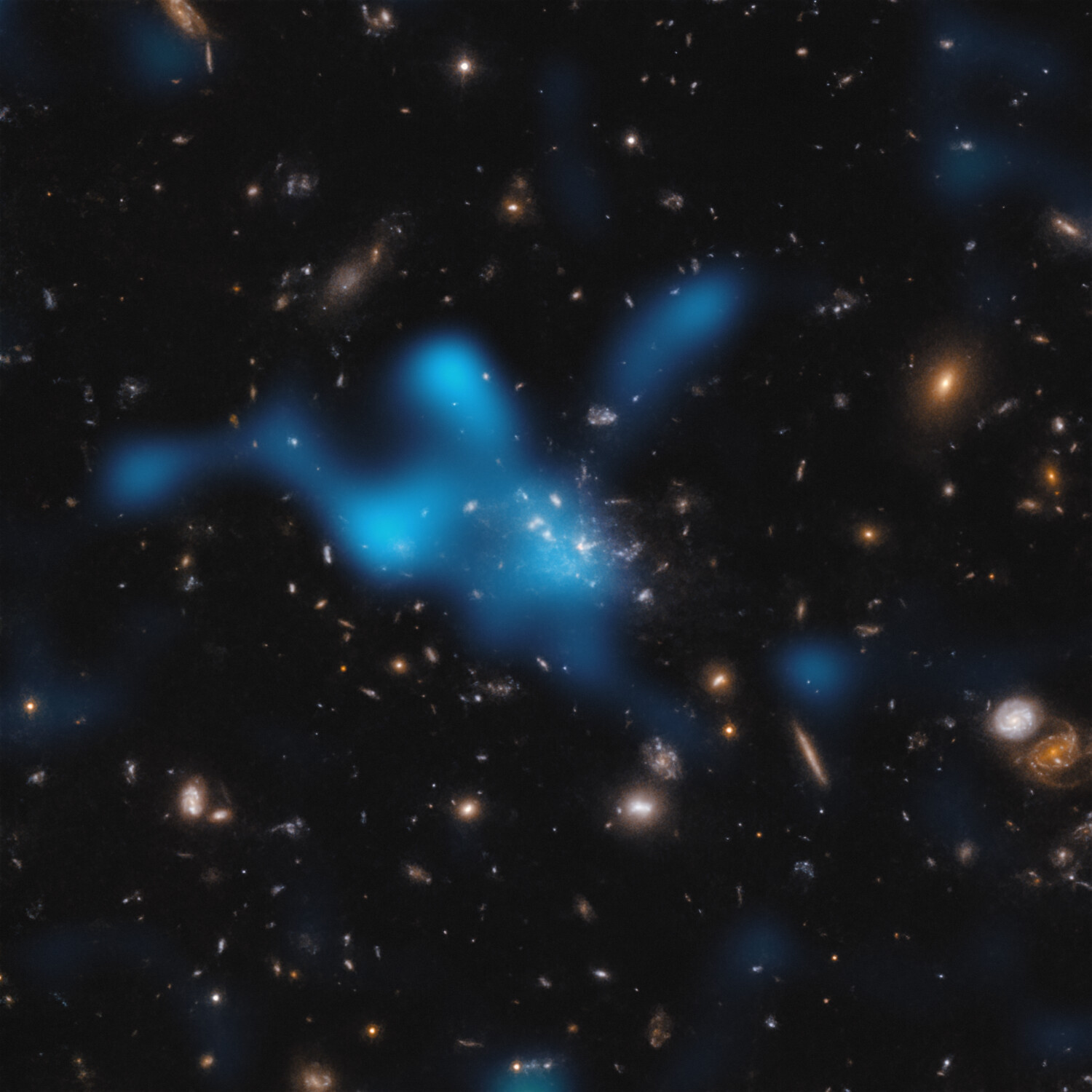
The overlaid blue cloud illustrates the intracluster medium around the Spiderweb Galaxy, as seen when the universe was 3 billion years old.

In astronomy, the intracluster medium (ICM) is the superheated plasma that permeates a galaxy cluster. The gas consists mainly of ionized hydrogen and helium and accounts for most of the baryonic material in galaxy clusters. The ICM is heated to temperatures on the order of 10 to 100 megakelvins, emitting strong X-ray radiation.

== Composition ==
The ICM is composed primarily of ordinary baryons, mainly ionized hydrogen and helium. This plasma is enriched with heavier elements, including iron. The average amount of heavier elements relative to hydrogen, known as the metallicity in astronomy, ranges from a third to a half of the value in the Sun. Studying the chemical composition of ICMs as a function of radius has shown that cores of the galaxy clusters are more metal-rich than at larger radii. In some clusters (e.g. the Centaurus Cluster) the metallicity of the gas can rise to above that of the Sun. Due to the gravitational field of a cluster, metal-enriched gas ejected from supernovae remains gravitationally bound to the cluster as part of the ICM. By looking at varying redshifts, which corresponds to looking at different epochs of the evolution of the Universe, the ICM can provide a historical record of element production in a galaxy.

Roughly 15% of a galaxy cluster's mass resides in the ICM. The stars and galaxies contribute only around 5% to the total mass. It is theorized that most of the mass in a galaxy cluster consists of dark matter and not baryonic matter. For the Virgo Cluster, the ICM contains roughly 3 × 10^{14} Solar masses (M_{☉}) while the total mass of the cluster is estimated to be 1.2 × 10^{15} M_{☉}.

Although the ICM on the whole contains the bulk of a cluster's baryons, it is not very dense, with typical values of 10^{−3} particles per cubic centimeter. The mean free path of the particles is roughly 10^{16} m, or about one light-year. The density of the ICM rises towards the center of the cluster with a relatively strong peak. In addition, the temperature of the ICM typically drops to 1/2 or 1/3 of the outer value in the central regions. Once the density of the plasma reaches a critical value, enough interactions between the ions ensures cooling via X-ray radiation.

== Observing the intracluster medium ==
As the ICM is at such high temperatures, it emits X-ray radiation, mainly by the bremsstrahlung process and X-ray emission lines from the heavy elements. These X-rays can be observed using an X-ray telescope and through analysis of this data, it is possible to determine the physical conditions, including the temperature, density, and metallicity of the plasma.

Measurements of the temperature and density profiles in galaxy clusters allow for a determination of the mass distribution profile of the ICM through hydrostatic equilibrium modeling. The mass distributions determined from these methods reveal masses that far exceed the luminous mass seen and are thus a strong indication of dark matter in galaxy clusters.

Inverse Compton scattering of low energy photons through interactions with the relativistic electrons in the ICM cause distortions in the spectrum of the cosmic microwave background radiation (CMB), known as the Sunyaev–Zel'dovich effect. These temperature distortions in the CMB can be used by telescopes such as the South Pole Telescope to detect dense clusters of galaxies at high redshifts.

In December 2022, the James Webb Space Telescope is reported to be studying the faint light emitted in the intracluster medium. A 2018 study found this to be an "accurate luminous tracer of dark matter".

Calculations from Chandra observations of electron density and temperature in clusters outside of thermal equilibrium were made in 2023, but they proved that higher precision and scale of X-ray instrumentation is necessary to resolve the true properties of clusters on a galactic scale.

Some clusters contain radio halos in their centers, which emit faint but detectable radio radiation. Observations of these halos in conjunction with Faraday rotation measures (RM) of radio galaxies in or behind clusters have been used to study the large-scale cluster magnetic field.

== Cooling flows ==
Plasma in regions of the cluster, with a cooling time shorter than the age of the system, should be cooling due to strong X-ray radiation where emission is proportional to the density squared. Since the density of the ICM is highest towards the center of the cluster, the radiative cooling time drops a significant amount. The central cooled gas can no longer support the weight of the external hot gas and the pressure gradient drives a cooling flow where the hot gas from the external regions flows slowly towards the center of the cluster. This inflow would result in regions of cold gas and thus regions of new star formation. Recently however, with the launch of new X-ray telescopes such as the Chandra X-ray Observatory, images of galaxy clusters with better spatial resolution have been taken. These new images do not indicate signs of new star formation on the order of what was historically predicted, motivating research into the mechanisms that would prevent the central ICM from cooling.

A simulation by Eric Rohr et al. of 352 galaxy clusters in the TNG-Cluster software in 2024 found that clusters with lower masses and higher redshifts are more susceptible to cooling. This simulation also showed that the progenitors of galaxy clusters tended to have a lower temperature and higher ratios of both cool ICM mass to total ICM mass and to total cluster galactic halo mass. Rohr speculates that supermassive black holes within galaxy clusters are the most important contributor to the overall cool ICM mass in a cluster by the effects of their combined kinetic energy on star formation.

== Heating ==
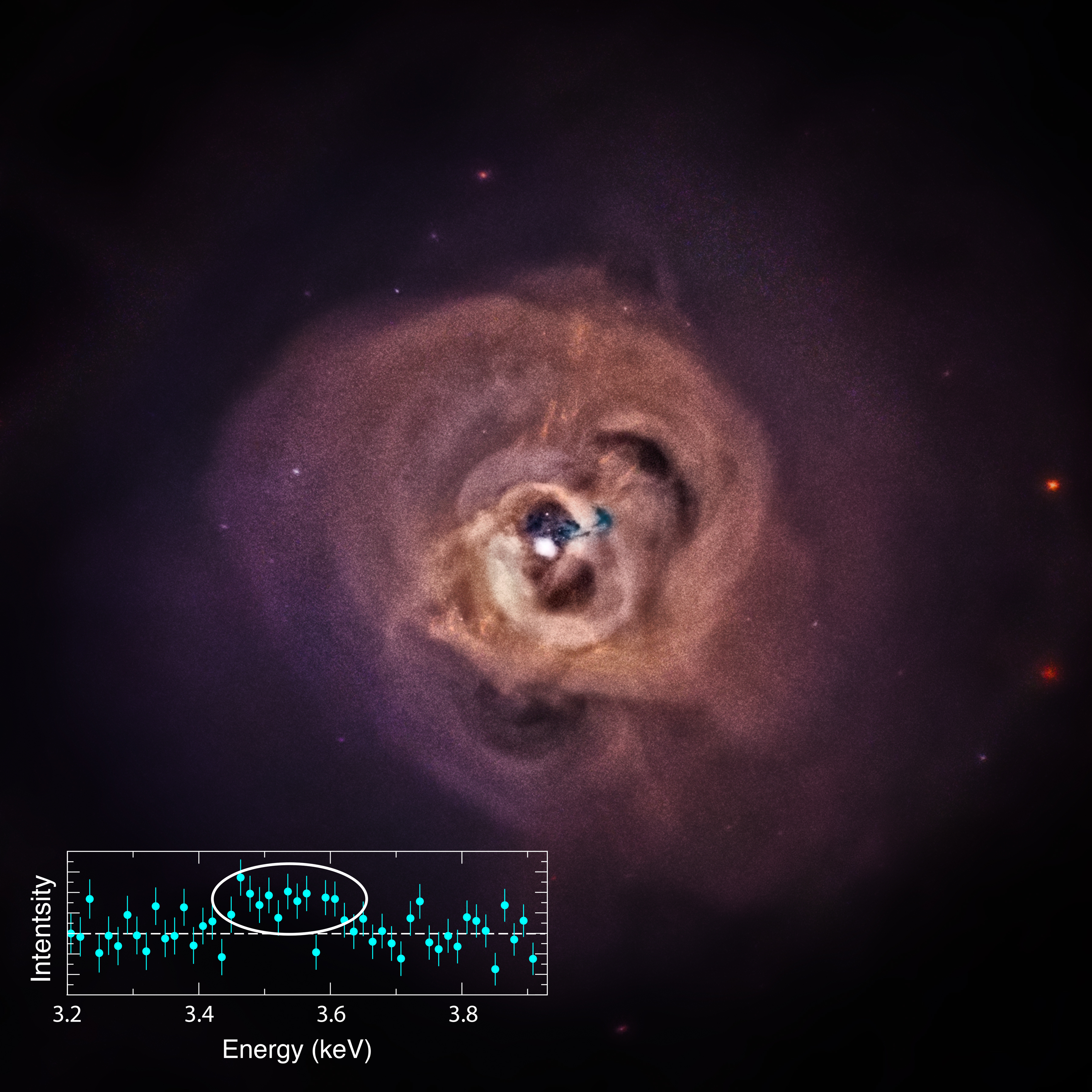
Chandra image of the Perseus Cluster's radio lobes. These relativistic jets of plasma emit radio waves, are X-ray "cold", and appear as dark patches in stark contrast to the rest of the ICM.

There are two popular explanations of the mechanisms that prevent the central ICM from cooling: feedback from active galactic nuclei through injection of relativistic jets of plasma and sloshing of the ICM plasma during mergers with subclusters. The relativistic jets of material from active galactic nuclei can be seen in images taken by telescopes with high angular resolution such as the Chandra X-ray Observatory.

== Magnetic Field ==
Faraday rotation measures (RM) of galaxies in clusters usually show magnetic fields with strengths of a few micro Gauss (μG), but regions with fields of ~10 μG have been observed. These fields vary widely throughout the ICM on scales of 100 parsec to 10 kiloparsec. By studying RMs at many radii from the cluster center, the magnetic field power spectrum can be modeled as a function of distance from the cluster center and gas density. A power law with slope close to the Kolmogorov index can be used to model some clusters, but clusters with shallower slopes have also been observed.

== See also ==
- Interstellar medium
- Intergalactic medium
