= NGC 1277 =

Galaxy in the constellation Perseus

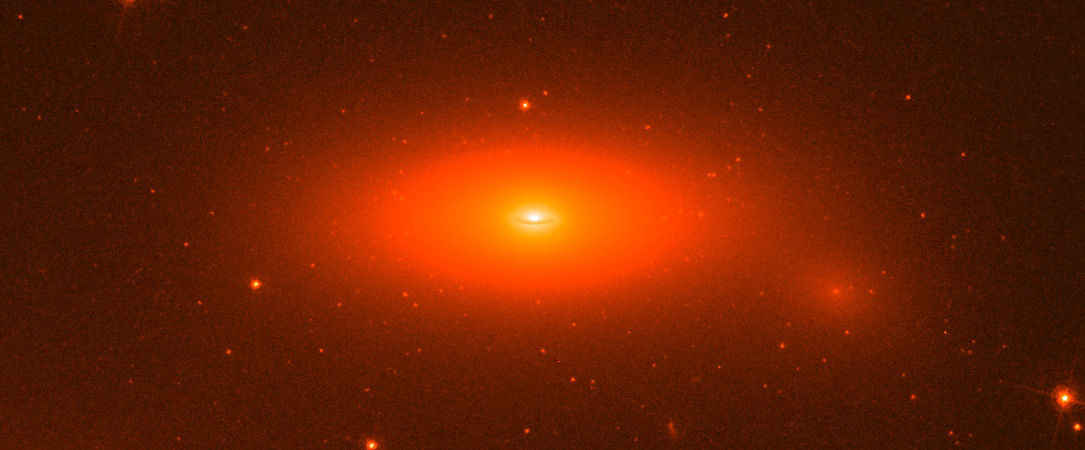
- NGC 1277 as seen by the HST

Observation data (J2000 epoch)
- Constellation: Perseus
- Right ascension: 03^{h} 19^{m} 51.5^{s}
- Declination: 41° 34′ 25″
- Redshift: 0.016898
- Heliocentric radial velocity: 5066 km/s
- Galactocentric velocity: 5168 km/s
- Distance: 73 Mpc (240 Mly)
- Group or cluster: Perseus Cluster
- Apparent magnitude (V): 14.66

Characteristics
- Type: S0^+, pec
- Size: ~52,700 ly (16.16 kpc) (estimated)
- Apparent size (V): 1.0 x 0.4

Other designations
- PGC 12434, LGG 088

NGC 1277 is a lenticular galaxy in the constellation of Perseus. It is a member of the Perseus Cluster of galaxies and is located approximately 73 Mpc (megaparsecs) or 240 million light-years from the Milky Way. It has an apparent magnitude of about 14.7. It was discovered on December 4, 1875, by Lawrence Parsons, 4th Earl of Rosse.

NGC 1277 has been called a "relic of the early universe" due to its stars being formed during a 100 million year interval about 12 billion years ago. Stars were formed at a rate of 1000 times that of the Milky Way galaxy's formation rate in a short burst of time. After this process of stellar formation ran its course, NGC 1277 was left populated with metal-rich stars that are about 7 billion years older than the Sun. NGC 1277 was the first galaxy confirmed as a relic galaxy — a nearby, passively evolved counterpart of the compact "red nugget" galaxies observed at redshift z ≈ 2 — and has since served as the archetype of this class. Observations with Hubble Space Telescope indicate that NGC 1277 lacks metal-poor globular clusters, suggesting that it has accreted little mass over its lifetime and supporting the relic galaxy hypothesis.

== Dark matter ==
NGC 1277 has a very unusual rotation curve that suggests that it contains very little dark matter.

== Supermassive black hole ==
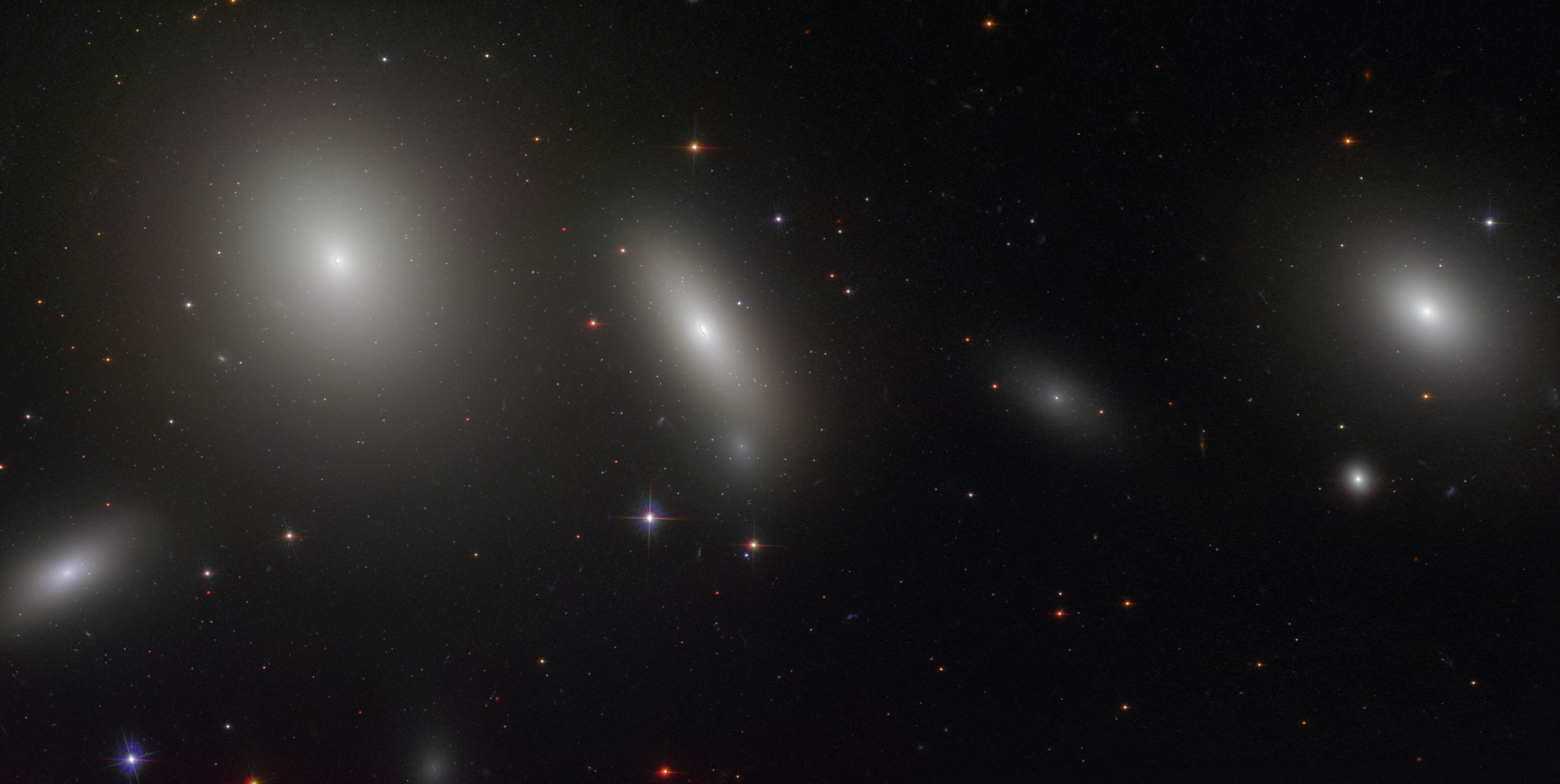
Hubble Space Telescope image of the galactic group in the Perseus Cluster that NGC 1277 is a member of. It is the bright galaxy just to the left of the center of the image.

Initial observations made using the Hobby–Eberly Telescope at Texas's McDonald Observatory suggested the presence of a black hole with a mass of about 1.7×10^{10} M_{☉} (17 billion solar masses), equivalent to 14% of the total stellar mass of the galaxy, due to the motions of the stars near the center of the galaxy. This resulted in the initial claim that the black hole in NGC 1277 is one of the largest known in relation to the mass of its host galaxy.

A follow-up study, based on the same data and published the following year, reached a very different conclusion. The black hole that was initially suggested at 1.7×10^{10} M_{☉} was not as massive as once thought. The black hole was estimated to be between 2 and 5 billion solar masses. This is less than a third of the previously estimated mass, a significant decrease. Models with no black hole at all were also found to provide reasonably good fits to the data, including the central region.

Subsequent investigations employed adaptive optics to acquire a better estimate of the mass of the black hole. One group made observations using the Gemini Near Infrared Integral Field Spectrometer to better determine the mass of the black hole at the center of NGC 1277. The group used similar models to that of van den Bosch, but with higher spatial resolution. After using stellar dynamics and luminosity models to estimate the mass of the black hole, they came to a mass of 4.9×10^{9} M_{☉}, similar to the estimate from the follow-up study done by Emsellem, which estimated a mass between 2–5 billion solar masses. In a competing analysis, another group made observations using the larger Keck Telescope with superior spatial resolution, and calculated that a black hole with mass 1.2×10^{9} M_{☉} fits best. Subsequent independent dynamical models, including Jeans models by Krajnović et al. (2018) and models incorporating dark matter, have supported the higher value of ≈5×10^{9} M_{☉}, which still places NGC 1277 well above standard black hole–galaxy scaling relations.

== See also ==
- List of galaxies
- List of nearest galaxies
- List of spiral galaxies
