= Perseus Cluster =

Galaxy cluster in the constellation Perseus

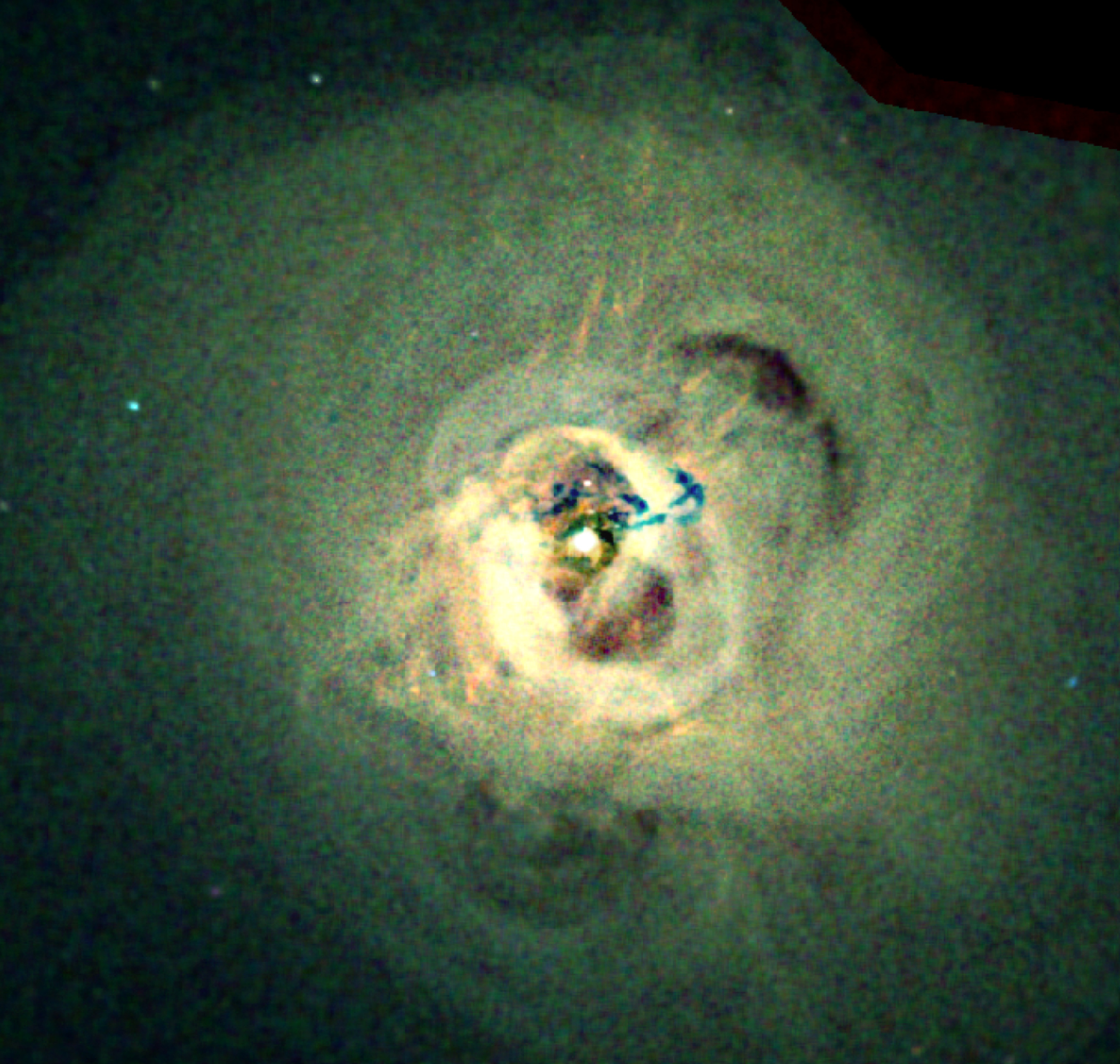
- Chandra X-ray Observatory observations of the central regions of the Perseus galaxy cluster. Image is 284 arcsec across. RA 03^{h} 19^{m} 47.60^{s} Dec +41° 30' 37.00" in Perseus. Observation dates: 13 pointings between August 8, 2002 and October 20, 2004. Color code: Energy (Red 0.3–1.2 keV, Green 1.2-2 keV, Blue 2–7 keV). Instrument: ACIS.

Observation data (Epoch J2000)
- Constellation: Perseus
- Right ascension: 03h^{h} 18^{m}
- Declination: +41° 30′
- Brightest member: NGC 1275
- Number of galaxies: >1000
- Parent structure: Perseus-Pisces Supercluster
- Richness class: 2
- Bautz–Morgan classification: II-III
- Redshift: 0.01790 (5 366 km/s)
- Distance: 73.6 Mpc (240.05 Mly) h^{−1}_{0.705}
- X-ray flux: 9.1×10^{−11} erg s^{−1} cm^{−2} (2–10 keV)

Other designations
- Abell 426, NGC 1275 Cluster, LGG 88

The Perseus Cluster (also known as Abell 426) is a cluster of galaxies in the constellation Perseus. It has a recession speed of 5,366 km/s and a diameter of 863′. It is one of the most massive objects in the known universe, containing thousands of galaxies immersed in a vast cloud of multimillion-degree gas.

== X-radiation from the cluster ==
The Perseus galaxy cluster is the brightest cluster in the sky when observed in the X-ray band.

The cluster contains the radio source 3C 84 that is currently blowing bubbles of relativistic plasma into the core of the cluster. These are seen as holes in an X-ray image of the cluster, as they push away the X-ray emitting gas. They are known as radio bubbles, because they appear as emitters of radio waves due to the relativistic particles in the bubble. The galaxy NGC 1275 is located at the centre of the cluster, where the X-ray emission is brightest.

The first detection of X-ray emission from the Perseus Cluster (astronomical designation Per XR-1) occurred during an Aerobee rocket flight on March 1, 1970. The X-ray source may be associated with NGC 1275 (Per A, 3C 84), and was reported in 1971. If the source is NGC 1275, then L_{x} is about 4 × 10^{45} ergs/s. More detailed observations from Uhuru confirmed the earlier detection and its source within the Perseus cluster.

=== Perseus galaxy cluster's Cosmic music note ===
In 2003, a team of astronomers led by Andrew Fabian at Cambridge University discovered one of the deepest notes ever detected, after 53 hours of Chandra observations. No human will actually hear the note, because its time period between oscillations is 9.6 million years, which is 57 octaves below the keys in the middle of a piano. The sound waves appear to be generated by the inflation of bubbles of relativistic plasma by the central active galactic nucleus in NGC 1275. The bubbles are visible as ripples in the X-ray band since the X-ray brightness of the intracluster medium that fills the cluster is strongly dependent on the density of the plasma. In May 2022, NASA reported the sonification (converting astronomical data associated with pressure waves into sound) of the black hole at the center of the Perseus galaxy cluster.

A similar case also happens in the nearby Virgo Cluster, generated by an even larger supermassive black hole in the galaxy Messier 87, also detected by Chandra. Like the former, no human will hear the note. The tone is variable, and even lower than those generated by NGC 1275, from 56 octaves below middle C on minor eruptions, to as low as 59 octaves below middle C on major eruptions.

== Image gallery ==
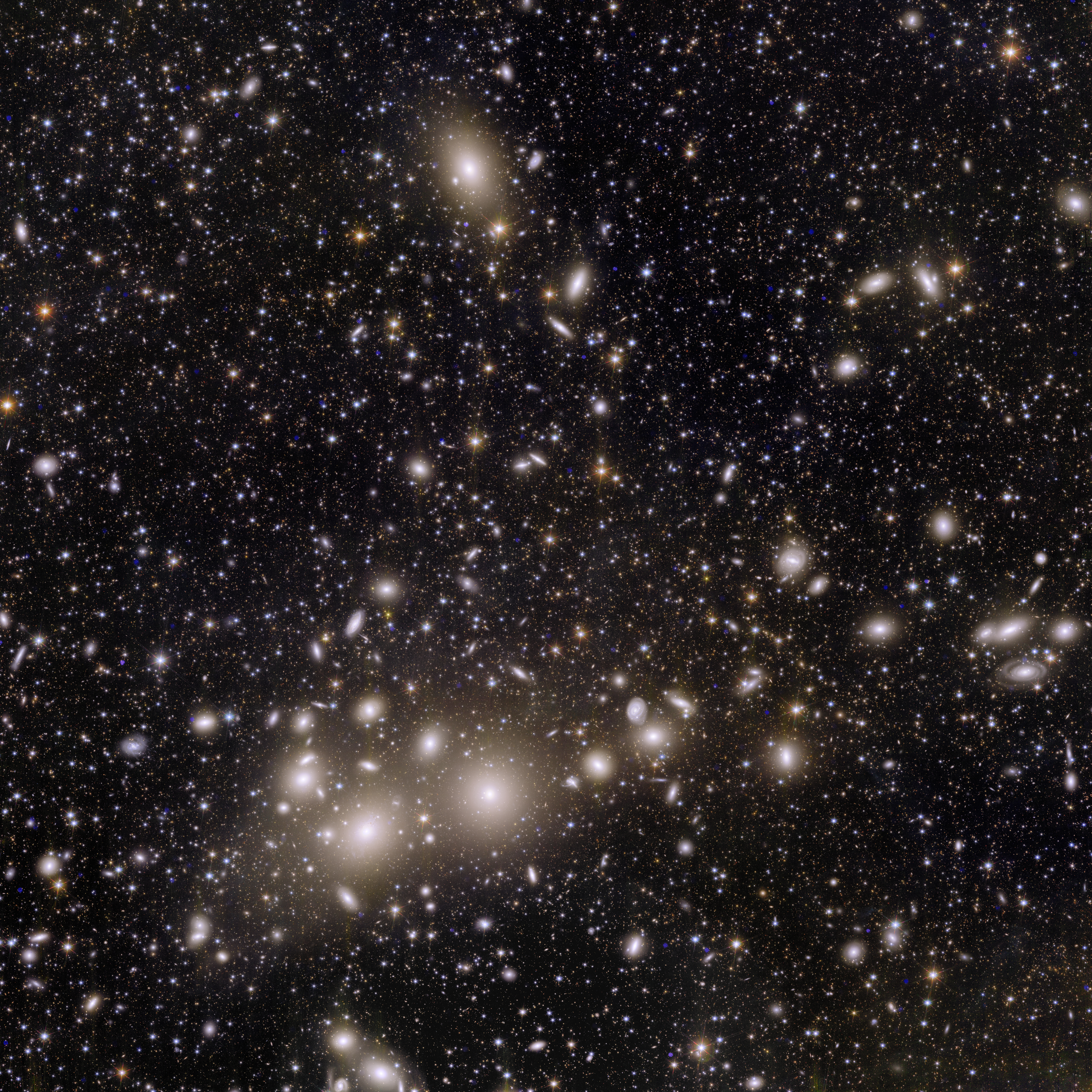
Euclid space telescope view of the Perseus Cluster. The image shows 1000 galaxies belonging to the cluster, and more than 100000 additional galaxies further away in the background

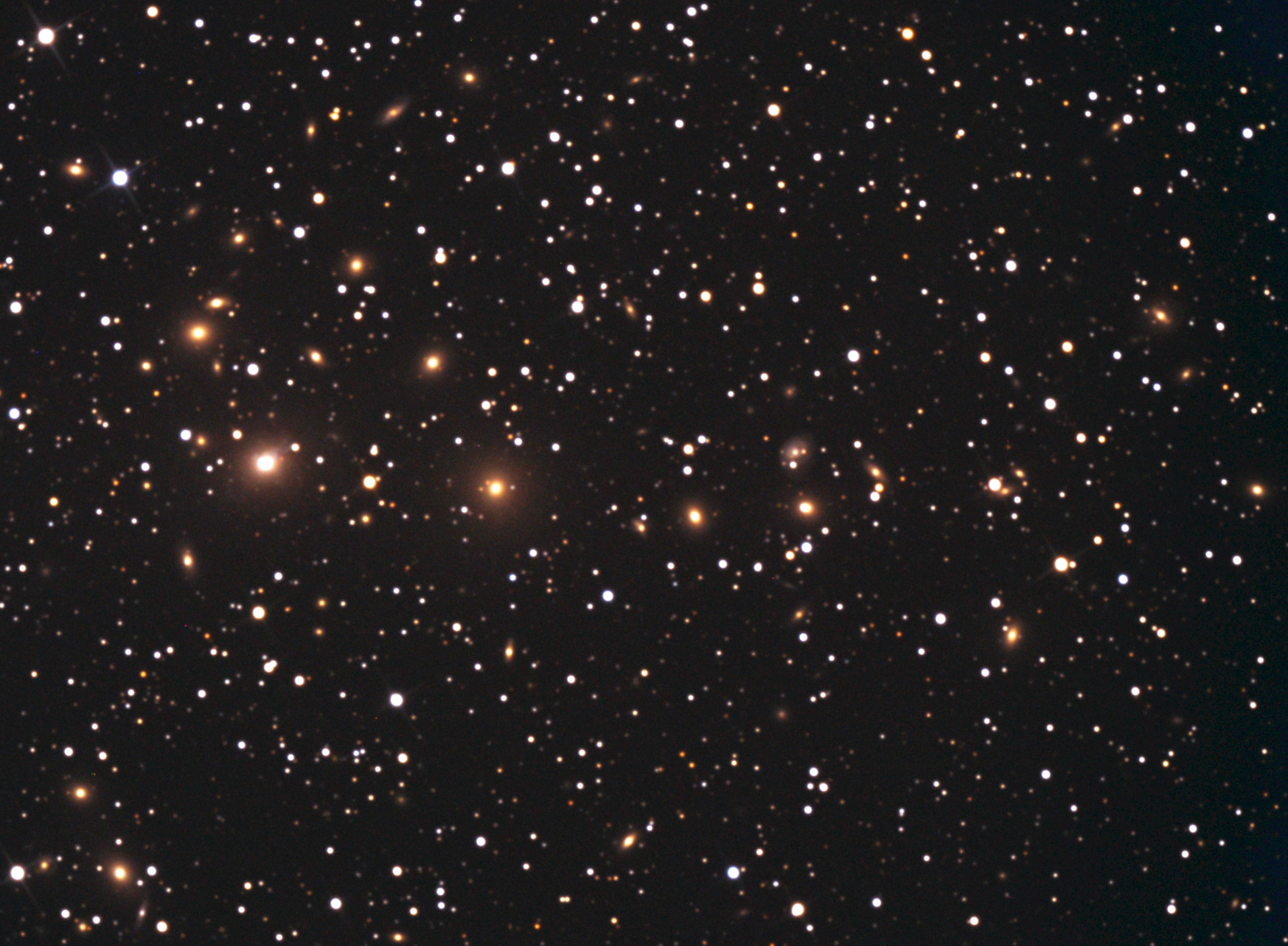
Perseus Cluster photographed with amateur equipment

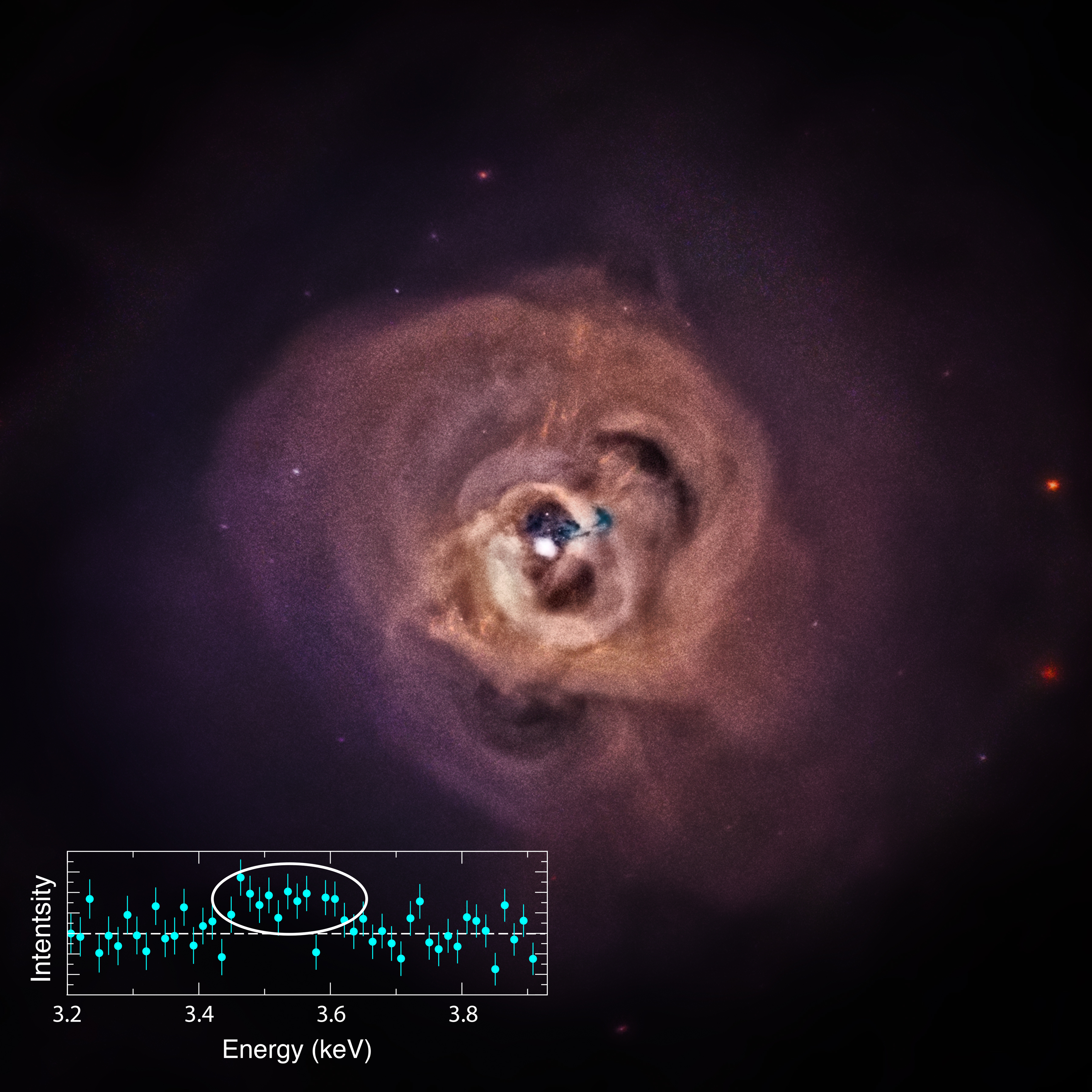
Perseus Cluster (Chandra X-ray).

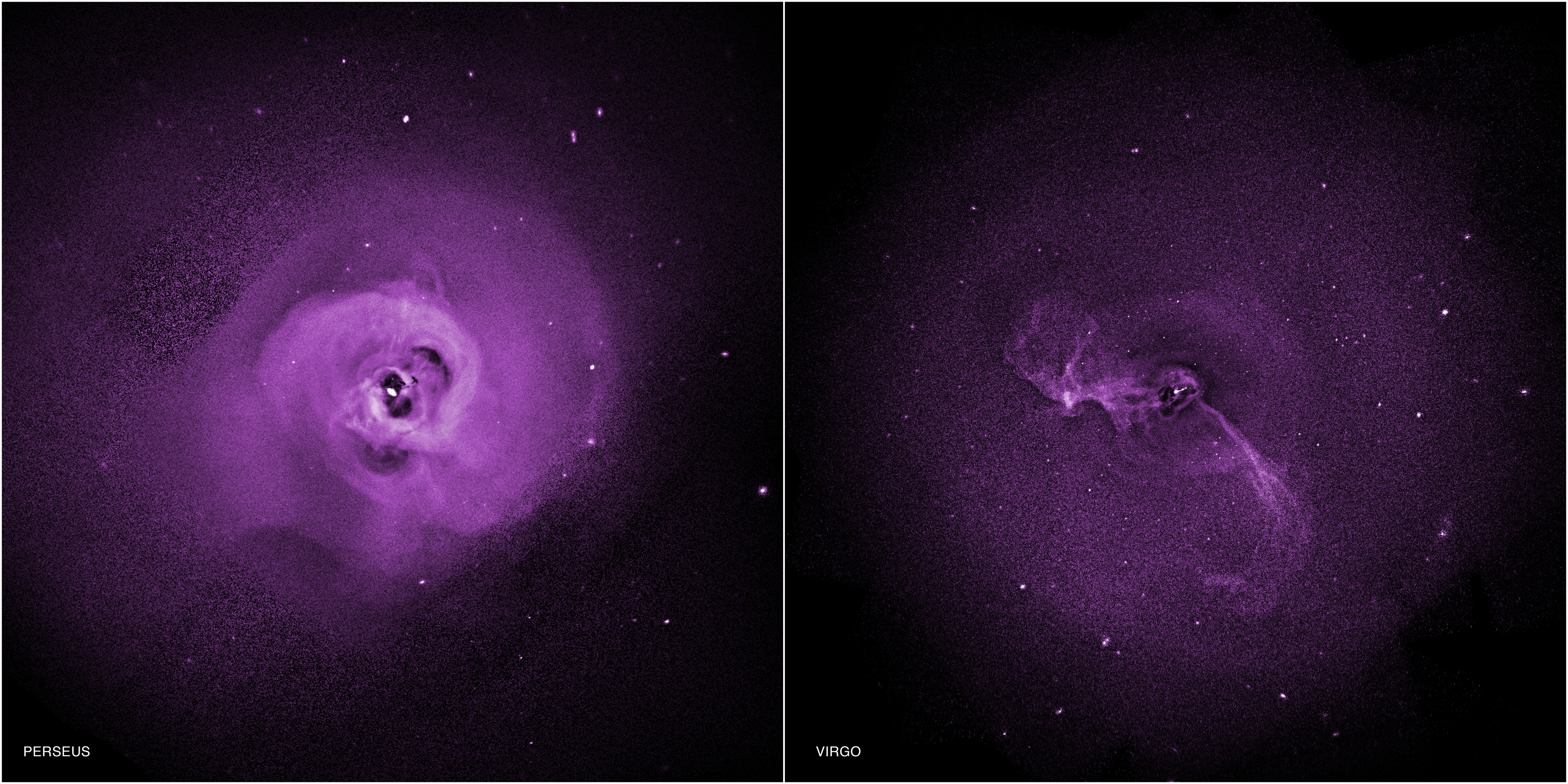
Turbulence may prevent galaxy clusters from cooling (Chandra X-ray).

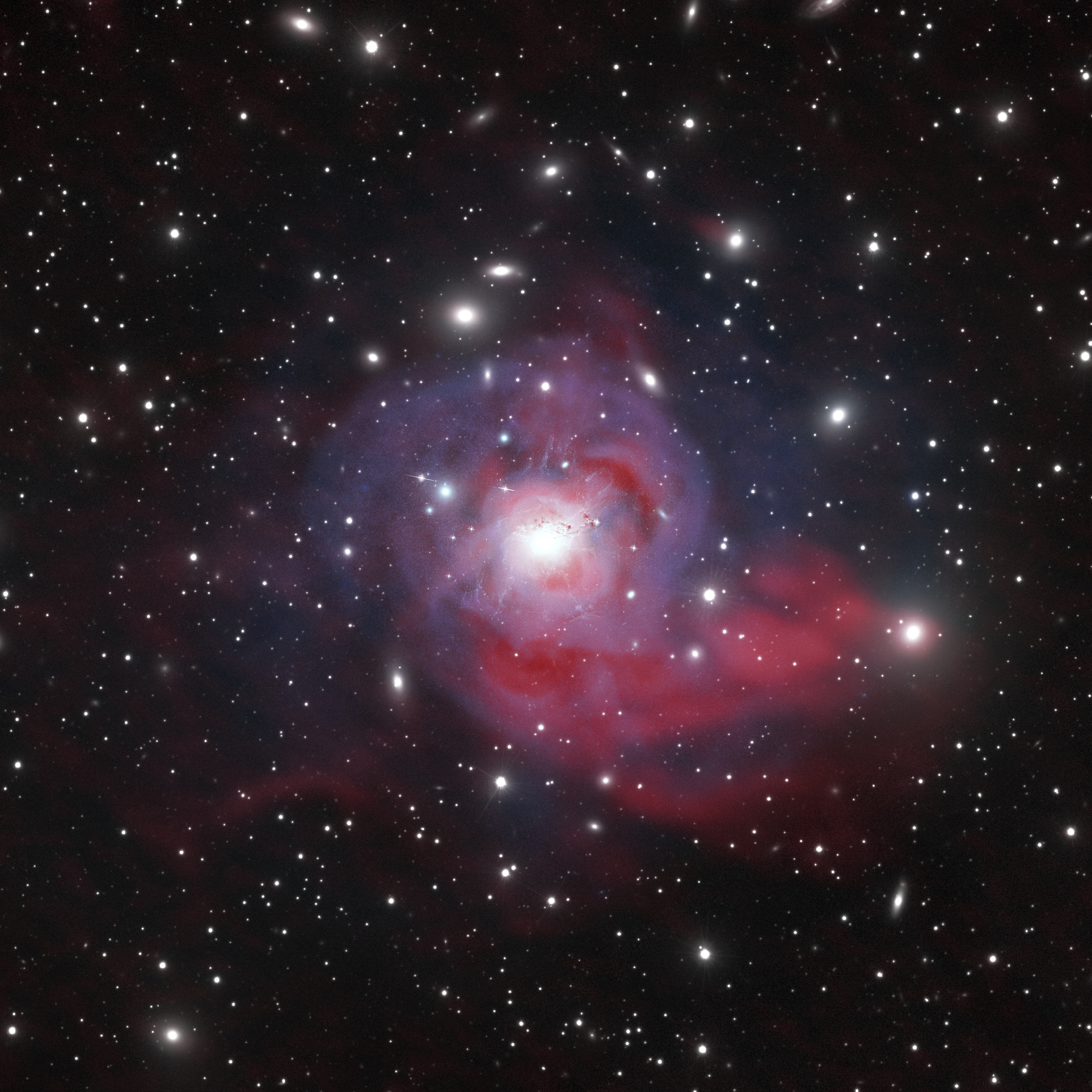
Composite view of NGC 1275 and the center of the Perseus Cluster (VLA-Radio, Chandra-X-ray, Hubble-Visible, SDSS-Infrared)

== See also ==
- Abell catalogue – Astronomical catalogue of galaxy clusters
- Galaxy groups and clusters – Largest known gravitationally bound object in universe; aggregation of galaxies
- Intracluster medium – Superheated plasma that permeates a galaxy cluster
- List of Abell clusters
