= Whole Earth Blazar Telescope =

International Consortium of Astronomers

The Whole Earth Blazar Telescope (WEBT) is an international consortium of astronomers created in 1997, with the aim to study a particular category of Active Galactic Nuclei (AGN) called blazars, which are characterized by strong and fast brightness variability, on time scales down to hours or less.

This collaboration involves many telescopes observing at optical, near-infrared, and radio (millimetric and centimetric) wavelengths. Thanks to their different geographic location all around the world, the emission variations of the pointed source can be monitored 24 hours a day, with the observing task moving from east to west as the Earth rotates.

WEBT observations are often carried out in conjunction with observations at higher frequencies, from ultraviolet to gamma rays, performed by both space and ground-based telescopes. In this way, information on blazar emission over almost the whole electromagnetic spectrum can be obtained.

The multi-wavelength studies performed by the WEBT have the purpose of understanding the physical mechanisms that rule the variable emission of these celestial objects. This emission mainly comes from a plasma jet pointing closely to the line of sight, and originating from a supermassive black hole located in the core of the host galaxy.

== Foundation ==
The WEBT was founded in autumn 1997 by John Mattox, from the Institute of Astrophysical Research at the Boston University, as a collaboration among optical observers.

Three years after, in 2000, the leadership was committed to Massimo Villata, from the Observatory of Turin. A constitution was issued, defining purposes and management of the organization. Soon after, also radio and near-infrared observers joined the consortium.

== Observing campaigns ==
Until February 2009, the WEBT has organised 24 observing campaigns, with the participation of more than one hundred telescopes. Each campaign is devoted to a specific source, and is led by a Campaign Manager appointed by the President. The Campaign Manager is responsible for the observing strategy, data collection, analysis and interpretation, and finally takes care of the publication of the results.

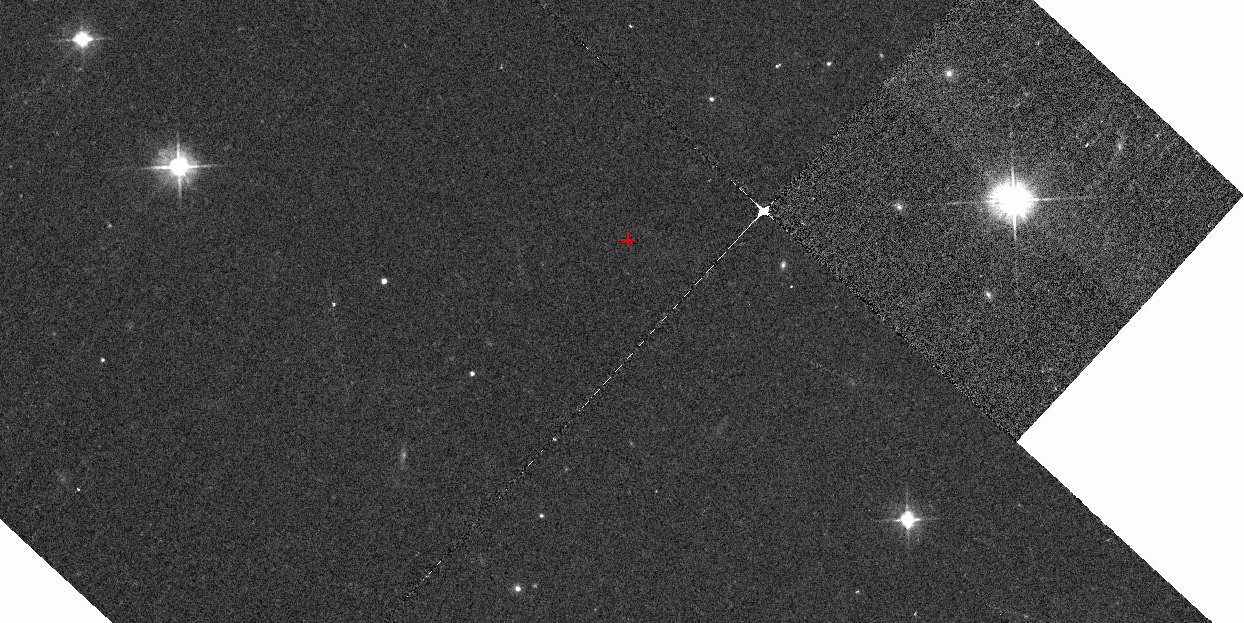
Blazar 3C 66A (on the far right) as seen by HST. Even with the WFPC2 this object appears star-like.

This is the list of the blazars that have been targets of WEBT campaigns:

- AO 0235+16
- Markarian 421
- S5 0716+71
- BL Lacertae
- Markarian 501
- 3C 66A
- OJ 287
- 3C 454.3
- 3C 279

== Papers ==
After eighteen years of operations, more than 160 scientific publications have been released.

== The GASP ==
On September 4, 2007, the WEBT started a new project: the GLAST-AGILE Support Program (GASP). Its aim is to provide observing support at longer wavelengths to the observations by the gamma-ray satellites GLAST (Gamma-ray Large Area Space Telescope, later renamed Fermi Gamma-ray Space Telescope in honor of the famous Italian physicist Enrico Fermi), and AGILE (Astro-rivelatore Gamma a Immagini LEggero). The GASP strategy is a long-term monitoring of selected targets, with periodic data gathering and analysis.

The list of the GASP monitored blazars includes 28 bright objects: 3C 66A, AO 0235+16, PKS 0420−01, PKS 0528+134, S5 0716+71, PKS 0735+17, OJ 248, OJ 49, 4C 71.07, OJ 287, S4 0954+65, Markarian 421, 4C 29.45, ON 231, 3C 273, 3C 279, PKS 1510−08, DA 406, 4C 38.41, 3C 345, Markarian 501, 4C 51.37, 3C 371, PKS 2155−304, BL Lacertae, CTA 102, 3C 454.3 and 1ES 2344+514.
