= 1ES 0414+009 =

BL Lacertae object in the constellation of Taurus

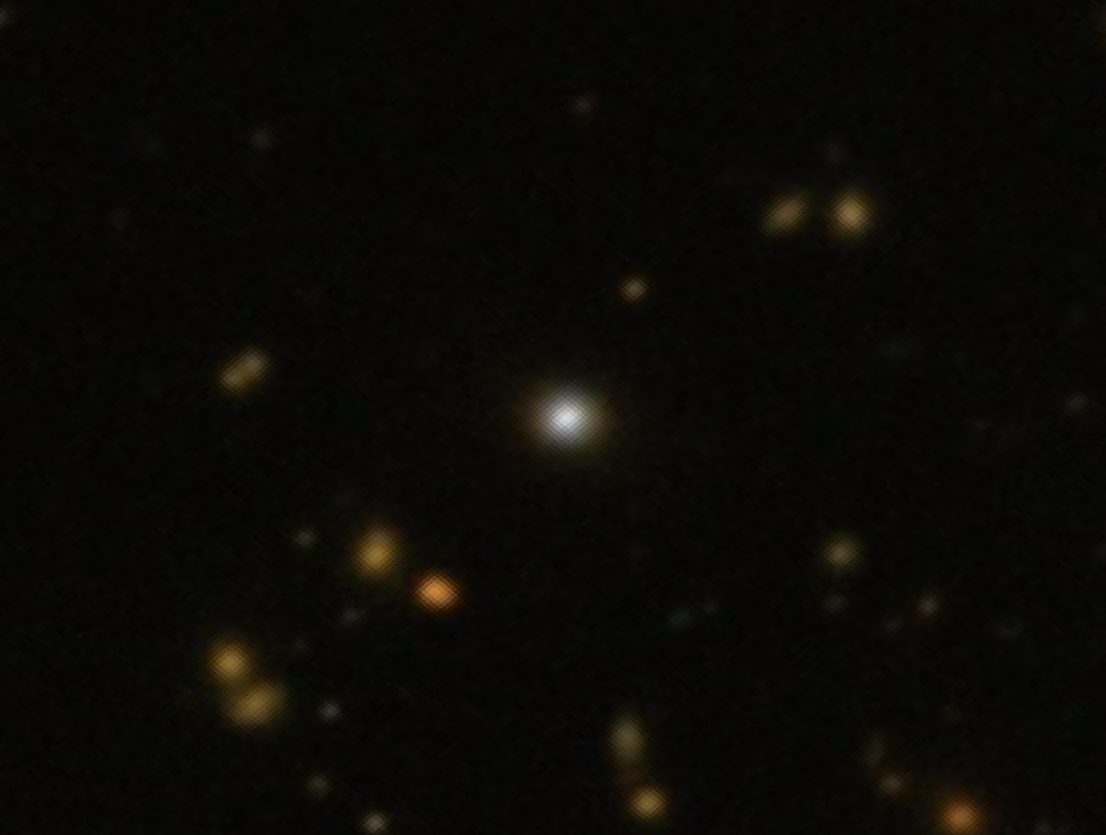
- The BL Lacertae object 1ES 0414+009.

Observation data (J2000.0 epoch)
- Constellation: Taurus
- Right ascension: 04^{h} 16^{m} 52.49^{s}
- Declination: +01° 05′ 23.89″
- Redshift: 0.287000
- Heliocentric radial velocity: 86,040 km/s
- Distance: 3.400 Gly
- Apparent magnitude (V): 16.38
- Apparent magnitude (B): 16.86

Characteristics
- Type: BLLAC

Other designations
- 2MASS J04165249+0105239, 1AXG J041652+0105, 2E 0414+0057, RBS 0530, RX J0416.8+0105, UVQS J041652.49+010523.9, PMN J0416+0105, NVSS J041652+010526

1ES 0414+009 known as H 0414+009, is a BL Lacertae object with an active galactic nucleus located in the constellation of Taurus. The redshift of the object is (z) 0.287 and it was first discovered by M.P. Ulmer and other astronomers who described its radio spectrum as mainly flat with its optical spectrum categorized as featureless.

== Description ==
1ES 0414+009 is located in the center of a moderately rich galaxy cluster. The host galaxy is a giant luminous elliptical galaxy of either a cD or BCG type. The total host magnitude of the galaxy is estimated as between 17.45 and 17.80 and its luminosity profile is best fitted with an elliptical model with a total estimated radius of 29 kiloparsecs. The central supermassive black hole mass of the galaxy is 2 × 10^{9} M_{☉}.

Very high energy gamma ray (VHE) emission was detected from the galaxy in 2009. The average flux is estimated to be above the energy units of 1 GeV, reaching 0.67 ± 0.21 × 10^{−9} photons cm^{−2} s^{−1} with a measured hard spectrum index of 1.78 ± 0.23. This places it under the classification of high frequency-peaked BL Lac objects or a blazar.

The radio structure of the galaxy is compact. When observed, it is found to contain a radio core that is unresolved, with a flux density of 75 ± 2 Jy and a radio tail that is extending outwards from it by 40 arcseconds. There is also an extended radio jet towards the east-northeast from the core region with traces of weak radio emission in the southeast direction. This heavily suggests the jet has a bend angle to the south upon reaching 10 parsecs from the core. Further imaging has found there are inner jet components present with their position angle varying from 56° to 90°, while the outer jet components are between 88° and 124°.
