= NGC 2484 =

Galaxy in the constellation Lynx

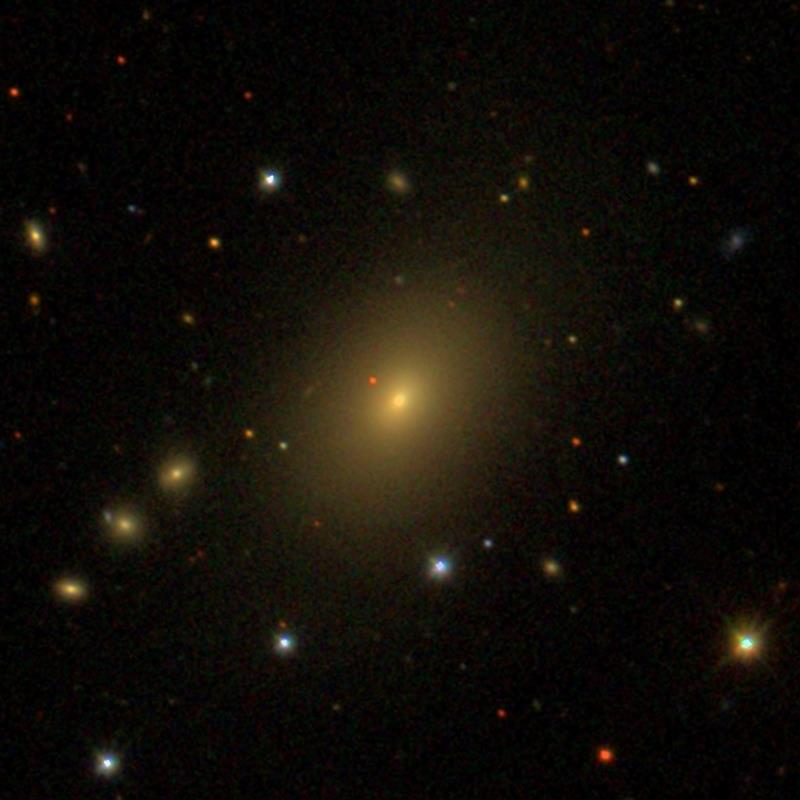
- NGC 2484 captured by Sloan Digital Sky Survey

Observation data (J2000 epoch)
- Constellation: Lynx
- Right ascension: 07^{h} 58^{m} 28.1081^{s}
- Declination: +37° 47′ 11.808″
- Redshift: 0.040825
- Heliocentric radial velocity: 12,339 km/s
- Distance: 588.1 ± 41.2 Mly (180.31 ± 12.62 Mpc)
- Apparent magnitude (V): 14.9

Characteristics
- Type: S0
- Size: ~283,000 ly (86.8 kpc) (estimated)
- Notable features: Radio galaxy

Other designations
- PGC 22350, UGC 4125, 2MASX J07582810+3747121, MCG+06-18-004, 7C 075509.69+375523.00, NVSS J075828+374713, 4C +37.21, 3C 189, NSA 015647, IRCF J075828.1+374711, CALIFA 3011, B2 0755+37, LEDA 22350

NGC 2484 is a large lenticular galaxy located in the constellation Lynx. It is situated about 590 million light-years away from the Milky Way, which given by its apparent dimensions, means NGC 2484 is around 283,000 light-years across. It is classified a Fanaroff and Riley radio galaxy.

== Observation history ==
NGC 2484 was discovered on 21 January in 1885, by French astronomer Edouard Stephan, who first described the object as "very faint, very small round with a bright middle and mottled, but not resolved."

== Characteristics ==
NGC 2484 has an active galactic nucleus. It also hosts a radio source in its center called 3C 189. According to a study, in which exploring the magnetic environment was done, researchers learnt that the rotation measure was complex, which they gave as evidence for anisotropic fluctuations in two regions. An unusual stripe was shown along its jet axis, which has a low uniform rotation measure (RM) in the approaching lobe and arc-like RM structures, showing sign reversals in receding lobes. They found that the amplitude across its source is inconsistent and believed it is most likely caused by compressed gas around the lobe's leading edges.

Another study shows the x-ray emitting atmospheres of NGC 2484 which indicates it as a low-power radio galaxy. There were multiple x-ray components present and each gas component has a wide range of liner sizes that follow cluster X-ray luminosity and temperature correlations, hinting no relationship of its presence and its gas friction, although the intergalactic medium is enough to confine the outer radio structures.

NGC 2484 is one of the 8 galaxies to be included as part of the 4th Fermi Point Source Catalogue, among them: MRK 421, MRK 501, NGC 315, 3C 264, 3C 274 and FR 0 galaxy, 4C 39.12. Most of them have low redshifts. It also produces extragalactic jets and is the source of gamma-rays.
