= High-energy astrophysics =

Study of astronomical objects that release highly energetic electromagnetic radiation

High-energy astrophysics or high-energy astronomy is the study of astronomical objects that release electromagnetic radiation of highly energetic wavelengths. It includes X-ray astronomy, gamma-ray astronomy, extreme UV astronomy, neutrino astronomy, and studies of cosmic rays.

Astronomical objects commonly studied in this field may include black holes, neutron stars, active galactic nuclei, supernovae, kilonovae, supernova remnants, and gamma-ray bursts.

== Missions ==
Some space and ground-based telescopes that have studied high-energy astrophysics include the following:

- AGILE
- AMS-02
- AUGER
- CALET
- Chandra
- Fermi
- HAWC
- H.E.S.S.
- IceCube
- INTEGRAL
- MAGIC
- NuSTAR
- Proton
- Swift
- TA
- XMM-Newton
- VERITAS
