= PKS 2142−758 =

Blazar in the constellation of Octans

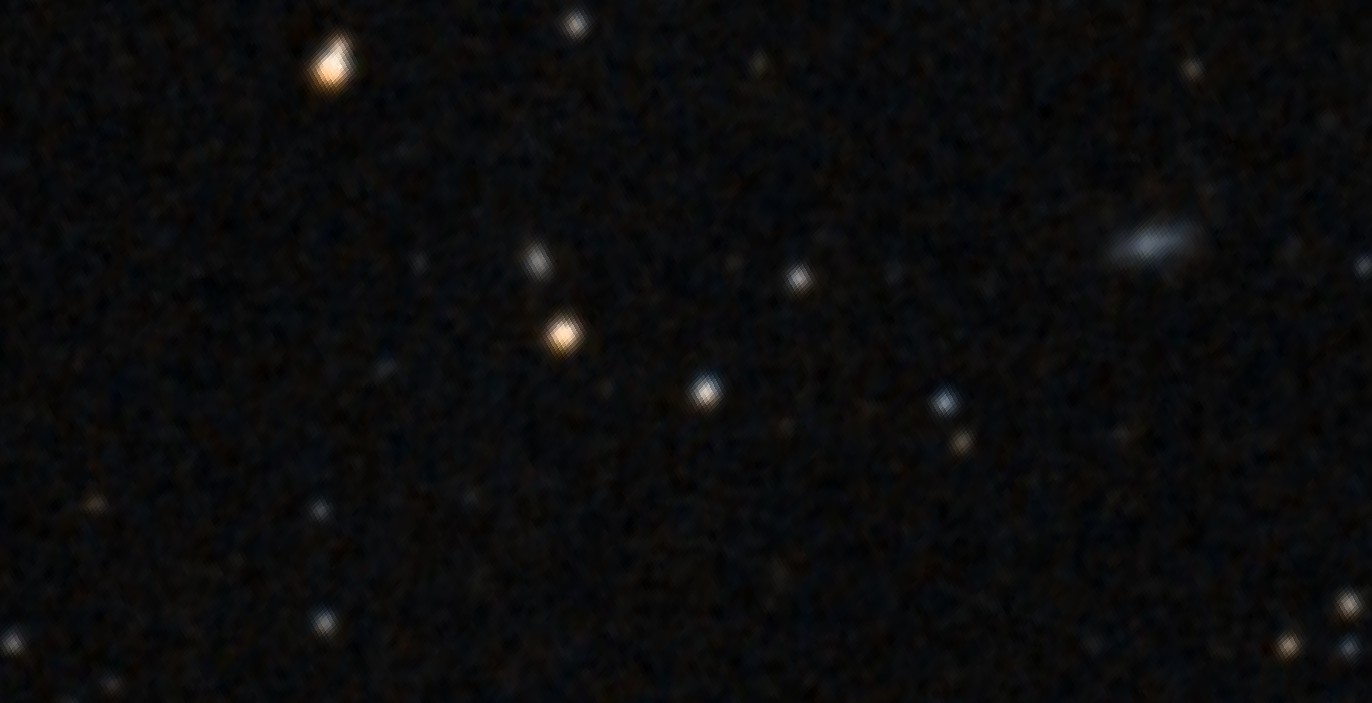
- The blazar PKS 2142−758

Observation data (J2000.0 epoch)
- Constellation: Octans
- Right ascension: 21^{h} 47^{m} 12.730^{s}
- Declination: −75° 36′ 13.224″
- Redshift: 1.144000
- Heliocentric radial velocity: 342,963 km/s
- Distance: 8.477 Gly
- Apparent magnitude (V): 17.30
- Apparent magnitude (B): 17.79

Characteristics
- Type: RLQ

Other designations
- PKS 2142−75, PMN J2147−7536, 2MASS J21471272−7536130, BZQ J2147−7536, LEDA 2831015, IERS B2141−758

PKS 2142−758 is a blazar located in the southern constellation of Octans. Its redshift is (z) 1.144 and it was first discovered as a quasar candidate during the Parkes 2700 MHz survey by astronomers in 1979. The radio spectrum of PKS 2141−758 is flat, making it a flat-spectrum radio quasar. It displays redder-stable-when brighter (RSWB) spectral variations.

== Description ==
PKS 2142−758 is highly active on the electromagnetic spectrum. It was found to produce several significant gamma-ray flares detected through MeV and GeV energy ranges, which started on April 4, 2010. During observations by the AGILE satellite at that time, the daily flux of the source reached 2.6 ± 0.9 10^{−6} photons cm^{−2} s^{−1}. Another flare was detected on May 20, 2014, by the Large Area Telescope aboard the Fermi Gamma-ray Space Telescope, where the flux level reached 1.2 ± 0.3 × 10^{−6} photons cm^{−2} s^{−1}. Between December 2011 and January 2012, PKS 2142−758 was in a quiescent state with a 100 MeV to 300 GeV luminosity of 4.4 × 10^{48} erg s^{−1}. This makes it one of the most luminous sources observed.

A new flare was observed on November 7, 2014. When shown on a B-band optical curve, the flare was found to be the brightest known with a magnitude of 16.585. It lasted for 1,610 days, during which its light variation magnitude reached a peak of 1.329. A study published in May 2025 also showed most of the optical outbursts in PKS 2142−758 occurred at a large distance from the torus area.

The source of PKS 2142−758 is found mainly dominated by a radio core structure according to Very Long Baseline Interferometry radio imaging at first-epoch. There is a faint jet extending toward the east.

A central supermassive black hole mass has been found for PKS 2142−758. Based on data observations, it is estimated at 1 billion M_{☉} with total luminosity of 6.5 × 10^{45} erg s^{−1}.It has an accretion disk with its inner radius being 1.5 × 10^{14} cm or 6 R_{g} and the outer radius of the disk is approximately 1 × 10^{4} R_{g}. The temperature of the disk is in the range of 1.3-1.4 × 10^{4} k (± 0.04).
