= SHBL J001355.9−185406 =

BL Lacertae object in the constellation Cetus

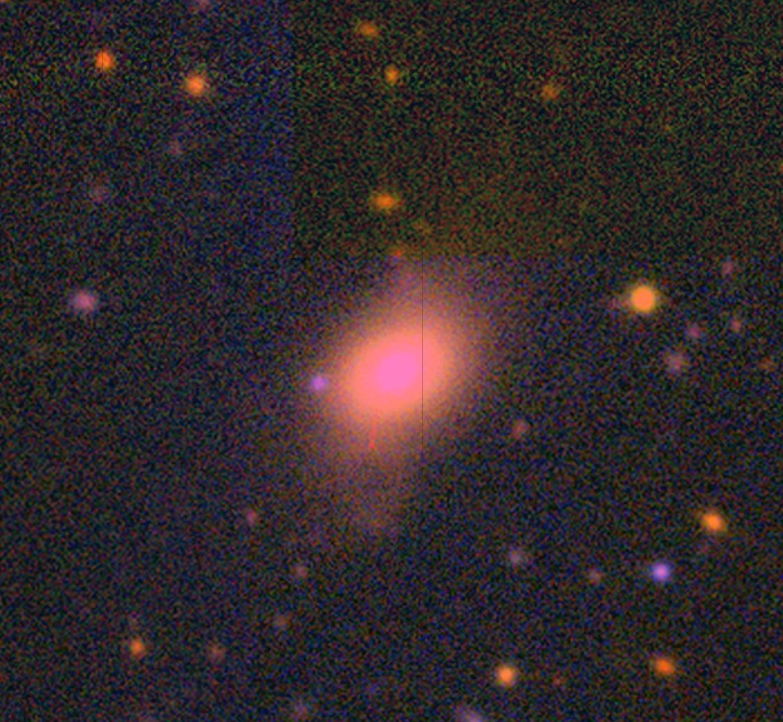
- DESI Legacy Surveys image of SHBL J001355.9−185406

Observation data (J2000.0 epoch)
- Constellation: Cetus
- Right ascension: 00^{h} 13^{m} 56.07^{s}
- Declination: −18° 54′ 06.90″
- Redshift: 0.094846
- Heliocentric radial velocity: 28,434 ± 45 km/s
- Distance: 1,369.8 ± 95.9 Mly (419.97 ± 29.41 Mpc)
- magnitude (J): 13.63

Characteristics
- Type: BLLAC
- Apparent size (V): ~203,000 ly (62.1 kpc) (estimated)

Other designations
- 2MASS J00135604-1854067, 6dF J0013560-185407, LEDA 862325, NVSS J001356-185406, OCARS 0011-191

SHBL J001355.9−185406 is a BL Lacertae object located in the constellation of Cetus. The redshift of the object is (z) 0.094 and it was first discovered as a bright astronomical X-ray source by astronomers in 2000 where it was identified with a galaxy with an apparent magnitude of 17.0. This object has also been described as a blazar with an active galactic nucleus.

== Description ==
SHBL J001355.9−185406 is categorized as a blazar of low-redshift. It was shown to display gamma-rays at high energies between July 2008 and August 2010, observed by High Energy Stereoscopic System (HESS), however it did not shown any signs of extreme variability when observed by Automatic Telescope for Optical Monitoring (ATOM). The mean R-band flux was calculated around 15.41 ± 0.03 magnitude while the B-band flux was at 17.52 ± 0.05 magnitude. One near-brightening event was shown on November 10, 2010, with the flux at near-infrared range ballooning up by 0.7 magnitudes in brightness.

Radio observations made in 2014 at low frequency high resolutions, have found the radio structure is mainly compact with a single radio core component and a radio jet-like or a lobe feature described as one sided that is extending southwest from the central nucleus. The feature is found as edge-brightened and has a projected size of about 344 kiloparsecs and a total luminosity of around 5 × 10^{39} erg/s. Further evidence suggests the structure is further divided into three different distinctive components with a steep radio spectrum.
