= Very-high-energy gamma ray =

Gamma radiation with photon energies between 100GeV and 100TeV

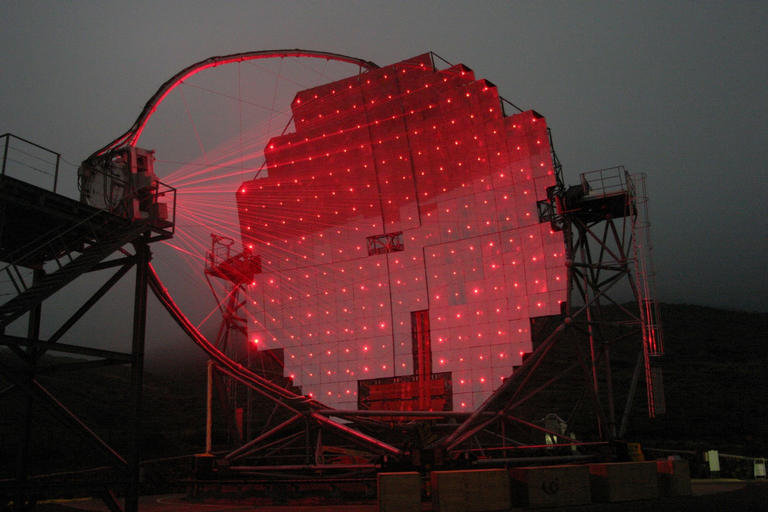
The MAGIC telescope is used to detect very-high-energy gamma rays

A very-high-energy gamma ray (VHEGR) is gamma radiation with photon energies of 100 GeV (gigaelectronvolt) to 100 TeV (teraelectronvolt), i.e., 10^{11} to 10^{14} electronvolts. This is approximately equal to wavelengths between 10^{−17} and 10^{−20} meters, or frequencies of 2 × 10^{25} to 2 × 10^{28} Hz. Such energy levels have been detected from emissions from astronomical sources such as some binary star systems containing a compact object. For example, radiation emitted from Cygnus X-3 has been measured at ranges from GeV to exaelectronvolt-levels. Other astronomical sources include BL Lacertae, 3C 66A Markarian 421 and Markarian 501. Various other sources exist that are not associated with known bodies. For example, the H.E.S.S. catalog contained 64 sources in November 2011.

== Detection ==
Instruments to detect this radiation commonly measure the Cherenkov radiation produced by secondary particles generated from an energetic photon entering the Earth's atmosphere. This method is called imaging atmospheric Cherenkov technique or IACT. A high-energy photon produces a cone of light confined to 1° of the original photon direction. About 10,000 m^{2} of the Earth's surface is lit by each cone of light. A flux of 10^{−7} photons per square meter per second can be detected with current technology, provided the energy is above 0.1 TeV. Instruments include the planned Cherenkov Telescope Array, GT-48 in Crimea, MAGIC on La Palma, High Energy Stereoscopic System (HESS) in Namibia VERITAS and Chicago Air Shower Array which closed in 2001. Cosmic rays also produce similar flashes of light, but can be distinguished based on the shape of the light flash. Also having more than one telescope simultaneously observing the same spot can help exclude cosmic rays. Extensive air showers of particles can be detected for gamma rays above 100 TeV. Water scintillation detectors or dense arrays of particle detectors can be used to detect these particle showers.

Air showers of elementary particles made by gamma rays can also be distinguished from those produced by cosmic rays by the much greater depth of shower maximum, and the much lower quantity of muons.

Very-high-energy gamma rays are too low energy to show the Landau–Pomeranchuk–Migdal effect. Only magnetic fields perpendicular to the path of the photon causes pair production, so that photons coming in parallel to the geomagnetic field lines can survive intact until they meet the atmosphere. These photons that come through the magnetic window can make a Landau–Pomeranchuk–Migdal shower.

Class	Energy			Frequency	Wavelength	Comparison	Properties
Class	SI prefix eV	eV	SI prefix J	Hertz	meters	Comparison	Properties
Near infrared	1	1	0.1602 aJ	241.8 THz	1.2398 μm		for comparison
Very-high-energy gamma rays	100 GeV	1 × 10^{11}	0.01602 μJ	2.42 × 10^{25} Hz	1.2 × 10^{−17} m	Z boson	
Very-high-energy gamma rays	1 TeV	1 × 10^{12}	0.1602 μJ	2.42 × 10^{26} Hz	1.2 × 10^{−18} m	flying mosquito	produces Cherenkov light
Very-high-energy gamma rays	10 TeV	1 × 10^{13}	1.602 μJ	2.42 × 10^{27} Hz	1.2 × 10^{−19} m		air shower reaches ground
Very-high-energy gamma rays	100 TeV	1 × 10^{14}	0.01602 mJ	2.42 × 10^{28} Hz	1.2 × 10^{−20} m	ping pong ball falling off a bat	causes nitrogen to fluoresce
Ultra-high-energy gamma rays	100 TeV	1 × 10^{14}	0.01602 mJ	2.42 × 10^{28} Hz	1.2 × 10^{−20} m	ping pong ball falling off a bat	causes nitrogen to fluoresce
Ultra-high-energy gamma rays	1 PeV	1 × 10^{15}	0.1602 mJ	2.42 × 10^{29} Hz	1.2 × 10^{−21} m		
Ultra-high-energy gamma rays	10 PeV	1 × 10^{16}	1.602 mJ	2.42 × 10^{30} Hz	1.2 × 10^{−22} m	potential energy of golf ball on a tee	
Ultra-high-energy gamma rays	100 PeV	1 × 10^{17}	0.01602 J	2.42 × 10^{31} Hz	1.2 × 10^{−23} m		penetrate geomagnetic field
Ultra-high-energy gamma rays	1 EeV	1 × 10^{18}	0.1602 J	2.42 × 10^{32} Hz	1.2 × 10^{−24} m		
Ultra-high-energy gamma rays	10 EeV	1 × 10^{19}	1.602 J	2.42 × 10^{33} Hz	1.2 × 10^{−25} m	air rifle shot	

== Importance ==
Very-high-energy gamma rays are of importance because they may reveal the source of cosmic rays. They travel in a straight line (in space-time) from their source to an observer. This is unlike cosmic rays which have their direction of travel scrambled by magnetic fields. Sources that produce cosmic rays will almost certainly produce gamma rays as well, as the cosmic ray particles interact with nuclei or electrons to produce photons or neutral pions which in turn decay to ultra-high-energy photons.

The ratio of primary cosmic ray hadrons to gamma rays also gives a clue as to the origin of cosmic rays. Although gamma rays could be produced near the source of cosmic rays, they could also be produced by interactions with the cosmic microwave background by way of the Greisen–Zatsepin–Kuzmin limit cutoff above 50 EeV.
