= PKS 0346−27 =

Blazar in the constellation of Fornax

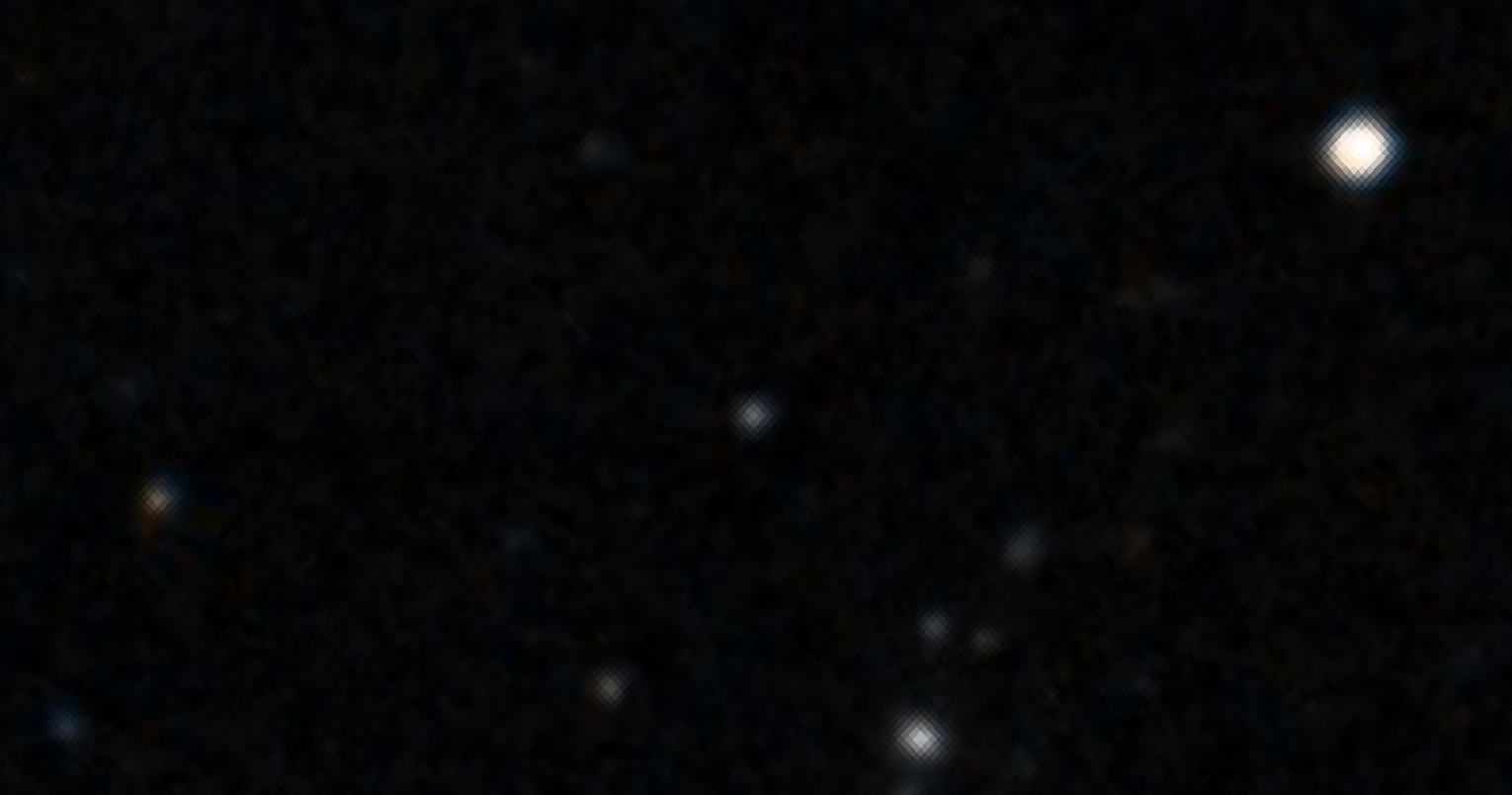
- The blazar PKS 0346−27

Observation data (J2000.0 epoch)
- Constellation: Fornax
- Right ascension: 03^{h} 48^{m} 38.14^{s}
- Declination: −27° 49′ 13.56″
- Redshift: 0.991000
- Heliocentric radial velocity: 297,094 km/s
- Distance: 7.891 Gly
- Apparent magnitude (V): 18.63
- Apparent magnitude (B): 20.08

Characteristics
- Type: FSRQ

Other designations
- 6dF J0348381−274914, PKS 0346−279, LEDA 2823683, OE −278, NVSS J034838−274914, WMAP 129, 4FGL J0348.6−2749

PKS 0346−27 is a blazar located in the constellation of Fornax. Its redshift is (z) 0.991 and as such lies at a distance of 7.8 billion light-years from Earth. This object is also classified as a flat-spectrum radio quasar with its radio spectrum seeming to appear flat with its radio source being first identified in 1966 by astronomers.

== Description ==
PKS 0346−27 is highly active on the electromagnetic spectrum in terms of emission of gamma-rays, although it can be categorized as a Low-Synchrotron-Peaked Blazar during its quiescent period because of the low spectral energy distribution peak. On February 2, 2018, it was shown to be in a high-flux state with its gamma-ray flux reaching levels of 1.0 ± 0.2 × 10^{−6} photons cm^{−2} s-1 upon detection by Fermi Gamma-ray Space Telescope. The next time the object displayed immense activity, was on April 24, 2019, where it reached a new historic high gamma-ray flux level of 3.2 ± 0.3 × 10^{−6} photons cm^{−2} s^{−1}. Subsequently, it displayed more renewed activity recorded in February 2020 and on November 24, 2021. An optical flare was also observed, in addition to gamma-rays where the object brightened in brightness.

Because of its powerful activity, PKS 0346−27 has been studied in detail. Data from a multiwavelength temporal and spectral study showed the object had multiple flaring episodes based on its gamma-ray light curve analysis from data collected over more than 2 years, with its minimum variability time estimated as 1.34 ± 0.3 days, indicating the source of PKS 0346−27 is compact. Astronomers also suggested the variability of the flares were caused by emission region interactions through stationary shock waves.

It is suggested PKS 0346−27 is a very-high energy emitter. Based on results, it underwent significant flaring activity on November 2, 2021, with a daily flux level of 1.8 ± 0.2 × 10^{−6} photons cm^{−2} s^{−1}, an increase of 200 folds since its average flux measured by fourth Fermi-LAT catalogue. The spectral index of the object measured by High Energy Stereoscopic System (HESS) was shown to have a soft index with a unit greater than four.

A quasi-periodic oscillation was detected in PKS 0346−27 during the observations conducted between December 2018 and January 2022. Results showed the periodicity is 100 days long and was likely caused by enhanced radio emission travelling in a helical direction inside a curved radio jet. The supermassive black hole mass was found to be 9.48 × 10^{9} M_{☉}.
