= IFAE =

Spanish-based research consortium

The Institute for High Energy Physics (Institut de Fisica d'Altes Energies, IFAE) of Barcelona, Catalonia, Spain, is a Public Consortium between the Generalitat de Catalunya (Government of the Autonomous Community of Catalonia) and the Universitat Autònoma de Barcelona (UAB). It was formally created on July 16, 1991, by Act number 159/1991 of the Generalitat. As an organization it is independent from both the UAB and the Generalitat, ruled by its own Statutes, and governed by a Governing Board. It is located on the campus of UAB in Bellaterra, Barcelona.

IFAE maintains its own Titular Personnel alongside Associated Personnel comprising members from the Physics Department of UAB engaged in Particle Physics research. Additionally, IFAE has established an agreement with Universitat de Barcelona, dated 8/7/1992, enabling faculty members of the university involved in Particle Physics research to also serve as Associated Personnel at IFAE.

The IFAE is also ascribed to the UAB as a University Institute (Act number 231/1995 of the Generalitat) which allows its members to teach in its Doctoral Programme in Physics, and thus benefits from a productive symbiotic relationship with this major education and research institution.

The institute is dedicated to forefront experimental and theoretical research in the fields of high energy physics and high energy astrophysics as well as in related technologies.

== Current projects ==
- Detector construction, algorithm development and Monte Carlo simulation for the ATLAS experiment at the Large Hadron Collider (LHC) under construction at the CERN;
- Experiment design and construction of the MAGIC high energy gamma-ray telescope, under operation since 2004 in the Canary Islands, Spain;
- Design of the Cherenkov Telescope Array, a matrix of Cherenkov Telescopes ten times more sensitive than MAGIC.
- Development of a novel X-ray detector technique for use in medical imaging;
- Analysis of data from the T2K experiment in Japan.
- Development of an Information Data Grid in connection with the LHC computing;
- A number of projects in theoretical Particle Physics.
