= 4C +71.07 =

Quasar in the constellation Ursa Major

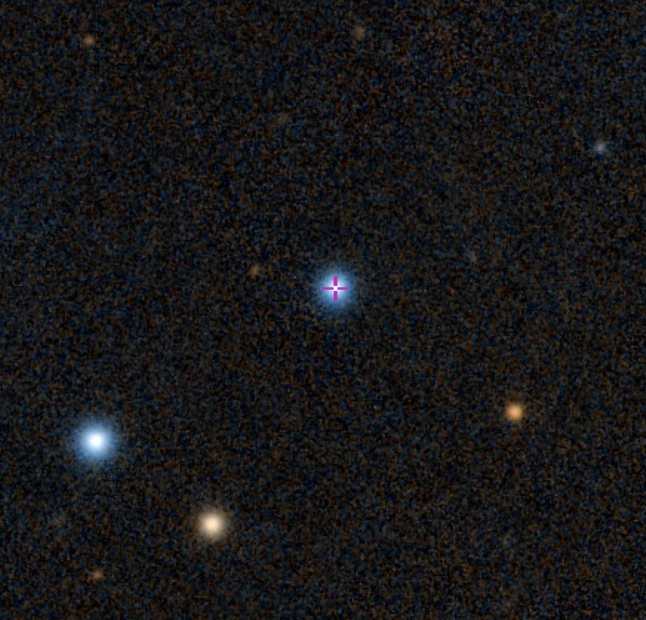
- Pan-STARRS image of 4C +71.07

Observation data (J2000.0 epoch)
- Constellation: Ursa Major
- Right ascension: 08h 41m 24.365s
- Declination: +70d 53m 42.17s
- Redshift: 2.172000
- Heliocentric radial velocity: 651,149 km/s
- Distance: 10.7 Gly (light travel time distance)
- Apparent magnitude (V): 0.54
- Apparent magnitude (B): 0.43
- Surface brightness: 17.3

Characteristics
- Type: Blazar, LPQ

Other designations
- NVSS J084124+705341, RBS 717, PGC 2821816, 1ES 0836+710, 6C B083622.5+710421, 8C 0836+710, S5 0836+71, TXS 0836+710, WMAP 089

4C +71.07 known as S5 0836+71, is a quasar located in the constellation Ursa Major. Based on its high redshift, the object is located 10.7 billion light-years away from Earth and such, classified as a blazar of the flat-spectrum radio quasar type, and features a radio jet.

== Redshift estimates of 4C +71.07 ==
Earlier redshift estimations of 4C +71.07 are calculated. In the 1993 study published by Stickel and Kuelr, the quasar is estimated to be located at z = 2.172 From its broad emission lines of C IV λ1549 and C III] λ1909, Lawrence et al. (1996), puts 4C +71.07 at z = 2.18032 while McIntosh et al. (1999), derived a systemic redshift of z = 2.218 from the [O III] λ5007 narrow line in H-band spectra.

A further detailed investigation of the spectroscopic properties of 4C +71.07 is presented by Raiteri et al. (in preparation), which researchers estimated a systemic redshift of z = 2.213 from the Balmer Hα and Hβ broad emission lines. From Stickel and Kuelr's study and by NASA/IPAC, the redshift of 4C +71.07 is confirmed at z = 2.172 based on the absorption line at ~5360 Å, which was attributed to Mg II λλ2796, 2803. This was confirmed by Scott, Bechtold & Dobrzycki (2000), who found a number of other absorbers at redshifts z = 1.4256, 1.6681, 1.7331, and 2.1800.

== Characteristics ==
The active galactic nucleus in 4C +71.07 is known to be the brightest and farthest, so far detected above the range of 20 keV. From the BATSE Earth occultation data, searching for emissions from 4C 71.07 during nearly 3 yr of observations, the mean source flux over the whole period in the BATSE energy range is 20–100 keV is (1.32±0.11)×10^{10} ergs·cm^{−2}·s^{−1}, corresponding to a luminosity of 2×10^{48} ergs·s^{−1}. Using the BATSE light curve, 4C +71.07 shows several flarelike events, one of which (in January 1996) is associated with an optical flare (R=16.1) but with a delay of 55 days. Moreover, the optical radiation in 4C +71.07, is dominated by its quasar-like emission.

Although the source has unusually strong polarization from 21 cm (6.8%) down to 9 mm (9.5%), 4C +71.07 is classified as a low-polarization quasar (LPQ) as the polarization is only 1.1%. The quasar has a 5 GHz flux greater than 1 Jy, and has both stationary and superluminally moving components in a bright one-sided jet emerging from its core.

4C +71.07 has been monitored since 1989 in the optical band and found to display at least two flares, one in February 1992 and another in November 1995. Typically the maximum brightness in R magnitude, is around 16.116.5 with a R 1.3 from minimum to maximum. The 1992 flare may also have been detected at millimeter and centimeter frequencies, but with a delay of 0.10.5 yr. At soft X-ray energies (0.12 keV), the source underwent a flux decrease by a factor of 2 between March and November 1992, without any spectral change, implying a high flux level close to the optical flaring period; the source was still dim when reobserved by the Advanced Satellite for Cosmology and Astrophysics in March 1995.

4C +71.07 has also been observed by EGRET on different occasions but not always detected. In particular, soon after the optical flare observed in 1992 the gamma-ray flux was also high. Very long baseline interferometry (VLBI) monitoring of the source has further indicated the ejection of a new jet component shortly after the time of the gamma/X-ray/optical/radio outburst.

The gamma-ray source spectrum is among the steepest at these energies ( = 2.4). It is quite a bright source in the gamma-ray domain with a 50200 MeV flux of 1.5 × 10^{−10} ergs cm^{−2} s^{−1} and an isotropic luminosity of 2.2 × 10^{48} ergs s^{−1}. However, the gamma radiation is likely to be beamed.

== Further study on 4C +71.07 ==
A study done by Asada et al. (2010), shows researchers inferring a Faraday rotation measure gradient from multifrequency VLBI polarimetry, suggesting a helical magnetic field for the jet of 4C +71.07. Evidences in favor of a helical jet structure, were presented also by Perucho et al. (2012a) based on very long baseline interferometry data. From the absence of a hotspot in the arcsec jet radio structure, Perucho et al. (2012a) concluded that the jet likely loses collimation and gets disrupted by the growth of helical instabilities. The conclusion from Perucho et al. (2012a), mentions that the jet likely loses collimation and gets disrupted by the growth of helical instabilities.

Another study from Akyuz et al. (2013), analyzed the multifrequency behavior of the source during both a quiescent state in 2008–2011 and an active state in 2011, finds that the γ-ray emission correlates with the optical, but not its radio emission and that the γ-ray spectrum becomes curved in active states.

== Observation ==
Between October 27–29 and November 8–10, 2015, 4C +71.07 was detected by the AGILE gamma-ray satellite when the blazar reached a gamma-ray flux (E>100 MeV) of the order of 1.2×10^{−6} ph·cm^{−2}·s^{−1} and 3.1×10^{−6} ph·cm^{−2}·s^{−1}, respectively. Not to mention, 4C +71.07 shows a prominent accretion disc bump peaking in the ultra-violet band, which makes this source an excellent candidate to investigate not only the jet emission but also the non thermal one.

During 2014–2016, the Whole Earth Blazar Telescope organized a multiwavelength observing campaign to study both the beamed and unbeamed properties of 4C +71.07. The results of the optical, near-infrared, and radio observations by researchers, complemented by ultraviolet and X-ray data from the Swift satellite and γ-ray data from the Fermi satellite, are presented. They found that the spectral energy distribution shows a prominent big blue bump and a strong Compton dominance.

Researchers also calculated that the best-guess density value for the hydrogen column through the analysis of X-ray spectra, is N_{H}^{best}=6.3×10^{20} cm^{−2}, but found out that the light curves do not show persistent correlations among flux changes at different frequencies. Even surprising, there is no correlation between polarization degree and flux.

Similarly, wide rotations of the electric vector polarization angle for 4C +71.07 do not seem to be connected with the source activity. But is characterized by extreme nuclear and jet properties. Integration of the thermal continuum traced by our big blue bump template allows them to estimate the disc bolometric luminosity, which is L_{disc} = 2.45 × 10^{47} ergs ^{−1} showing the Eddington ratio, high as 0.66. A jet bolometric luminosity integrating the nuclear-subtracted SED, obtaining L_{jet} = 9.42 × 10^{49} ergs ^{−1} ≈ (1–4) L_{disc}. The disc and jet luminosities of 4C +71.07 are found to fit well into the jet–disc relation for blazars, therefore confirming it at the highest energy values.

== Black hole ==
According to the study from Ghisellini et al. (2010), researchers estimate the supermassive black hole mass in 4C +71.07, to be 3 billion which is the size of 1.5 × 10^{18} cm, an accretion disc luminosity of 2.25 × 10^{47} ergs ^{−1}, with a bulk Lorentz factor of 14 at the jet dissipation radius of 5.40 × 10^{17} cm for a jet viewing angle of 3°.

Using the black hole mass, they were able derived an Eddington luminosity of L_{edd} = 2.49 × 10^{47} ergs ^{−1} and an Eddington ratio L_{disc}/L_{Edd} ≈ 1, which means that the radiation and gravitational forces are of the same order. They estimated the black hole luminosity of L_{BLR} = (1.52 + 0.14) × 10^{46} ergs ^{−1}, representing about 6 percent of the disc and Eddington luminosities. This identifies 4C +71.07, as one of the most luminous among the blazar nuclei.
