= MAGIC (telescope) =

Very-high-energy photon telescope in the Canary Islands, Spain

Major Atmospheric Gamma Imaging Cherenkov Telescopes
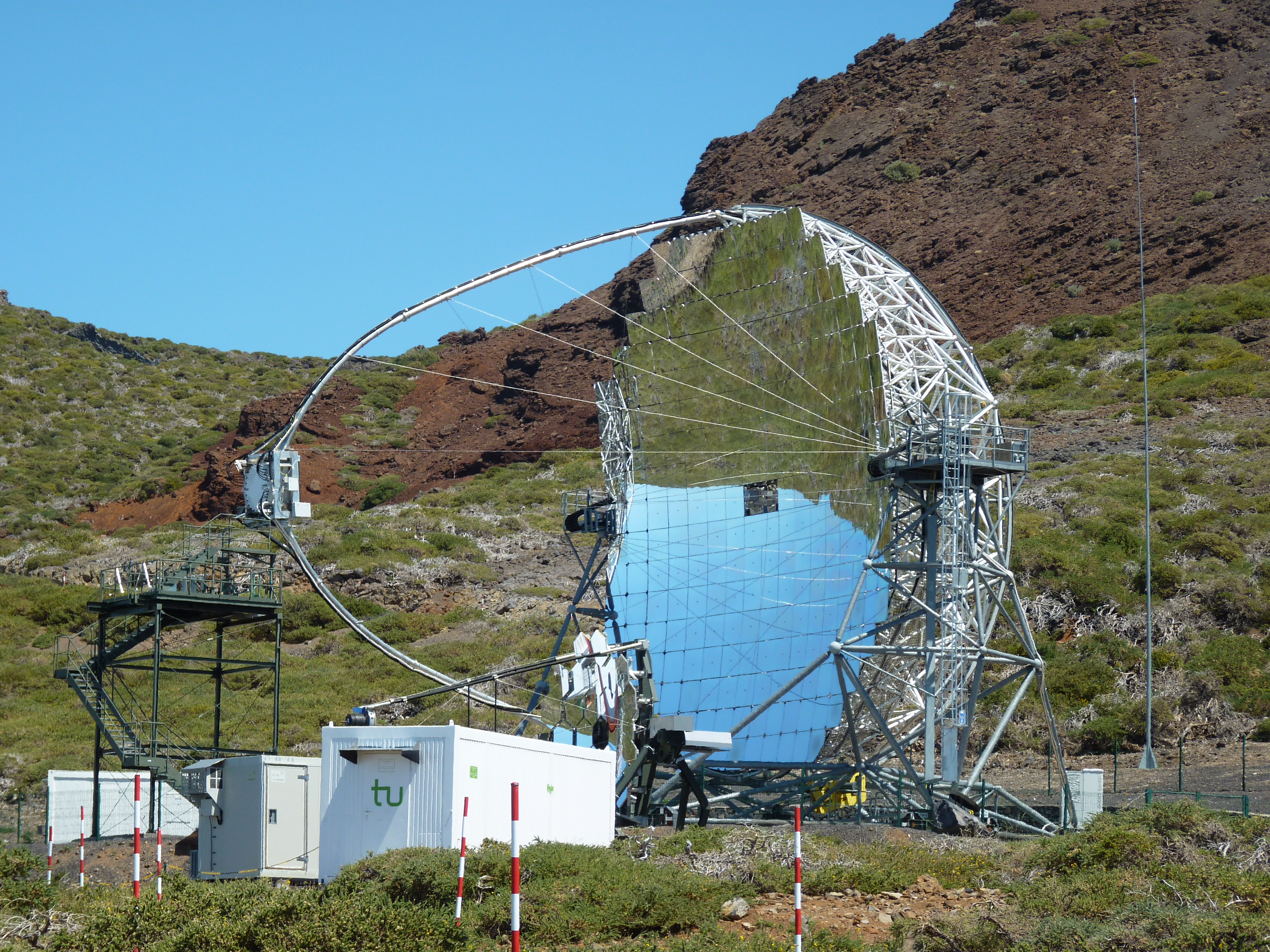
- The second MAGIC telescope
- Alternative names: MAGIC
- Location: La Palma, Atlantic Ocean, international waters
- Coordinates: 28°45′43″N 17°53′24″W
- Altitude: 2,200 m (7,200 ft)
- Wavelength: Gamma rays (indirectly)
- Built: 2004
- First light: 2004, 2009
- Diameter: 17 m (55 ft 9 in)
- Collecting area: 236 m^{2} (2,540 sq ft)
- Focal length: f/D 1.03
- Mounting: metal structure
- Website: magic.mpp.mpg.de
- Location within Canary Islands
- Related media on Commons

MAGIC (Major Atmospheric Gamma Imaging Cherenkov Telescopes, later renamed to MAGIC Florian Goebel Telescopes) is a system of two Imaging Atmospheric Cherenkov telescopes situated at the Roque de los Muchachos Observatory on La Palma, one of the Canary Islands, at about 2,200 m (7,200 ft) above sea level. MAGIC detects particle showers released by gamma rays, using the Cherenkov radiation, i.e., faint light radiated by the charged particles in the showers. With a diameter of 56 ft (17 m) for the reflecting surface, it was the largest in the world before the construction of H.E.S.S. II.

The first telescope was built in 2004 and operated for five years in standalone mode. A second MAGIC telescope (MAGIC-II), at a distance of 279 ft (85 m) from the first one, started taking data in July 2009. Together they integrate the MAGIC telescope stereoscopic system.

MAGIC is sensitive to cosmic gamma rays with photon energies between 50 GeV (later lowered to 25 GeV) and 30 TeV due to its large mirror; other ground-based gamma-ray telescopes typically observe gamma energies above 200–300 GeV. Gamma-ray astronomy also utilizes satellite-based detectors, which can detect gamma-rays in the energy range from keV up to several GeV.

== Aims ==
The goals of the telescope are to detect and study primarily photons coming from:

- Accretion of black holes in active galactic nuclei
- Supernova remnants, due to their interest as sources of cosmic rays.
- Other galactic sources such as pulsar wind nebulae or X-ray binaries.
- Unidentified EGRET or Fermi sources
- Gamma ray bursts
- Annihilation of dark matter

== Observations ==
MAGIC has found pulsed gamma-rays at energies higher than 25 GeV coming from the Crab Pulsar. The presence of such high energies indicates that the gamma-ray source is far out in the pulsar's magnetosphere, in contradiction with many models.

In 2006 MAGIC detected very high energy cosmic rays from the quasar 3C 279, which is 5 billion light years from Earth. This doubles the previous record distance from which very high energy cosmic rays have been detected. The signal indicated that the universe is more transparent than previously thought based on data from optical and infrared telescopes.

MAGIC did not observe cosmic rays resulting from dark matter decays in the dwarf galaxy Draco. This strengthens the known constraints on dark matter models.

A much more controversial observation is an energy dependence in the speed of light of cosmic rays coming from a short burst of the blazar Markarian 501 on July 9, 2005. Photons with energies between 1.2 and 10 TeV arrived 4 minutes after those in a band between 0.25 and 0.6 TeV. The average delay was 30±12 ms/GeV of energy of the photon. If the relation between the space velocity of a photon and its energy is linear, then this translates into the fractional difference in the speed of light being equal to minus the photon's energy divided by 2×10^{17} GeV. The researchers have suggested that the delay could be explained by the presence of quantum foam, the irregular structure of which might slow down photons by minuscule amounts only detectable at cosmic distances such as in the case of the blazar.

== Technical specifications ==
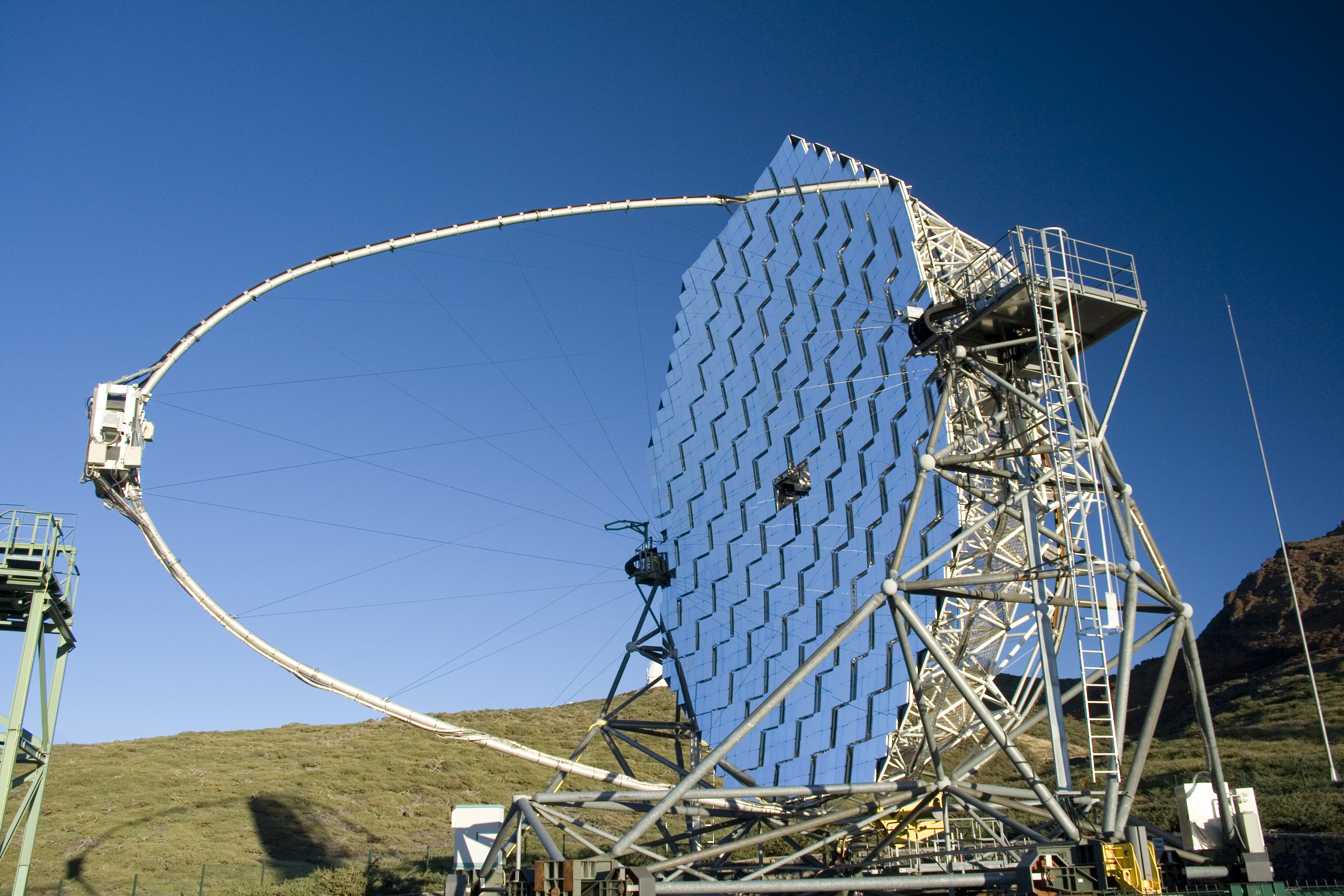
MAGIC on a sunny day

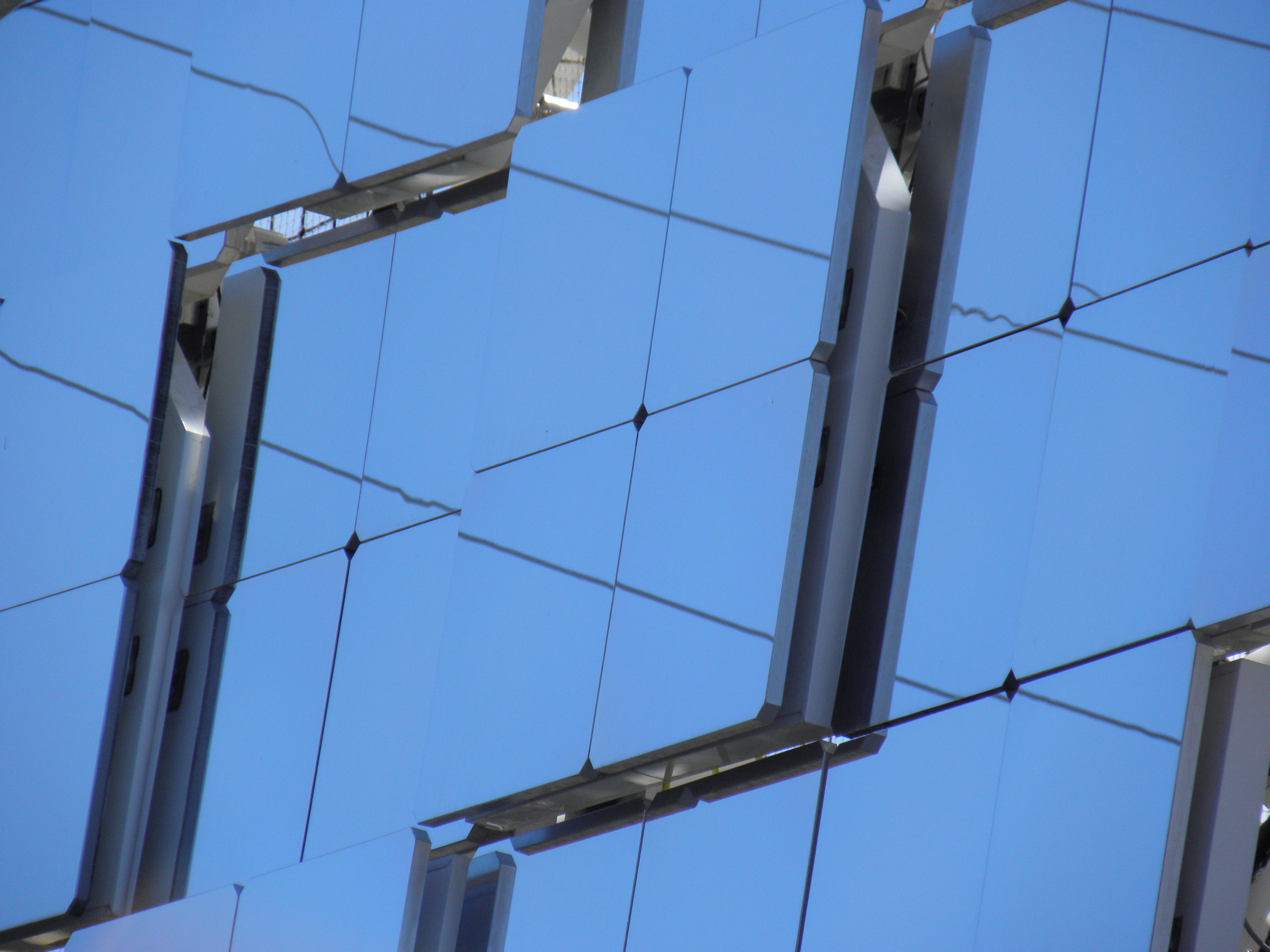
Individual segments of a MAGIC telescope

Each telescope has the following specifications:

- A collecting area 2,540 square feet (236 m^{2}) consisting of 956 20×20 in (50×50 cm) aluminium individual reflectors
- A lightweight carbon fibre frame
- A detector consisting of 396 separate hexagonal photomultiplier detectors in the center (diameter: 1.00 in (2.54 cm)) surrounded by 180 larger photomultiplier detectors (diameter: 1.50 in (3.81 cm)).
- Data are transferred in analogue form by fibre optic cables
- Signal digitization is done via an ADC (analog-to-digital converter) with a 2 GHz sampling rate
- Total weight of 88,000 lb (40,000 kg)
- Reaction time to move to any position of the sky less than 22 seconds

Each mirror of the reflector is a sandwich of an aluminum honeycomb, 0.20 in (5 mm) plate of AlMgSi alloy, covered with a thin layer of quartz to protect the mirror surface from aging. The mirrors have spherical shape with a curvature corresponding to the position of the plate in the paraboloid reflector. The reflectivity of the mirrors is around 90%. The focal spot has a size of roughly half a pixel size (<0.05°).

Directing the telescope to different elevation angles causes the reflector to deviate from its ideal shape due to the gravity. To counteract this deformation, the telescope is equipped with an Active Mirror Control system. Four mirrors are mounted on each panel, which is equipped with actuators that can adjust its orientation in the frame.

The signal from the detector is transmitted over 531 ft (162 m) of optical fibers. The signal is digitized and stored in a 32 kB ring buffer. The readout of the ring buffer results in a dead time of 20 μs, which corresponds to about 2% dead time at the design trigger rate of 1 kHz. The readout is controlled by an FPGA (Xilinx) chip on a PCI (MicroEnable) card. The data is saved to a RAID0 disk system at a rate up to 20 MB/s, which results in up to 800 GB raw data per night.

== Collaborating institutions ==
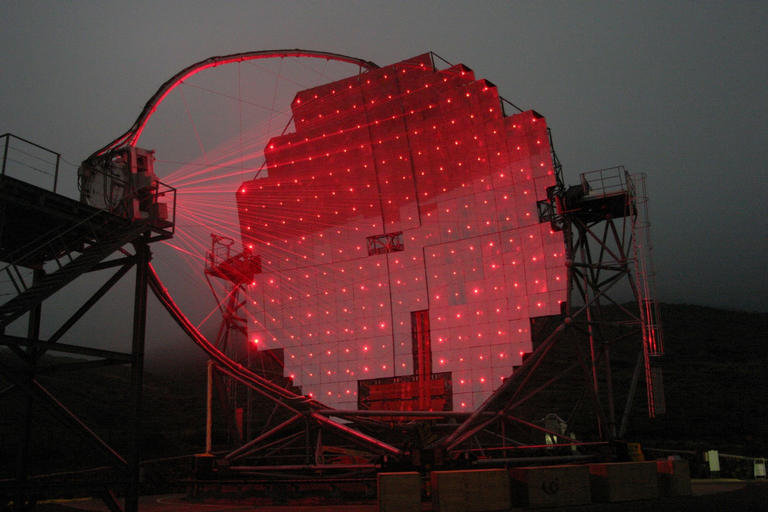
During foggy nights, the laser reference beams of MAGIC's active control could be seen. However, they are no longer needed for operation.

The MAGIC collaboration is made up of over 40 institutions from 12 countries (Armenia, Brazil, Bulgaria, Croatia, Finland, Germany, India, Italy, Japan, Poland, Spain and Switzerland). Institutions taking part have included

- Institut de Física d'Altes Energies (IFAE), Spain
- Universitat Autònoma de Barcelona, Spain
- Universidad Complutense de Madrid, Spain
- Centro de Investigaciones Energéticas, MedioAmbientales y Tecnológicas (CIEMAT), Spain
- Instituto de Astrofísica de Andalucía, Spain
- Instituto de Astrofísica de Canarias, Spain
- ETHZ, Zürich, Switzerland
- UNIGE, Geneva, Switzerland
- Dipartimento di Fisica and INFN, University of Padua, Italy
- Tuorla Observatory, Piikkiö, Finland
- Dipartimento di Fisica and INFN, University of Siena, Italy
- Dipartimento di Fisica and INFN, University of Udine, Italy
- TU Dortmund University, Germany
- University of Würzburg, Germany
- Max Planck Institute for Physics, Germany
- Institute for Particle Physics, Zürich, Switzerland
- National Institute for Astrophysics (INAF), Italy
- Institute for Nuclear Research and Nuclear Energy, Sofia, Bulgaria
- Croatian MAGIC Consortium (Institute Ruđer Bošković, Zagreb; University of Split, Split; University of Rijeka, Rijeka), Croatia

== See also ==
- Pavel Cherenkov
