= Imaging atmospheric Cherenkov telescope =

Device to detect very-high-energy gamma ray photons

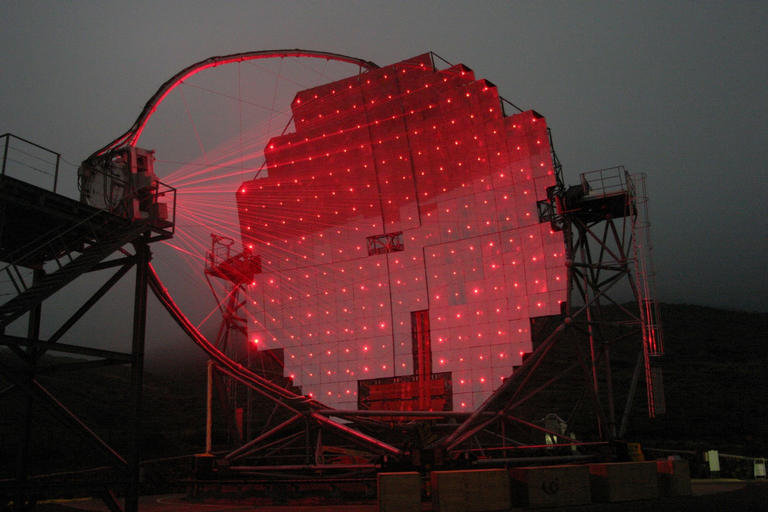
MAGIC, a Cherenkov telescope in operation on the Canary island of La Palma. On foggy nights, the lasers that are used to focus the mirrors can be seen.

An imaging atmospheric Cherenkov telescope (or technique), also known by the acronym IACT, is a device or method to detect very-high-energy gamma ray photons in the photon energy range of 50 GeV to 50 TeV.

As of 2017, there are four operating IACT systems: High Energy Stereoscopic System (H.E.S.S.), Major Atmospheric Gamma Imaging Cherenkov Telescopes (MAGIC), First G-APD Cherenkov Telescope (FACT), and Very Energetic Radiation Imaging Telescope Array System (VERITAS). The Major Atmospheric Cerenkov Experiment Telescope (MACE) is under construction in Hanle, Ladakh, India and is set to be the highest and second-largest IACT. The Cherenkov Telescope Array (CTA) is a multinational project to build next-generation IACTs and is scheduled to begin data collection in 2022.

== Background ==
Due to the rapidly falling flux of gamma-ray photons from cosmic sources in this energy regime, space-based detectors become ineffective due to their small collection areas which are often limited to some tens or hundreds of square centimeters. In the case of the IACT, the Earth's atmosphere is used as the detection medium, implying a collection area of many hundreds of square meters. This enables IACT instruments to detect gamma-ray photons in an energy regime inaccessible to space-based instruments.

== Technique ==
The IACT works by imaging the very short flash of Cherenkov radiation generated by the cascade of relativistic charged particles produced when a very-high-energy gamma ray strikes the atmosphere. This shower of charged particles, known as an Extensive Air Shower (EAS), is initiated at an altitude of 10–20 km. The incoming gamma-ray photon undergoes pair production in the vicinity of the nucleus of an atmospheric molecule. The electron-positron pair produced are of extremely high energy and immediately undergo Bremsstrahlung or "Braking Radiation". This radiation produced is itself extremely energetic, with many of the photons undergoing further pair production. A cascade of charged particles ensues which, due to its extreme energy, produces a flash of Cherenkov radiation lasting between 5 and 20 ns. The total area on the ground illuminated by this flash corresponds to many hundreds of square meters, which is why the effective area of IACT telescopes is so large.

The instrument used to detect the Cherenkov radiation usually comprises a large segmented mirror which reflects the Cherenkov light onto an array of photomultiplier tubes. The tubes are coupled to fast electronics which amplify, digitise and record the pattern or image of the shower. The most effective mode of operation is to use an array of such telescopes, which can be typically located 70 to 120 meters apart. The primary advantage of this mode of operation is that the energy threshold (the peak sensitivity) of the telescope can be lowered as local muons produced by cosmic ray induced showers can be eliminated. This is because the narrow Cherenkov light cone produced by local muons will only be recorded by a single telescope. The shower reconstruction and background rejection offered by an array of telescopes provides an order of magnitude increase in sensitivity and improved angular and energy resolution as compared to a single telescope. This advantage has been used to great effect by the H.E.S.S. telescope array which has detected several new sources of very high energy gamma-ray photons in recent years.

== History ==
The IACT was pioneered by the Whipple collaboration and led to the discovery of TeV emission from the Crab Nebula in 1989. The Whipple 10m telescope also discovered the first extra-galactic source of TeV emission with the detection of very-high-energy gamma-ray emission from the active galaxy Markarian 421. The HEGRA telescope array was the first system to use multiple telescopes, a technique known as stereoscopy. The MAGIC system at the Roque de los Muchachos Observatory in La Palma began with one 17 m telescope in 2004, to which a second 17 m telescope was added in 2009. The First G-APD Cherenkov Telescope (FACT) at the Roque de los Muchachos Observatory became operational in 2011. The H.E.S.S. collaboration has added to their system in Namibia a new 28 m IACT, currently the largest IACT telescope, which has been operational since July 2012.

== See also ==
- List of telescope types
- Pavel Cherenkov
