= 3C 66A =

Galaxy in constellation Andromeda

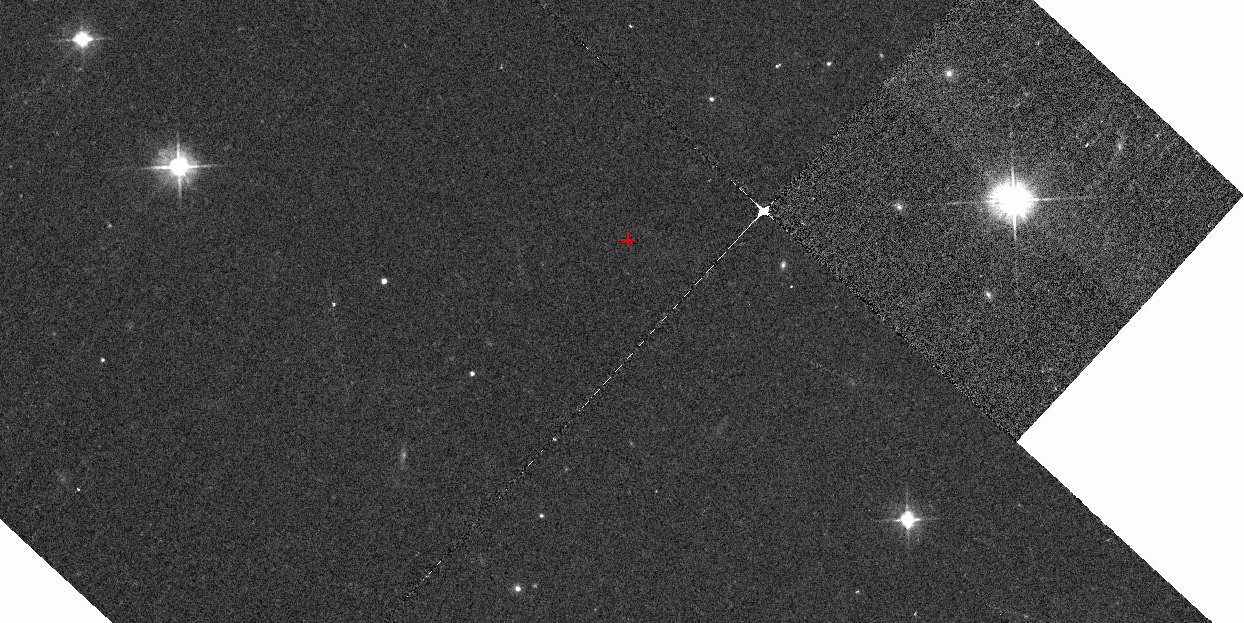
- Hubble Legacy Archive WFPC2 image of 3C 66A (brightest object on the far right)

Observation data (Epoch J2000)
- Constellation: Andromeda
- Right ascension: 02^{h} 22^{m} 39.612^{s}
- Declination: +43° 02′ 07.80″
- Redshift: 0.444
- Distance: 4.5 billion light-years (Light travel time); 5.4 billion light-years (present)
- Type: BLLAC
- Apparent magnitude (V): 15.5

Other designations
- 2E 558, 2EG J0220+4228, B3 0219+428A, QSO B0219+4248

3C 66A is a blazar located in the constellation Andromeda.

The "distance" of a far away galaxy depends on the distance measurement used. With a redshift of 0.444, light from this active galaxy is estimated to have taken around 4.5 billion years to reach Earth. But as a result of the expansion of the Universe, the present (co-moving) distance to this galaxy is about 5.4 billion light-years (1647 Mpc). Even at this great distance this blazar has an apparent magnitude of about 15.5. Although 0.444 is used as the common redshift value, 0.3347 is a new strict lower limit "inferred through observing the far-UV absorption by the low-z IGM."

3C 66A underwent an optical outburst in 2007 August, as monitored by the Tuorla blazar monitoring program. The event was monitored by the Whole Earth Blazar Telescope project.
