= AGILE (satellite) =

X-ray and gamma ray astronomical satellite

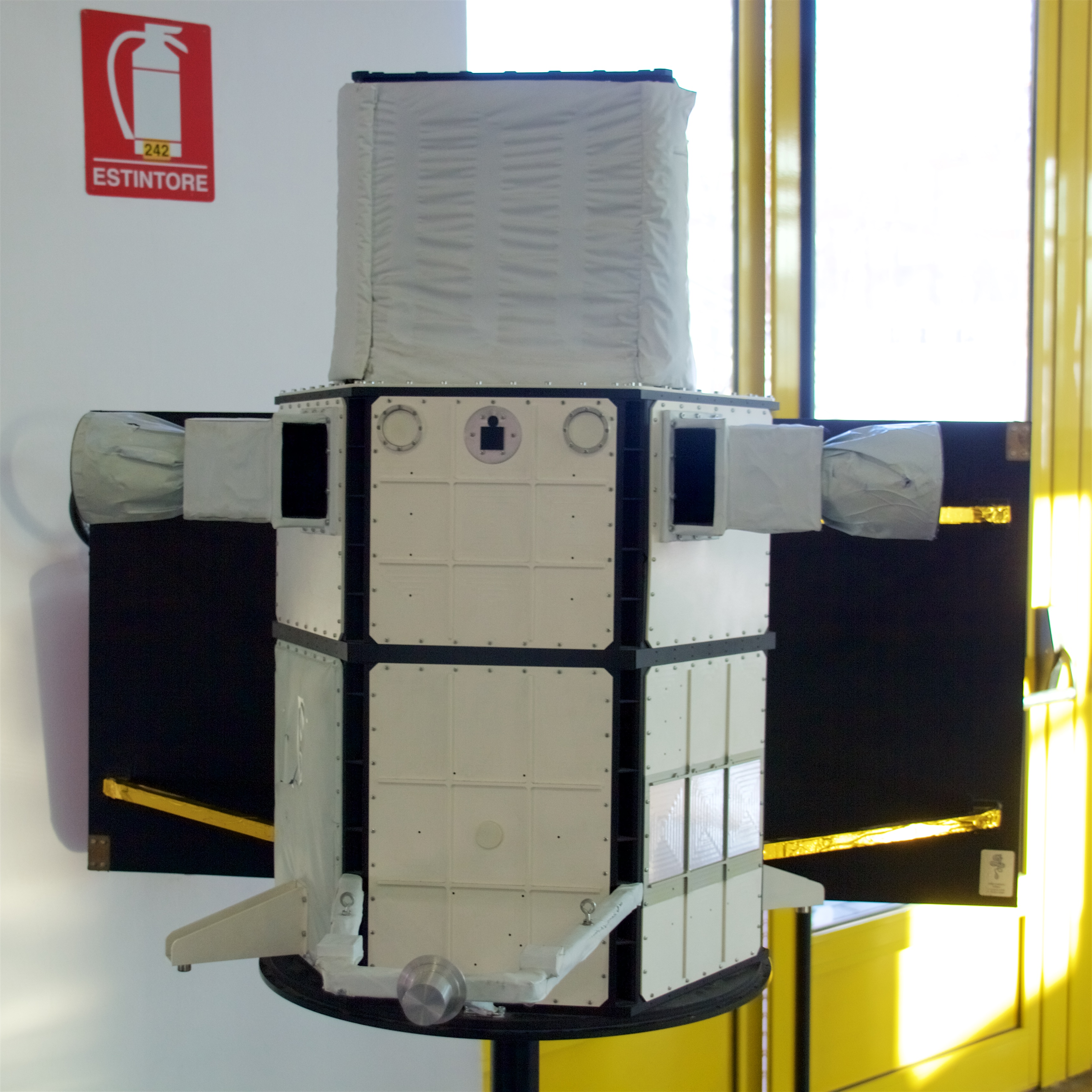
- A model of the satellite
- Mission type: Gamma-ray astronomy
- Operator: ASI
- COSPAR ID: 2007-013A
- SATCAT no.: 31135
- Website: agile.rm.iasf.cnr.it
- Mission duration: 3 years (planned); 16 years and 10 months

Spacecraft properties
- Manufacturer: OHB (in the Milano site), ex Compagnia Generale per lo Spazio
- Launch mass: 352 kilograms (776 lb)

Start of mission
- Launch date: 23 April 2007, 10:00:00 UTC
- Rocket: PSLV C8
- Launch site: Satish Dhawan SLP
- Contractor: ISRO

End of mission
- Decay date: February 18, 2024

Orbital parameters
- Reference system: Geocentric
- Regime: Low Earth
- Semi-major axis: 6,892.13 kilometres (4,282.57 mi)
- Eccentricity: 0.0017574
- Perigee altitude: 509 kilometres (316 mi)
- Apogee altitude: 533 kilometres (331 mi)
- Inclination: 2.47 degrees
- Period: 94.90 minutes
- Epoch: 4 December 2013, 04:13:37 UTC

AGILE (Italian: Astro-Rivelatore Gamma a Immagini Leggero) was an X-ray and gamma ray astronomical satellite of the Italian Space Agency (ASI). Launched in 2007, it de-orbited in February 2024.

== Objectives ==
AGILE's mission was to observe gamma-ray sources in the universe.

AGILE is an Italian high-energy astrophysics mission dedicated to the observation of the gamma-ray Universe. Its instrumentation is unprecedentedly light (100 kg) and the most compact ever operational for high-energy astrophysics (approximately a cube of about 60 cm size) with excellent detection and imaging capability.

Satellite data are collected by the ASI Broglio Space Centre in Malindi (Kenya), then transferred to the Satellite Operations Centre in Fucino, then transferred, preprocessed, and stored and analyzed at the ASI Science Data Center (ASDC) in Frascati. In parallel the pre-processed data are transferred at INAF/OAS Bologna for a science alert generation, thus assuring a response to gamma-ray detections, obtained by special quick look analysis programs and coordinated ground-based and space observation.

Key scientific objectives of the AGILE Mission include the study of:

- Active Galactic Nuclei
- Gamma-Ray Bursts
- X-ray and gamma galactic sources
- Non-identified gamma sources
- Diffuse galactic gamma emissions
- Diffuse extragalactic gamma emissions
- Fundamental physics

== Instrumentation ==
AGILE's instrumentation includes a Gamma Ray Imaging Detector (GRID) sensitive in the 30 MeV – 50 GeV energy range, a SuperAGILE (SA) hard X-ray monitor sensitive in the 18–60 keV energy range, a Mini-Calorimeter (MCAL) non-imaging gamma-ray scintillation detector sensitive in the 350 keV – 100 MeV energy range, and an Anti-coincidence System (AC), based on a plastic scintillator, to assist with suppressing unwanted background events.

The SuperAGILE SA is an instrument based on a set of four silicon strip detectors, each equipped with one-dimensional coded mask. The SA is designed to detect X-ray signals from known sources and burst-like signals. It provides long-term monitoring of flux and spectral features. MCAL can also effectively detect high-energy radiation bursts in its energy band.

== Launch and operations ==
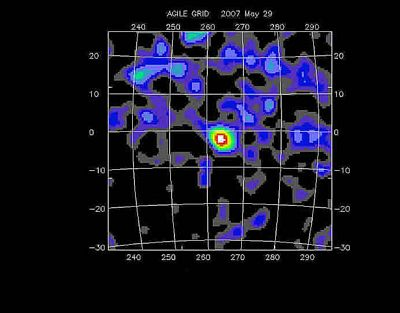
AGILE first image (Vela Pulsar)

AGILE was successfully launched on 23 April 2007, from the Indian base of Sriharikota and was inserted in an equatorial orbit with low particle background. It was the First flight of the PSLV with a foreign country's payload as a primary payload. Later that day, ASI made contact with AGILE; its signals were acquired by the ground station at the Broglio Space Centre near Malindi, Kenya and it was placed in a Sun-pointing mode.

== Results ==
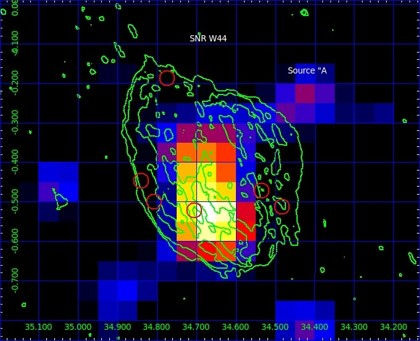
Gamma-ray image of the remnant of Supernova W44

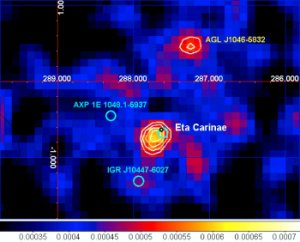
AGILE observation of Eta Carinae

During its operations AGILE surveyed the gamma-ray sky and detected many galactic and extragalactic sources: AGILE discovered gamma-ray emission from the microquasar Cygnus X-3, detected many bright blazars, discovered several new gamma-ray pulsars, surveyed the Galactic plane with simultaneous hard X-ray/gamma-ray capability, discovered emission up to 100 MeV from Terrestrial Gamma-Ray Flashes.

Some transient events detected by AGILE are associated with positions not consistent with a known source (Gamma Ray Burst) and have cosmological origins. Others are due to solar flares, while some are due to Earth atmosphere events (Terrestrial Gamma Flash).

The main results of the AGILE satellite are:

- Discovery of variable gamma-ray emission from the Crab Nebula: AGILE discovery that the archetypical source of gamma-ray astrophysics is not constant. Very rapid and intense gamma-ray flares from the inner Nebula driven by plasma instabilities. Theoretical particle acceleration models challenged and to be drastically revised. Consequences and broad applications in plasma physics experiments and theoretical studies of particle acceleration. For the discovery of gamma-ray flares from the Crab Nebula the 2012 Bruno Rossi Prize of the American Astronomical Society has been awarded to Marco Tavani and his team.
- Resolving the problem of the origin of cosmic-rays: First direct evidence of proton/ion gamma-ray emission by pion emission below 200 MeV in SNR W44. Combined gamma-ray and TeV emission from SNR IC 433 and W28.
- Discovery of gamma-ray emission from the black hole system Cygnus X-3: Discovery of extreme particle acceleration preceding relativistic jet plasmoid ejections from the black hole candidate Cyg X-3. Repeatedly detected by AGILE since 2008. First comprehensive survey of all Galactic microquasars by Super-AGILE and AGILE-GRID (Tavani et al., Nature, 462, 620, 2009).
- Discovery of TGF emission up to very high energies (100 MeV): Discovery of gamma-ray emission up to 100 MeV from terrestrial flashes associated with intense thunderstorms. Evidence for accelerating potentials larger than 100 MeV. Theoretical models of acceleration in lightning discharges to be drastically revised. Significant impacts for atmospheric physics and climate studies.
- The supermassive black hole 3C 454.3: Very active and variable blazar since 2007. AGILE first to announce gamma-ray super-flares in 2009 and 2010. The brightest ever gamma-ray source was measured in November 2010, almost 7 times more luminous that the Vela Pulsar.
- Soft gamma-ray pulsars (PSR 1509-58 and others): First post-EGRET gamma-ray pulsar discovered with the AGILE first light in 2007. Unveiling a class of "soft" gamma-ray pulsar barely detectable below 200 MeV, such as PSR B1509-58. Theoretical constraints on "photon splitting" in PSR magnetospheres.
- Unveiling relativistic particle winds: Nebular gamma-ray emission near the Vela Pulsar imaged by AGILE with high resolution. Clear evidence for different accelerated populations of particles.
- The brightest massive black hole of the BL Lac class: Detection of the strongest gamma-ray flare from a blazar of the BL Lac class, S5 0716+714 (believed to be driven by black-hole rotation). First theoretical determination of a system near the maximal limit of energy to be extracted from a rotating black hole.
- Gamma-ray flaring of the massive black hole Markarian 421: First multifrequency campaign in 2008 including X-ray (Super-AGILE), gamma-ray and TeV observations of the flaring blazar Mrk 421.

A key aspect of the AGILE data flow is the fastest gamma-ray alert monitoring system of the world. The overall gamma-ray alert monitoring system of AGILE is compound by two independent pipelines that process the data with different data quality results. The INAF/OAS Bologna pipeline processes the data in the fastest possible way, but it generates alert within 0.5–1 hour from the time of the last GRID event acquired in orbit. The ASDC pipeline is more accurate because all events are considered during the analysis but the alerts are generated 3–3.5 hours after.
