= Markarian 501 =

Galaxy in the constellation Hercules

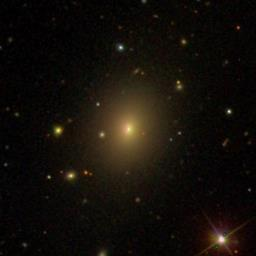
- Sloan Digital Sky Survey image of Mrk 501

Observation data (J2000 epoch)
- Constellation: Hercules
- Right ascension: 16^{h} 53^{m} 52.217^{s}
- Declination: 39° 45′ 36.61″
- Redshift: 0.032983±0.000045
- Heliocentric radial velocity: 9,888±13 km/s
- Galactocentric velocity: 10,057±15 km/s
- Distance: 497.7 ± 34.90 Mly (152.6 ± 10.7 Mpc)h^{−1}_{0.6774} (Comoving); 465 Mly (142.6 Mpc)h^{−1}_{0.6774} (Light-travel)
- Group or cluster: zw1707.6+4045
- Apparent magnitude (V): 13.29±0.13
- Apparent magnitude (B): 14.15±0.13
- Magnitude (J): 10.669±0.020
- Magnitude (H): 9.874±0.024
- Magnitude (K): 10.451±0.018

Characteristics
- Type: S0
- Size: 212,910 ly × 142,630 ly (65.28 kpc × 43.73 kpc) (diameter; 25.0 B-mag arcsec^{−2}) (Note: The quick-look major axis physical diameters given by NED of 50.89 by 34.10 kiloparsecs (166,000 by 111,000 light-years) and 54.29 by 45.60 kiloparsecs (177,000 by 149,000 light-years) were based on a distance estimate of 119 megaparsecs (388.1 million light-years). The quoted diameters in this infobox were based on NED's provided scale "Virgo + GA + Shapley" of 740 pc/arcsec multiplied by the given angular diameters.); 227,100 ly × 190,770 ly (69.63 kpc × 58.49 kpc) (diameter; "total" magnitude)
- Apparent size (V): 1.49514′ × 1.13526′
- Notable features: Brightest object in very-high-energy gamma rays

Other designations
- 4C 39.49, UGC 10599, PGC 59214

Markarian 501 (or Mrk 501) is an elliptical galaxy with a spectrum extending to the highest energy gamma rays. It is a blazar or BL Lac object, which is an active galactic nucleus with a jet that is shooting towards the Earth. The object has a redshift of z = 0.033.

Mrk 501 is an extremely variable source of gamma rays, undergoing violent outbursts. During an outburst in 1997, it was the brightest object in the sky in the very-high-energy gamma ray region of the spectrum, at energies above 10^{11} eV (100 GeV).

The galaxy hosting the blazar was studied and catalogued by Benjamin Markarian in 1974. It was first determined to be a very high energy gamma ray emitter in 1996 by John Quinn at the Whipple Observatory.

== Galaxy ==
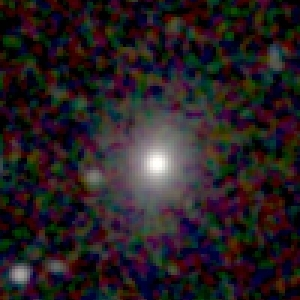
Mrk 501 (2MASS)

The elliptical galaxy is located in the constellation of Hercules at right ascension 16^{h} 53^{m} 52.217^{s} and declination 39° 45′ 36.61″. Its visible size appears to be 1.2 by 1 minute of arc.

== Gamma rays ==
The gamma rays from Mrk 501 are extremely variable, undergoing violent outbursts. The gamma ray spectrum of Mrk 501 shows two humps. One is below 1 keV and can be considered to be X-rays and the other is above 1 TeV. During flares and outbursts the peaks increase in power and frequency. Flares lasting 20 minutes with rise times of 1 minute have been measured by MAGIC. In these flares the higher energy gamma rays (of 1.2 TeV) were delayed 4 minutes over the 0.25 TeV gamma rays. This delay has led to various theories, including that space is bigger at small dimensions with a foamy quantum texture. The foam would create a variation in the speed of light for higher-energy light gamma-rays and the lower-energy radio waves and visible light. Such a variation would contradict Lorentz invariance, but could provide a clue for unification theory. Observations of Dr. Floyd Stecker of NASA's Goddard Space Flight Center of Mrk 501 and Mrk 421 demonstrated that there is no violation of Lorentz invariance. The galaxy is also variable in visible light between magnitude 14.5 and 13.6.

During the discovery observations flashes at the average rate of one in seven minutes were observed. Cosmic rays (that is, fermionic or massive cosmic rays, as opposed to photons) were ruled out by the shape and size of the flashes which are small and elliptical for gamma rays. The flux for photons over 300 GeV at this point in time in 1995 was 8.1±1.5 × 10^{−12} cm^{−2}s^{−1}

== Black hole ==
Blazars are likely to originate from matter falling into a black hole and possibly a binary black hole. The velocity dispersion (which is the maximum difference in the velocity toward or away from Earth) observed in the galaxy is 372 km/s which predicts a black hole mass of (0.9 − 3.4) × 10^{9} M_{☉}. However, dispersion of velocity was also measured as 291 and 270 km/s so the central mass may be less. A 23-day variability suggested that an object may be orbiting the central black hole with a 23-day period.

== Jet ==
With very-long-baseline interferometry, the fine detail of radio waves can be seen down to milliarcsecond (mas) resolution. A central very bright single point called the core is observed. From the core an extremely high-speed blast of plasma emerges in a narrow cone shape as a one-sided jet.

After 30 milliarcseconds, the jet, which is 300 pc long, does a 90° turn and fans out. The inner jet before the kink shows bright edges or a limb-brightened structure less than 10 mas wide. This is probably due to a fast-moving central part to the jet, combined with slower edges.

Normally, there would be jets of gas shooting out in opposite directions. The observed jet is the one that faces the earth and projects plasma towards Earth. There is also a jet heading away from Earth called a counter jet. Close into the core, this counter jet is so much dimmer than the main jet that it is invisible in radio waves.

The brightness of the counter jet is less than the main jet by a factor of 1250. This implies that the jet is relativistic with Γ about 15 (that is, the plasma is moving at 99.8% of the speed of light) and at an angle between 15° and 25° from the line of sight from the Earth. At 408 MHz, the power level is 1.81 Jy, although this is variable.

Beyond 10 kpc from the core, the counter jet becomes visible, showing that the jets have become non-relativistic; that is, plasma is no longer moving close to the speed of light. The symmetrical radio emission extends to 70", which corresponds to 120 to 200 kpc.

== Blazar research ==
In March 2022, scientists led by Ioannis Liodakis studied Markarian 501 during an average state while discerning how blazars make such a bright light using Imaging X-ray Polarimetry Explorer (IXPE). The researchers were "able to show that the particles in these jets are supercharged by shock fronts, resolving a longstanding 'unanswered question' about the dynamics of these brilliant objects."

We’ve known about these sources from the 60s. They are among the brightest objects in X-rays and for years we did not know how the X-rays are made. We had a few theories, but the radio and optical data we could get are not able to tell us much.

— Ioannis Liodakis, Postdoctoral Researcher, Finnish Centre for Astronomy with ESO

== Catalog entries ==
Early designations were 4C 39.49 and B2 1652+39. The Uppsala General Catalogue of Galaxies lists this as UGC 10599.

Other designations: B1652+39 or 1H1652+398 or TeV J1653+397.
