= Fred Lawrence Whipple Observatory =

American astronomical observatory in Arizona

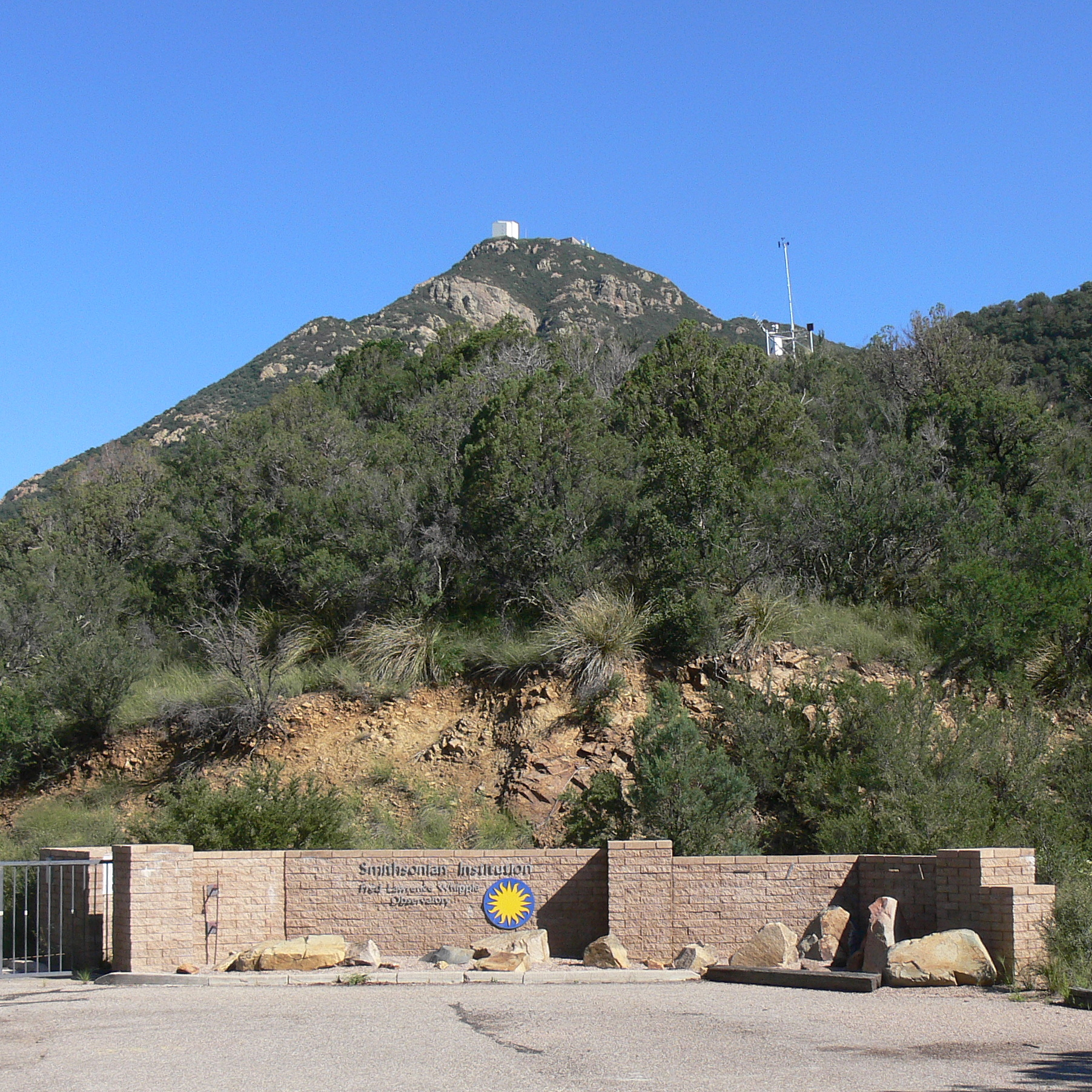
- Entrance to the Fred Lawrence Whipple Observatory
- Alternative names: The Mount Hopkins Observatory
- Named after: Fred Lawrence Whipple
- Observatory code: G91, 696
- Location: Mount Hopkins, Amado, Mount Hopkins, United States
- Coordinates: 31°40′52″N 110°52′41″W
- Altitude: 2,606 m (8,550 ft)
- Established: 1968
- Website: linmax.sao.arizona.edu/help/FLWO/whipple.html

Telescopes
- MMT Observatory: 6.5 m reflector
- Telescope: 1.5 m reflector
- Telescope: 1.2 m reflector
- PAIRITEL (V07; Chile): 1.3 m reflector
- MINERVA: 0.7m 5 telescopes
- VERITAS: 12 m 4-telescope array
- HATNet telescopes: optical refractor
- Location of Fred Lawrence Whipple Observatory
- Related media on Commons

The Fred Lawrence Whipple Observatory is an American astronomical observatory owned and operated by the Smithsonian Astrophysical Observatory (SAO); it is their largest field installation outside of their main site in Cambridge, Massachusetts. It is located near Amado, Arizona on the summit of Mount Hopkins.

Research activities include imaging and spectroscopy of extragalactic, stellar, solar system and extra-solar bodies, as well as gamma-ray and cosmic-ray astronomy.

== History ==
In 1966, roadwork began at the site with funding granted for the Smithsonian Mt. Hopkins Observatory. The Whipple 10-meter gamma-ray telescope was constructed in 1968.

Formerly known as the Mount Hopkins Observatory, the observatory was renamed in late 1981 in honor of Fred Lawrence Whipple, a planetary expert, space science pioneer, and director emeritus of SAO, under whose leadership the Arizona facility was established.

== Equipment ==
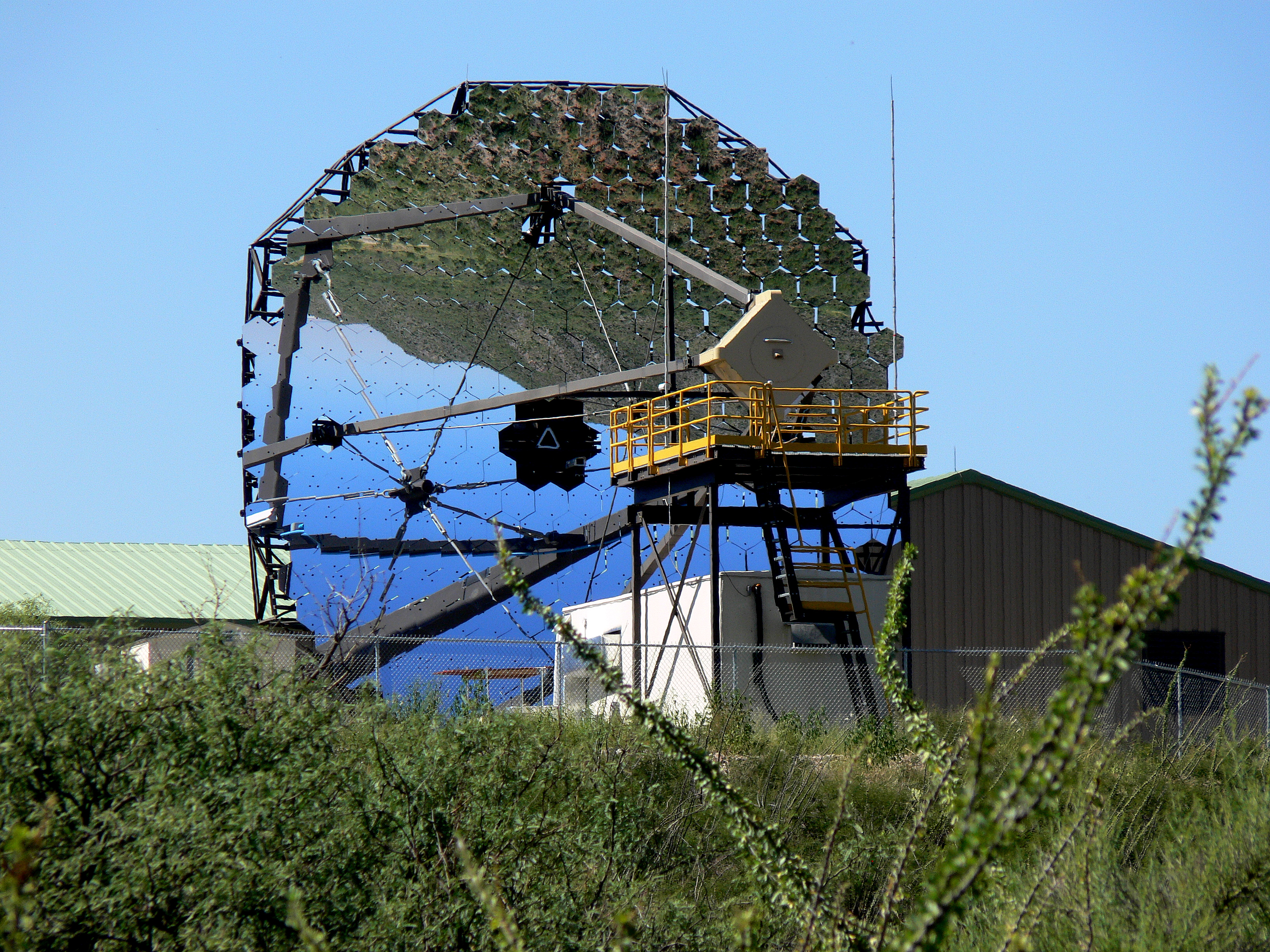
Mirrors on one of the VERITAS detectors

Whipple observatory hosts the MMT Observatory, which is jointly run by SAO and the University of Arizona and houses a 6.5-meter telescope. The observatory also has 1.5- and 1.2-meter reflectors and a second 1.3-meter reflector named PAIRITEL (Peters Automated IR Imaging Telescope, ex-2MASS ). Also on site is the HATNet (Hungarian-made Automated Telescope) network, the MEarth Project, and four 0.7-meter telescopes of the automated Miniature Exoplanet Radial Velocity Array (MINERVA).

The observatory is known for its pioneering work in ground-based gamma-ray astronomy through the development of the Imaging Atmospheric Cherenkov Technique (IACT) with the Whipple 10-meter Telescope during the early 1980s. The Whipple 10-meter is currently preparing to be decommissioned after forty years of service.

In April 2007, VERITAS (a system of 4 IACT telescopes with 12-meter reflectors) started full operations at the FLWO basecamp. Subsequently, in September 2009, after a 4-month effort, one of the telescopes was moved to a new position, making the array symmetric and increasing its sensitivity.

== See also ==
- List of astronomical observatories
- Whipple (spacecraft)
