= High Energy Stereoscopic System =

Gamma Ray Telescope System in Namibia

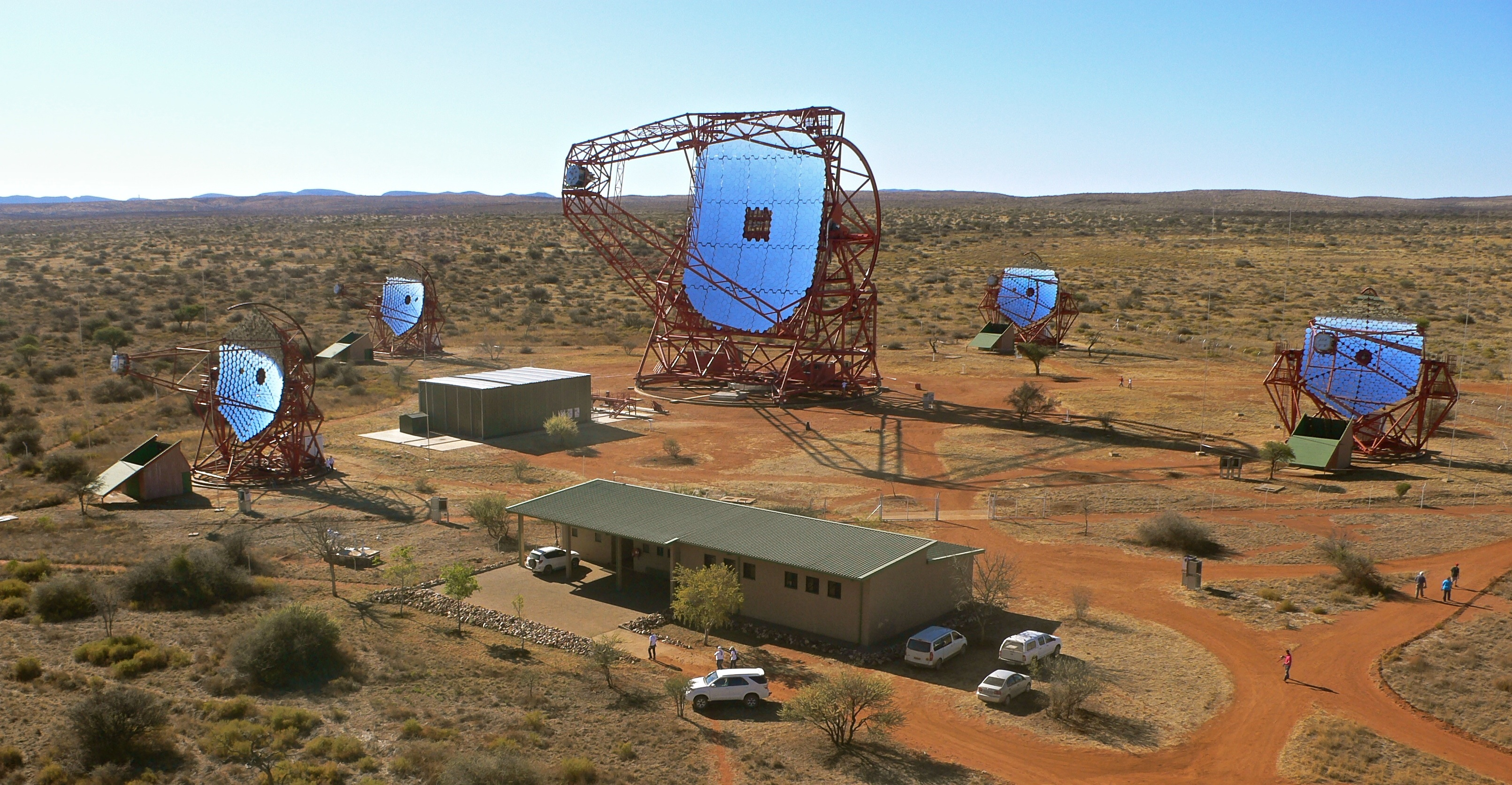
- The five-telescope H.E.S.S. array

- Alternative names: H.E.S.S.
- Location: Khomas Region, Namibia
- Coordinates: 23°16′17″S 16°30′00″E
- Altitude: 1,800 m (5,900 ft)
- Telescope style: atmospheric Cherenkov
- Website: hess-experiment.eu
- Location within Namibia
- Related media on Commons

High Energy Stereoscopic System (H.E.S.S.) is a system of imaging atmospheric Cherenkov telescopes (IACTs) for the investigation of cosmic gamma rays in the photon energy range of 0.03 to 100 TeV, located in the Khomas Region of Namibia and operating since 2002. The acronym was chosen in honour of Victor Hess, who discovered the extraterrestrial origin of cosmic rays.

The name also emphasizes two main features of the installation, namely the simultaneous observation of air showers with several telescopes, under different viewing angles, and the combination of telescopes to a large system to increase the effective detection area for gamma rays. H.E.S.S. permits the exploration of gamma-ray sources with intensities at a level of a few thousandth parts of the flux of the Crab Nebula.

As with other gamma-ray telescopes, H.E.S.S. observes high energy processes in the universe. Gamma-ray producing sources include supernova remnants, active galactic nuclei and pulsar wind nebulae. It also actively tests unproven theories in physics such as looking for the predicted gamma-ray annihilation signal from WIMP dark matter particles and testing Lorentz invariance predictions of loop quantum gravity.

H.E.S.S. is located in the Khomas highlands of Namibia near the Gamsberg mountain, an area well known for its excellent optical quality.

== Installation ==
H.E.S.S. consists of five telescopes: four with mirrors just under 12 m in diameter, arranged as a square with 120 m sides, and one larger telescope with a 28 m mirror, located at the centre of the array.

The four smaller telescopes were constructed as the first phase of the H.E.S.S. project, with the first of the four telescopes beginning operation in Summer 2002; all four were operational in December 2003, with the project officially inaugurated in 2004.

The central 28 m telescope was added as an upgrade (called H.E.S.S. II) in 2012, which increased sensitivity and extended the installation's ability to detect lower energy radiation.

== Discoveries and observations ==
In 2004 H.E.S.S. was the first IACT experiment to spatially resolve a source of cosmic gamma rays.

In 2005, it was announced that H.E.S.S. had detected eight new high-energy gamma ray sources, doubling the known number of such sources. As of 2014, more than 90 sources of teraelectronvolt gamma rays were discovered by H.E.S.S.

In 2016, the HESS collaboration reported deep gamma ray observations which show the presence of petaelectronvolt-protons originating from Sagittarius A*, the supermassive black hole at the centre of the Milky Way, and therefore should be considered as a viable alternative to supernova remnants as a source of petaelectronvolt galactic cosmic rays.

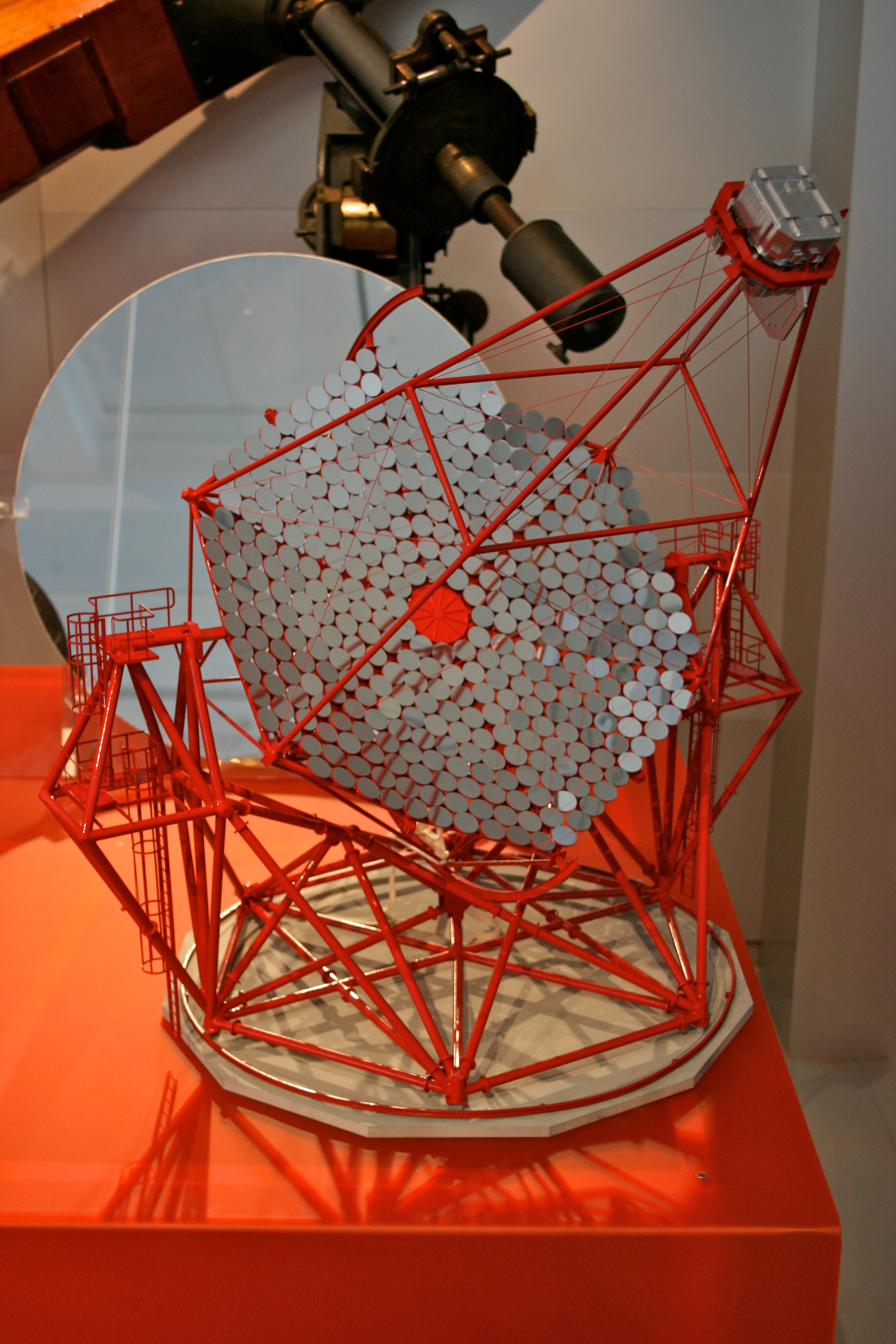
A 1/30 scale model of a H.E.S.S. telescope on display in the Science Museum, London.

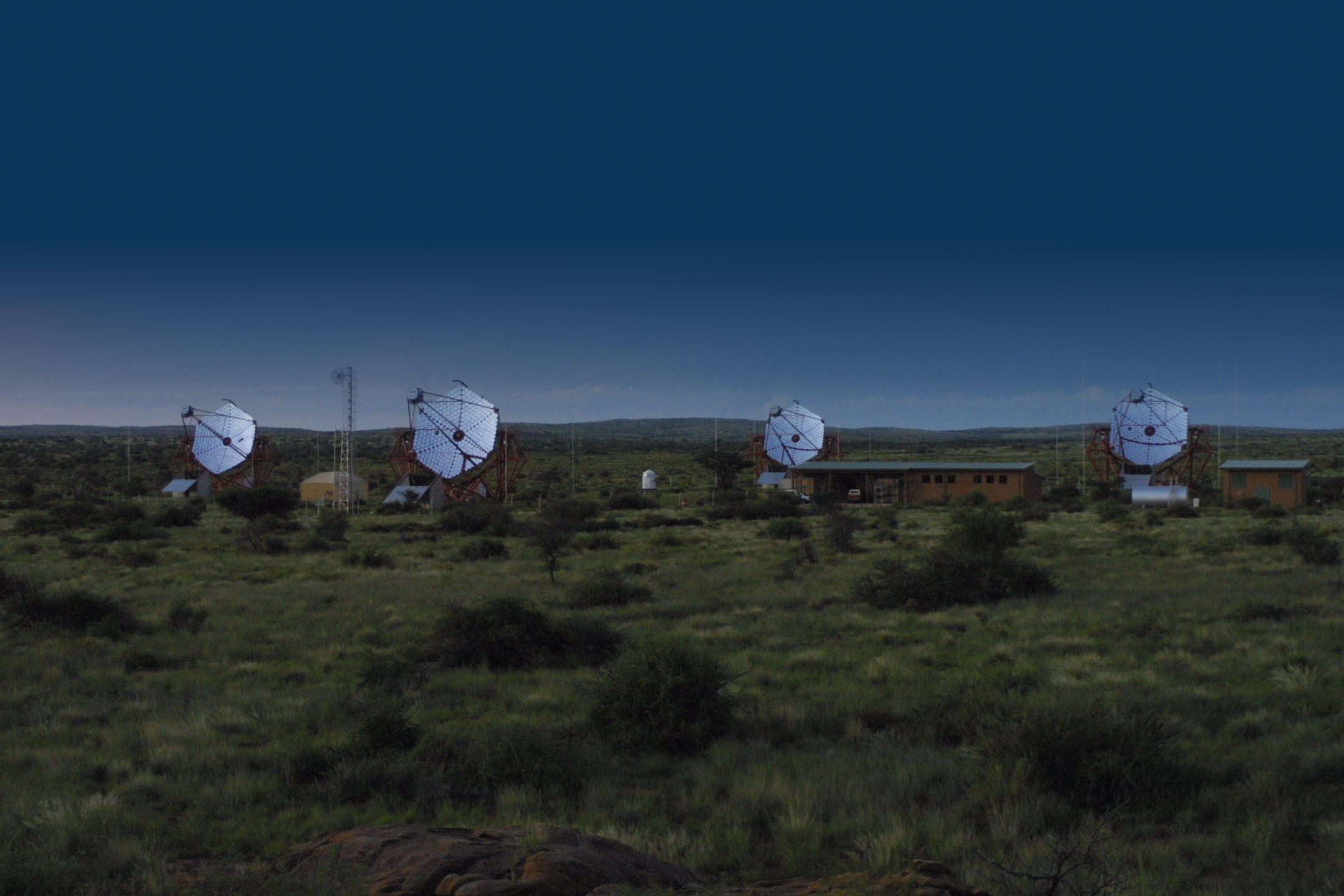
Four telescopes in operation at night

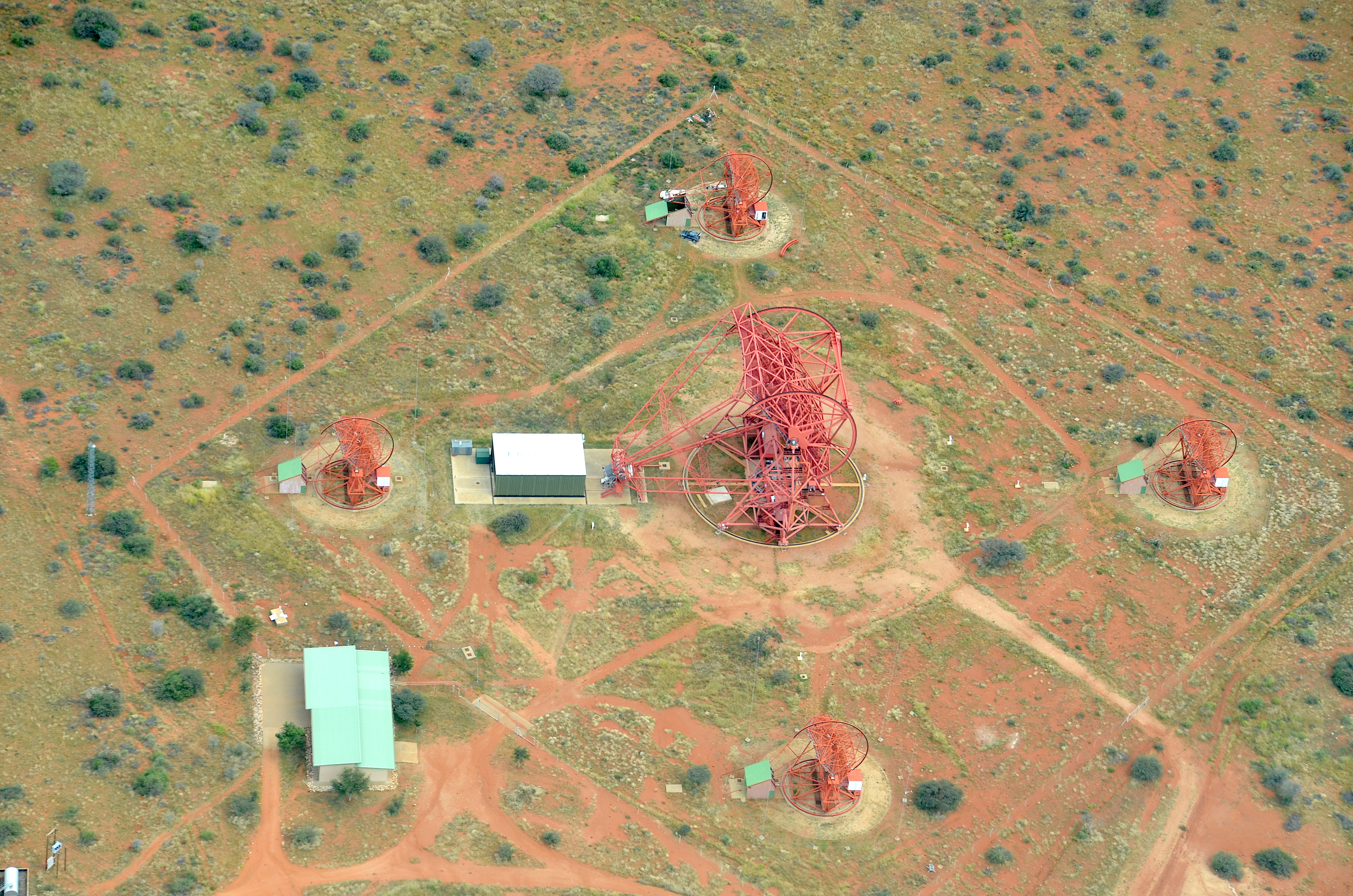
Aerial view of H.E.S.S. (2017)

== See also ==
- Werner Hofmann (physicist)
- Major Atmospheric Cerenkov Experiment Telescope
