= Photon energy =

Energy carried by a photon

Photon energy is the energy carried by a single photon. The amount of energy is directly proportional to the photon's electromagnetic frequency and thus, equivalently, is inversely proportional to the wavelength. The higher the photon's frequency, the higher its energy. Equivalently, the longer the photon's wavelength, the lower its energy.

Photon energy can be expressed using any energy unit. Among the units commonly used to denote photon energy are the electronvolt (eV) and the joule (as well as its multiples, such as the microjoule). As one joule equals 6.24×10^{18} eV, the larger units may be more useful in denoting the energy of photons with higher frequency and higher energy, such as gamma rays, as opposed to lower energy photons as in the optical and radio frequency regions of the electromagnetic spectrum.

== Formulas ==
=== Physics ===
Photon energy is directly proportional to frequency via the Planck relation.
$$\begin{align}
E &= hf = \frac{hc}{\lambda}\\
f &=\frac c \lambda\\
\end{align}$$

- E is the photon's energy in J
- f is the photon's frequency in Hz
- λ is the photon's wavelength in m
- h is the Planck constant, 6.62607015×10^{−34} J⋅Hz^{−1}
- c is the speed of light in vacuum, 299792458 m⋅s^{−1}

The photon energy at 1 Hz is equal to 6.62607015×10^{−34} J (4.13566770×10^{−15} eV).

=== Electronvolt ===
Photon energy is often measured in electronvolts. One electronvolt (eV) is exactly 1.602176634×10^{−19} J or, using the zepto prefix, 160.2176634 zJ, in the SI system. To find the photon energy in electronvolts using the wavelength in micrometres, the equation is approximately
$$E\text{ (eV)} = \frac{1.2398}{\lambda\text{ (μm)}}$$
since hc/e = 1.239841984332×10^{−6} eV⋅m where h is the Planck constant, c is the speed of light, and e is the elementary charge.

The photon energy of near infrared radiation at 1 μm wavelength is approximately 1.2398 eV.

== Examples ==
An FM radio station transmitting at 100 MHz emits photons with an energy of about 4.1357×10^{−7} eV. This minuscule amount of energy is approximately 8×10^{−13} times an electron's mass (via mass–energy equivalence).

Very-high-energy gamma rays have photon energies of 100 GeV to over 1 PeV (10^{11} to 10^{15} electronvolts) or 16 nJ to 160 μJ. This corresponds to frequencies of 2.42×10^{25} Hz to 2.42×10^{29} Hz.

During photosynthesis, specific chlorophyll molecules absorb red-light photons at a wavelength of 700 nm in the photosystem I, corresponding to an energy of each photon of ≈ 2 eV ≈ 3×10^{−19} J ≈ 75 k_{B}T, where k_{B}T denotes the thermal energy. A minimum of 48 photons is needed for the synthesis of a single glucose molecule from CO_{2} and water (chemical potential difference 5×10^{−18} J) with a maximal energy conversion efficiency of 35%.

== See also ==
- Electromagnetic radiation
- Electromagnetic spectrum
- Planck relation
- Soft photon
