= Blazar =

Very compact quasi-stellar radio source

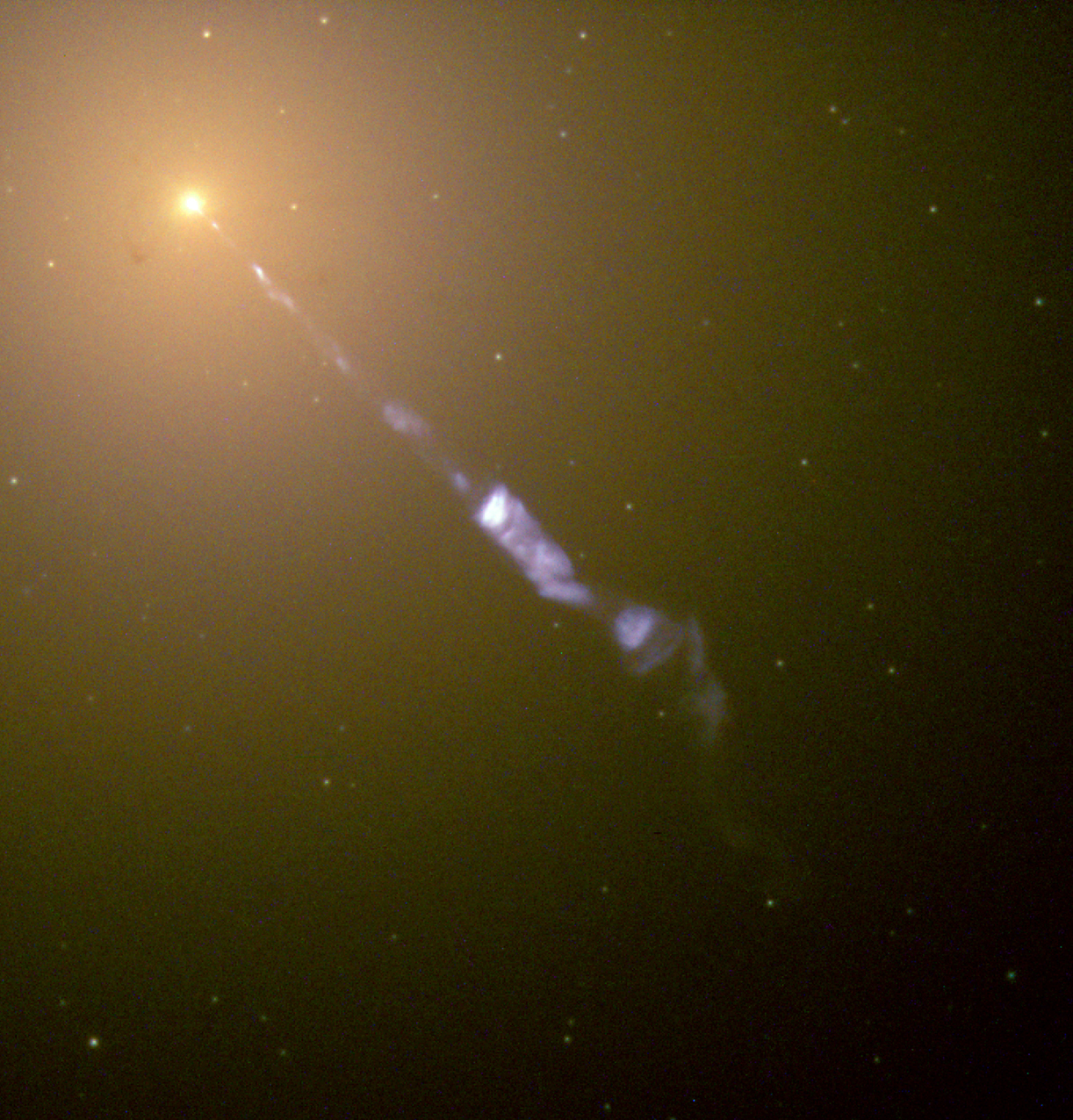
The elliptical galaxy M87 emitting a relativistic jet, as seen by the Hubble Space Telescope. An active galaxy is classified as a blazar when its jet is pointing close to the line of sight. In the case of M87, because the angle between the jet and the line of sight is not small, its nucleus is not classified as a blazar, but rather as radio galaxy.

A blazar (neologism of "BL Lacertae" and "Quasar") is an active galactic nucleus (AGN) with a relativistic jet – a jet composed of ionized matter traveling at nearly the speed of light – directed very nearly towards an observer. Relativistic beaming of electromagnetic radiation from the jet makes blazars appear much brighter than they would be if the jet were pointed in a direction away from Earth. Blazars are powerful sources of emission across the electromagnetic spectrum and are observed to be sources of high-energy gamma ray photons. Blazars are highly variable sources, often undergoing rapid and dramatic fluctuations in brightness on short timescales (hours to days). Some blazar jets appear to exhibit superluminal motion, another consequence of material in the jet traveling toward the observer at nearly the speed of light.

The blazar category is sub-divided into BL Lac objects and flat-spectrum radio quasars (FSRQ), with the former having weak or no emission lines and the latter showing strong emission lines. The generally accepted theory is that BL Lac objects are intrinsically low-power radio galaxies while FSRQ quasars are intrinsically powerful radio-loud quasars. The name "blazar" was coined in 1978 by astronomer Edward Spiegel to denote the combination of these two classes. In visible-wavelength images, most blazars appear compact and pointlike, but high-resolution images reveal that they are located at the centers of elliptical galaxies.

Blazars are important topics of research in astronomy and high-energy astrophysics. Blazar research includes investigation of the properties of accretion disks and jets, the central supermassive black holes and surrounding host galaxies, and the emission of high-energy photons, cosmic rays, and neutrinos.

== Structure ==
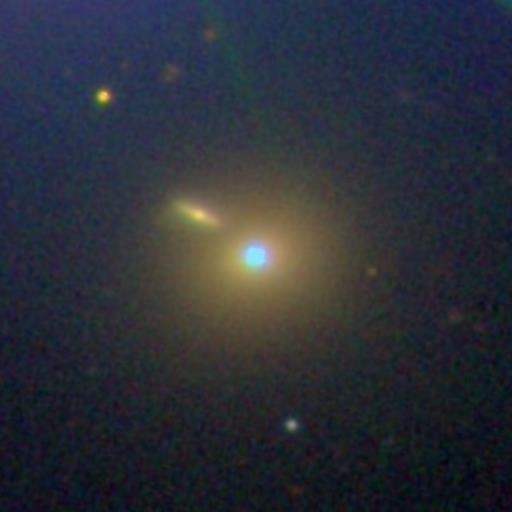
Sloan Digital Sky Survey image of blazar Markarian 421 (center), illustrating the bright nucleus and elliptical host galaxy, with a spiral galaxy companion to the upper left of center

Blazars, like all active galactic nuclei (AGN), are thought to be powered by material falling into a supermassive black hole in the core of the host galaxy. Gas, dust and the occasional star are captured and spiral into this central black hole, creating a hot accretion disk which generates enormous amounts of energy in the form of photons, electrons, positrons and other elementary particles. This region is relatively small, approximately 10^{−3} parsecs in size.

There is a larger opaque toroid extending several parsecs from the black hole, containing a hot gas with embedded regions of higher density. These "clouds" can absorb and re-emit energy from regions closer to the black hole. On Earth, the clouds are detected as emission lines in the blazar spectrum.

Perpendicular to the accretion disk, a pair of relativistic jets carries highly energetic plasma away from the AGN. The jet is collimated by a combination of intense magnetic fields and powerful winds from the accretion disk and toroid. Inside the jet, high energy photons and particles interact with each other and the strong magnetic field. These relativistic jets can extend as far as many tens of kiloparsecs from the central black hole.

All of these regions can produce a variety of observed energy, mostly in the form of a nonthermal spectrum ranging from very low-frequency radio to extremely energetic gamma rays, with a high polarization (typically a few percent) at some frequencies. The nonthermal spectrum consists of synchrotron radiation in the radio to X-ray range, and inverse Compton emission in the X-ray to gamma-ray region. A thermal spectrum peaking in the ultraviolet region and faint optical emission lines are also present in FSRQ, but faint or non-existent in BL Lac objects.

== Relativistic beaming ==
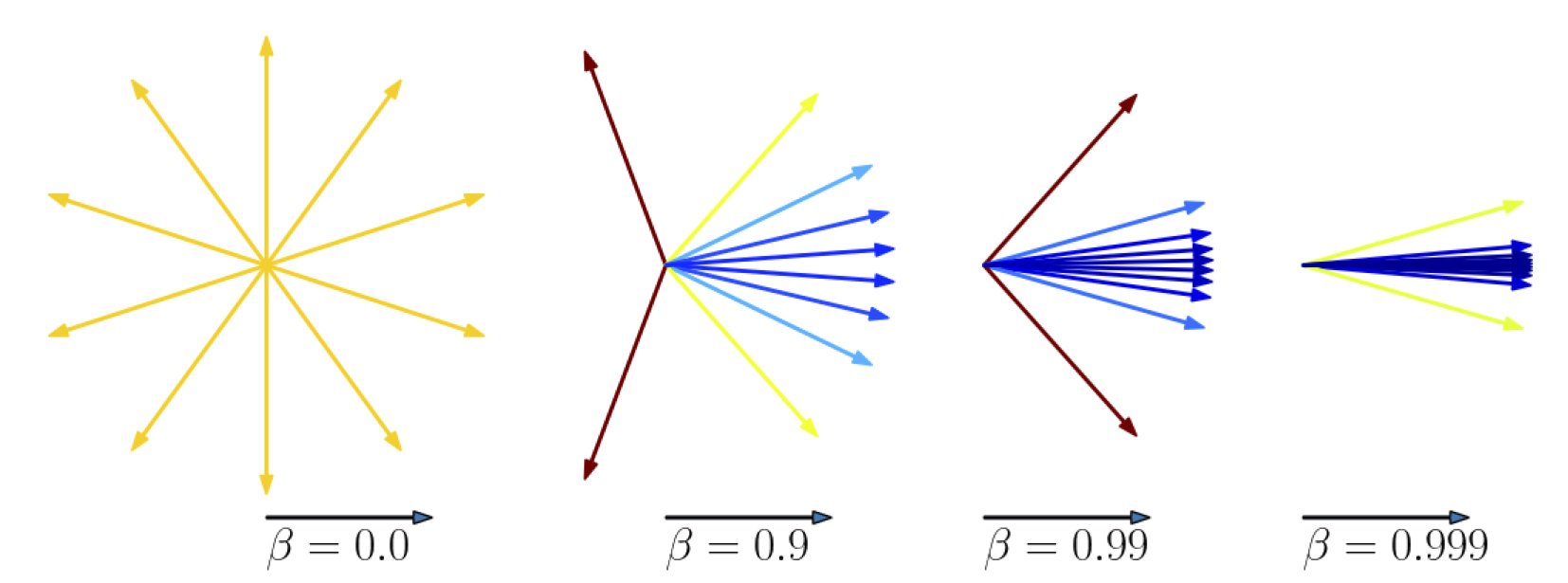
Light from a relativistic source becomes more directed and blue-shifted in the direction of motion with increasing velocity v. β = v/c

The observed emission from a blazar is greatly enhanced by relativistic effects in the jet, a process called relativistic beaming. The bulk speed of the plasma that constitutes the jet can be 99.5% of the speed of light, although individual particles move at higher speeds in various directions.

Relativistic jets emit most of their energy via synchrotron emission. The luminosity emitted in the rest frame of the jet depends on the physical characteristics of the jet. These include whether the luminosity arises from a shock front or a series of brighter blobs in the jet, as well as details of the magnetic fields within the jet and their interaction with the moving particles.

A simple model of beaming illustrates the basic relativistic effects connecting the luminosity in the rest frame of the jet, S_{e}, and the luminosity observed on Earth, S_{o}: S_{o} is proportional to S_{e} × D^{2}, where D is the doppler factor.

When considered in much more detail, three relativistic effects are involved:

- Relativistic aberration contributes a factor of D^{2}. Aberration is a consequence of special relativity where directions which appear isotropic in the rest frame (in this case, the jet) appear pushed towards the direction of motion in the observer's frame (in this case, Earth).
- Time dilation contributes a factor of D^{+1}. This effect speeds up the apparent release of energy. If the jet emits a burst of energy every minute in its own rest frame, this release would be observed on Earth as much more frequent, perhaps every ten seconds.
- Windowing can contribute a factor of D^{−1} and then works to decrease boosting. This happens for a steady flow because there are then D fewer elements of fluid within the observed window, as each element has been expanded by factor D. However, for a freely propagating blob of material, the radiation is boosted by the full D^{+3}.

For example, consider a jet with an angle to the line of sight θ = 5° and a speed of 99.9% of the speed of light. The luminosity observed from Earth is 70 times greater than the emitted luminosity. However, if θ is at the minimum value of 0° the jet will appear 600 times brighter from Earth.

=== Receding beam ===
Relativistic beaming has another critical consequence. A counter-jet that is receding from Earth will appear dimmer because of the same relativistic effects. Therefore, intrinsically identical bipolar jets will appear significantly asymmetric. In the example given above any jet where θ > 35° will be observed on Earth as less luminous than it would be from the rest frame of the jet.

A further consequence is that, due to "Doppler favouritism", a population of intrinsically identical AGN scattered in space with random jet orientations will look like a very inhomogeneous population on Earth. The few objects where θ is small will have one very bright jet, while the rest will apparently have considerably weaker jets. Those where θ varies from 90° will appear to have asymmetric jets.

This is the essence behind the connection between blazars and radio galaxies. AGN which have jets oriented close to the line of sight with Earth can appear extremely different from other AGN even if they are intrinsically identical.

== Discovery ==
Many of the brighter blazars were first identified, not as powerful distant galaxies, but as irregular variable stars in our own galaxy. These blazars, like genuine irregular variable stars, changed in brightness on periods of days or years, but with no pattern.

The early development of radio astronomy had shown that there are many bright radio sources in the sky. By the end of the 1950s, the resolution of radio telescopes was sufficient to identify specific radio sources with optical counterparts, leading to the discovery of quasars. Blazars were highly represented among these early quasars, and the first redshift was found for 3C 273, a highly variable quasar which is also a blazar.

In 1968, a similar connection was made between the "variable star" BL Lacertae and a powerful radio source VRO 42.22.01. BL Lacertae shows many of the characteristics of quasars, but the optical spectrum was devoid of the spectral lines used to determine redshift. Faint indications of an underlying galaxy—proof that BL Lacertae was not a star—were found in 1974.

The extragalactic nature of BL Lacertae was not a surprise. In 1972 a few variable optical and radio sources were grouped together and proposed as a new class of galaxy: BL Lacertae-type objects. This terminology was soon shortened to "BL Lacertae object", "BL Lac object" or simply "BL Lac". (The latter term can also mean the original individual blazar and not the entire class.)

As of 2015, over three thousand sources have been confirmed as BL Lac objects, or exhibit similar characteristics. One of the closest blazars, 3C 273, is 2.5 billion light years away. The nearest BL Lac object is Centaurus A.

== Current view ==
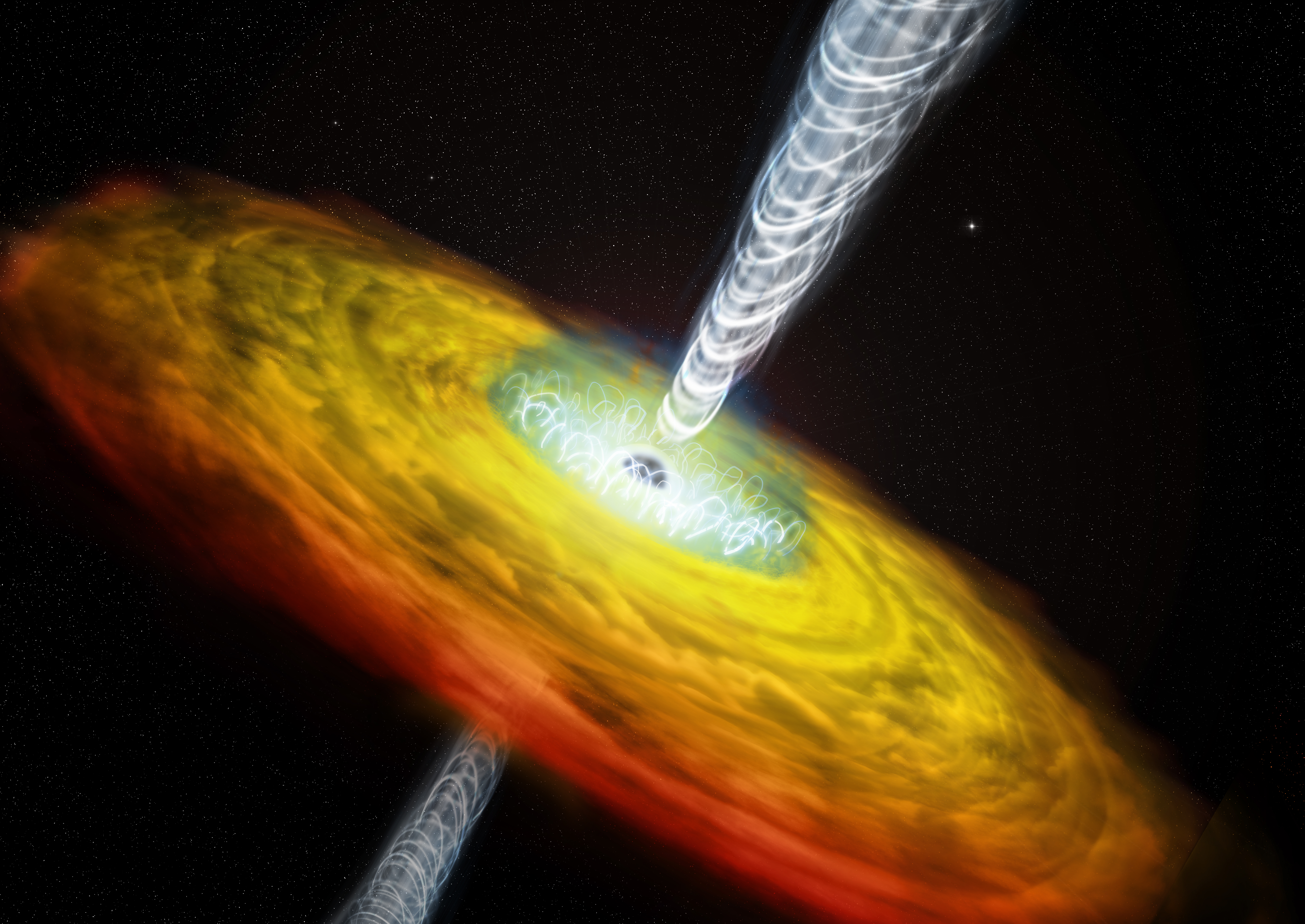
Illustration of a prototypical quasar showing the supermassive black hole at center with its accretion disk and magnetically confined, bipolar jets

Blazars are thought to be active galactic nuclei, with relativistic jets oriented close to the line of sight with the observer. They are sub-divided into BL Lac objects and flat-spectrum radio quasars (FSRQ), with the former having weak or no emission lines and the latter showing strong emission lines. The FSRQ are alternatively defined as optically violently variable (OVV) quasars, highly polarized quasars (HPQ), or core-dominated quasars (CDQ). The term FSRQ comes from the distinction between steep spectrum and flat spectrum radio-loud quasars, based on the overall shape of their radio continuum (after disregarding emission features).

The special jet orientation explains the general peculiar characteristics: high observed luminosity, very rapid variation, high polarization (compared to non-blazar quasars), and the apparent superluminal motions detected along the first few parsecs of the jets in most blazars.

A Unified Scheme or Unified Model has become generally accepted, where highly variable quasars are related to intrinsically powerful radio galaxies, and BL Lac objects are related to intrinsically weak radio galaxies. The distinction between these two connected populations explains the difference in emission line properties in blazars.

Other explanations for the relativistic jet/unified scheme approach which have been proposed include gravitational microlensing and coherent emission from the relativistic jet. Neither of these explains the overall properties of blazars. For example, microlensing is achromatic. That is, all parts of a spectrum would rise and fall together. This is not observed in blazars. However, it is possible that these processes, as well as more complex plasma physics, can account for specific observations or some details.

Examples of blazars include 3C 454.3, 3C 273, BL Lacertae, PKS 2155-304, Markarian 421, Markarian 501, 4C +71.07, PKS 0537-286 (QSO 0537-286), and S5 0014+81. Markarian 501 and 1ES 1959+650 are called "TeV Blazars" for their high energy (teraelectron-volt range) gamma-ray emission.

In July 2018, the IceCube Neutrino Observatory team traced a neutrino that hit its Antarctica-based detector in September 2017 to its point of origin in the blazar TXS 0506+056, located 3.7 billion light-years away. This was the first time that a neutrino detector was used to locate an object in space.

== See also ==
- Galaxy formation and evolution
- Seyfert galaxy
