= List of most massive black holes =

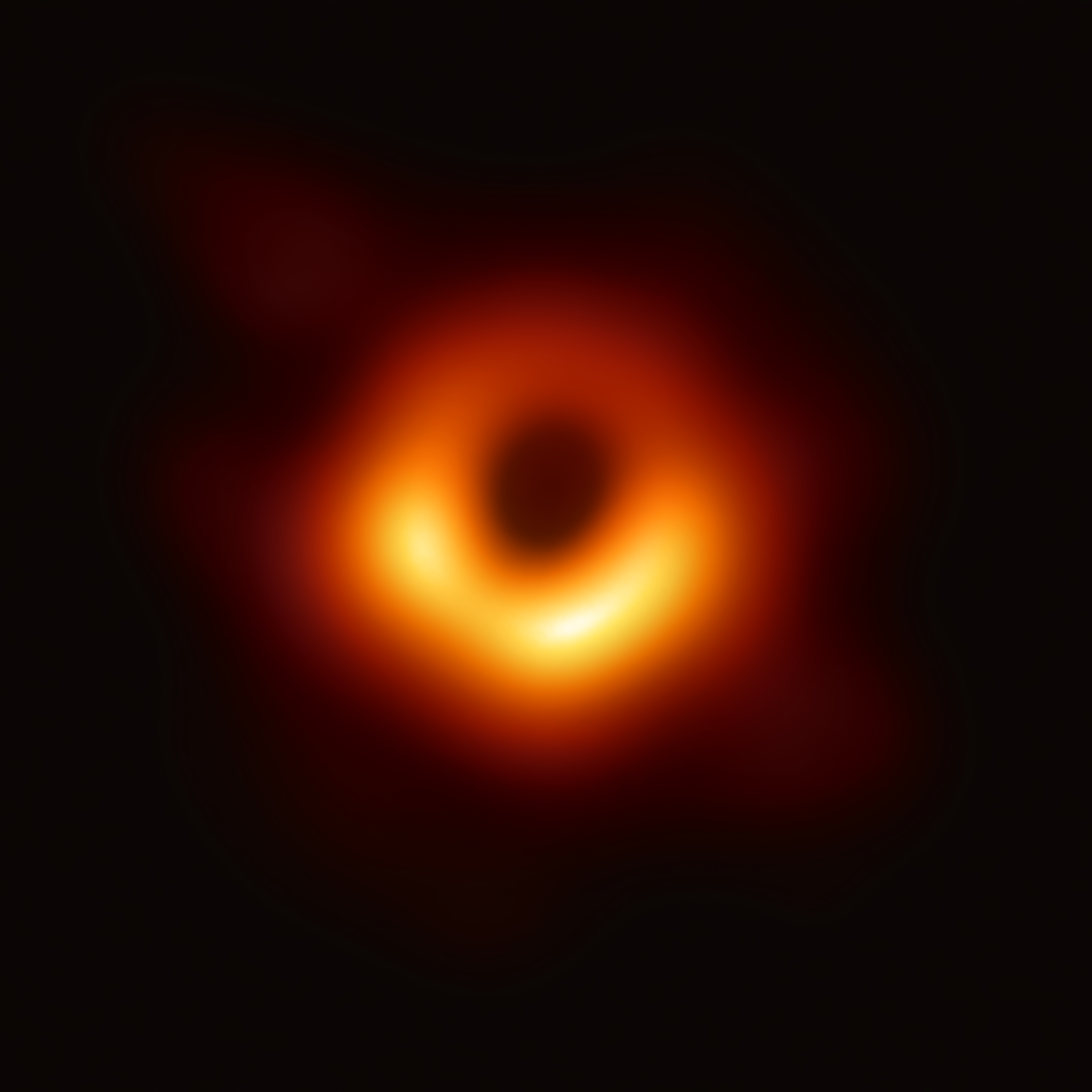
Pōwehi, the supermassive black hole at the core of Messier 87, here shown by an image by the Event Horizon Telescope, is among the black holes in this list.

This is an ordered list of the most massive black holes so far discovered (and probable candidates), measured in units of solar masses (M_{☉}), about 2×10^{30} kilograms.

== Introduction ==
Size comparison between Sagittarius A* and Pōwehi (labeled as M87*). The diameter of Sagittarius A* is smaller than the orbit of Mercury.

A supermassive black hole (SMBH) is an extremely large black hole, on the order of at least hundreds of thousands of solar masses (M_{☉}), and is theorized to exist in the center of almost all massive galaxies. In some galaxies, there are even binary systems of SMBHs such as the OJ 287 system. Unambiguous dynamical evidence for SMBHs exists only in a handful of galaxies; these include the Milky Way, the Local Group galaxies Andromeda Galaxy and Messier 32, and a few galaxies beyond the Local Group, e.g. NGC 4395. In these galaxies, the mean square (or root mean square) speed of the stars or gas rises as ~1/r near the center, indicating a central point mass. In all other galaxies observed to date, the rms speed is flat, or even falling, toward the center, making it impossible to state with certainty that an SMBH is there. Nevertheless, it is commonly accepted that the center of nearly every galaxy contains a supermassive black hole. The reason for this assumption is the M–sigma relation, a tight (low scatter) relation between the mass of the hole in the ~10 galaxies with secure detections, and the velocity dispersion of the stars in the bulges of those galaxies. This correlation, although based on just a handful of galaxies, suggests to many astronomers a strong connection between the formation of the black hole and the galaxy itself.

Though SMBHs are currently theorized to exist in almost all massive galaxies, more massive black holes are rare; only fewer than several dozen are known to date. It is extremely difficult to determine the mass of a particular SMBH, so they remain in the field of open research. SMBHs with accurate masses are limited only to galaxies within the Laniakea Supercluster and to active galactic nuclei.

Another problem for this list is the method of determining the mass. Such methods, such as broad emission-line reverberation mapping (BLRM), Doppler measurements, velocity dispersion, and the aforementioned M–sigma relation are not yet well established. Most of the time, the masses derived from the given methods, contradict each other's values.

NASA animation shows a size comparison of the SMBHs.

This list contains SMBHs with known masses, determined at least to an order of magnitude. Some objects in this list have two citations, like 3C 273; one from Bradley M. Peterson et al. using the BLRM method, and the other from Charles Nelson using [O_{III}]λ5007 value and velocity dispersion. Note that this list is very far from complete, as the Sloan Digital Sky Survey (SDSS) alone detected 200,000 quasars, which likely may be the homes of 10^{9}-solar-mass black holes. There are also several hundred citations for black hole measurements not yet on this list. Nonetheless, most well-known black holes above 10^{9} M_{☉} are shown. Messier galaxies with precisely known black holes are all included.

Discoveries suggest that many black holes, dubbed 'stupendously large', may exceed 10^{11} or even 10^{12} M_{☉}.

== List ==
Masses are here given in scientific notation. Values with uncertainties are written in parentheses when possible. Different entries in this list have different methods and systematics in obtaining their masses, hence different levels of confidence in their masses. These methods are specified in their notes.

List of most massive black holes
Host or black hole name	Mass (M_{☉})	Notes
(Maximal Theoretical Limit)	2.7×10^{11}	The limit is only 5×10^{10} M_{☉} for black holes with typical properties, but can reach 2.7×10^{11} M_{☉} at maximal prograde spin (a = 1).
Phoenix A	1×10^{11}, ~1.26×10^{10}	Estimated using a calorimetric model on the adiabatic behavior of core regrowth and an assumed core-Sérsic model of n=4. It is consistent with evolutionary modelling of gas accretion and the dynamics and density profiles of the galaxy. Mass has not been measured directly. Another recent estimate gives ~1.26×10^{10} M_{☉}, though this is still uncertain due to the low resolution of X-ray/MIR data.
IC 1101	9.33+16.37 −5.94×10^{10}	Estimated from the break radius of the central core; previous estimations using properties of the host galaxy (Faber–Jackson relation) yield about (4–10)×10^{10} M_{☉}
Abell 1689 BCG	8.53+14.96 −5.43×10^{10}	Estimated using break radius of 3.8 kpc. (Note: $\log \left(\frac{M_{\rm BH}}{M_{\odot}}\right) = (1{,}16 \pm 0{,}10) \log \left(\frac{R_{\rm b}}{250\text{ pc}}\right) + (9{,}56 \pm 0{,}05)$)
Abell 2261 BCG	6.46+11.74 −4.17×10^{10}	Estimated from the break radius of the central core. However, no evidence of the black hole has been found at the galactic center. Either it is accreting at a low rate or is not in the center of its galaxy.
(Typical Theoretical Limit)	5×10^{10}	This is the maximum mass of a black hole with typical properties that models predict, at least for luminous accreting SMBHs. At ~10^{10} M_{☉}, effects of both intense radiation and star formation in the accretion disc slow down black hole growth. Given the age of the universe and the composition of available matter, there is simply not enough time to grow black holes larger than this mass. The limit is only 5×10^{10} M_{☉} for black holes with typical properties, but can reach 2.7×10^{11} M_{☉} at maximal prograde spin (a = 1).
Abell 402 BCG	4.52+7.94 −2.88×10^{10}	A black hole of this size likely caused a kiloparsec-scale cavity in the centrum of the cluster A402. Additionally, a second AGN candidate exists on the opposite side of the cavity, suggesting a dual AGN with a total binary mass of (6±2)×10^{10} M_{☉}, possibly the most massive one known. Estimated using break radius.
4C +74.13	4.47+8.9 −2.92×10^{10}	Produced a colossal AGN outburst after accreting 600 million M_{☉} worth of material. Estimated using the break radius of 0.5 kpc core of the central galaxy. Previous indirect assumptions about the efficiencies of gas accretion and jet power yield a lower limit of 1 billion M_{☉}.
TON 618	4.07×10^{10}	Estimated from quasar C IV line correlation. An older estimate gives a mass of 6.6×10^{10}M_{☉} based on the quasar Hβ emission line correlation.
SDSS J143148.09+053558	3.64×10^{10}	
SDSS J114833.14+193003.2	3.631+0.550 −0.625×10^{10}	
SMSS J215728.21-360215.1	(3.4±0.6)×10^{10}	Estimated using near-infrared spectroscopic measurements of the MgII emission line doublet.
SDSS J102325.31+514251.0	3.31+0.67 −0.56×10^{10}	Estimated from quasar MgII emission line correlation.
Abell 1201 BCG	(3.27±0.71)×10^{10}	Estimated using strong gravitational lensing from a distant galaxy 1.3 arcseconds separated from the nucleus of the BCG. Earlier estimates suggest a mass of 1.3×10^{10} M_{☉}. Beware of ambiguity between the BH mass determination and the galaxy cluster's dark matter profile.
H1821+643	3×10^{10}	Value obtained as an indirect estimate using a model of minimum Eddington luminosity required to account for the Compton cooling of the surrounding cluster.
NGC 6166	2.84+0.27 −0.18×10^{10}	Central galaxy of Abell 2199; notable for its hundred thousand light year long relativistic jet.
4C +37.11	2.8+0.8 −0.8×10^{10}	Total mass of black hole binary system.
2MASS J13260399+7023462	2.7±0.4 × 10^{10}	Estimated using the full-width half maxima of the C_{IV} emission line and monochromatic luminosity at 1350 Å wavelength.
ESO 444-46	2.69×10^{10} (5.01×10^{8}–7.76×10^{10})	Brightest cluster galaxy of Abell 3558 in the center of the Shapley Supercluster; estimated using break radius of the host galaxy.
UGC 10143	2.63×10^{10}	Brightest cluster galaxy of Abell 2147, estimated using core-break radius.
ESO 383-76	2.51+4.41 −1.6×10^{10}	Estimated using break radius of the galaxy central core.
3C 454.3 primary	2.4×10^{10}	A likely binary supermassive black hole expected to merge in 57,000 years.
APM 08279+5255	2.3×10^{10}, 1.0+0.17 −0.13×10^{10}	Based on velocity width of CO line from orbiting molecular gas, and reverberation mapping using SiIV and CIV emission lines.
Holmberg 15A	2.16+0.23 −0.28×10^{10}	Mass based on the orbital motion of stars around the SMBH. Earlier estimates range from ~310 billion M_{☉} down to 3 billion M_{☉}, all relying on empirical scaling relations and are thus obtained from extrapolation and not from kinematical measurements.
NGC 4889	2.1±1.6 × 10^{10}	Best fit: the estimate ranges from 6 billion to 37 billion M_{☉}.
SDSS J074521.78+734336.1	1.95±0.05 × 10^{10}	Estimated from quasar MgII emission line correlation.
OJ 287 primary	1.835×10^{10}	A smaller 100 million M_{☉} black hole orbits this one in a 12-year period (see below).
NGC 1600	(1.7±0.15)×10^{10}	Unprecedentedly massive in relation of its location: an elliptical galaxy host in a sparse environment.
SDSS J08019.69+373047.3	(1.51±0.31)×10^{10}	Estimated from quasar MgII emission line correlation.
SDSS J115954.33+201921.1	(1.41±0.10)×10^{10}	Estimated from quasar MgII emission line correlation.
SDSS J075303.34+423130.8	(1.38±0.03)×10^{10}	Estimated from quasar Hβ emission line correlation.
SDSS J080430.56+542041.1	(1.35±0.22)×10^{10}	Estimated from quasar MgII emission line correlation.
SDSS J081855.77+095848.0	(1.20±0.06)×10^{10}	Estimated from quasar MgII emission line correlation.
NGC 1270	1.2×10^{10}	Elliptical galaxy located in the Perseus Cluster. Also is a low-luminosity AGN (LLAGN).
SDSS J082535.19+512706.3	(1.12±0.20)×10^{10}	Estimated from quasar Hβ emission line
S5 0014+81	(1.1–1.38)×10^{10}	A 2010 paper suggested that a funnel collimates the radiation around the jet axis, creating an optical illusion of very high brightness, and thus a possible overestimed mass of 40 billion M_{☉}.
SDSS J013127.34-032100.1	(1.1±0.2)×10^{10}	Estimated from accretion disk spectrum modelling.
ICRF J131043.3-555211	1.05+0.02 −0.05×10^{10}	Estimated from MgII emission line correlation.
PSO J334.2028+01.4075	1×10^{10}	There are actually two black holes, orbiting at each other in a close pair with a 542-day period. The largest one is quoted, while the smaller one's mass is not defined.
RX J1532.9+3021	1×10^{10}	
QSO B2126-158	1×10^{10}–4.9+1.13 −1.01×10^{10}	Higher value estimated with quasar Hβ emission line correlation.
NGC 1281	1×10^{10}	Compact elliptical galaxy in the Perseus Cluster. Mass estimates range from 10 billion M_{☉} down to <5 billion M_{☉}.
SDSS J015741.57-010629.6	(9.8±1.4)×10^{9}	
NGC 3842	9.55+3.04 −2.63×10^{9}	Brightest galaxy in the Leo Cluster. Previous estimates yield at least 9.7 billion M_{☉}.
SDSS J230301.45-093930.7	(9.12±0.88)×10^{9}	Estimated from quasar MgII emission line correlation.
SDSS J140821.67+025733.2	8×10^{9}	This black hole was initially reported to have a mass of 1.96×10^{11} M_{☉}, which would make it the most massive known black hole. It turned out this mass estimated was affected by an incorrect measurement of its C IV width in the DR12Q catalog, amplified by a correction method that exacerbated the mass overestimate. The black hole's mass is now thought to be around 8×10^{9} M_{☉} using quasar MgII emission line correlation.
SDSS J075819.70+202300.9	(7.8±3.9)×10^{9}	Estimated from quasar Hβ emission line correlation.
NGC 5419	7.2+2.7 −1.9×10^{9}	Estimated from the stellar velocity distribution. A secondary satellite SMBH may orbit around 70 parsecs.
CID-947	6.9+0.8 −1.2×10^{9}	Constitutes 10% of the total mass of its host galaxy. Estimated from quasar Hβ emission line correlation.
3C 454.3 secondary	6.8×10^{9}	A likely binary supermassive black hole expected to merge in 57,000 years.
Pōwehi (Messier 87)	6.51+0.78 −0.71×10^{9}	Central galaxy of the Virgo Cluster; the first black hole directly imaged. Previous masses: 7.22+0.34 −0.40×10^{9} M_{☉}, 6.3×10^{9} M_{☉}
SDSS J080956.02+502000.9	(6.46±0.45)×10^{9}	Estimated from quasar Hβ emission line correlation.
SDSS J014214.75+002324.2	(6.31±1.16)×10^{9}	Estimated from quasar MgII emission line correlation.
SDSS J025905.63+001121.9	(5.25±0.73)×10^{9}	Estimated from quasar Hβ emission line correlation.
SDSS J094202.04+042244.5	(5.13±0.71)×10^{9}	Estimated from quasar Hβ emission line correlation.
SDSS J010013.02+280225.8	5×10^{9} – 1.58×10^{10}	
QSO B0746+254	5×10^{9}	
QSO B2149-306	5×10^{9}	
SDSS J090033.50+421547.0	(4.7±0.2)×10^{9}	Estimated from quasar MgII emission line correlation.
Messier 60	(4.5±1.0)×10^{9}	
SDSS J011521.20+152453.3	(4.1±2.4)×10^{9}	Estimated from quasar Hβ emission line correlation.
QSO B0222+185	4×10^{9}	
Hercules A (3C 348)	4×10^{9}	Notable for its million light-year long relativistic jet.
SDSS J075403.60+481428.0	3.89×10^{9}	
SDSS J150752.66+133844.5	3.681×10^{9}	
Abell 1836-BCG	3.61+0.41 −0.50×10^{9}	
SDSS J213023.61+122252.0	(3.5±0.2)×10^{9}	Estimated from quasar Hβ emission line correlation.
SDSS J173352.23+540030.4	(3.4±0.4)×10^{9}	Estimated from quasar MgII emission line correlation.
WISE J104222.11+164115.3	3.24×10^{9}	Estimated from quasar Hα line correlation. Another paper suggests much higher masses of (8.318±0.6)×10^{10} M_{☉} and 8.511+2.2 −1.8×10^{10} M_{☉} based on Hα and Hβ line correlations, however, this is likely inaccurate due to the model not taking into account the reddening of the AGN.
SDSS J025021.76-075749.9	(3.1±0.6)×10^{9}	Estimated from quasar MgII emission line correlation.
NGC 1271	3.0+1.0 −1.1×10^{9}	Compact elliptical or lenticular galaxy in the Perseus Cluster.
SDSS J030341.04-002321.9	(3.0±0.4)×10^{9}	Estimated from quasar MgII emission line correlation.
QSO B0836+710	3×10^{9}	
SDSS J214611.58-070449.2	2.75×10^{9}	
SDSS J162752.18+541912.5	2.75×10^{9}	
SDSS J224956.08+000218.0	(2.63±1.21)×10^{9}	Estimated from quasar Hβ emission line correlation.
SDSS J030449.85-000813.4	(2.4±0.50)×10^{9}	Estimated from quasar Hβ emission line correlation.
SDSS J234625.66-001600.4	(2.24±0.15)×10^{9}	Estimated from quasar Hβ emission line correlation.
ULAS J1120+0641	2×10^{9}	
QSO 0537-286	2×10^{9}	
NGC 3115	2×10^{9}	
Q0906+6930	2×10^{9}	Most distant blazar, at z = 5.47
SDSS J025231.19+034112.7	1.51×10^{9}	
QSO B0805+614	1.5×10^{9}	
Messier 84	1.5×10^{9}	
Pōniuāʻena (J1007+2115)	(1.5±0.2)×10^{9}	Second most-distant quasar known
PKS 2059+034	1.36×10^{9}	
Abell 3565-BCG	1.34+0.21 −0.19×10^{9}	
NGC 7768	1.3+0.5 −0.4×10^{9}	
PG 1426+015	(1.298±0.385)×10^{9} 4.6774×10^{8}	
NGC 1277	1.2×10^{9}	Once thought to harbor a black hole so large that it contradicted modern galaxy formation and evolutionary theories, re-analysis of the data revised it downward to roughly a third of the original estimate, and then one-tenth.
SDSS J233254.46+151305.5	1.094×10^{9}	
QSO B225155+2217	1×10^{9}	
QSO B1210+330	1×10^{9}	
Cygnus A	1×10^{9}	Brightest extrasolar radio source in the sky as seen at frequencies above 1 GHz
Sombrero Galaxy	1×10^{9}	Bolometrically most luminous galaxy in the local universe and also the nearest billion-solar-mass black hole to Earth.
Markarian 501	9×10^{8}–3.4×10^{9}	Brightest object in the sky in very high energy gamma rays.
3C 109	9.3×10^{8}	
3C 273	(8.86±1.87)×10^{8} 5.5×10^{8}	Brightest quasar in the sky
ULAS J1342+0928	8×10^{8}	
SDSS J155053.16+052112.1	7.94×10^{8}	
PG 1700+518	7.81+1.82 −1.65×10^{8} 6.026×10^{7}	
PG 0804+761	(6.93±0.83)×10^{8} 1.9055×10^{8}	
UGC 12591	(6.18±2.61)×10^{8}	
PG 1617+175	(5.94±1.38)×10^{8} 2.7542×10^{8}	
Messier 49	5.6×10^{8}	
SDSS J020151.65+012902.5	5.37×10^{8}	
NGC 1399	5×10^{8}	Central galaxy of the Fornax Cluster
SDSS J113029.48+634620.4	4.90×10^{8}	
II Zwicky 136	(4.57±0.55)×10^{8} 1.4454×10^{8}	
PG 1411+442	(4.43±1.46)×10^{8} 7.943×10^{7}	
PG 1307+085	(4.4±1.23)×10^{8}, 2.8184×10^{8}	
NGC 4261	4×10^{8}	Notable for its 88000 light-year long relativistic jet.
SDSS J134617.54+622045.5	3.98×10^{8}	
PG 0026+129	(3.93±0.96)×10^{8}–5.37×10^{7}	
PG 0052+251	(3.69±0.76)×10^{8}–2.1878×10^{8}	
SAGE0536AGN	3.5±0.8 × 10^{8}	Constitutes 1.4% of the mass of its host galaxy
NGC 1275	3.4×10^{8}	Central galaxy of the Perseus Cluster
3C 390.3	3.3884×10^{8} (2.87±0.64)×10^{8}	
Markarian 876	(2.79±1.29)×10^{8} 2.4×10^{8}	
PG 0953+414	(2.76±0.59)×10^{8} 1.82×10^{8}	
Messier 59	2.7×10^{8}	This black hole has a retrograde rotation.
Fairall 9	(2.55±0.56)×10^{8} 7.943×10^{7}	
Markarian 1095	1.82×10^{8} (1.5±0.19)×10^{8}	
NGC 7727	1.54+0.18 −0.15×10^{8}	with 6.3×10^{6} companion and the closest confirmed BBH to Earth at about 89 million light years away
OJ 287 secondary	1.5×10^{8}	The smaller black hole orbiting OJ 287 primary (see above).
PG 1211+143	(1.46±0.44)×10^{8}, 4.074×10^{7}	
Markarian 509	(1.43±0.12)×10^{8}, 5.755×10^{7}	
Messier 105	1.4×10^{8}–2×10^{8}	
RX J124236.9-111935	1×10^{8}	Observed by the Chandra X-ray Observatory to be tidally disrupting a star.
Messier 85	1×10^{8}	
PG 0844+349	(9.24±3.81)×10^{7} 2.138×10^{7}	
Messier 88	8×10^{7}	
Markarian 771	(7.32±3.52)×10^{7}–7.586×10^{7}	
Messier 81 (Bode's Galaxy)	7×10^{7}	
Messier 58	7×10^{7}	
NGC 5548	(6.71±0.26)×10^{7}–1.23×10^{8}	
3C 120	5.55+3.14 −2.25×10^{7} 2.29×10^{7}	
Centaurus A	5.5×10^{7}	Also notable for its million light-year long relativistic jet.
Markarian 79	5.24±1.44 × 10^{7} 5.25×10^{7}	
Markarian 817	4.94±0.77 × 10^{7} 4.365×10^{7}	
Messier 96	4.8×10^{7} (48000000)	Estimates can be as low as 1.5 million solar masses
NGC 863	4.75±0.74 × 10^{7} 1.77×10^{7}	
NGC 3516	4.27±1.46 × 10^{7} 2.3×10^{7}	
NGC 3227	4.22±2.14 × 10^{7} 3.89×10^{7}	
NGC 4151 primary	4×10^{7}	A small black hole of 1×10^{7} M_{☉} orbits this one (see below)
Markarian 279	(3.49±0.92)×10^{7} 4.17×10^{7}	
Messier 82 (Cigar Galaxy)	3×10^{7}	Prototype starburst galaxy.
NGC 3783	(2.98±0.54)×10^{7} 9.3×10^{6}	
M31* (Andromeda Galaxy)	2.96+3.08 −1.51×10^{7} – 1.41 ^{+0.63}_{−4.4} × 10^{8}	Nearest major galaxy to the Milky Way. This black hole will merge with Sagittarius A* although there is 2% chance of a head-on collision between Andromeda Galaxy and Milky Way Galaxy in the next 4 to 5 billion years and 50% within the next 10 billion years. Masses measured with different methods. (Note: Other masses include: 1.19+2.41 −0.8×10^{8} M_{☉}, 9.4+8.1 −4.35×10^{7} M_{☉}, 6.98+7.88 −3.29×10^{7} M_{☉}, 6.22+3.19 −2.11×10^{7} M_{☉}, 4.36+3.57 −1.96×10^{7} M_{☉}, 3.74+11.43 −1.39×10^{7} M_{☉})
Markarian 110	(2.51±0.61)×10^{7} 5.62×10^{6}	
Messier 108	2.4×10^{7}	
M60-UCD1	2×10^{7}	Constitutes 15% of the mass of its host galaxy.
Markarian 335	(1.42±0.37)×10^{7} 6.31×10^{6}	
NGC 7469	(1.22±0.14)×10^{7}, 6.46×10^{6}	
NGC 4151 secondary	1×10^{7} (10000000)	Orbiting larger companion (see above)
IC 4329A	9.90+17.88 −11.88×10^{6}, 5.01×10^{6}	
NGC 4593	5.36+9.37 −6.95×10^{6}, 8.13×10^{6}	
Messier 61	5×10^{6}	
Sagittarius A*	4.297×10^{6} (8.54×10^{36} kg)	The black hole at the center of the Milky Way Galaxy; second black hole directly imaged (after Pōwehi)
M32*	1.5×10^{6} – 5×10^{6}	A dwarf satellite galaxy of the Andromeda Galaxy.
NGC 4395	3.599×10^{5}; (1.7±0.3)×10^{4}, 1×10^{4}, (8±4)×10^{3} (4×10^{3}–2×10^{4})	May be the smallest supermassive black hole. May also be so-called "intermediate-mass black hole".
For less massive black holes, see List of least massive black holes

== See also ==
=== Black holes ===
- List of nearest known black holes
- List of fastest rotating black holes

=== Stars ===
- List of largest stars
- List of most massive neutron stars
- List of most massive stars

=== Exoplanets ===
- List of most massive exoplanets
- List of largest exoplanets

=== General ===
- List of largest cosmic structures
- List of the most distant astronomical objects
- Lists of astronomical objects
- List of largest galaxies
