= MCG +08-11-011 =

Galaxy in the constellation Auriga

MCG +8-11-11
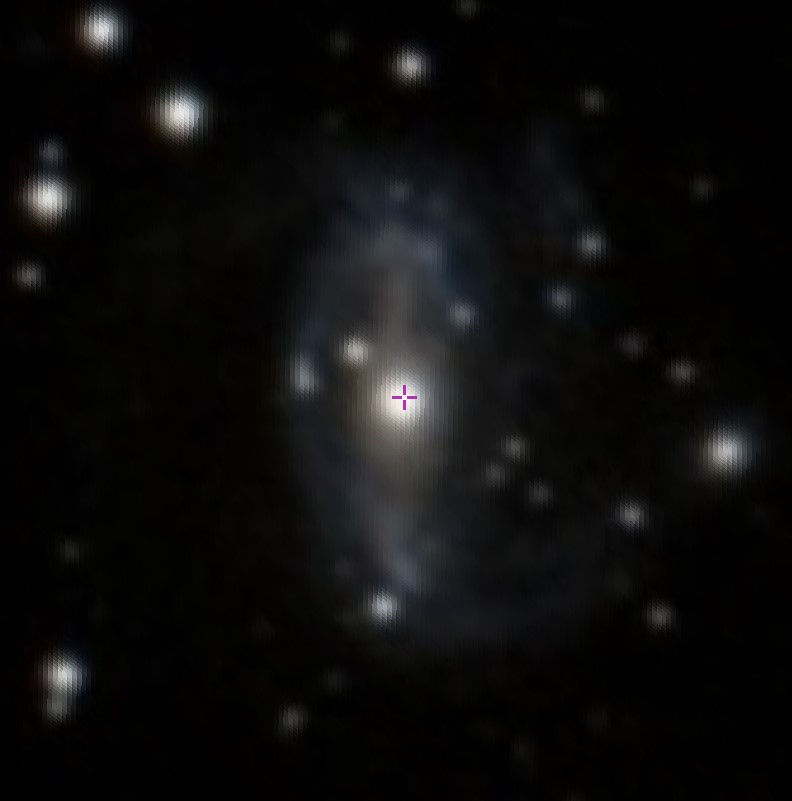
- The Seyfert 1 galaxy MCG +08-11-11 taken with DSS.

Observation data (J2000 epoch)
- Constellation: Auriga
- Right ascension: 05^{h} 54^{m} 53.60^{s}
- Declination: +46° 26′ 21.73″
- Redshift: 0.020457
- Heliocentric radial velocity: 6,133 km/s
- Distance: 401 Mly (123 Mpc)
- Apparent magnitude (V): 14.62
- Apparent magnitude (B): 15.27

Characteristics
- Type: SB0, Sy 1.5
- Size: 488,500 ly (149.83 kpc) (diameter; D_{25} isophote)
- Apparent size (V): 2.1' x 1.5'
- Notable features: Seyfert galaxy

Other designations
- UGC 3374, CGCG 232-003, PGC 18078, IRAS 05511+4625, 7C 0551+4625, TXS 0551+464

MCG +08-11-011 (MCG +8-11-11), also known as UGC 3374, is a galaxy located in the constellation of Auriga. It is located 401 million light years from Earth and is classified as a Seyfert galaxy. MCG +08-11-011 is an active Seyfert 1 galaxy, it hosts an active galactic nucleus (AGN) powered by a supermassive black hole, which produces strong X-ray and ultraviolet emission as material accretes onto it. The galaxy has been extensively observed by X-ray observatories such as XMM-Newton, Suzaku, and NuSTAR, making it an important object for studying the physics of black hole accretion and the structure of the corona in active galaxies.

== Characteristics ==
MCG +8-11-11 is classified a type 1 Seyfert galaxy. It is face-on spiral galaxy located at a projected distance of 123 megaparsecs. It has a soft X-ray luminosity originating from its nuclear core varying between 0.5 and 1×10^{44} erg·s^{−1}. It is also one of the brightest active galactic nuclei (AGN) observed in X-ray bands but radio-quiet. Through detected by most X-ray satellites, the galaxy was not one of the targets noticed by Chandra X-ray Observatory. It has an X-ray spectrum fitted by an estimated power law of Γ = 1.8 with an undetermined iron line likely originating from distant matter. The galaxy has soft gamma-ray emission at 3.9 σ level, higher than 90 keV.

Additionally, MCG +8-11-11 contains X-ray fluxes. Based on observations by the INTErnational Gamma-ray Astrophysics Observation (INTEGRAL), they have measurements of F_{20−100 keV} = 8.46×10^{−11} erg·cm^{−2}·s^{−1} and F_{2−10 keV} = 5.62×10^{−11} erg·cm^{−2}·s^{−1} respectively. Based from a spectral analysis conducted by NuSTAR, the galaxy has a bolometric luminosity estimated as L_{bol} = 14.2×10^{44} erg·s^{−1}. Furthermore, the black hole in MCG +8-11-11 has a mass of M_{BH} = 7.19 ± 0.02 M_{Θ} and an Eddington ratio of 7.54×10^{−1}. The thermal emission from its accretion disk is hot with a temperature of kT = 0.088+0.018
−0.007 keV.

== Observations ==
MCG +8-11-11 has been observed in many occasions. In July 1995, its powerful gamma-ray flux was detected during a High Energy Astronomical Telescope balloon flight, suggesting its hard X-ray spectral feature was caused by a double-Compton backscattering exerted on its external cloud. A Suzaku observation conducted in 2010 finds out the galaxy exhibits spectral signatures from its accretion disk.

In November 2014, data from the observation by the 118 ks Chandra High Energy Transmission Gratings found MCG +8-11-11 shows lack of warm absorption and its Compton reflection signatures are described by out of direction material from the naked eye, based on an inclination angle of θ = 41+18
−30 obtained by a MYTorus model. Between 2019 and 2020, it was determined that MCG +8-11-11 has a host-corrected AGN luminosity of 5100 Ά of (4.21±0.65)×10^{43} erg·s^{−1} and a large disk-size according to a photometric reverberation mapping conducted by the Wise Observatory.

== Radio source ==
MCG +8-11-11 hosts a triple radio source in its center with a projected size of 400 parsecs and an S-shaped morphology. However the central compartment of the source has a small diameter of 30 parsecs and is possibly confirmed as the active galaxy's core. The source is also found embedded in diffused emission with a major-axis position angle similar to its bar but offset by 50 degrees.
