= RX J1532.9+3021 =

Galaxy cluster in Corona Borealis

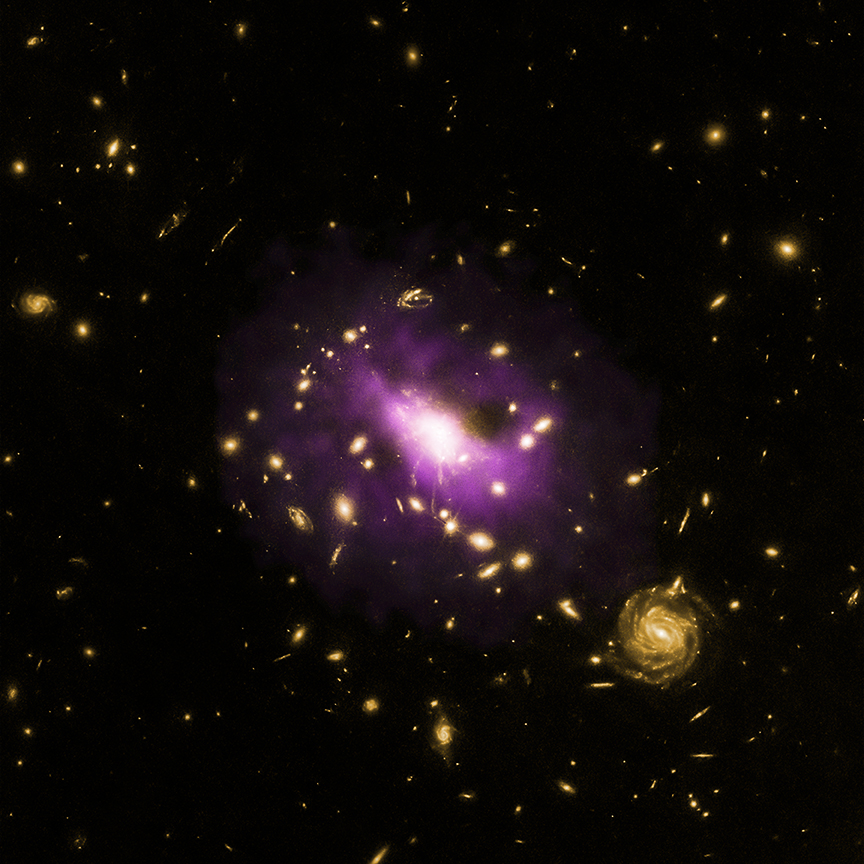
- Chandra X-ray Observatory image of the galaxy cluster, RX J1532.9+3021.

Observation data (Epoch J2000.0)
- Constellation: Corona Borealis
- Right ascension: 15^{h} 32^{m} 53.8^{s}
- Declination: +30° 20′ 59″
- Brightest member: LEDA 1900245
- Richness class: 1
- Redshift: 0.362000
- Distance: 3.9 billion light-years
- Notable features: One of the largest black holes discovered so far inside a galaxy cluster

Other designations
- MACS J1532.9+3021, MCS J1532.8+3021, CIG J1532+3021

RX J1532.9+3021 is a galaxy cluster located in the constellation of Corona Borealis. It has a velocity of 103,539 ± 8 kilometers per second, equivalent to a Hubble distance of 1,527.1 ± 106.9 megaparsecs or 3.9 billion light years. It is classified one of the massive and strongest X-ray bright cool clusters in the universe at redshift z = 0.362. The luminosity of the cluster is estimated to be 6 × 10^{45} ergs^{−1}. According to a study published in 2013, a mini radio halo is seen surrounding the cluster.

== LEDA 1900245 ==
The elliptical galaxy LEDA 1900245, is the brightest cluster galaxy (BCG) of RX J1532.9+3021. It has a dimension of around 120.56 kpc (~393,000 light-years) and is a LINER galaxy, meaning a galaxy whose nucleus contains an emission spectrum characterized by broad lines of weak ion atoms. First noted as a radio source back in 1990, the galaxy is classified as a blazar producing extensive amounts of star formation that is similar to other BCGs, such as the Phoenix Cluster and in NGC 1275. It is also known to host a large amount of molecular gas with ultraviolet filaments.

Observations by Chandra Space Telescope found out, LEDA 1900245 hosts one of the powerful and most massive black holes measuring 10 billion solar masses. According to X-ray images, the galaxy shows two large X-ray cavities or bubbles of emitted hot gas. Each of the cavities measures 100,000 light-years across and are causing shock fronts to release most energy. The amount of energy released would then cause more hot gas to be generated, thus hampering any efforts in producing any new stars in the galaxy.

== Gravitational lensed supernova ==
A gravitational lensed supernova was discovered in early 2012 behind RX J1532.9+3021. Known as SN CLN12Did, the supernova was located at redshift z = 0.851, with its host being an early-type possible elliptical galaxy.

== Gallery ==
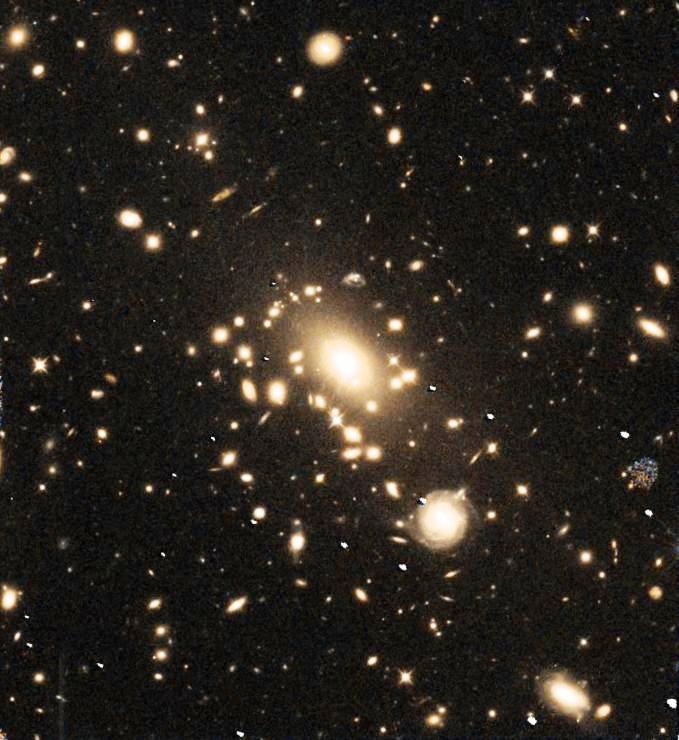
Hubble Space Telescope image of RX J1532.9+3021.

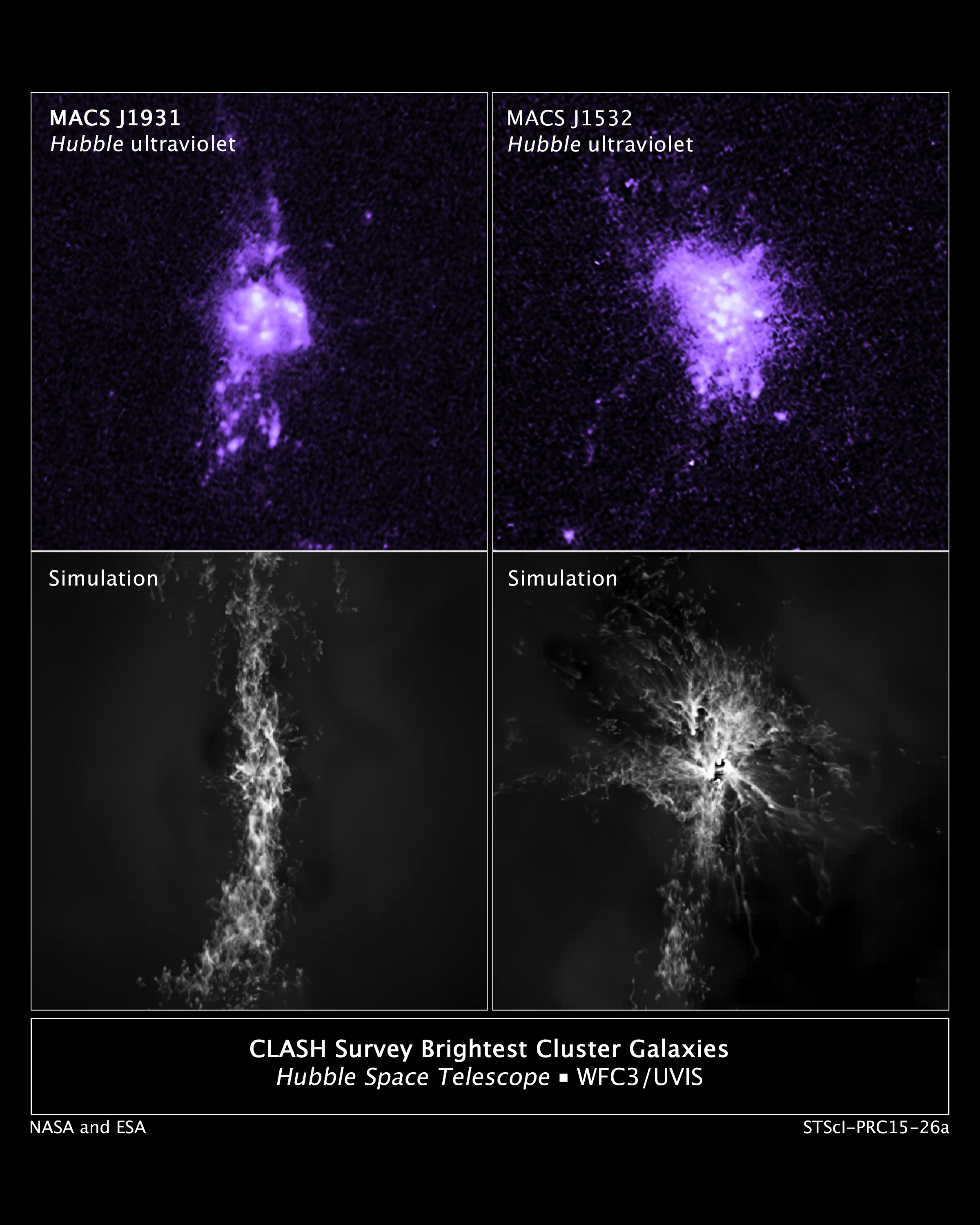
RX J1532.9+3021 taken with CLASH Survey. The image shows the high energy jets released by the supermassive black hole, affecting star formations in the brightest cluster galaxy.

== See also ==
- List of the most largest black holes
- X-ray astronomy
- Galaxy cluster
- Abell 2142
