= NGC 1600 =

Galaxy in the constellation Eridanus

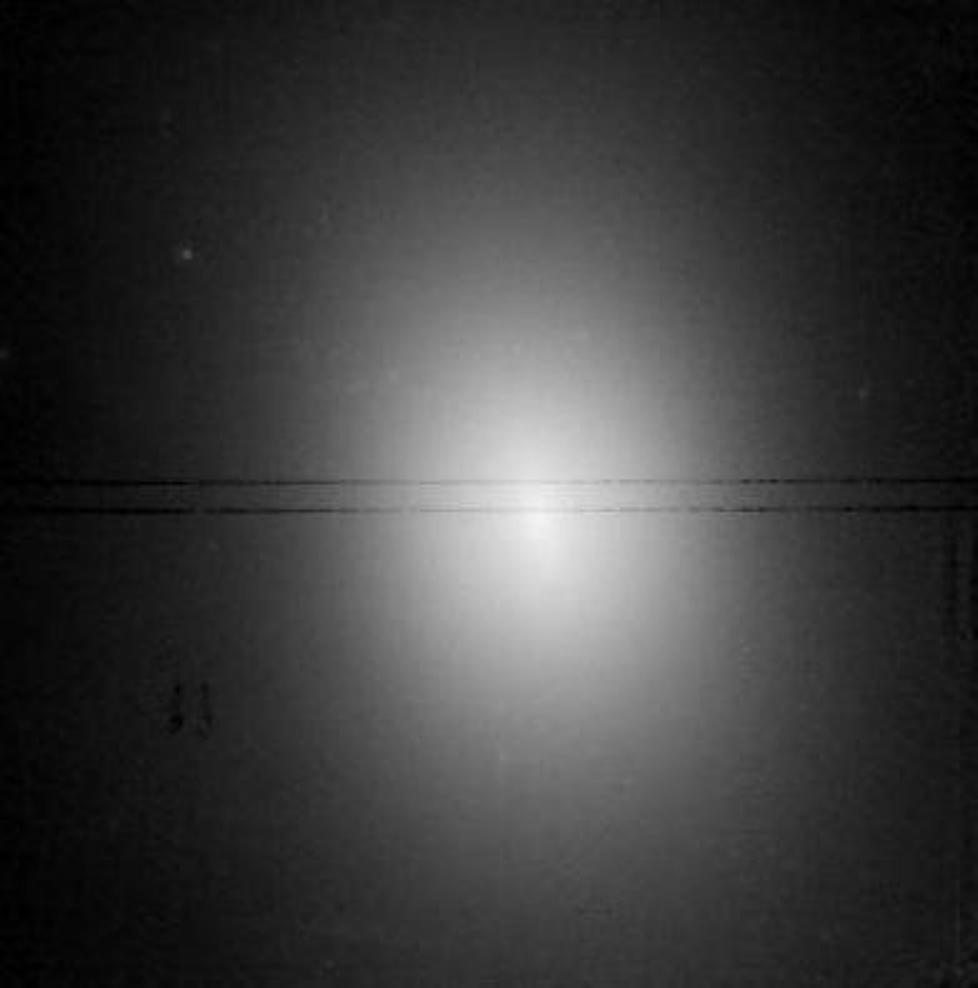
- Image derived from data taken by the Hubble Space Telescope.

Observation data (J2000 epoch)
- Constellation: Eridanus
- Right ascension: 4^{h} 31^{m} 39.9^{s}
- Declination: −5° 05′ 10″
- Redshift: 0.015614
- Heliocentric radial velocity: 4681 km/s
- Distance: 45,770 kpc (149,300 kly)
- Group or cluster: group
- Apparent magnitude (V): 11.93

Characteristics
- Type: E3 or E4
- Mass: 1×10^{12} M_{☉}
- Mass/Light ratio: 10.58 M_{☉}/L_{☉}
- Apparent size (V): 2.5 x 1.7 arcminutes

Other designations
- LEDA 15406, PGC 15406

NGC 1600 is an elliptical galaxy in the constellation Eridanus, 149 Mly (46 Mpc) away from Earth.

== Cluster membership ==
Often described as being an isolated early-type galaxy, it is known to have at least 30 fainter satellite galaxies, including NGC 1601 and NGC 1603. The galaxy has been observed to have boxy isophotes and little rotation. The presence of H-alpha indicates possible ongoing star formation, and the galaxy is a known source of X-ray emissions. It is believed that NGC 1600 is the product of a galaxy merger which took place over 4 Gyr ago. The age of the galaxy is estimated at 4.6–8.8 Gyr.

The system consisting of NGC 1600 and its surrounding galaxies shares some similarities to fossil galaxy groups, but is not exactly the same. For example, it has an unusually high concentration of dark matter, similar to fossil groups. However, the X-ray luminosity is less than 5×10^{41} erg s^{−1}, the threshold for fossil groups.

== Supermassive black hole ==
NGC 1600 has a diffuse distribution of stars near its center, caused by the influence of the galaxy's central black hole. Despite NGC 1600 being of typical size, the supermassive black hole at its center is unusually large, with a mass of 17 ± 1.5 billion solar masses (M_{☉}), making it one of the largest known. At the time of the determination of the size of the black hole, in 2016, it was found to be unusual in its location in relation to the galaxy population of the region. Previously, extremely large black holes were only found in the hearts of large dense rich clusters, the galaxy group for which NGC 1600 is found is only an average galaxy group and not a rich cluster. This discovery could signify previously unknown populations of very large black holes, and that black hole growth models may be incorrect or incomplete.

== Gallery ==
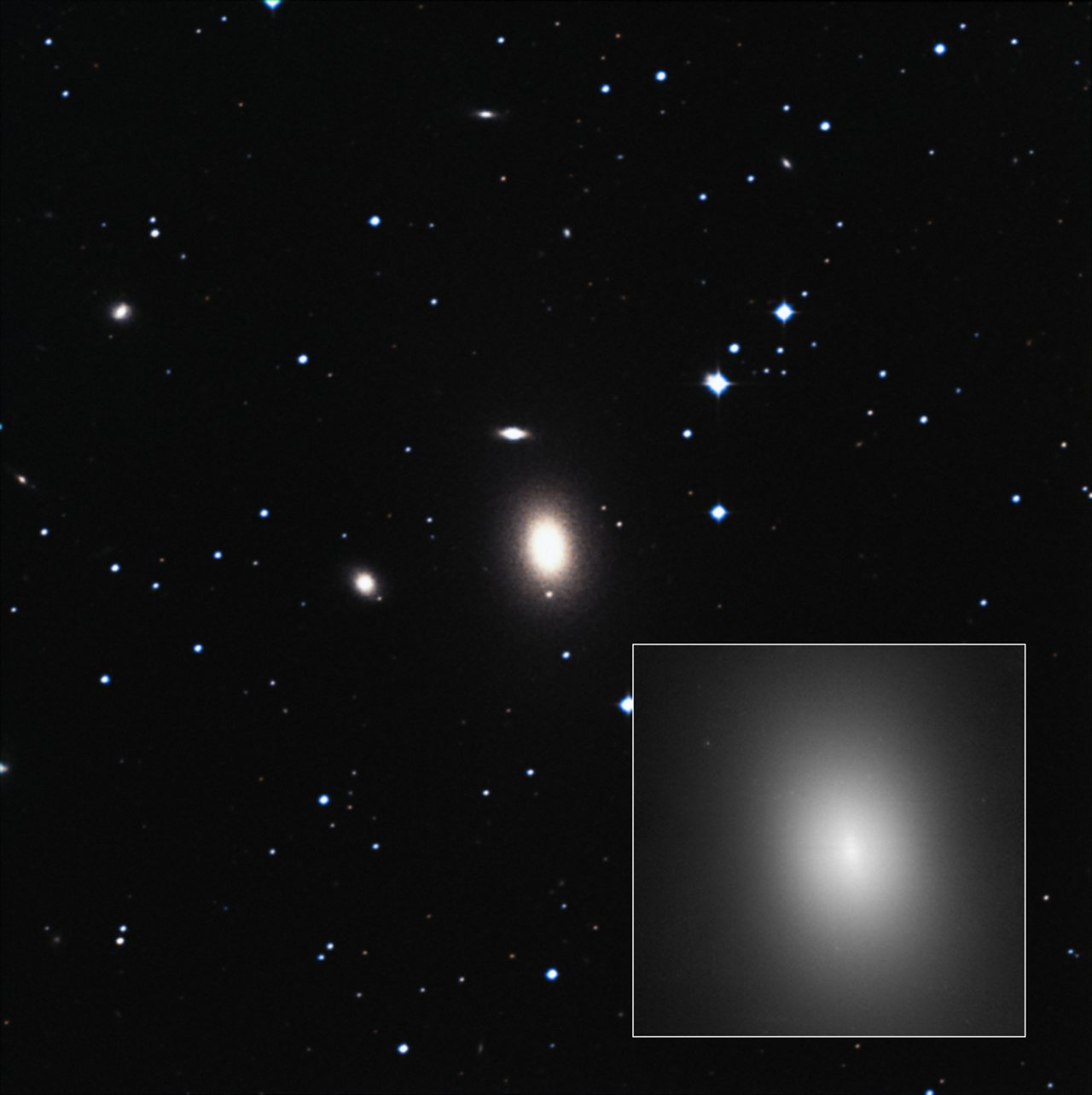
Elliptical galaxy NGC 1600 is located in a galaxy group about 200 million light-years away.

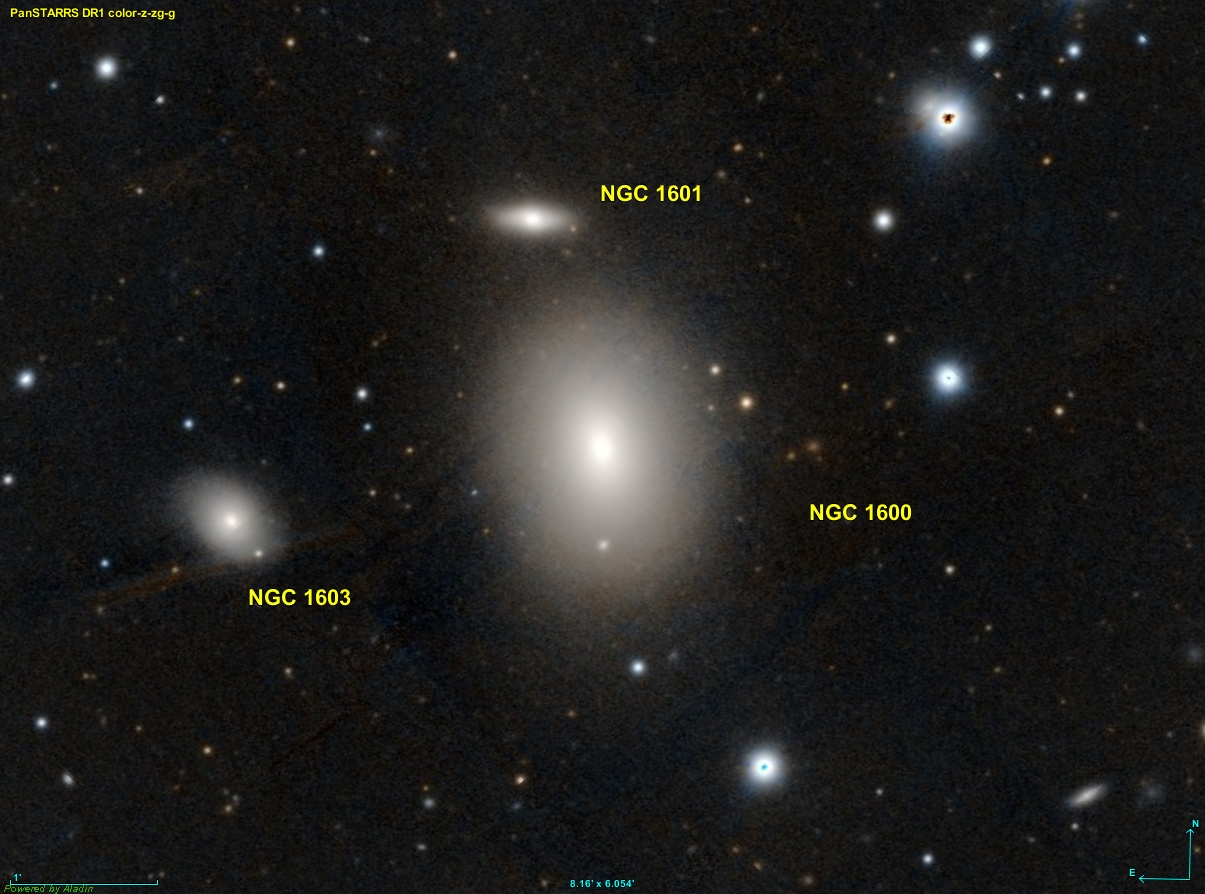
PanSTARRS image of NGC 1600 and surrounding galaxies NGC 1601 and NGC 1603
