= 4C +37.11 =

Radio galaxy and elliptical galaxy in the constellation Perseus

Observation data (J2000 epoch)
- Constellation: Perseus
- Right ascension: 04^{h} 05^{m} 49.2^{s}
- Declination: +38° 03′ 32″
- Redshift: 16,500 ± 300 km/s
- Distance: 750 Mly (230 Mpc)
- Apparent magnitude (V): 17.2

Characteristics
- Type: Sy
- Size: ~450,400 ly (138.10 kpc) (estimated)

Other designations
- GLXY J0405+380, B2 0402+37, 2MASX J04054928+3803320, RX J0405.8+3803, PGC 2820486

4C +37.11 or Galaxy 0402+379 is a radio galaxy and elliptical galaxy featuring binary supermassive black holes with the least separation of any directly observed binaries, as of 2006. The separation between the two is 24 light-years or 7.3 parsecs, with an orbital period of 30,000 years. The two supermassive black holes, about 750 million light years from earth (230 million parsecs from earth), have a current estimated combined mass of about 28 ± 8 billion M_{☉}.

Other supermassive binary black hole candidates suggest the smaller separation distances expected as they eventually merge, but have not been confirmed. For example, quasar OJ 287 is inferred to have a binary supermassive black hole pair with an orbital period of 12 years, and thus be much closer together. However these have not been directly measured and additional observation, possibly over extended time periods, is needed.

The eventual collision of the pair, which should stay apart for at least a few million more years, would result in strong gravitational waves.
