= Cosmic Horseshoe =

Gravitationally lensed galaxy

SDSS J114833.14+193003.2
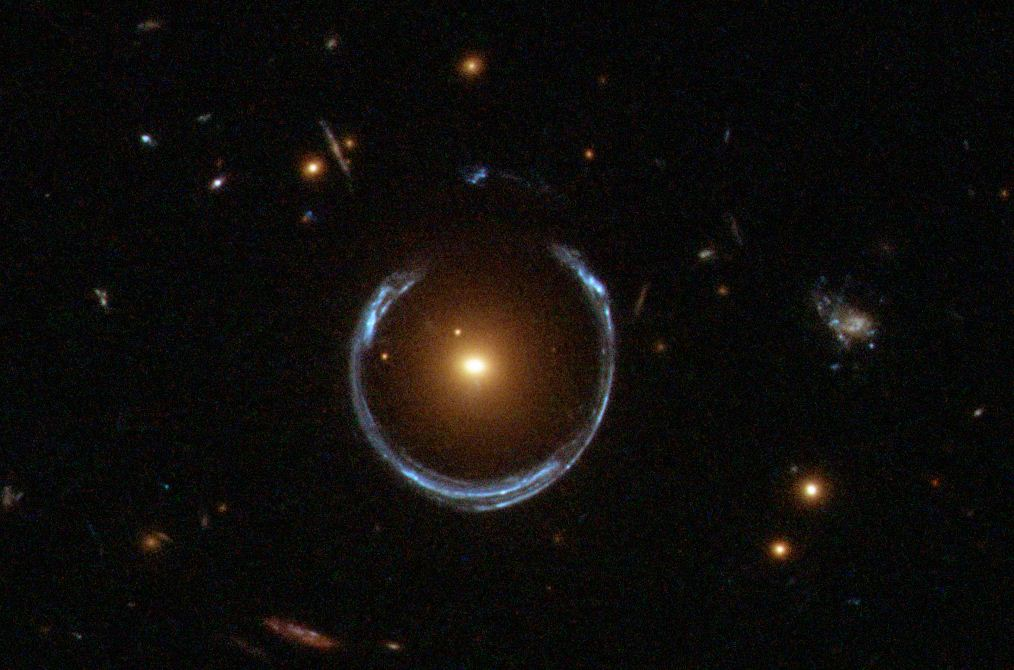
- The Cosmic Horseshoe taken using the Wide Field Camera 3 of the Hubble Space Telescope.

Observation data (J2000 epoch)
- Constellation: Leo
- Right ascension: 11^{h} 48^{m} 33.1^{s}
- Declination: 19° 30′ 03″
- Redshift: 0.4457 (foreground galaxy); 2.379 (lensed galaxy)
- Distance: 5.628 Gly (1.726 Gpc) (foreground galaxy); 18.884 Gly (5.790 Gpc) (lensed galaxy)h^{−1}_{0.696}
- Apparent magnitude (B): 20.3

Characteristics
- Type: E (Luminous red galaxy) (foreground galaxy)
- Mass: 5.2 trillion M_{☉}
- Notable features: Gravitationally lensed system

Other designations
- SDSS J114833.14+193003.2

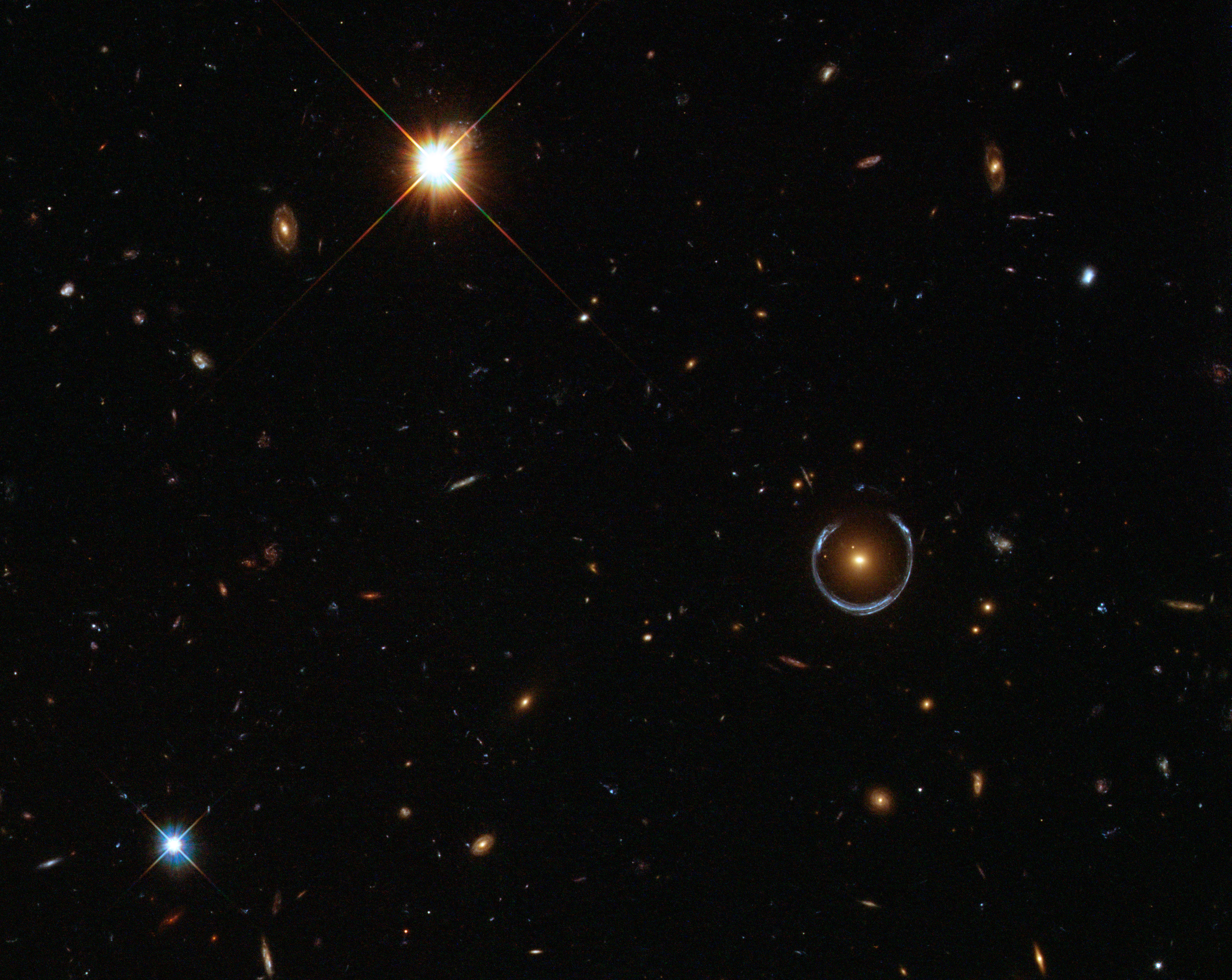
The Cosmic Horseshoe

The Cosmic Horseshoe is the nickname given to a gravitationally lensed system of two galaxies in the constellation Leo.

The foreground galaxy lies directly in front in the line of sight to a more distant galaxy. Due to the passage of the light from the background galaxy through the gravity field of the foreground galaxy, the background galaxy's light is lensed by the warped spacetime environment of the foreground galaxy, thus giving the background galaxy a warped appearance. Unlike most lensed galaxies, the shape of the lensed light of this background galaxy appears shaped like a horseshoe.

The foreground galaxy, LRG 3-757, is found to be extremely massive, with a mass a hundred times that of the Milky Way galaxy. It is notable because it belongs to a rare class of galaxies called luminous red galaxies, which has an extremely luminous infrared emission.

The system was discovered in 2007 by an international team of scientists using the comprehensive Sloan Digital Sky Survey and is greatly studied by the Hubble Space Telescope.

There is a supermassive black hole with a mass of 36.31+5.50
−6.25 billion solar masses (M_{☉}) at the center of the Cosmic Horseshoe gravitational lens, making it one of the most massive known black holes.
