= PKS 0537−286 =

Quasar in the constellation Columba

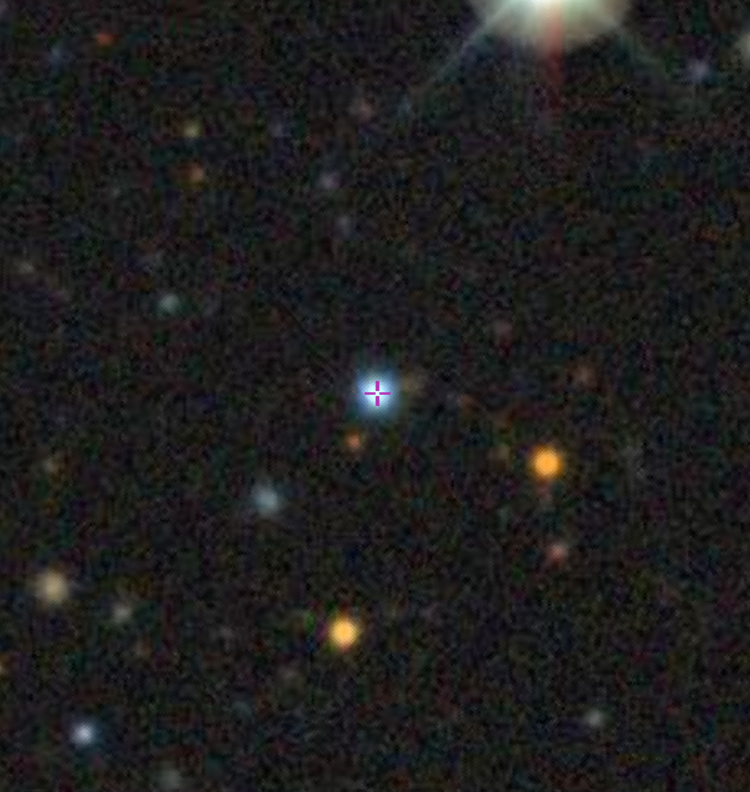
- PKS 0537−286 taken by DESI Legacy Surveys

Observation data (J2000.0 epoch)
- Constellation: Columba
- Right ascension: 05^{h} 39^{m} 54.281^{s}
- Declination: −28° 39′ 55.95″
- Redshift: 3.104000
- Heliocentric radial velocity: 930,556 km/s
- Distance: 11.4 Gly (light travel time distance)
- Apparent magnitude (V): 0.54
- Apparent magnitude (B): 0.43
- Surface brightness: 18.1

Characteristics
- Type: FSQR;Blazar

Other designations
- PMN J0539−2839, BZQ J0539−2839, PGC 2824447, MRC 0537−286, NVSS J053954−283956, PKS B0537−286, OG −263, TXS 0537−286, 2FGL 0539.3−2841, IRCF J053954.2−283955, 2XMM J053954.2−283956, RX J0539.9−2839

PKS 0537−286 (referred to as QSO 0537−286), also known as QSO B0537−286, is a quasar located in the constellation Columba. With a redshift of 3.104, the object is located 11.4 billion light years away and belongs to the flat-spectrum radio quasar (FSRQ) blazar subclass. It is one of the most luminous known high-redshift quasars.

== Observation history ==
First detected at radio frequencies in 1975, PKS 0537−286 was observed at X-rays by the Einstein observatory. It was later studied by ASCA, ROSAT, XMM and subsequently Swift. These observations showed PKS 0537−286 as extremely luminous quasar ( L_{x}=10^{47} erg s^{−1} in the 0.1-2 keV range) with a particularly hard spectrum (r = 1 measured by Swift/BAT), which in the γ-ray band, it shows an energy flux of (1.44 ± 0.006) × 10−11 erg cm−2 s−1 in the fourth catalogue of Fermi-LAT active galactic nuclei. A weak iron K emission line and reflection features is also found in PKS 0537−286. Moreover, Sowards-Emmerd et al. (2004) identified the quasar as probable counterpart of the EGRET source 3EG J0531−2940.

== Characteristics ==
PKS 0537−286 is the brightest blazar beyond z = 3.0. It shows characteristic properties of blazars, such as (rapid variability, strong polarization and high brightness) which are widely attributed to a powerful relativistic jet oriented close to the line of sight.

Moreover, in several occasions, γ-ray flares were observed when the daily flux was above 10−6 photon cm−2 s−1. This makes PKS 0537−286 the most distant γ-ray flaring blazar. The broad-band emission from PKS 0537−286 was successfully modelled within a one-zone synchrotron and external inverse Compton scenario where the excess in optical and ultraviolet bands was interpreted as emission from bright thermal accretion disc. Moreover, PKS 0537−286 shows an emission redshift of 3.11, a prominent absorption system at a redshift of 2.976, and a strong discontinuity at the Lyman-continuum edge in the absorption system.

=== Supermassive black hole ===
The central supermassive black hole in PKS 0537−286 is one of the largest and heaviest black holes known, with a high accretion rate. Based on a study published in 2010, the black hole contains a 2 billion solar masses.
