= Abell 1201 BCG =

Galaxy in the constellation Leo

Abell 1201 Brightest Cluster Galaxy
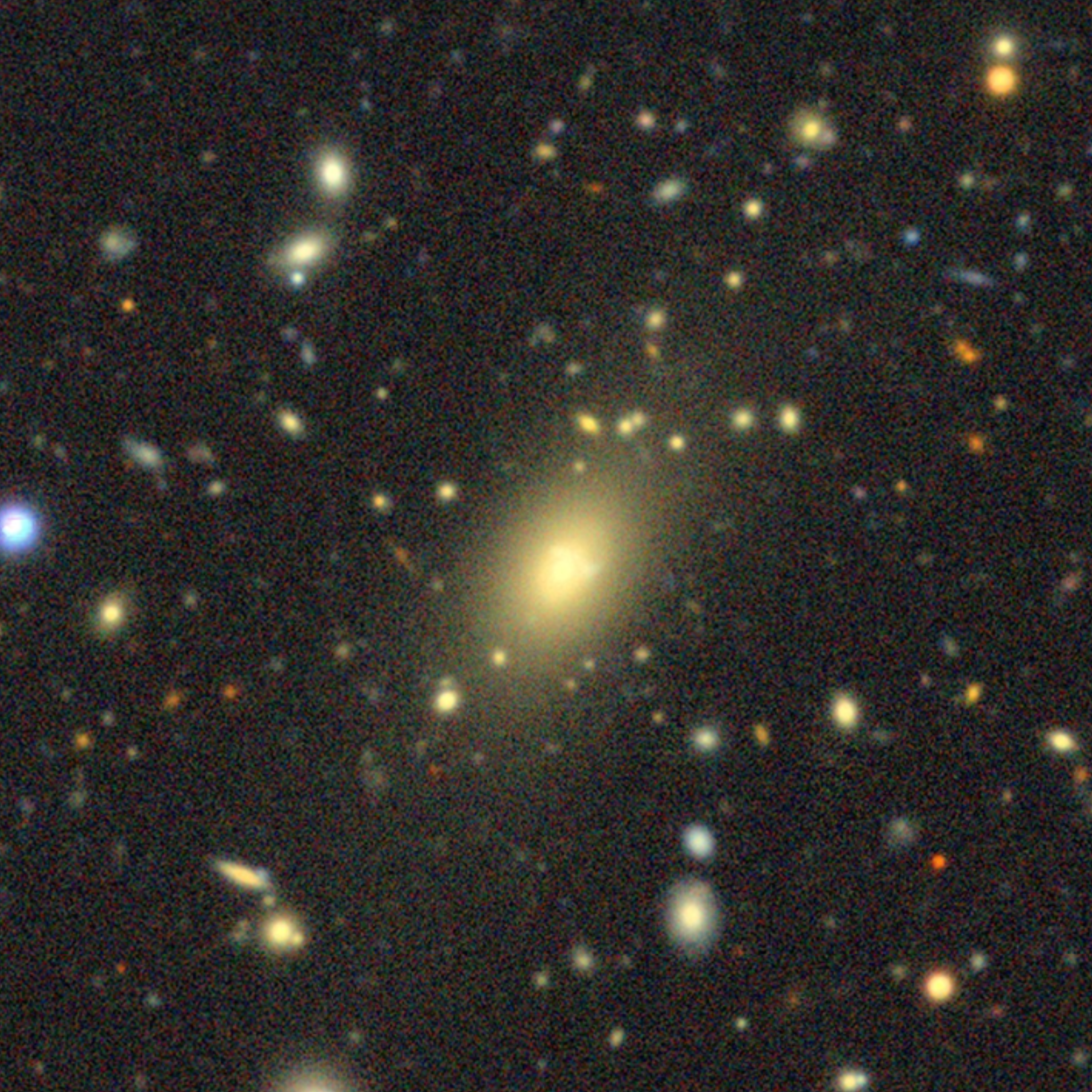
- Image by the DESI Legacy Imaging Surveys, Data Release 10

Observation data (J2000 epoch)
- Constellation: Leo
- Right ascension: 11^{h} 13^{m} 01.1^{s}
- Declination: +13° 25′ 40″
- Redshift: 0.169
- Distance: 2.735 Gly (838.5 Mpc)
- Group or cluster: Abell 1201
- Absolute magnitude (V): -24.23 ± 0.09

Characteristics
- Type: E3 elliptical galaxy, brightest cluster galaxy
- Size: ~485,200 ly (148.76 kpc) (diameter; 2MASS K-band total mag)
- Apparent size (V): 0.38 × 0.29
- Half-light radius (physical): 15 kpc

Other designations
- LEDA 1430978

Abell 1201 BCG (short for Abell 1201 Brightest Cluster Galaxy) is a type-cD massive elliptical galaxy residing as the brightest cluster galaxy (BCG) of the Abell 1201 galaxy cluster. At a redshift of 0.169, this system is around 2.735 billion light-years (838.5 million parsecs) from Earth, and offset about 11 kiloparsecs from the X-ray peak of the intracluster gas. With an ellipticity of 0.32±0.02, the stellar distribution is far from spherical. In solar units, the total stellar luminosity is 4×10^{11} L_{☉} in SDSS r-band, and 1.6×10^{12} L_{☉} in 2MASS K-band. Half the stars orbit within an effective radius of 15 kpc, and their central velocity dispersion is about 285 km s^{−1} within 5 kpc rising to 360 km s^{−1} at 20 kpc distance.

The BCG also acts as a gravitational lens, bending the light of a more distant background galaxy (at redshift 0.451) into an apparent tangential arc about 6 kpc to one side. This makes the galaxy an important case in investigations of the intrinsic properties of dark matter.

Detail from a full-scale image of Abell 1201 BCG taken by MUSE with the gray-scale modified to reveal the tangential arc

Detailed models of the lens mass distribution, starlight and stellar kinematics indicates that the galaxy cluster's dark halo has a shallow inner density gradient and perhaps a soft dark matter core. At face value, this is incompatible with the dark matter cusp predicted by collisionless cold dark matter theories, and adds to evidence that dark matter experiences additional non-gravitational forces.

Years later, a faint smaller counterimage to the arc was discovered at a closer radius. Explaining the position and brightness of this counterimage requires a dark central concentration of unseen mass. Based on lens modelling, it could be a supermassive black hole equivalent to 13 billion suns: (1.3±0.6)×10^{10} M_{☉}. At the time of measurement, this is one of the most massive black hole candidates (without relying on assumptions about quasar luminosities and efficiencies). This UMBH may be ten times larger than expected from the usual scaling relations between black holes and host galaxies.

However, alternative methods of modelling the stellar velocity dispersion maps (accounting for an aggregate constraint on the lens mass) reveals an ambiguity between the UMBH mass and the dark halo profile. In solutions where the UMBH is more massive, the dark matter is more cuspy. In solutions where the UMBH is smaller or absent, the dark matter is more cored. The dark halo's ellipticity and the mass-to-light ratio of stars also enter the ambiguity. Thus, if the standard computational models are robust, then Abell 1201 BCG presents a dilemma and a challenge to either the conventional ideas of black hole growth or the simplest theories about dark matter, or both.

In 2023, a follow-up study of higher resolution images with greater signal-to-noise ratio, using lens modelling techniques, strongly supported the presence of a central supermassive black hole and provided a lower as well as an upper limit and an upward revision of its mass to (3.27±2.12)×10^{10} M_{☉} (with the range being 11.5 billion M_{☉} to 53.9 billion M_{☉}). If correct, this would be the first identification and mass determination of a supermassive black hole using analysis of a gravitational lens, a method the authors suggest could be useful for the discovery of more supermassive black holes at higher redshift, i.e., outside the local universe, which previously has been limited to actively accreting black holes.

== See also ==
- Scalar field dark matter
