= Markarian 876 =

Galaxy in the constellation Draco

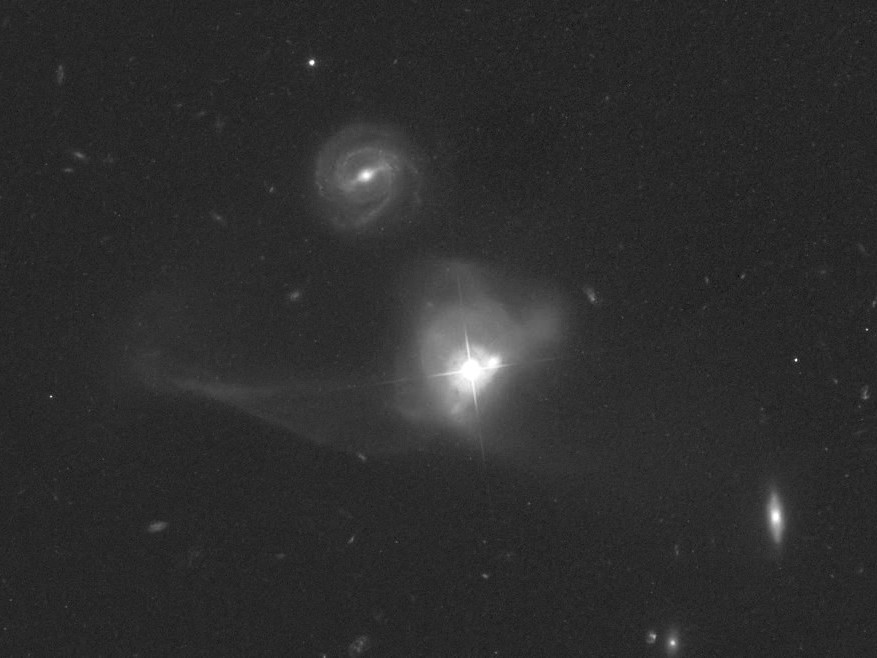
- HST image of Markarian 876.

Observation data (J2000.0 epoch)
- Constellation: Draco
- Right ascension: 16^{h} 13^{m} 57.17^{s}
- Declination: +65° 43′ 09.98″
- Redshift: 0.121090
- Heliocentric radial velocity: 36,302 km/s
- Distance: 1.752 Gly (537.16 Mpc)
- Apparent magnitude (V): 15.49
- Apparent magnitude (B): 16.03

Characteristics
- Type: E2, Sy1
- Size: 117.72 kiloparsecs (384,000 light-years) (diameter; 2MASS K-band total isophote)

Other designations
- PGC 57553, PG 1613+658, IRAS 16136+6550, RBS 1567, 2E 3624, 2MASX J16135722+6543096

Markarian 876 (Mrk 876) known as PG 1613+658, is an elliptical galaxy located in the constellation of Draco. With a velocity relative to the cosmic microwave background of 36,302 ± 60 kilometers per seconds, the galaxy is located 1.75 billion light years from Earth. It is a Seyfert galaxy.

== Characteristics ==
Markarian 876 is classified as a large galaxy with a distorted morphology. It has tidal tails extending out from the galaxy by more than 50 arcsecs or 85 kiloparsecs (kpc). The structure of the galaxy appears lopsided and complicated with a secondary nucleus or knot of light located 1.6 arcsec west of the main nucleus. A barred spiral galaxy companion is found lying at the same redshift, indicating the peculiar structure in Markarian 876 might be directly caused by a strong gravitational interaction with the object. However the companion galaxy is located 23 arcsecs north and doesn't seem to tidally connect with Markarian 876, therefore the latter's distorted morphology is likely caused by a galaxy merger.

The mass of the black hole in the center of Markarian 876 is estimated to be (2.2 ± 1.0) × 10^{8} M_{☉} based on an optical reverberation campaign.

An emission line is found connected with the source of the galaxy with a rest-frame energy of 4.80^{+0.05}_{-0.04} keV.
