= Q0906+6930 =

Blazar in the constellation Ursa Major

Q0906+6930 or QSO J0906+6930
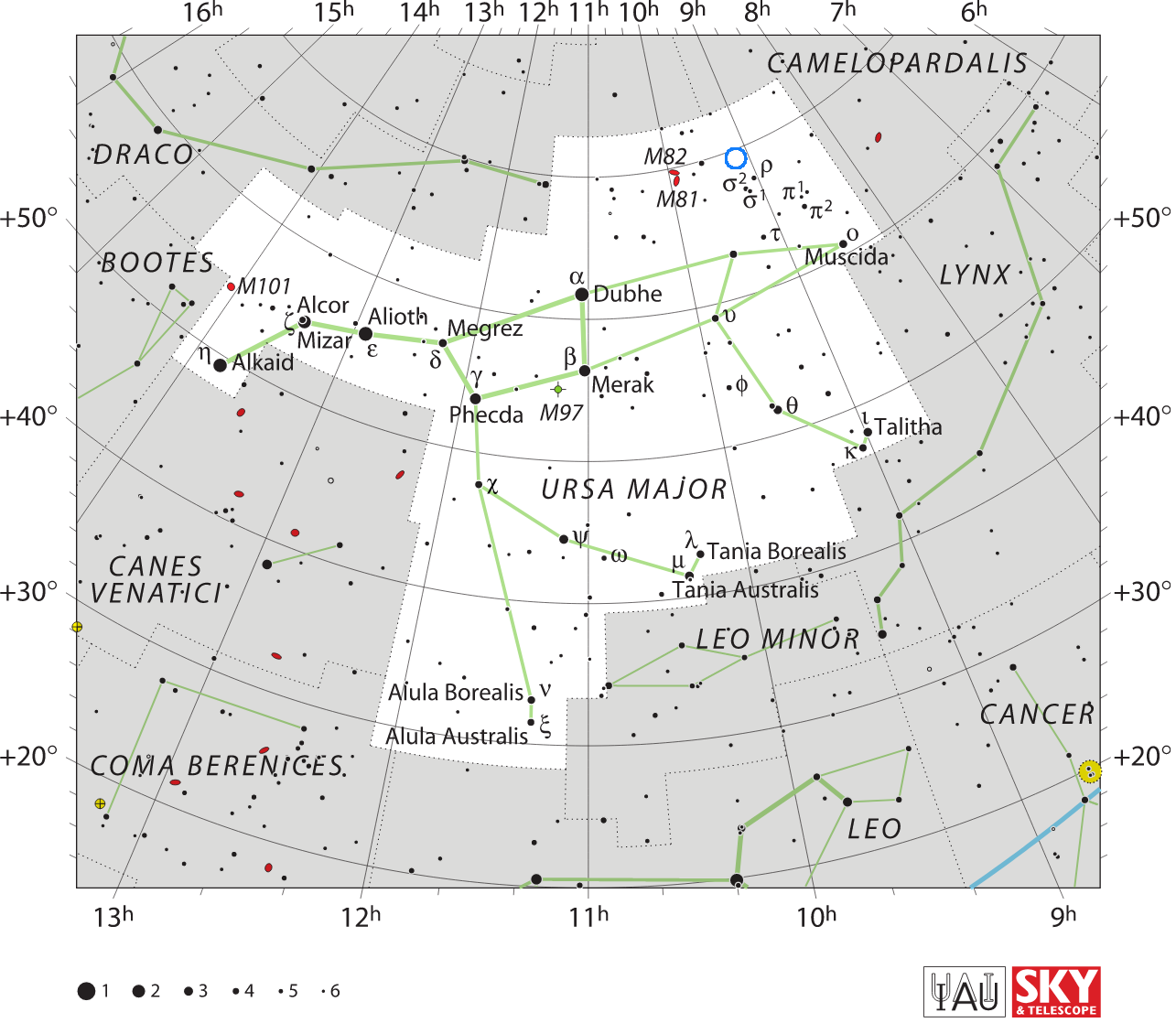
- Location of Q0906+6930 (circled in blue)

Observation data (Epoch J2000)
- Constellation: Ursa Major
- Right ascension: 09^{h} 06^{m} 30.75^{s}
- Declination: +69° 30′ 30.8″
- Redshift: 5.47
- Distance: 12.3 billion light-years (Light travel time)
- Type: Blazar

Other designations
- QSO B0901+6942, CLASS B0901+697, GB6 J0906+6930, QSO J0906+6930, BWE 0901+6942, GB6 B0901+6942, 87GB 090153.2+694215.

Q0906+6930 was the most distant known blazar (redshift 5.47 / 12.2 billion light years) at the time of its discovery in July, 2004. The engine of the blazar is a supermassive black hole (SMBH) approximately 2 billion times the mass of the Sun (the mass of the Milky Way Galaxy is around 1.5 trillion solar masses). The event horizon volume is on the order of 1,000 times that of the Solar System. It is one of the most massive black holes on record.

== Distance measurements ==
The "distance" of a far away galaxy depends on the distance measurement used. With a redshift of 5.47, light from this active galaxy is estimated to have taken around 12.3 billion light-years to reach Earth. But since this galaxy is receding from Earth at an estimated rate of 285,803 km/s (the speed of light is 299,792 km/s), the present (co-moving) distance to this galaxy is estimated to be around 26 billion light-years (7961 Mpc).

== Statistics ==
- Classification: FSRQ
- R = 19.9
- Power (BL Lac) = 1.4-3.5
