= PKS 2126−158 =

Quasar in the constellation Capricornus

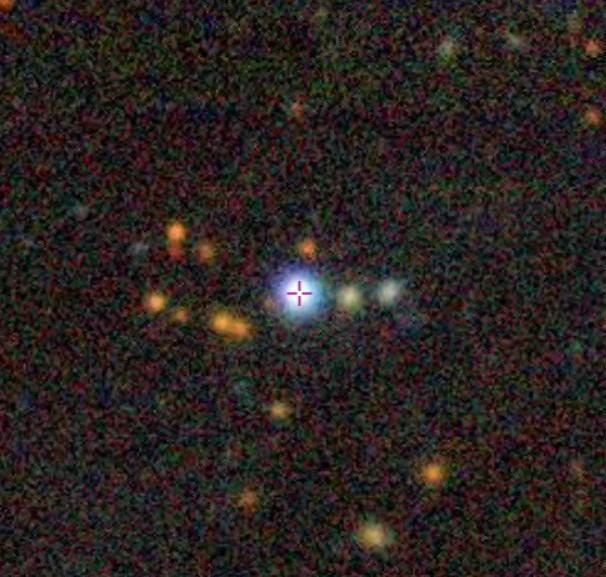
- PKS 2126−158 seen on DESI Legacy Surveys

Observation data (J2000.0 epoch)
- Constellation: Capricornus
- Right ascension: 21^{h} 29^{m} 12.176^{s}
- Declination: −15° 38′ 41.04″
- Redshift: 3.268000
- Heliocentric radial velocity: 979,722 km/s
- Distance: 11.5 Gly (light travel time distance)
- Apparent magnitude (V): 0.216
- Apparent magnitude (B): 0.286
- Surface brightness: 16.1

Characteristics
- Type: LPQ;GPS, FRSQ

Other designations
- 2MASS J212912.18−1538410, OX −146, PKS 2126−15, PGC 4681153, IRCF J212912.1−153841, 2E 4479, SWIFT J2129.1−1538, PMN J2129−1538, NVSS J212912−153841

PKS 2126−158 (referred to QSO B2126−158), also known as PKS 2126−15, is a quasar located in Capricornus. It has a redshift of 3.268000, which corresponds to the distance of 11.5 billion light years. It is classified as a gigahertz peaked-spectrum quasar (GPS) with a flat-spectrum radio source and a blazar, a type of active galaxy shooting an astrophysical jet towards Earth.

== Characteristics ==
First identified by astronomers in 1977 who were studying an optical follow-up of flat-spectrum sources from the Parkes 2700 MHz surveys, and subsequently by the Imaging Proportional Counter by the Einstein Observatory in 1981, PKS 2126−158 was only the fifth radio quasar with z > 3 to have its redshift measured. It is found to have an emission-line redshift of 3.270 + or - 0.004 and a rich absorption spectrum shortward of Ly-alpha.

PKS 2126−158 is a notable bright object emitting radio signals of S_{2.7 GHz}= 1.17 Jy, optical with near-infrared rays of V= 16.92, H= 14.89 and X-ray (F_{0.1−2.4 keV}= 2 × 10−12 erg s-1 cm −2) frequencies. Such fluxes, combined with the high redshift, meant PKS 2126−158 is one of the most luminous quasars known.

Notably, an optical/near-infrared spectrum showed PKS 2126−158 has a blue power-law shape for longer wavelengths compared to V bands where the Lyα line falls. The flux drops off at shorter wavelengths due to its absorption by the intervening gas of the Lyman α forest.

== Observations ==
PKS 2126−158 is the brightest quasar observed through X-rays at redshift of z > 3 and second brightest object, after PKS 2149-306 located at z > 2. For this reason, PKS 2126−158 has been observed in greater details at X-ray frequencies since the first Einstein detection, which researchers discovered there is a strong energy which was contributed by the photoelectric absorption along the path, in addition to the Galactic 21 cm column density of 4.85 × 1020 cm^{−2} observed by Elvis et al. (1989).

Through spectral analysis observation from the EXOSAT database, PKS 2126−158 is found to be flat spectrum source (α = 0.3+/-0.15) given its power law and fixed absorption model fits within its spectrum. In this database, the soft (0.1-2 keV) and hard (2-10 keV) X- ray luminosities of this quasar are found to be (0.7 +/- 0.1)10^48^ erg s^-1^ and (2.3+/-0.3)10^48^ erg s^-1^ respectively. Although, there is no soft excess and low energy absorption have been detected, the thermal bremsstrahlung model is found to fit with the spectrum of PKS 2126 - 158, with a rest-frame temperature of 6.4_-4_^+40^ keV. This makes it the most luminous quasar detected in (30 keV) hard X-rays.

A more detailed observation conducted by BeppoSAX during May 28 to May 29, 1999, found, compared to previous observations by ROSAT and ASCA, the 2-10 keV and 0.1-2.5 keV fluxes were twice the factor higher. Moreover, it is also 40% higher compared to two recent observations by Chandra X-ray Observatory and XMM-Newton. As compared to the causal timescale associated with an emission region of ~10 Schwarzschild radii around few black holes, the shortest detected rest frame variability timescale is few months. Apart from it, the source that is detected, contains signal to noise ratio right up to ~50 keV and 215 keV rest frame.

These observations confirms the presence of a low energy absorption unrelated from the continuum model adopted, at a high confidence level. Despite its limited spectral resolution done by the BeppoSAX low energy concentrator system (LECS) and the medium energy concentrator system (MECS), it is quite possible to put constraints on different absorption and continuum models. For the absorber however, it is not easy to estimated its redshift. Furthermore, strong and complex metal line systems aligned with PKS 2126−158 were found at z = 0.6631 and at 2.64 < z < 2.82. This could be associated with the X-ray absorption.

Further observations of PKS 2126−158 according to researchers, have found the presence of 113 absorption lines in its spectrum, between the wavelength range from 4153 and 6807 A. Two sets of absorption redshift systems consisting of 14 lines at z = 2.6381 and 16 lines at z = 2.7685 are established, together with a possible four line system at z = 2.3938. As for the ions in the z = 2.7685 system, a column density is conducted, suggesting the absence of a 1533-A excited fine-structure line of Si II (J = 3/2) but the presence of 1335-A excited fine-structure line of C II (J = 3/2). An inspected examination of many unidentified lines shortward of L-alpha emission, finds that no more than three L-alpha and beta pairs are seen in the spectrum. From the cross-correlation analysis indicates there single L-alpha lines makes up 90% of the unidentified lines.

== Black hole ==
The supermassive black hole in PKS 2126−158 has an estimated mass of 10 billion solar masses, which researchers found out through using the bolometric light technique. This makes PKS 2126−158 to have one of the most massive black holes.

== Galaxy companions ==
Through measuring redshifts of different galaxies from Gemini South in multi-object spectroscopy mode around PKS 2126−158, five confirmed members from group of galaxies are found at z~ 0.66, similar velocities to metal-line absorption system seen in the quasar's spectrum. Four more fainter galaxies can be seen nearby and possibly associated with the group. There are a further three galaxies are close in redshift but have larger separations. While not related to the group, they are certainly part of the same large-scale structure.
