= Abell 402 BCG =

Brightest cluster galaxy in the constellation Eridanus

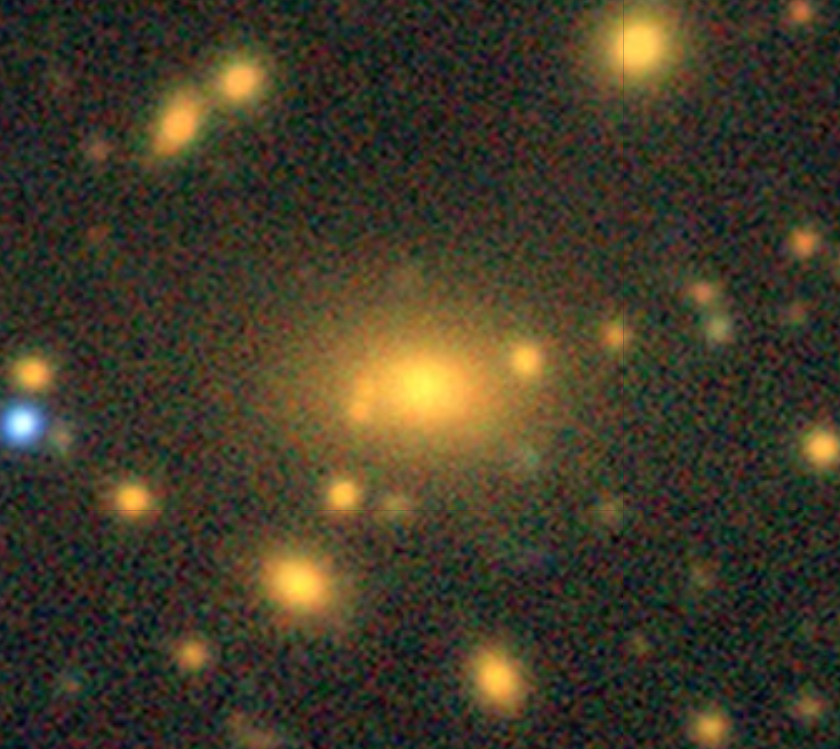
- DESI Legacy Surveys image of Abell 402 BCG

Observation data (J2000.0 epoch)
- Constellation: Eridanus
- Right ascension: 02^{h} 57^{m} 41.06^{s}
- Declination: −22° 09′ 17.76″
- Redshift: 0.306100
- Heliocentric radial velocity: 91,766 ± 5783 km/s
- Distance: 4,411.3 ± 500.1 Mly (1,352.51 ± 153.34 Mpc)
- Group or cluster: Abell 402
- Magnitude (J): 15.06

Characteristics
- Type: BrClG
- Size: ~706,000 ly (216.4 kpc) (estimated)

Other designations
- 2MASX J02574108−2209179, APMUKS(BJ) B025526.38−222116.2, 2CXO J025741.0−220918, MACS J0257.6−2209 BCG, LEDA 3648368

Abell 402 BCG (Short for Abell 402 Brightest Cluster Galaxy) is a massive elliptical galaxy residing in the center as the brightest cluster galaxy of the galaxy cluster, Abell 402 also known as MACS J0257.6-2209. The redshift of the galaxy is estimated to be (z) 0.306 and it is located in the constellation of Eridanus.

== Description ==
Abell 402 BCG is the central galaxy of Abell 402. There is a bright point-like source with a wavelength dependence that has characteristics of a typical active galactic nucleus (AGN). A dark region is also found east of the source, thought to be a region of dust that is located near the BCG's center. A large diffused core is present, suggesting it hosts an ultramassive black hole whose mass is estimated to be 10^{10} M_{☉}. The total stellar mass of the BCG is estimated to be 0.74 × 10^{12} M_{☉}.

The cavity region of the BCG has two sets of emission lines that are kinematically distinctive to each other and separated by 370 kilometers per second along the line of sight. There also other emission lines rich in h-alpha, h-beta and doubly ionized oxygen elements, however the emission lines are categorized as narrow, suggesting no broad-line AGN lies in the BCG. The components are also offset, with the redshifted source displaying doubly ionized oxygen emission without detections of singly ionized nitrogen, whereas the blueshifted source shows more of a LINER-type emission-line ratios. Further evidence also suggests the cavity region may also contain a binary pair of supermassive black holes, making them the largest pair ever found, with a combined binary mass of 6 ± 2 × 10^{10} M_{☉} suggesting a recent galaxy merger.

A study found faint traces of radio emission centering on the BCG with the presence of discrete sources that are possibly associated with other cluster galaxies. The BCG also has an X-ray peak offset of 28 kiloparsecs.
