= Markarian 335 =

Seyfert galaxy in the constellation of Pegasus

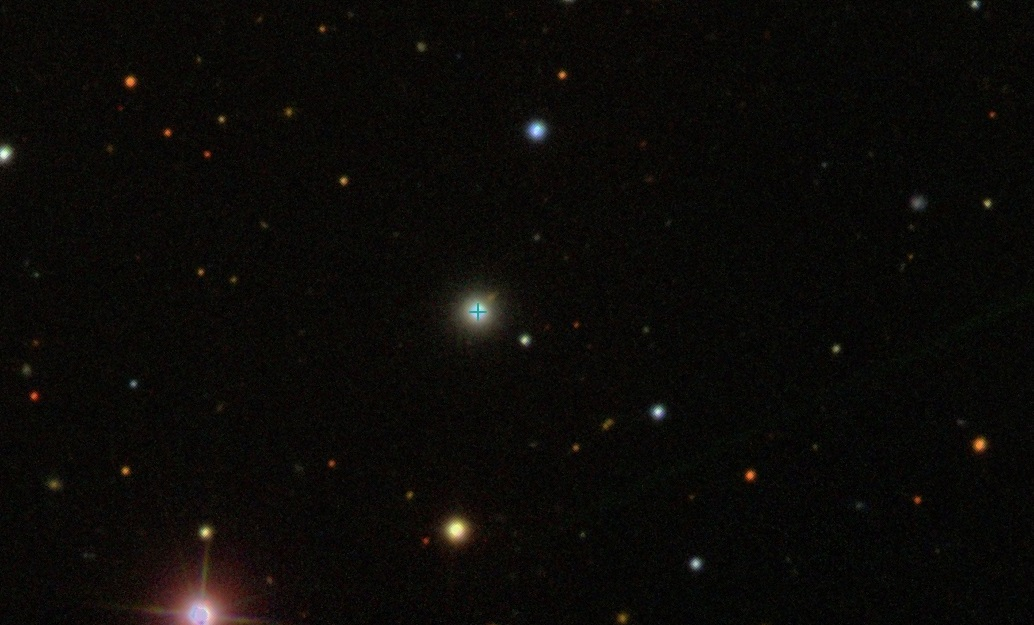

Observation data (J2000 epoch)
- Constellation: Pegasus
- Right ascension: 00^{h} 06^{m} 19.582^{s}
- Declination: +20° 12′ 10.58″
- Redshift: 7730 km/s
- Heliocentric radial velocity: 0.025785
- Distance: 490.21 ± 217.40 Mly (150.300 ± 66.654 Mpc)
- Apparent magnitude (V): 13.85
- Apparent magnitude (B): 14.19

Characteristics
- Type: E
- Apparent size (V): 0.187′

Other designations
- INTREF 2, 2MASS J00061953+2012105, PGC 473

Markarian 335, also known as the Moving Nebula, is an elliptical galaxy, located 324 million light-years away in the constellation of Pegasus.

Markarian 335 is a Seyfert galaxy containing a supermassive black hole. The central black hole in this active galaxy nucleus is notable for its corona's spinning rate (at about 20 percent the speed of light) and its change in brightness from 2007 to 2014. The geometry of the corona has been deduced from relativistic blurring of the reflection of the accretion disc. An X-ray flare in 2013 is interpreted as an aborted jet.

== Gallery ==
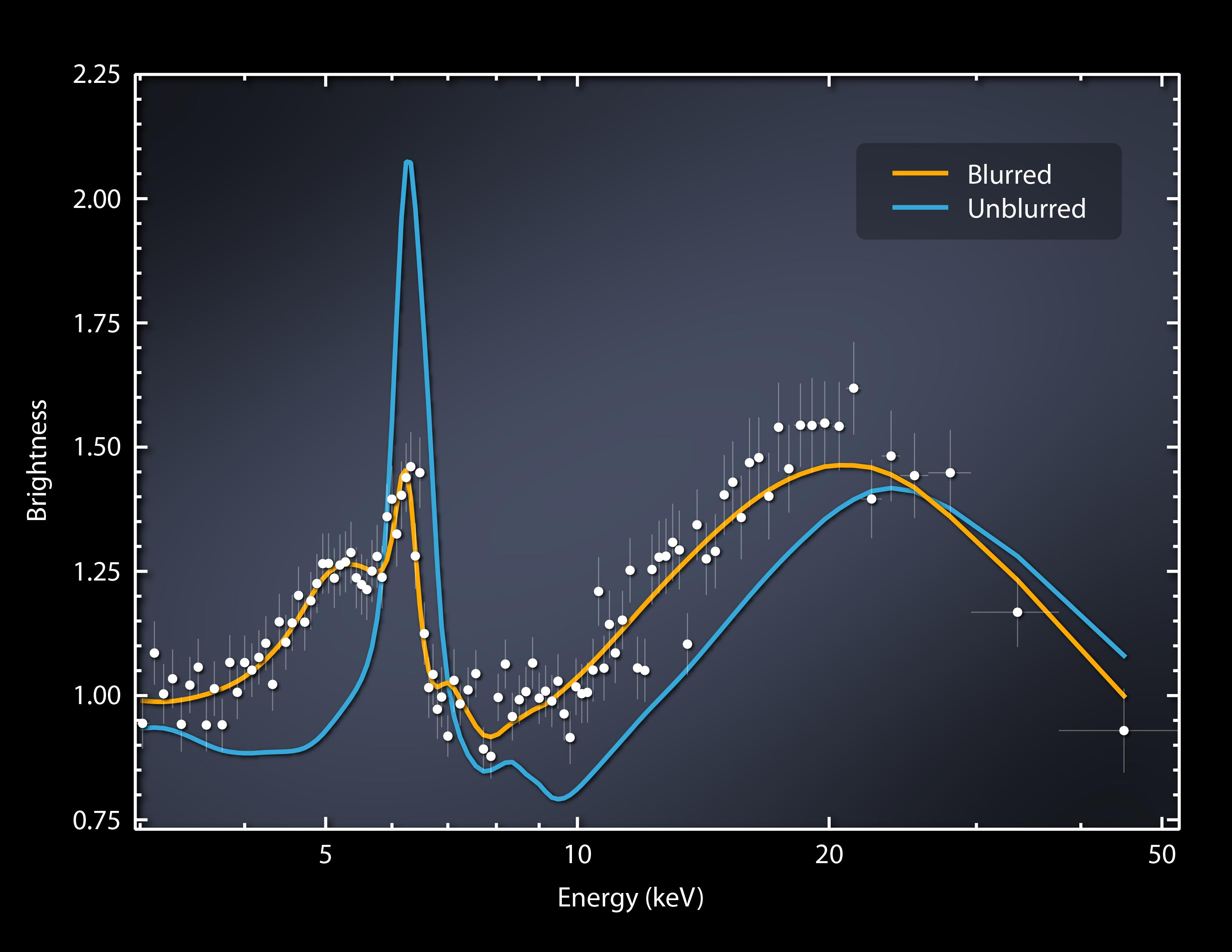
Graph showing the intensity vs. the energy (in keV) of X-rays coming from Markarian 335.
