= PG 1411+442 =

Seyfert 1 galaxy located in the constellation Boötes

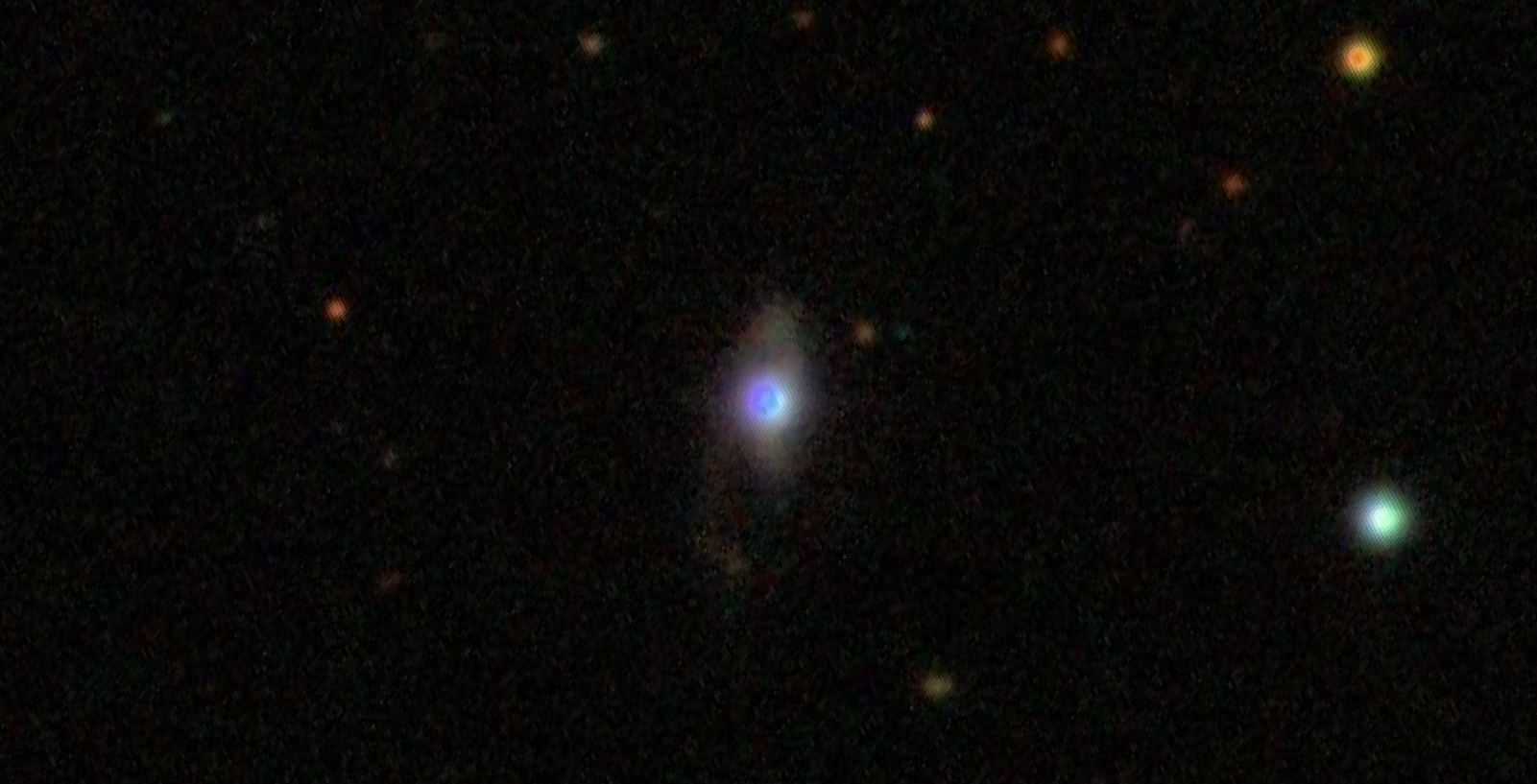
- SDSS image of PG 1411+442.

Observation data (J2000.0 epoch)
- Constellation: Boötes
- Right ascension: 14^{h} 13^{m} 48.31^{s}
- Declination: +44° 00′ 14.06″
- Redshift: 0.089600
- Heliocentric radial velocity: 26,861 km/s
- Distance: 1.244 Gly
- Apparent magnitude (V): 14.99

Characteristics
- Type: Sy 1.0
- Size: 55.06 kiloparsecs (179,600 light-years) (diameter; 2MASS K-band total isophote)

Other designations
- 2MASSI J1413483+440014, CSO 423, PGC 50824, PB 1732, FBS 335, SDSS J141348.33+440013.9, FBS 1411+442, UVQS J141348.33+440014.1

PG 1411+442 is a Seyfert type 1 galaxy located in the constellation of Boötes. The redshift for this object is (z) 0.089 and it was first discovered as a faint blue stellar object during the Palomar-Berger Blue Star Survey in 1976, before being identified as a quasar by follow-up spectroscopic observations. Because the object displays broad absorption lines at a low redshift, it is confirmed as the nearest broad absorption-line quasar (BAL).

== Description ==
PG 1411+442 is classified as X-ray weak radio-quiet quasar. The host galaxy is an inclined spiral galaxy in stages of an early galaxy merger based on optical imaging. Its structure is found to be distorted, with a tidal loop feature being elongated by 88 kiloparsecs towards north, then subsequently wrapping around in east direction. An outer extended spiral arm can be seen towards the south direction from the host, suggestive of a tidal tail caused by the merger product. Observations showed the galaxy has a linear feature emerging straight out from its nucleus before merging with the outer arm. There is a companion galaxy located 3.6 kiloparsecs away with an elongated appearance.

The radio source of PG 1411+442 is found heavily unresolved with an undetected blue jet curving towards the nucleus. There is a weak signal located on the galaxy's spiral structure as well as its outer arm. Evidence also pointed out the signal is well resolved in both the inner arms and the nuclear region. The arms are found to display a smooth curvature, but however they have a clumpy appearance suggesting the evidence of reddening.

In the spectrum of the galaxy, lies many rich broad absorption lines made of various chemical elements including helium, calcium and sodium. When studied, these lines are however weaker compared to the strong absorption lines found in NGC 4151 and Markarian 231. This indicates the absorbing clouds are either extremely ionized or have lower densities. It is also found PG 1411+442 is marginally variable with an amplitude of only 0.1-0.3 magnitude on a short time scale of one year. However, it is noted to have hydrogen Balmer absorption lines shown varying significantly, suggesting photoionization is playing a role for causing these line changes.

The central supermassive black hole mass of PG 1411+442 is estimated to be 3.5 ± 1.2 × 10^{8} M_{☉} based on studies conducted on active galactic nuclei by Misty Benz and Sarah Katz in 2015. In 2025, it was found to undergo a quasi-periodic oscillation with a duration of 550 days. This might be suggested by a candidate binary black hole system lying in the center of the galaxy.
