= PG 0052+251 =

Seyfert galaxy located in the constellation of Pisces

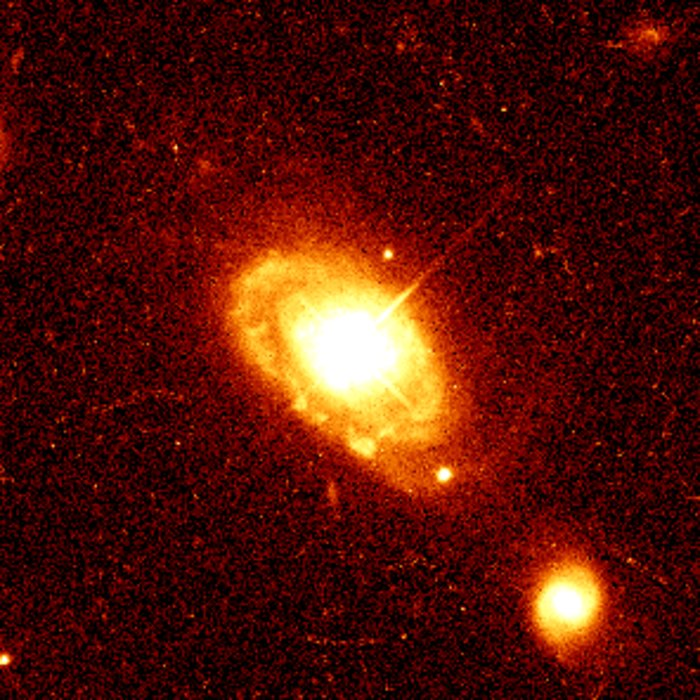
- HST image of PG 0052+251. The spiral host galaxy can be clearly seen.

Observation data (J2000.0 epoch)
- Constellation: Pisces
- Right ascension: 00^{h} 54^{m} 52.12^{s}
- Declination: +25° 25′ 39.02″
- Redshift: 0.154450
- Heliocentric radial velocity: 46,303 km/s
- Distance: 2.002 Gly
- Apparent magnitude (V): 15.42

Characteristics
- Type: Sb Sy1?

Other designations
- 2MASS J00545212+2525391, RBS 0130, PGC 3237, RX J0054.8+2525, 2E 0217, SDSS J005452.11+252539.0, 2XMM J005452.0+252539, LAMOST J005452.09+252539.1, 1H 0048+250

PG 0052+251 is a Seyfert type 1 galaxy located in the constellation of Pisces. Its redshift is (z) 0.154 estimating it to be two billion light-years away from Earth and was first discovered in 1982 by astronomers who also classified it as a quasar albeit with low luminosity. The host galaxy is particularly interesting because unlike other quasar host galaxies which are mainly ellipticals, this object is hosted by a spiral galaxy. It is also radio-quiet.

== Description ==
PG 0052+251 is classified as a normal barred spiral galaxy (type Sb) based on Hubble Space Telescope imaging, with several galaxy companions within its position indicating the galaxy is located in a compact group. It is shown to have two spiral arms located both east and west from its nucleus with multiple bright H II regions located within them. One of the arms appear to be more extended, ending in the spot where a companion object is located. There is a bright nuclear component. As a whole, the galaxy's appearance is undisturbed showing no evidence of a recent tidal event although it is facing a secondary wave of star-formation.

The surface brightness for this galaxy is 23 magnitude arcseconds^{−2} with its de Vaucouleurs profile described as falling rapidly when compared to its measured profile. The major axis is estimated to be 32 kiloparsecs with its minor axis of 21 kiloparsecs. Additionally, its spheroid magnitude is 19.2 ± 0.3, making it somewhere fainter by 3.1 magnitudes comparing with its disk. The radio structure of the source can be described as having a flat radio spectrum with some extended structure in the direction of south from its nucleus. Observations with Very Long Baseline Array in 2025, revealed a single component at both frequencies with a flat slope between 5 and 45 GHz suggesting the radio emission is optically thick.

PG 0052+251 contains a broad-line region. According to observations, the region is found to be described as a spherical shell with its depth being 600 light-days, an inner radius of 90 light-days and its outer layer being around 700 light-days long. Evidence also showed there is an inner broad component and an intermediate broad component described as being obscured within the region based on its line core properties. The black hole of PG 0052+251 is estimated to be 3.69 ± 0.76 × 10^{8} M_{☉} according to a study by B.M. Peterson. Variations are noted in its emission lines at 8% and 7% in continuum over a measured time period of 69 days long.

The galaxy is categorized as a type 1 quasar. It has a narrow-line region in additional to its broad-line region described as extended. Studies of its structure showed it has a radial extent of 0.5 kiloparsecs with a measured luminosity of 3.8 × 10^{42} erg s^{−1}. There are three blob-like structures in the eastern region which in turn, are embedded inside a low-surface brightness region. One of the blobs is located 4.3 kiloparsecs away from its active nucleus.
