= 3C 109 =

Seyfert galaxy located in the constellation Taurus

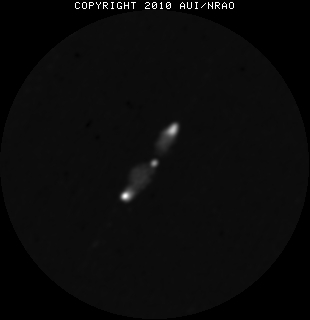

Observation data (J2000 epoch)
- Constellation: Taurus
- Right ascension: 04^{h} 13^{m} 40.20^{s}
- Declination: +11° 12′ 22.0″
- Redshift: 0.306
- Apparent magnitude (V): 18.0

Characteristics
- Type: E

Other designations
- LEDA 2817533, 4C 11.18, PKS 0410+11

3C 109 is a Seyfert galaxy located in the constellation Taurus. It is also a broad-line radio galaxy, classified as one of the most active polarized galaxies apart from blazars with quasar-like properties. The black hole in 3C 109 is said to have an estimated mass of 9.3 × 10^{8} M_{☉}.

== See also ==
- Lists of galaxies
