= 3C 454.3 =

Blazar and strong gamma ray source

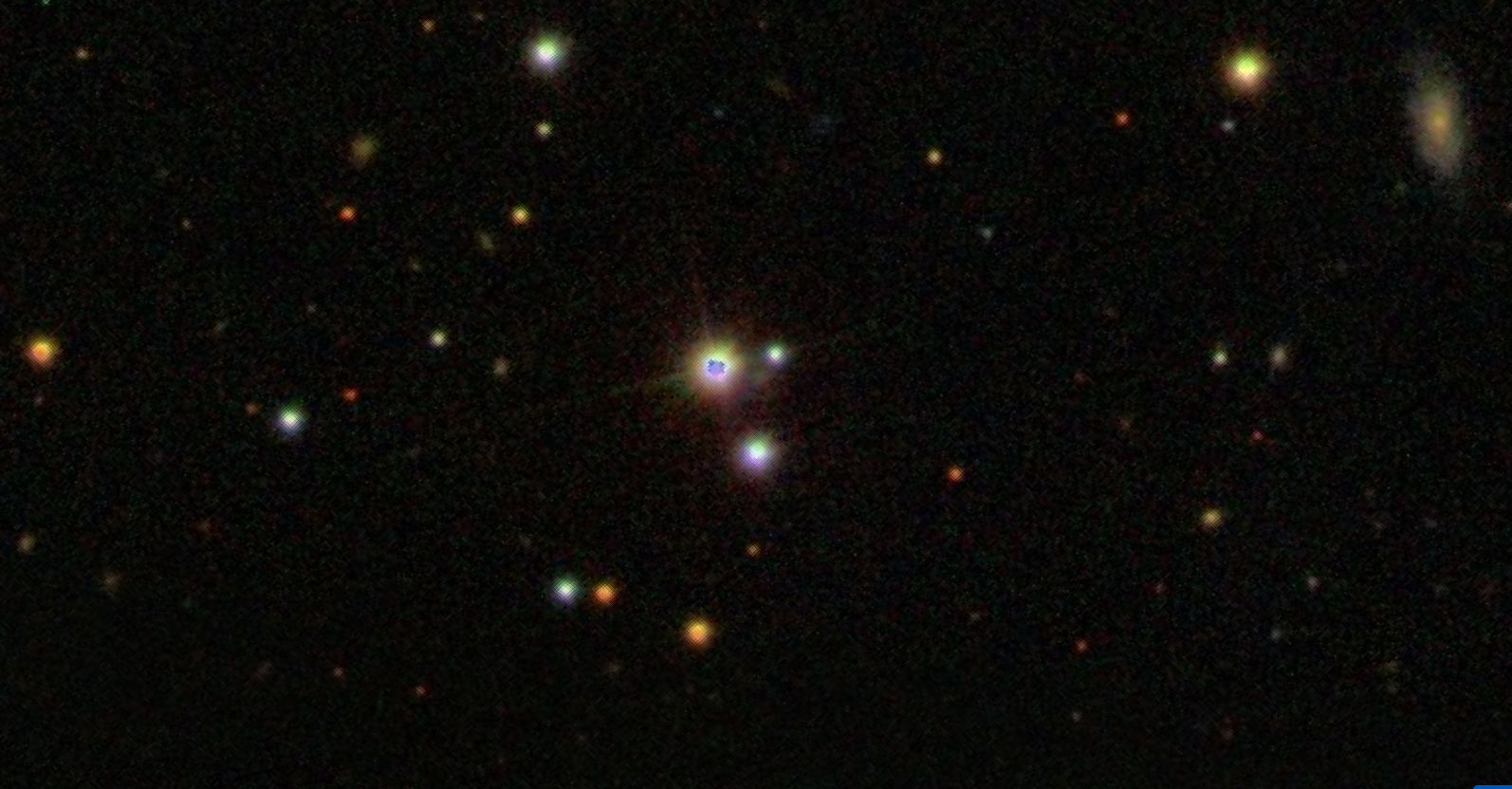
- SDSS image of 3C 454.3

Observation data (Epoch J2000)
- Constellation: Pegasus
- Right ascension: 22^{h} 53^{m} 57.7^{s}
- Declination: +16° 08′ 53.6″
- Redshift: 0.859001 ± 0.000170
- Distance: 7.7 Gly
- Type: Blazar/Quasar
- Apparent magnitude (V): 16.1

3C 454.3 is a blazar (a type of quasar with a jet oriented toward Earth) located away from the galactic plane. It is one of the brightest gamma ray sources in the sky, and is one of the most luminous astronomical objects ever observed, with a maximum absolute magnitude of -31.4. It has the brightest blazar gamma ray flare recorded, twice as bright as the Vela Pulsar in the Milky Way galaxy. It also flares at radio and visible wavelengths – in red light, the blazar brightened by more than 2.5 times to magnitude 13.7 – and it is very bright at high radio frequencies.

It appears in Pegasus, near Alpha Pegasi (Markab). It has been known to occasionally outburst, brightening to a peak apparent magnitude of 13.4 in June 2014.

It is possible that a binary supermassive black hole might lie in the center of 3C 454.3 based on observations. Additionally, it has a bright radio core and radio jet described as one-sided, with its jet components moving in superluminal motion. An arc-structure has also been detected on parsec-scales around the region of its core.

== History ==
In July and August 2007, 3C 454.3 flared to near-historic levels, only two years after its record-breaking 2005 optical flare. Luckily, Spitzer Space Telescope and Chandra X-ray Observatory were already scheduled for simultaneous observations. Swift, RXTE and the new gamma-ray AGILE spacecraft responded to this target of opportunity, and were joined by observatories around the world.

The Fermi Large Area Telescope AGN science group started a multiwavelength campaign for blazar 3C454.3 (2251+158), in July and continuing through August 2007. This Ad Hoc Intensive Campaign (AIC) was prompted by brightening in the radio, optical and X-ray.
