= PG 0026+129 =

Seyfert 1 galaxy in the constellation Pisces

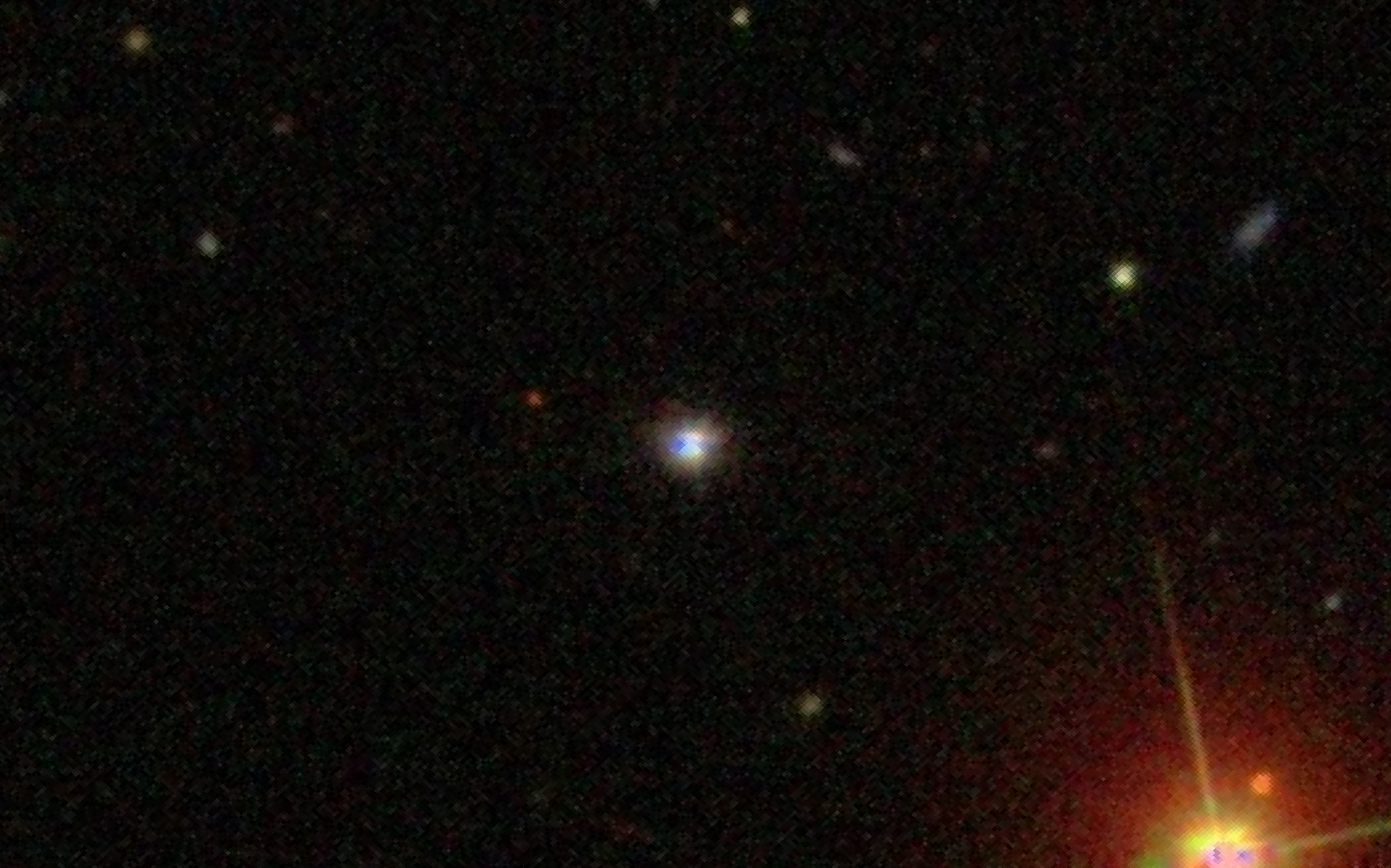
- SDSS image of PG 0026+129.

Observation data (J2000.0 epoch)
- Constellation: Pisces
- Right ascension: 00^{h} 29^{m} 13.70^{s}
- Declination: +13° 16′ 03.93″
- Redshift: 0.142000
- Heliocentric radial velocity: 42,571 km/s
- Distance: 1.845 Gly
- Apparent magnitude (V): 15.41

Characteristics
- Type: RQQ Sy1

Other designations
- 2MASSI J0029136+131603, PGC 1790, RBS 0068, 2E 0093, SDSS J002913.70+131603.9

PG 0026+129 is a Seyfert 1 galaxy and a radio-quiet quasar located in the constellation of Pisces. The redshift for this object is (z) 0.142 and it was first discovered by R.F. Green in 1976 during a spectroscopic examination alongside three other quasars.

== Description ==
PG 0026+129 displays a rich system of emission-lines in its spectrum. However, the spectrum is very unusual since there is evidence of strong emission originating from its doubly ionized iron multiplets at 4570, 5190 and 5320 Å. In addition, the ultraviolet spectrum of the object is described as having a broad hump.

The host galaxy of PG 0026+129 is an elliptical galaxy with a smooth appearance based on high-resolution studies. The appearance of the galaxy is undisturbed but elongated slightly from east to west direction with no signs of an apparent structure. The host galaxy has star-forming regions with the stellar mass of the stars in the H-band estimated to be 10.9 M_{☉} and a total star formation rate of 16^{+6}_{-8} M_{☉} per year based on its Hβ and Paα luminosity.

The radio source of PG 0026+129 is described as compact and extended based on Very Large Array observations, with half of its radio flux being contained within 2.5 arcsecond region. However its flat-spectrum radio core remains unresolved. B-Array imaging found the source has an elongation north to south. A nuclear component has been found with an extension of two arcseconds towards the south.

PG 0026+129 is found to have two distinctive broad-line regions. Based on studies, it shows a broad Hβ line profile composed of one intermediate-width and one very broad component with full width at half maximum velocities of 1,964 ± 18 and 7,570 ± 83 kilometer per seconds. There is also evidence of velocity-resolved delays with time lags of 30 to 50 days at the Hβ line core with no signs of time lags in its wings. A supermassive black hole mass of (3.93 ± 0.96) × 10^{6} M_{☉} has been calculated for the object based on its Paschen hydrogen emission line width and its continuum luminosity. The narrow-line region of PG 0026+129 is estimated to have a radius of 2,281 ± 40 parsecs with a surface brightness of 1.47 10^{−17} erg s^{−1} towards the edge of the region.
