= IC 4329A =

Galaxy in the constellation of centaurus

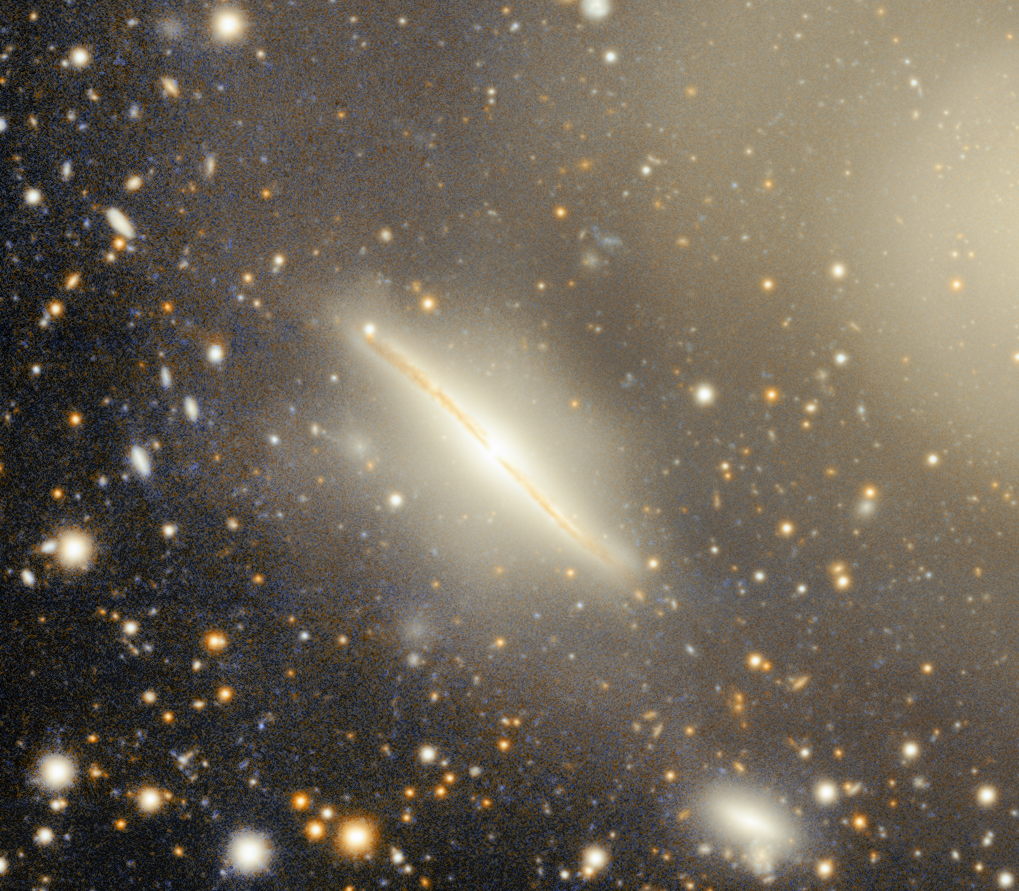
- IC 4329A imaged by the Dark Energy Camera on the Víctor M. Blanco Telescope

Observation data (J2000 epoch)
- Constellation: Centaurus
- Right ascension: 13^{h} 49^{m} 19^{s}
- Declination: −30° 18′ 34.21″
- Redshift: 0.015207
- Heliocentric radial velocity: 4,515 kilometres per second
- Distance: 63.39±0.23 megaparsec
- Apparent magnitude (V): 11.5

Characteristics
- Type: GX [S0-a]
- Notable features: Seyfert galaxy

Other designations
- PGC 49051, ESO 445-50, IRAS 13464-3003, IRAS F13464-3003, 2MASX J13491927-3018338, ESO-LV 445-0500, MCG-05-33-021, 1ES 1346-30.0, 1RXS J134919.0-301830, 6dFGS gJ134919.3-301834, NVSS J134919-301833, PSCz P13464-3003, RBS 1319, SGC 134628-3003.7, LEDA 49051, 2A 1347-300, 3A 1346-301, INTREF 579, XSS J13492-3020, [DML87] 679, [HB91] 1346-300, FLASH J134919.31-301833.1, PBC J1349.2-3018, MAXI J1349-302, 2MAXI J1349-302 and Gaia DR2 6175160320123081600

IC 4329A, also commonly referred as PGC 49051 is a Seyfert galaxy in the constellation of Centaurus. Its distance from Earth is 206 million light years. The declination of IC 4329A is approximately -30.2 degrees and was first discovered by Wilson A. S. & Penston, M. V. in 1979.

== Characteristics ==
This galaxy was first described by using an X-ray spectro-polarimetric analysis as an extremely bright Seyfert galaxy on account of the width of H-alpha (13,000 km/sec) and the high H-beta luminosity. This galaxy is described as an edge-on spiral galaxy close to the elliptical galaxy IC 4329, which is the brightest galaxy inside a galaxy cluster in the Centaurus region. It has a dust lane displaying extreme polarization.

Additionally, dust components in IC 4329A have been detected mainly in the interstellar medium of its host galaxy as well as its nuclear component located in the active torus.

The supermassive black hole in IC 4329A is estimated to be 6.8^{+1.2}_{−1.1} × 10^{7} M_{☉}.

== Ultraviolet Imaging with AstroSat/UVIT ==
In 2017, the region around IC 4329A was observed using the Ultra-Violet Imaging Telescope (UVIT) aboard AstroSat. The observations, taken in near-ultraviolet (NUV) and far-ultraviolet (FUV) bands, revealed 4,437 sources in NUV and 456 in FUV.

== Nearby galaxies ==
The closest galaxy next to IC 4329A is IC 4329 with the group of IC 4327, 5302, 5304, 5298, PGC 159482 and PGC 48950.
