= H1821+643 =

Quasar in the constellation Draco

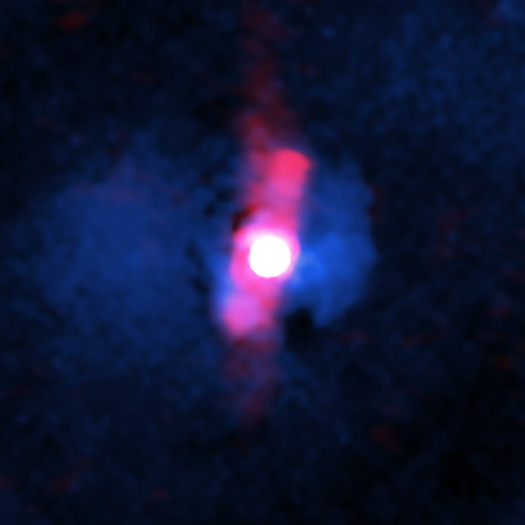
- Chandra X-ray Observatory image of H1821+643

Observation data (Epoch J2000.0)
- Constellation: Draco
- Right ascension: 18^{h} 21^{m} 57.2365^{s}
- Declination: +64° 20′ 36.226″
- Redshift: 0.2970
- Distance: 3.4 gigalight-years (1.0 Gpc)
- Type: Quasar
- Apparent magnitude (V): 14.24

H1821+643 is an extraordinarily luminous, radio-quiet quasar in the constellation of Draco. The associated Active Galactic Nucleus (AGN) is situated in the Brightest Central Galaxy (BCG) of a massive ($\sim 6.3 \times 10^{14} M_\odot$), strong cooling flow cluster, CL 1821+64. Russel et al. (2010) spatially isolated its X-ray signal from the surrounding cluster in Chandra X-ray observatory observations and computed $L_\odot = 10^{47} erg/s$ from the observed X-ray luminosity.

== Supermassive black hole ==
The SMBH centred in CL 1821+64 is believed to be among the most massive in the known Universe. A variety of techniques have found different values for the mass. 5 studies found values $M_{BH} \sim 10^9 M_\odot$. Kim et al. (2004) and Floyd et al. (2008) used galactic bulge luminosity fits derived from Hubble data to find $10^9 M_\odot$ and $3 \times 10^9 M_\odot$ respectively. Russell et al. (2010) provided a rough estimate of $M_{BH} \sim 3 \times 10^9$M_{☉}. This was an underestimate with $\log(\Delta M_{BH}/M_\odot) \geq 1$. Kolman et al. (1991) and Shapovalova (2016) independently modelled the quasar UV spectrum to find $M_{BH} \sim 3 \times 10^9 M_\odot$. Capellupo et al. (2017) found $M_{BH} \sim 3 \times 10^9$ using $H\beta$ line emissions. 2 independent X-ray studies found significantly higher values. Reynolds et al. (2014) found $6\times10^9 M_\odot$ by modelling reflection from the accretion disc and Walker et al. found $3\times10^{10} M_\odot$ by modelling the interaction of the black hole with the Intracluster medium (ICM) as a Compton-cooled feeding cycle. $M_{BH}$ is in the range $\log(M_{BH}/M_\odot) \sim 9.2 - 10.5$.

The Schwarzschild diameter of this black hole is between 9.4 terametres (63 AU) and 188 terametres (1,260 AU), which is about 16 times the diameter of Pluto's orbit. If the hole were a Euclidean sphere, the average density would be 18 g/m^{3}, $\sim 1 \%$ the density of air at sea level on Earth. (Note: Mass 3.0×10^{10} * 2.0×10^{30}=6.0×10^{40} kg. Volume at radius 8.6×10^{13} m is 2.66×10^{42} m^{3}.)
