= OJ 287 =

BL Lac object in the constellation Cancer

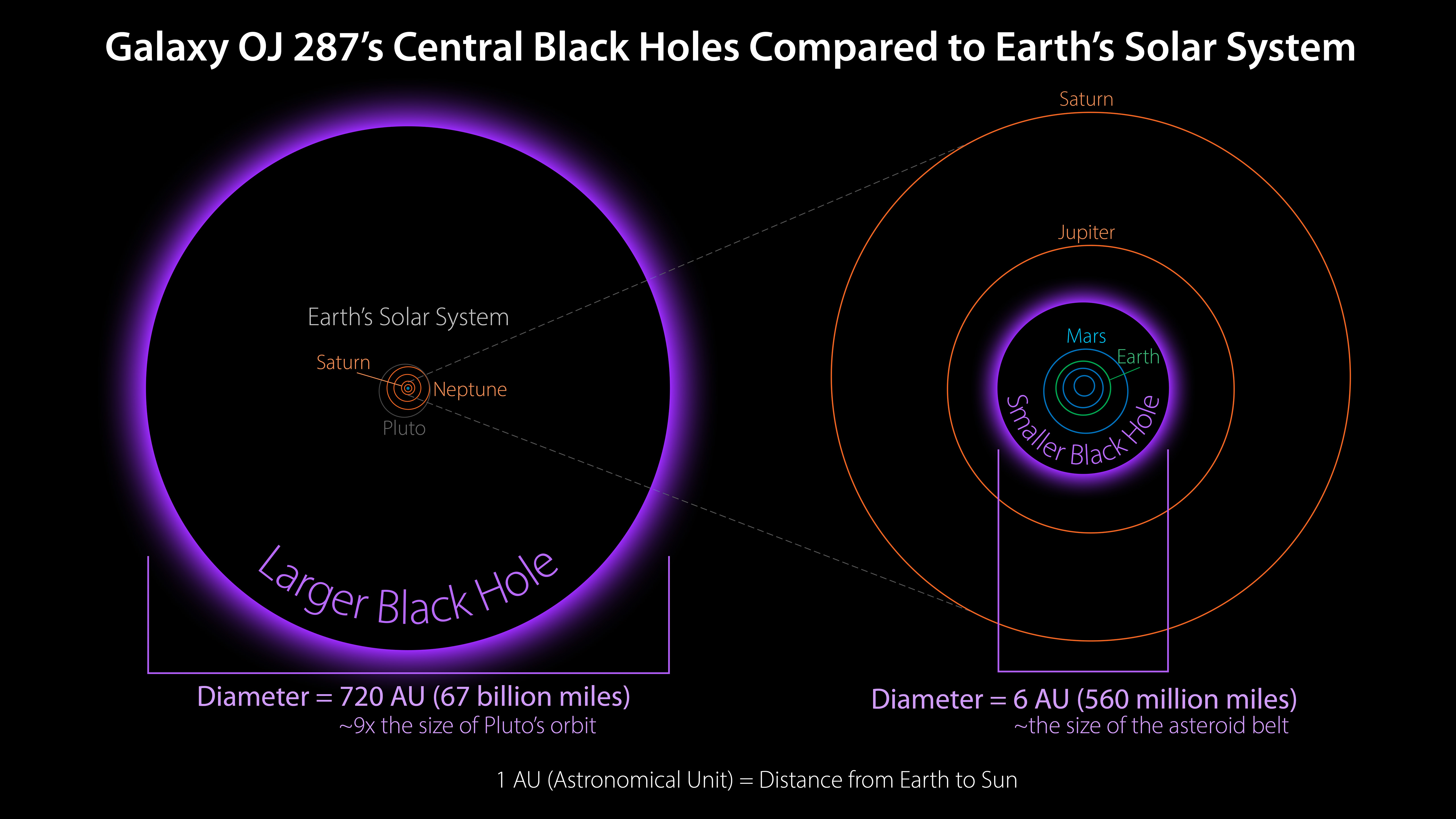
- Comparisons of large and small black holes in galaxy OJ 287 to the Solar System

Observation data (Epoch J2000)
- Constellation: Cancer
- Right ascension: 08^{h} 54^{m} 48.9^{s}
- Declination: +20° 06′ 31″
- Redshift: 0.306000
- Distance: 4 Gly (1.226 Gpc)
- Type: BL Lac
- Apparent magnitude (V): 15.43

Other designations
- EGO 0851+202, 3EG J0853+1941, RGB J0854+201

OJ 287 is a BL Lacertae object 4 billion light-years from Earth that has produced quasi-periodic optical outbursts going back approximately 120 years, as first apparent on photographic plates from 1891. Seen on photographic plates since at least 1887, it was first detected at radio wavelengths during the course of the Ohio Sky Survey. It is a supermassive black hole binary (SMBHB). The intrinsic brightness of the flashes corresponds to over a trillion times the Sun's luminosity, greater than the entire Milky Way galaxy's light output.

== Characteristics ==
Given the variability in the SMBHB's bursts and properties, multiple models have been proposed to account for these flashes. Analysis of a light curve spanning 130 years give a mass for the central black hole to be 18,350,000,000 M_{☉}.

Event Horizon Telescope observations at 1.3 mm in April 2017 revealed changes in the structure and polarization of the inner jet over five days.

Black Hole Disk Flares In Galaxy OJ 287 (1:22; animation; 28 April 2020)

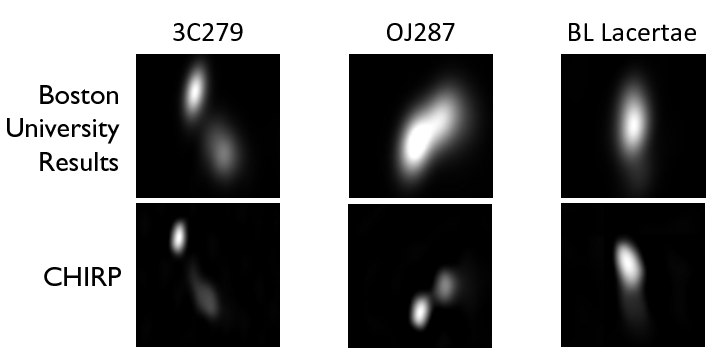
Interferometric observations of OJ287 by the VLBA resolved with the CHIRP algorithm and another algorithm by a group from Boston university.

The optical light curve shows that OJ 287 has a periodic variation of 11–12 years with a narrow double peak at maximum brightness. This kind of variation suggests that it is a binary supermassive black hole. The double-burst variability is thought to result from the smaller black hole punching through the accretion disc of the larger black hole twice in every 12 years.

The secondary black hole orbits the larger one with an observed orbital period of approximately 12 years and a calculated eccentricity of approximately 0.65. The maximum brightness is obtained when the minor component moves through the accretion disk of the supermassive component at perinigricon. The perinigricon and aponigricon of its orbit are about 3,250 and 17,500 AU. In recent models, the mass of the secondary supermassive black hole has been estimated to be approximately 150 million solar masses.

An independent Swift/XRT X-ray spectral analysis based on the bulk-motion Comptonization scaling method yielded a comparable estimate of about 2 × 10^8 solar masses for the secondary component of the binary, although the authors noted that this interpretation depends on the assumption that a significant fraction of the observed X-ray emission is produced by bulk-motion Comptonization rather than being jet-dominated.

An international collaboration led by Stefanie Komossa reported that a predicted major outburst of OJ 287 in October 2022 was not observed. This absence places constraints on specific binary supermassive black hole scenarios and on models that require extremely high primary black hole masses with precise orbital timing.

A 2026 study interpreted the October 2022 activity as a tidal flare supporting an ultramassive primary black hole.

In order to reproduce all the known outbursts, the rotation of the primary black hole is calculated to be 38% of the maximum allowed rotation for a Kerr black hole.

The companion's orbit is decaying via the emission of gravitational radiation and it is expected to merge with the central black hole within approximately 10,000 years.
