= Reverberation mapping =

Astrophysical technique

Animation of the principle behind reverberation mapping (or echo mapping). Light from the accretion disk around a supermassive black hole is scattered off the surrounding broad line region, causing a delayed echo at redder wavelengths.

Reverberation mapping (or Echo mapping) is an astrophysical technique for measuring the structure of the broad-line region (BLR) around a supermassive black hole at the center of an active galaxy, and thus estimating the hole's mass. It is considered a "primary" mass estimation technique, i.e., the mass is measured directly from the motion that its gravitational force induces in the nearby gas.

Newton's law of gravity defines a direct relation between the mass of a central object and the speed of a smaller object in orbit around the central mass. Thus, for matter orbiting a black hole, the black-hole mass $M_\bullet$ is related by the formula

$$GM_\bullet = f \, R_\text{BLR} \, (\Delta V)^2$$

to the RMS velocity ΔV of gas moving near the black hole in the broad emission-line region, measured from the Doppler broadening of the gaseous emission lines. In this formula, R_{BLR} is the radius of the broad-line region; G is the constant of gravitation; and f is a poorly known "form factor" that depends on the shape of the BLR.

While ΔV can be measured directly using spectroscopy, the necessary determination of R_{BLR} is much less straightforward. This is where reverberation mapping comes into play. It utilizes the fact that the emission-line fluxes vary strongly in response to changes in the continuum, i.e., the light from the accretion disk near the black hole. Put simply, if the brightness of the accretion disk varies, the emission lines, which are excited in response to the accretion disk's light, will "reverberate", that is, vary in response. But it will take some time for light from the accretion disk to reach the broad-line region. Thus, the emission-line response is delayed with respect to changes in the continuum. Assuming that this delay is solely due to light travel times, the distance traveled by the light, corresponding to the radius of the broad emission-line region, can be measured.

At least 70active galactic nuclei have been accurately mapped in this way. An alternative approach is to use an empirical correlation between R_{BLR} and the continuum luminosity.

Another uncertainty is the value of f. In principle, the response of the BLR to variations in the continuum could be used to map out the three-dimensional structure of the BLR. In practice, the amount and quality of data required to carry out such a deconvolution is prohibitive. Until about 2004, f was estimated ab initio based on simple models for the structure of the BLR. More recently, the value of f has been determined so as to bring the M–sigma relation for active galaxies into the best possible agreement with the M–sigma relation for quiescent galaxies. When f is determined in this way, reverberation mapping becomes a "secondary", rather than "primary", mass estimation technique.
