= S5 2007+777 =

BL Lacertae object in the constellation Draco

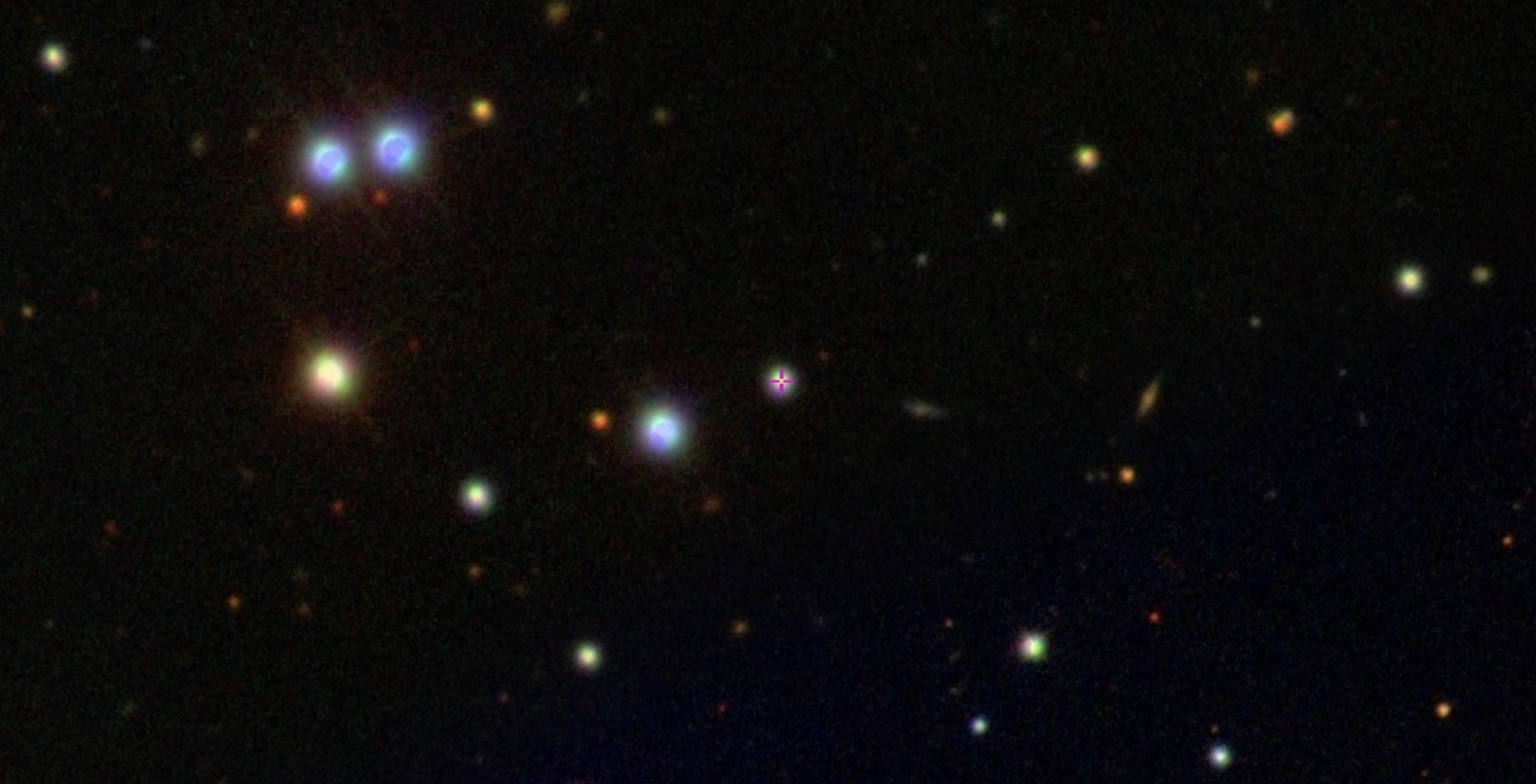
- The BL Lacertae object S5 2007+777.

Observation data (J2000.0 epoch)
- Constellation: Draco
- Right ascension: 20^{h} 05^{m} 30.998^{s}
- Declination: +77° 52′ 43.248″
- Redshift: 0.342000
- Heliocentric radial velocity: 102,529 km/s
- Distance: 3.662 Gly
- Apparent magnitude (V): 16.5

Characteristics
- Type: BL Lac
- Notable features: Core-dominated source, HYMORS, one of the four BL Lacertae objects displaying an extended kiloparsec-scale X-ray jet

Other designations
- S5 2007+77, NVSS J200531+775243, 6C 200718+774350, 4FGL J2005.5+7752, 2E 4325, WMAP J2005+7755, 1RXS J200529.2+775240

S5 2007+777 is a classical BL Lacertae object located in the constellation of Draco. This object has a redshift of (z) 0.342 and was first discovered in 1981 as a flat-spectrum radio quasar. It has characteristics of different Fanaroff-Riley classes on both sides of its active nucleus making it a rare type of Hybrid morphology radio sources (HYMORs). It has an estimated V magnitude of 16.5.

== Description ==
S5 2007+777 is classified as a blazar showing variability across the electromagnetic spectrum with amplitudes rising steadily along with frequency. It is also an Intraday Variable (IDV) source exhibiting variations as a whole as well as in polarized intensity on time scales ranging from 2 to 6 days at centimeter (cm) wavelengths. In dereddened B and I-band light curves during observations conducted in 2001, S5 2007+777 shows a smaller amplitude variation of 10%. Subsequent observations conducted in both 2002 and 2004, shows the object having minimum to maximum variations of order 30-40% on 2-4 day time scales.

Although mostly in a quiescent state, one outburst was detected in S5 2007+777 between 1991 and 1992 with the peak flux of this source reaching 3.69 Jansky at 14.5 GHz. A gamma ray flare was detected in February 2016 during an observation from the Foligno Observatory via a 30 cm telescope.

According to radio imaging of S5 2007+777 made by Very Long Baseline Array, a one-sided core-jet structure is found with one of the components exhibiting proper motion and greater flux density. Imaging by Very Large Array and Very Long Baseline Interferometry, shows the object as a core-dominated source instead, consisting of a bright radio lobe on the eastern side and a long jet on the western side of the nucleus which terminates without a clear hot spot upon reaching at 10 arcseconds from the nucleus. This jet is known to show superluminal motion, being aligned 24° to the line of sight with its 4.9 GHz luminosity calculated to be 10^{32} erg s^{−1} Hz^{−1}.

The radio emission of the jet in S5 2007+777 shows several unique radio knots with the brightest one located midstream. The jet itself imaged at 1.49 GHz, has an extended structure in linear direction which it bends west at a changed position angle of 20°. An extended X-ray jet was also found by Chandra on kiloparsec-scales, making S5 2007+777 only one of the four BL Lacertae objects to have this feature.
