= PKS 0454−234 =

Blazar in the constellation Lepus

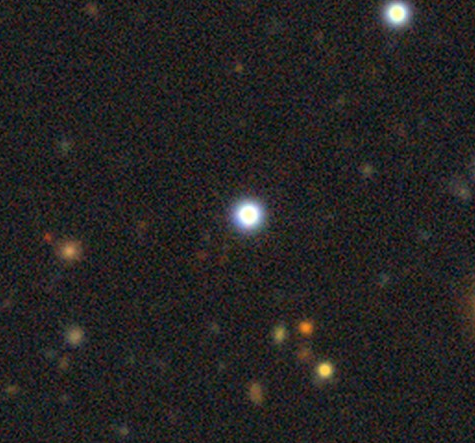
- The blazar PKS 0454−234

Observation data (J2000.0 epoch)
- Constellation: Lepus
- Right ascension: 04^{h} 57^{m} 03.179^{s}
- Declination: −23° 24′ 52.020″
- Redshift: 1.003000
- Heliocentric radial velocity: 300,692 km/s
- Distance: 7.531 Gly
- Apparent magnitude (V): 18.5
- Apparent magnitude (B): 18.85

Characteristics
- Type: HPQ, Blazar, BL Lac

Other designations
- OHIO F -292, 4FGL J0457.0PKS 0454-2342324, WMAP 128, QSO B0454-234, PKS J0457PKS 0454-2342324, NVSS J045703−232452

PKS 0454−234 is a blazar located in the constellation of Lepus. It is classified as a highly polarized quasar with a redshift of (z) 1.003. This object was first discovered in 1970 during a 1415 MHz continuum survey conducted by Ohio State University where it was given the designation, OF -292. The radio spectrum of this source is flat, making it a flat-spectrum radio quasar.

== Description ==
PKS 0454−234 is found to be variable on the electromagnetic spectrum. It is known to show powerful outbursts with a spectrum showing as inverted right up to 20 GHz, but becomes steeper upon reaching its quiescence state after 8 GHz. In additional, PKS 0454−234 exhibits extreme gamma ray activity observed by Large Area Telescope in January 2009 and by the AGILE satellite, where the activity reached above 100 MeV in August 2019. Flares were detected in near-infrared wavelengths in 2011 and 2013. An observation conducted by Japanese scientists in 2013, also found PKS 0454−234 has a soft spectrum with an estimated integral flux of 2.82 × 10^{−7} ± 1.10 × 10^{−9} in the ranges of 0.1-300 GeV.

Very Long Baseline Interferometry radio imaging taken at 5 GHz showed PKS 0454−234 having an asymmetric morphology, consisting of a strong radio core and compact jetlike component that is located in a northwest direction with a position angle of -62°. This core has a brightness temperature of around 6 × 10^{11} Kelvin. When imaged at 2.3 and 8.5 GHz, it shows the object mainly having a core-dominated structure and a weak jet extending out by 5 mas along the position angle of -130°. There is also a presence of a secondary structure located at a distance of 1 mas southeast with its secondary components having 90° position angle differences according to multiepoch monitoring done by United States Naval Observatory (USNO).

In 2022, PKS 0454−234 was found to show two quasi-periodic oscillation signals with duration periods of 3.51 ± 0.33 and 6.10 ± 0.82 years. This might be explained by a binary black hole model with estimated mass of 4.69 × 10^{8} M_{☉} and a gravitational wave emission having a decay time period of 9.56 × 10^{4} years.
