= BL Lac =

BL Lac may refer to:

- BL Lacertae, an active galaxy, prototype of the BL Lacertae objects
- BL Lacertae object, a type of active galaxy, based on the prototype BL Lacertae galaxy
