= PKS 1510−089 =

Blazar in the constellation Libra

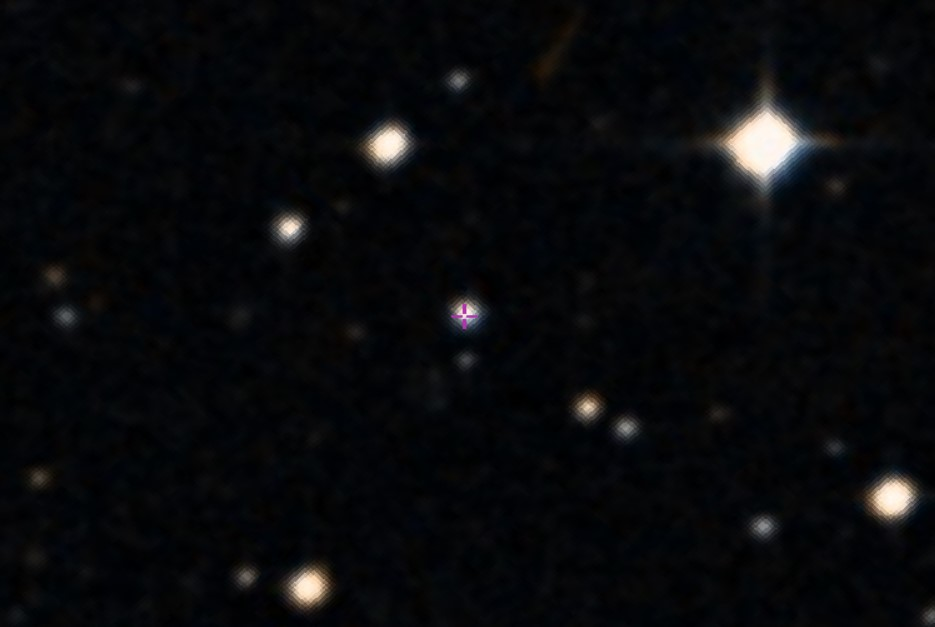
- The blazar PKS 1510−089

Observation data (J2000.0 epoch)
- Constellation: Libra
- Right ascension: 15^{h} 12^{m} 50.532^{s}
- Declination: −09° 05′ 59.830″
- Redshift: 0.360000
- Heliocentric radial velocity: 107,925 km/s
- Distance: 4.409 Gly
- Apparent magnitude (V): 16.54
- Apparent magnitude (B): 16.74

Characteristics
- Type: Opt var, Sy 1, HPQ
- Notable features: Optically variable blazar

Other designations
- LEDA 2828331, INTREF 638, QSO J1512−0906, 4FGL J1512.8−0906, WMAP 207, OHIO R -017, TXS 1510−089, 2E 3390, TIC 79275781, TeV J1512−091, PG 1510−08, PKS 1510−08

PKS 1510−089 is a blazar located in the constellation of Libra, categorized as a highly polarized quasar showing fast variations in polarization angles, with a redshift of (z) 0.361. It was first discovered in 1966 as an astronomical radio source during the Parkes Observatory survey in 1966. The radio spectrum of the source appears flat, thus making it a flat-spectrum radio quasar (FRSQ).

== Description ==
PKS 1510−089 is found to be violently variable on the electromagnetic spectrum according to scientists. It is known to show variations in all wavebands ranging from radio to gamma rays as well as varying in optical brightness. This makes it a key target of several observation campaigns and also by both MAGIC Florian Goebel Telescopes and High Energy Stereoscopic System (HESS). It also shows outbursts, which was detected in 1979, by astronomers via using a 46-meter telescope at the Algonquin Radio Observatory. During this period, the flux density in PKS 1510−089 drastically increased from a low value of 1.5 Jansky (Jy) in 1978 to 4.80 Jy by January 1979 making it the highest recorded flux density during the 12 year observation period.

In March 2009, PKS 1510−089 showed extreme gamma ray activity as observed by the AGILE satellite, which the emission originated, had an average flux of (311 ± 21) × 10^{−8} photons cm^{−2} s^{−1} above 100 MeV. This was then followed by a flaring episode detected in both ultraviolet and near-infrared wavebands. PKS 1510−089 was also observed by Fermi-LAT from August 2008 right up to May 2012, showing several flares when its daily 0.1-300 GeV gamma ray flux exceeded 10^{−5} photons cm^{−2} s^{−1}. A short but significant flare was observed in September 2013 although it wasn't high compared to 2009. Between its three quiescent states in 2015, it showed four flares

A powerful complex gamma ray flare was detected in PKS 1510−089 in July 2015. According to multi-frequency optical, radio and gamma ray light curves on the object conducted from 2013 to 2018 as well as analyzing jet kinematic and linear polarization via data from Very Long Baseline Array, a radio flare was discovered trailing the gamma ray flares. This radio flare was shown to have a thick spectrum at the start which then optically becomes thin over a period of time. In additional, two separated emission knots emerging from the radio core during flaring period and linear polarization located near the core, were also detected, prompting astronomers led by Jongho Park to conclude gamma ray flares might arise through the compression of knots caused by a shockwaves inside the core. In additional, a near-infrared flare detected in 2019.

In 2021, PKS 1510−089 underwent a peculiar new state showing a decrease in optical flux, high-energy gamma ray flux in MeV bands and optical polarization degree, reaching zero in 2022. However the X-ray and high-energy gamma ray flux in GeV bands remained constant through the two years.

== Radio structure ==
According to Very Long Baseline interferometry radio imaging at both 6 and 20 cm, the source of PKS 1510−089 shows an unresolved core with a secondary component located 8" towards southeast. When viewed at 1.67 GHz, a dominant component is found lying in a north direction suggesting the core is faint at this frequency.

== Astrophysical jet ==
The jet of PKS 1510−089 is found to move at superluminal speeds. This jet is made up of a milli-arcsecond jet located at position angle -28° and an arcsecond jet with an initial position angle of 55°. Furthermore, the jet is also turbulent with its components moving faster. This causes them to interact with it creating plasma shocks. A counter jet located 0.3 mas from the core, appears to be dominated by shocked emission with a perfect aligned magnetic field. A bright knot of emission was detected in January 2010, which it was found moving down the jet at speeds of 22c while emitting strong gamma ray energy as the outburst in PKS 1510−089 increased.

== Quasi-periodic oscillation ==
The supermassive black hole in PKS 1510−089 is known to detect signals of quasi-periodic oscillation. One signal was detected in 2009 during the outburst lasting for five cycles with 3.6 day period. The second signal occurred in 2018 with a period of 92 days until in 2020, when the period evolved to around 650 days. In light of shifting oscillation periods, scientists established a model in order to compare the oscillation behavior of PKS 1510−089 suggesting a binary black hole system with non-asymmetric instability revolving around a central black hole near the innermost orbit. The presence of nearly equidistant magnetic islands in the inner part of the jet, as well as the geometric model which involves a plasma blob in a curved jet moving helically, seems to fit with observations, meaning its period shift was probably caused by a highly eccentric orbit of a secondary black hole.

== Supermassive black hole ==
=== Black hole mass ===
By measuring hydrogen spectral series and iron emission lines, scientists were able to identify a dark region absorbing emission of the object (broad line region). According to close-up spectroscopies, they found the observed frame region size is 61.1_{-3.2}^{+4.0} (64.7-_{10.6}^{+27.1}) light-days with an intrinsic line width speed of 1262 ± 247 km s^{−1}. By correlating the two values with the laws of gravitation, they were able to identify a black hole mass of 5.71_{-0.58}^{+0.62} × 10^{7} M_{☉}. However, a study estimated the mass of the black hole to be 1.37 × 10^{9} M_{☉} while another study calculates the mass as 5.4 × 10^{8} M_{☉}, from the blazar's recorded isotopic luminosity of 2 × 10^{48} erg s^{−1}.

=== Secondary black hole ===
Based on current measurements, it is proposed PKS 1510−089 has a secondary black hole. It is found orbiting around the primary black hole with a period of 336 ± 14 days and a projected distance of 0.1 parsecs from each other. The mass of the secondary black hole is 1.37 × 10^{7} M_{☉}.
