= PKS 1402+044 =

Quasar in the constellation of Virgo

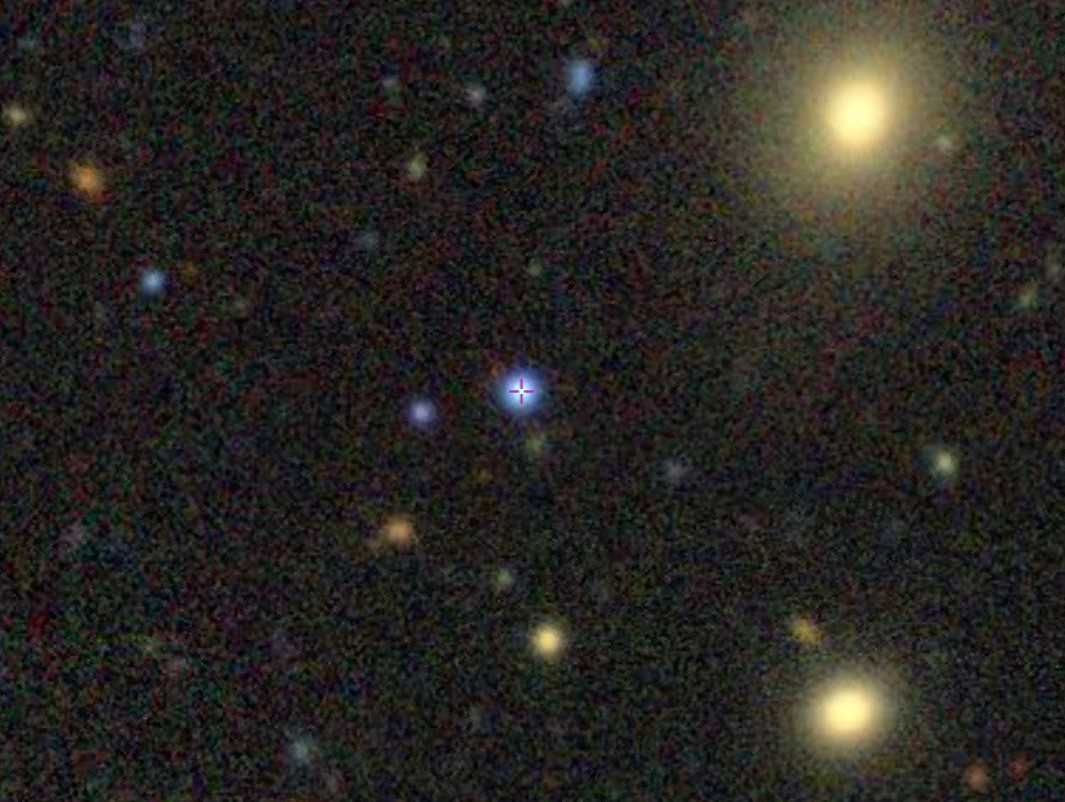
- PKS 1402+044 captured by DESI Legacy Surveys

Observation data (J2000.0 epoch)
- Constellation: Virgo
- Right ascension: 14h 05m 01.12s
- Declination: +04d 15m 35.82s
- Redshift: 3.207977
- Heliocentric radial velocity: 961,727 km/s
- Distance: 11.323 Gly (light travel time distance)
- Apparent magnitude (V): 0.074
- Apparent magnitude (B): 0.098
- Surface brightness: 19.6

Characteristics
- Type: FSRQ; BAL, BLLAC

Other designations
- NVSS J140501+041536, FIRST J140501.1+041535, PGC 2827828, TXS 1402+044, IRCF J140501.1+041535, ZS 1402+043, MRC 1402+044, PMN J1405+0415, SDSS J140501.12+041535.7

PKS 1402+044 is a quasar located in the constellation of Virgo. It has a redshift of 3.207, estimating the object to be located 11.3 billion light-years away from Earth.

== Characteristics ==
PKS 1402+044 is classified as a broad absorption-line quasar (BAL QSO) observed by Sloan Digital Sky Survey with a flat-spectrum radio source. It is also classified a blazar, a type of active galaxy and such produces a powerful astrophysical jet that is shot out into the depths of intergalactic space.

The blazar is known to be in its quiescent state, but it shows repeated periods of outbursts that are visible throughout the electromagnetic spectrum. According to observations from Gamma-Ray Blazar Survey and Fermi Gamma-Ray Space Telescope, PKS 1402+044 is found optically variable with >6σ significance, γ-ray detected and more Compton dominated than high synchrotron peaked (HSP) BL Lac objects.

Through radio imaging by researchers, the quasar is core-dominated with fluctuating radio emission and radio morphology found smaller in comparison of steep-spectrum quasars. The quasar is radio-loud with straightened jet magnetic fields along its source axis and a lobe field found to have a misaligned orientation.
