= PKS 0735+178 =

Quasar in the constellation Gemini

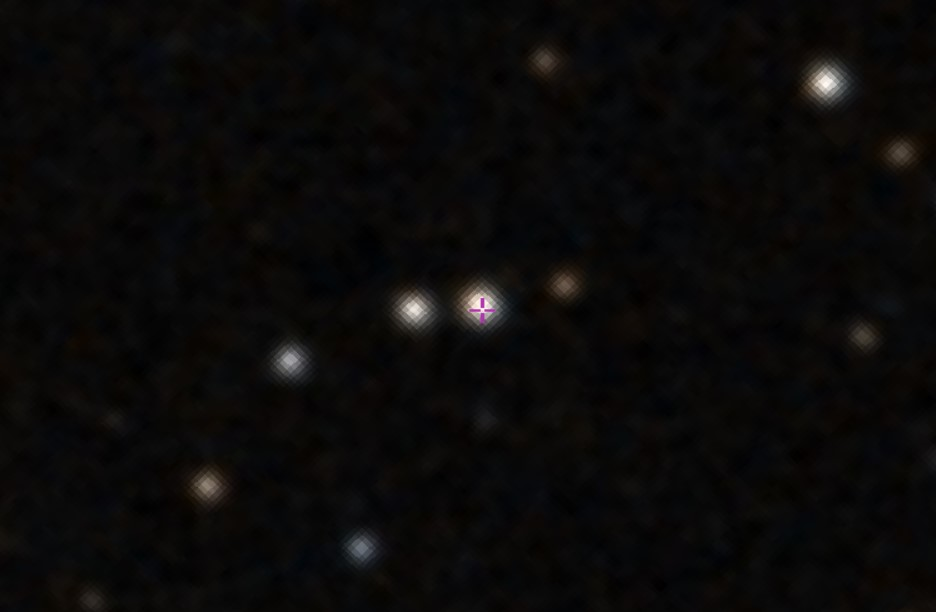
- The BL Lac object PKS 0735+178

Observation data (Epoch J2000)
- Constellation: Gemini
- Right ascension: 07^{h} 38^{m} 07.394^{s}
- Declination: +17° 42′ 19.00″
- Redshift: 0.424
- Distance: 7,380 Mly (2,263 Mpc)
- Type: BL Lac blazar
- Apparent magnitude (V): 16.22
- Notable features: Candidate neutrino source

Other designations
- QSO J0738+1742, LEDA 2825195

PKS 0735+178 is a classical BL Lac object in the northern constellation of Gemini. This is one of the brightest objects of its type in the night sky. It has a redshift of z = 0.424, with a luminosity distance of 7,380 million light-years (2,263 Mpc). PKS 0735+178 is a nearly point-like source with an angular size of a milliarcsecond.

This object was identified as a radio source during the third part of a radio survey at the Parkes Observatory, and became catalogued as PKS 0735+178. An optical counterpart was found in 1970 which showed a continuous optical spectrum. In contrast, the radio emission is variable at frequencies greater than 6 GHz. The radio spectrum appears mostly flat above 1 GHz and the properties are similar to BL Lacertae. That is, it is an extragalactic object that resembles a quasar but lacks optical emission lines. It has a very complex light curve which shows indications of periodicity.

Gamma-ray emission was detected from this source in 1999. X-ray and gamma-ray emission was found to be steady from this source, whereas it displayed extreme variability in radio and optical bands. Radio images of this object produced via very long baseline interferometry show a compact core with a jet that extends toward the northeast. The latter displays features of superluminal motion. Higher resolution observations show a pair of bends in the jet.

In 2021, this target was found to be a candidate source for multiple neutrino events. Neutrino event 211208A was detected by the IceCube observatory and a best fit location was found within 2.2° of PKS 0735+178. This observation occurred while PKS 0735+178 was undergoing a particularly strong flare event that was detected in the optical, ultraviolet, X-ray, and gamma-ray bands.
