= PKS 0458−020 =

Quasar in the constellation Orion

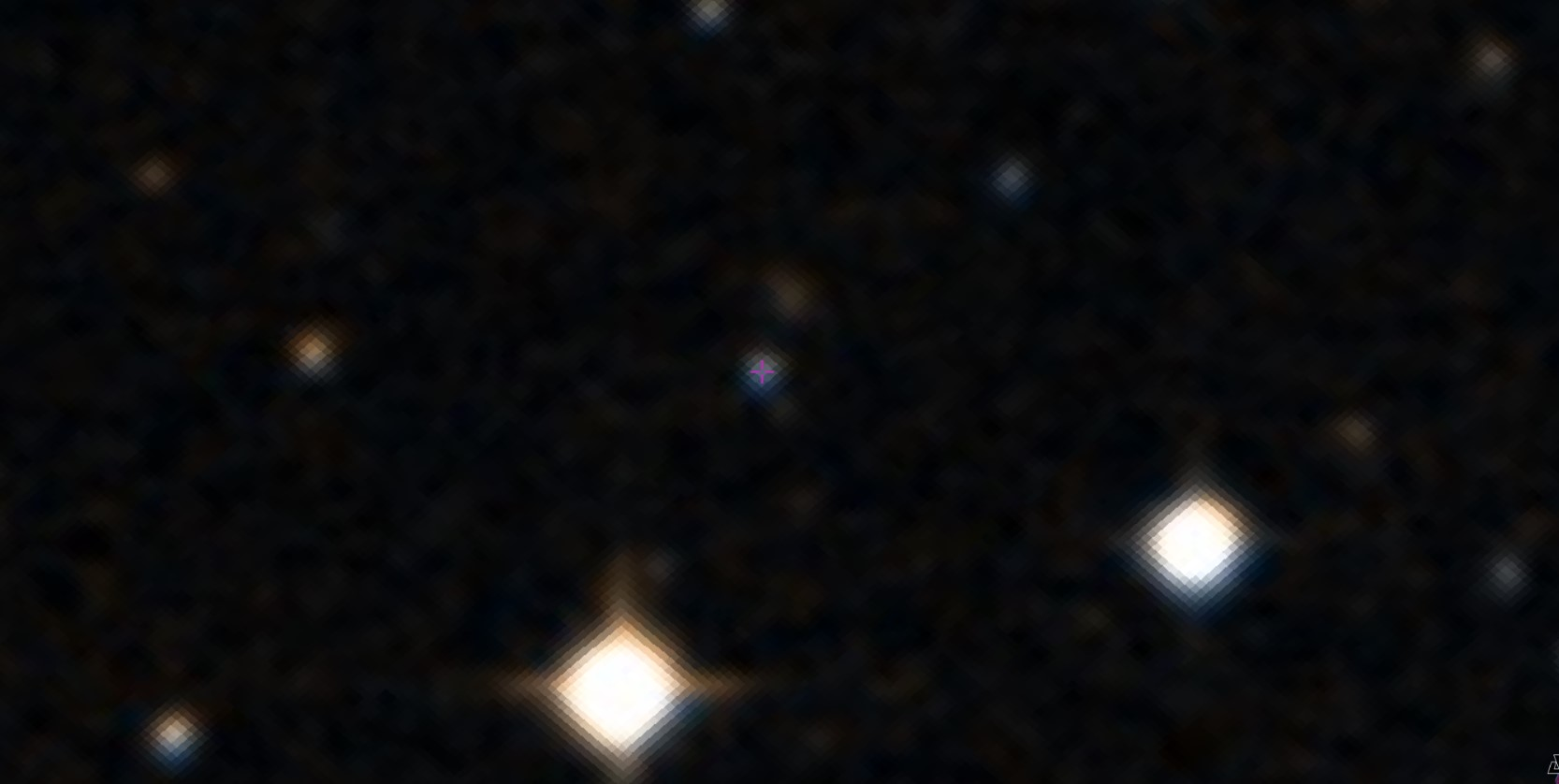
- The quasar/blazar PKS 0458−020

Observation data (J2000.0 epoch)
- Constellation: Orion
- Right ascension: 05^{h} 01^{m} 12.809^{s}
- Declination: −01° 59′ 14.256″
- Redshift: 2.286000
- Heliocentric radial velocity: 685,326 km/s
- Distance: 10.447 Gly
- Apparent magnitude (V): 18.06
- Apparent magnitude (B): 19.1

Characteristics
- Type: Blazar, HPQ, FRSQ

Other designations
- 4C −02.19, PKS 0458−02, TXS 0458−020, LEDA 2818086, DA 157, OF -098, 4FGL J0501.2−0158, S3 0458−02

PKS 0458−020 also known as PKS 0458−02, is a quasar located in the constellation of Orion. It has a redshift of (z) 2.286 and was first identified as an astronomical radio source during the radio survey conducted by Parkes Observatory in 1966. Subsequently the source was shown to display optical behavior before being classified as a blazar via an optical polarimetry study in 1985. This source also shows radio spectrum appearing to be flat, hence making it a flat-spectrum radio quasar (FRSQ).

== Description ==
PKS 0458−020 is found variable across the electromagnetic spectrum and a source of gamma ray activity. It is known to show optical flares which was detected by Fermi Gamma-ray Space Telescope (Fermi LAT) and by the Nordic Optical Telescope in September 2012, where it was reported to be 30 times brighter than its daily flux of (E > 100 MeV) when recorded by Fermi LAT. A near infrared flare was detected in January 2015.

The radio structure of PKS 0458−020 is extended across a wide scale range. Radio images of the object produced via Very Large Array (VLA), showed two unique components separated by 1.8 arcseconds with a position angle of -127°. A jet can be seen heading northwest before veering southwest. This jet also appears to have a sharp bend by around 60° based on 15 and 43 GHz imaging. There is a strong compact radio core straddled by extended emission which yields a projected angular size of 3.5 arcseconds. A secondary structure is located southwest from the core with a bridge-like structure almost connecting it. There is also some lobe luminosity located on the side of the counterjet with the jet's side having halo emission.

The supermassive black hole in PKS 0458−020 is estimated to be 8 × 10^{8} M_{☉} based on an L_{d} value corresponding to the peaking of a disk spectrum with the disk luminosity being L_{d} ~ 2 × 10^{46} erg s^{−1}.

Two absorption line systems located at redshifts (z) 2.039 and (z) 2.04 were detected towards the object with the former having the largest known redshift at radio wavelengths.
