= MS 0011.7+0837 =

Radio galaxy in the constellation Pisces

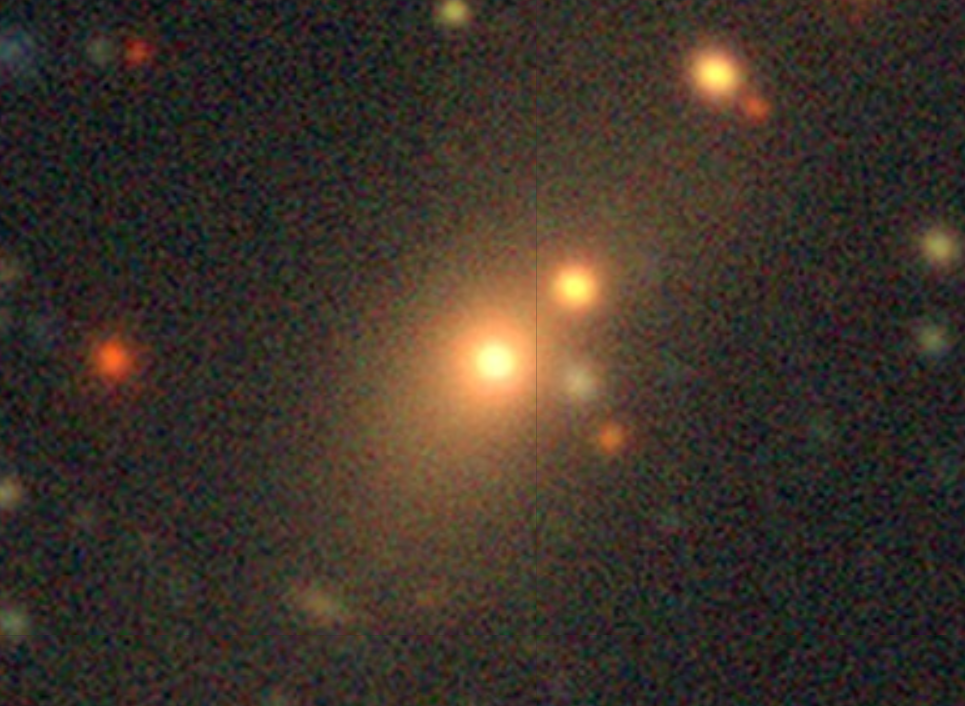
- DESI Legacy Surveys image of MS 0011.7+0837

Observation data (J2000.0 epoch)
- Constellation: Pisces
- Right ascension: 00^{h} 14^{m} 19.73^{s}
- Declination: +08° 54′ 01.89″
- Redshift: 0.163249
- Heliocentric radial velocity: 48,941 ± 7 km/s
- Distance: 2,360.4 ± 165.2 Mly (723.70 ± 50.66 Mpc)
- magnitude (J): 14.41
- magnitude (H): 13.71

Characteristics
- Type: cD;Candidate BLLAC
- Size: ~455,000 ly (139.4 kpc) (estimated)

Other designations
- 2MASX J00141971+0854014, LEDA 1355851, EXSS 0011.7+0837, GB6 J0014+0854, NVSS J001419+085402, PMN J0014+853, BZB J0014+0854

MS 0011.7+0837 is a radio galaxy located in the constellation of Pisces. The redshift of the galaxy is (z) 0.163 and it was first discovered by astronomers in October 1994. The object has also been classified as a type-cD galaxy and such dominates the center of a poor galaxy cluster.

== Description ==
MS 0011.7+0837 is categorized as a Fanaroff-Riley Class Type 1 radio galaxy. The radio structure of the galaxy has been found to be compact with a core-jet morphology. The total integrated radio flux density of the source at 4.3 GHz, is known to decrease to 39 mJy from 43 mJy, between 2014 and 2015. The central radio core is found to be resolved with an approximate full width at half maximum axis of 0.7 × 0.8 milliarcseconds, with the core's total flux density being 74.54 ± 0.22 mJy. There is also a presence of a radio jet with a jet power of 45.52 erg s^{−1}. The largest angular size of the source is found to be 118.9 arcseconds.

The galaxy has also been classified as a BL Lacertae object of low luminosity based on studies. There are also detections of X-ray emission described as having an elongated appearance from east to west direction of the axis with the peak of the emission coinciding with the galaxy's radio core. The galaxy has detections of liner polarization shown reaching around 6.6 ± 0.4%. The supermassive black hole in the center of the galaxy has been found to be 8.85 M_{☉} while the broad-line region (BLR) luminosity is 42.37 erg s^{−1}.
