= QSO B0738+313 =

Quasar in the constellation of Gemini

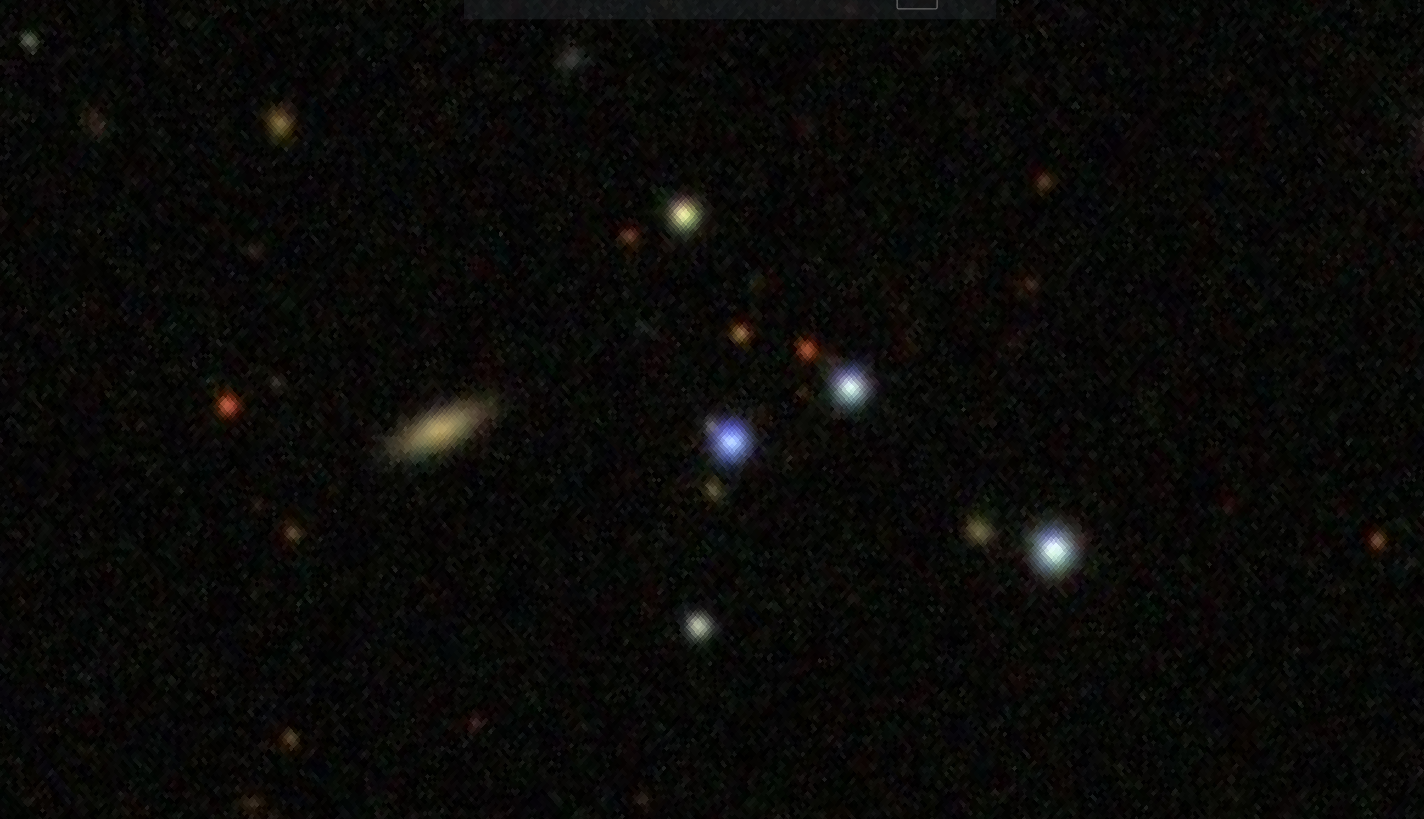
- QSO B0728+313 imaged by SDSS.

Observation data (J2000.0 epoch)
- Constellation: Gemini
- Right ascension: 07^{h} 41^{m} 10.70^{s}
- Declination: +31° 12′ 00.22″
- Redshift: 0.630995
- Heliocentric radial velocity: 189,186 km/s
- Distance: 5.729 Gly
- Apparent magnitude (V): 16.89
- Apparent magnitude (B): 17.02

Characteristics
- Type: Opt.var; LPQ Sy1

Other designations
- SDSS J074110.70+311200.2, 2MASS J07411070+3112002, KODIAQ J074110+311200, OI +363, NVSS J074110+311200, CRATES J0741+3112, TXS 0738+313, CoNFIG 005, IERS B0738+313, WMAP 107

QSO B0738+313 or B2 0738+313, is a quasar located in the constellation of Gemini. It has a redshift of (z) 0.630 and it was first discovered as an astronomical radio source in 1968 by astronomers who designated it as OI 363. The object has a radio spectrum appearing as flat making it a flat-spectrum radio quasar but also a gigahertz-peaked spectrum source.

== Description ==
QSO B0738+313 is classified as a core-dominated radio-loud quasar with an X-ray luminosity of L_{0.1-10 KeV} ~ 45 erg s^{−1}. However, the polarization level of the object is low. When observed by astronomers during R-band monitoring for four nights, its light curve was described as clear and almost sinusoidal with a few variations occurring on 21 January and 22 December 2006. In its spectrum, the quasar displays two dampened Lyman-alpha absorption-line systems located at redshifts of (z) 0.0912 and (z) 0.2212, making these the lowest known absorption-line systems of its kind. Two other faint companions were found, although not relating to the quasar.

The quasar has a compact radio structure. When imaged with the Very Long Baseline Array at 15 GHz, it has two strong components. The first component is found weakly polarized at 0.5% with an inverted spectrum, while the other is polarized by around 1.5%. There are also weak and diffused radio lobes on each side of a much stronger radio component. Very Long Baseline Interferometry imaging at six centimeters showed the structure has an unresolved radio core, a small surface brightness radio emission surrounding the source and a jet located in north-south which extends by 5 milliarcseconds. This jet also displays a sharp bend at 45° towards the south-west direction with a knot at its bend.

=== X-ray jet ===
An X-ray jet was discovered in QSO B0738+313 by Chandra X-ray observatory in March 2003. Based on results, the X-ray jet has an extent of 200 kiloparsecs and is narrow. Observations also showed the X-ray jet is curving as well, which then follows the path of a radio structure south of the quasar and terminating at a hotspot located within the southernmost part of a radio lobe. As it moves further from the core, the jet emission becomes fainter. Astronomers found the X-ray emission is centered strongly towards the jet's direction, 3.8 arcseconds south from the radio core suggesting location of innermost components of the jet.
