= PKS 0605−085 =

Quasar in the constellation of Monoceros

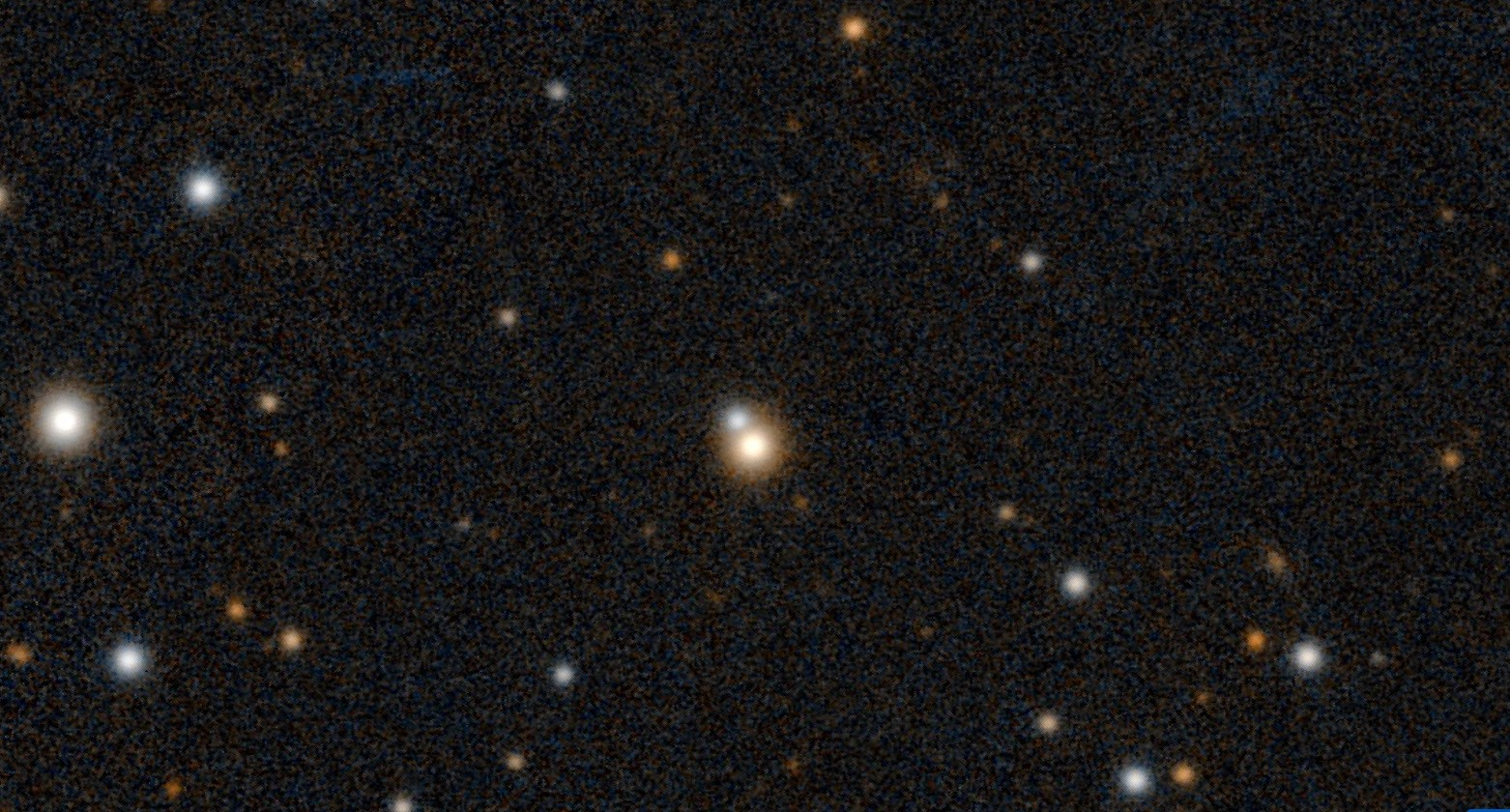
- The quasar PKS 0605−085

Observation data (J2000.0 epoch)
- Constellation: Monoceros
- Right ascension: 06^{h} 07^{m} 59.699^{s}
- Declination: −08° 34′ 49.97″
- Redshift: 0.870000
- Heliocentric radial velocity: 260,819 km/s
- Distance: 6.971 Gly
- Apparent magnitude (V): 17.60

Characteristics
- Type: HPQ FSRQ
- Notable features: Candidate neutrino source, radio jet

Other designations
- OH −010, NVSS J060759−083450, LEDA 2824649, RX J0607.9−0834, 4FGL J0608.0−0835, CGRaBS J0607−0834

PKS 0605−085 is a quasar located in the constellation of Monoceros. It has a redshift of (z) 0.87 with an estimated light travelling time of 7 billion light-years. It was first discovered by astronomers who were conducting the Parkes Survey at the Australian National Radio Astronomy Observatory in 1966. The radio spectrum of the source appears to be flat, making it a flat-spectrum radio quasar with high polarization.

== Description ==
The radio structure of PKS 0605−085 is compact. When observed by Very Long Baseline Interferometry, its structure appears as asymmetric with an extremely compact radio core and a structure located west, interpreted as a tight loop. Observations made with Very Large Array, found there is a secondary component located 5 milliarcseconds to the south of the core. A radio jet can be seen originating at a position angle of 93° before bending towards southeast direction, with its magnetic field shown perpendicular towards its local axis. This jet is also detected in X-rays by Chandra X-ray Observatory, displaying two known detected knots and faint intraknot radio emission. Third epoch observations suggested the core and jet are separated by 3.3 milliarcseconds.

The core and jet of PKS 0605−085 are found to display Faraday rotation measure. When observed, the estimated rotation measures are estimated to be 364 ± 20 and 287 ± 57 rad m^{−2}. Located 2 milliarcseconds from the core region, there is a flattening of a rotation measure slope.

PKS 0605−085 displays long-term radio variability. Based on monitoring data taken by University of Michigan Radio Astronomical Observatory, the light curve of the source shows long flux density variability, exceeding more than 30 years at 8 GHz frequencies. Observations also showed PKS 0605−085 has undergone strong periodic flaring outbursts occurring in 1973, 1981, 1988 and around 1995 to 1996, displaying different spectral properties. Almost all the flares showed a flat spectrum with the exception of the 1981 flare. In its jet, astronomers identified seven superluminal jet components which were found moving outwards at speeds of 0.12 to 0.66 milliarcseconds per year. They also identified a quasi-stationary jet component following a helical path with a period of eight years. This suggests the possibility of either a jet instability or the orbiting of a secondary black hole around a primary black hole.
