= CTD 135 =

Quasar in the constellation of Pegasus

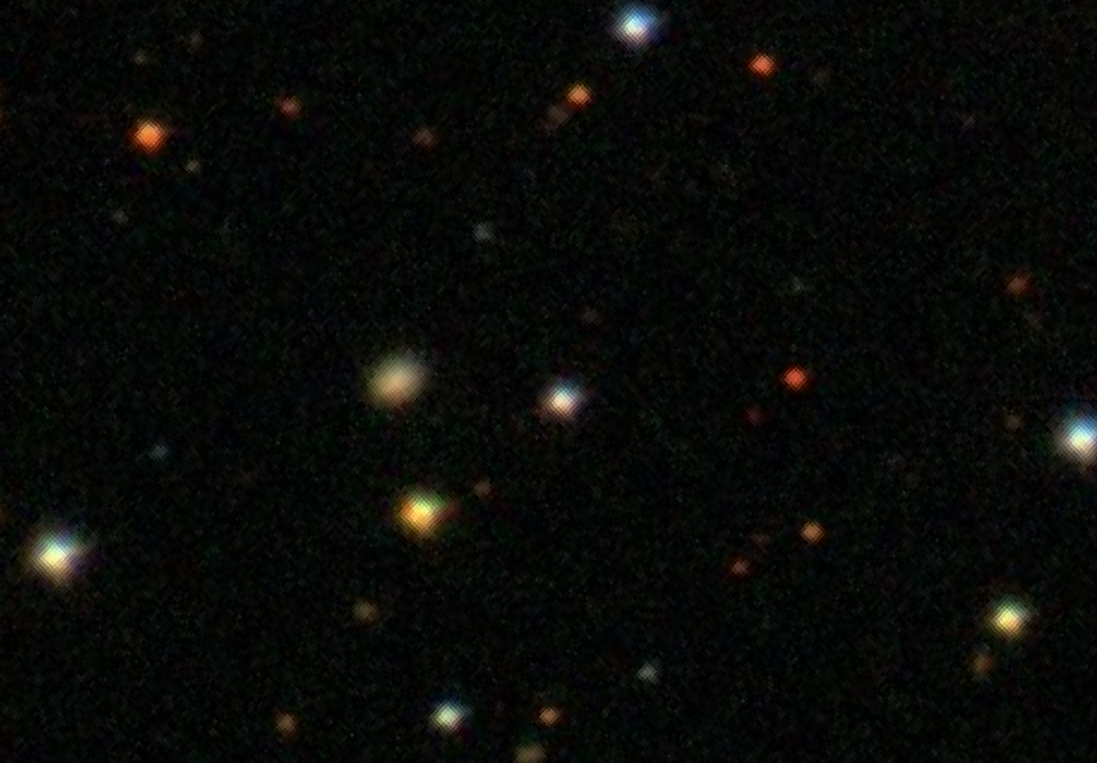
- SDSS image of CTD 135.

Observation data (J2000.0 epoch)
- Constellation: Pegasus
- Right ascension: 22^{h} 36^{m} 22.47^{s}
- Declination: +28° 28′ 57.41″
- Redshift: 0.790000
- Heliocentric radial velocity: 236,836 km/s
- Distance: 6.976 Gly
- Apparent magnitude (V): 19.0
- Apparent magnitude (B): 19.1

Characteristics
- Type: HPQ FSRQ

Other designations
- 2MASS J22362246+2828570, NVSS J223622+282858, OY +256, TXS 2234+282, IRCF J223622.4+282857, B2 2234+82A, 87GB 223359.9+281325, FL8Y J2236.4+2828

CTD 135 is a radio-loud quasar located in the constellation of Pegasus. The redshift of the object is (z) 0.790 and it was first discovered as an astronomical radio source in 1970 by astronomers. It is classified as a BL Lacertae object and has a flat radio spectrum thus categorizing it a flat-spectrum radio quasar.

== Description ==
CTD 135 is found to have a compact radio structure. When observed at both 4.8 and 1.4 GHz frequencies, it has one component that is found to be unsolved with an extend of 5 milliarcseconds. At 8.4 GHz, the source has a radio jet that is positioned at 60° with multiple bright component features. There is a radio core present that has a brightness temperature of 0.1 x 10^{12} Kelvin. This core is also suggested to be self-absorbed and weak at frequency range below 15 GHz. Two other components are found; a southwest component that has a flat radio spectrum and a northern east component that contains a steep radio spectrum. The flux density of the core is estimated to be 755 ± 39 mJy at 15 GHz. The host galaxy of CTD 135 has been suggested to be a luminous giant elliptical galaxy with a total host magnitude of -25.30 ± 0.41.

Studies have found CTD 135 is a blazar. When observed, it is known to display significant variability on long-term light curves and also within the a short timespan of a few day period. A near infrared flare was detected on 26 November 2010. On 12 January 2016, it had another near infrared flare, which its optical brightness corresponds to around 14.78 ± 0.04. In November 2024, the quasar had shown a new flare which increased its luminosity by a factor of 64 in H-band.

A possible quasi-periodic oscillation signature was detected in CTD 135 in October 2021. Based on its long-term light curve data, it is estimated to be 460 days long. The central supermassive black hole of the quasar is 10^{8.35} M_{☉} with the accretion disk luminosity being 6.03 × 10^{45} erg s^{−1}.
