= NVSS J141343+433945 =

Type-cD galaxy in the constellation Boötes

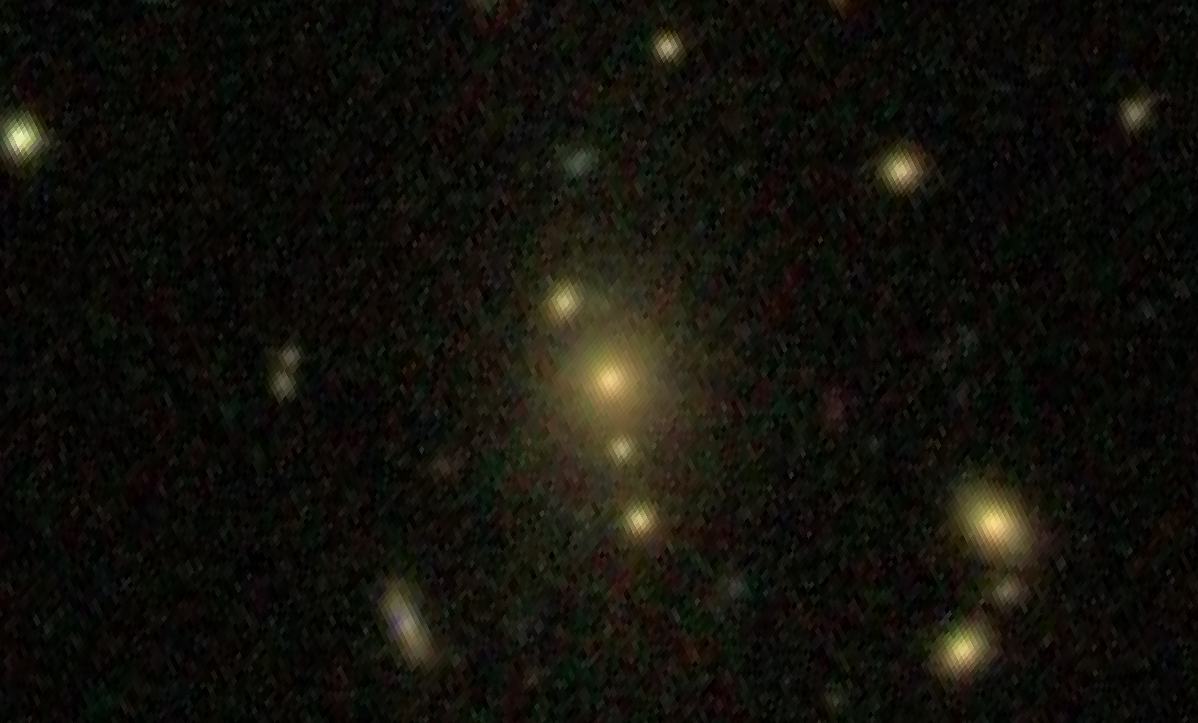
- SDSS image of NVSS J141343+433945

Observation data (J2000.0 epoch)
- Constellation: Boötes
- Right ascension: 14^{h} 13^{m} 43.72^{s}
- Declination: +43° 39′ 45.04″
- Redshift: 0.089326
- Heliocentric radial velocity: 26,779 ± 3 km/s
- Distance: 1,307.4 ± 91.5 Mly (400.86 ± 28.06 Mpc)
- magnitude (J): 14.20

Characteristics
- Type: cD;BLRG blazar
- Size: ~236,000 ly (72.4 kpc) (estimated)

Other designations
- 2MASX J14134379+4339450, Abell 1885:[CEF95], LEDA 2226096, BZU J1413+4339, RGB J1413+436, RX J1413.7+4339:[BEV98] 003

NVSS J141343+433945 also known as RGB J1413+436, is a Type-cD galaxy located in the constellation of Boötes. The redshift of the object is (z) 0.089 and it was first discovered from a sample of radio-loud active galactic nuclei by astronomers in 1998. It is classified as a broad-line radio galaxy and is the brightest cluster galaxy of Abell 1885, dominating the center of the galaxy cluster.

== Description ==
NVSS J141343+433945 contains a low luminosity active galactic nucleus. When observed with Very Long Baseline Interferometry (VLBI), the source is found compact but has no signs of any extended structures. The optical spectrum of the galaxy also displays strong signatures of emission lines mainly made up of ionized oxygen, hydrogen beta and hydrogen alpha. There is also a presence of an X-ray source with the total X-ray luminosity that is estimated to be 1.7 × 10^{44} erg s^{−1}. Evidence also suggested that the galaxy is also a BL Lacertae candidate. The molecular line luminosity is 1.1 × 10^{40} erg s^{−1} while the hydrogen alpha luminosity is 5.4 × 10^{40} erg s^{−1}.

A study published in 2025, has found the active galactic nucleus of the galaxy is relatively young. Based on studies, the nucleus is depicted as bright in X-rays with the source being mainly resolved into a central point source. The radio core is found to be resolved and there are presence of two-sided radio jets towards both the east and west direction from the location of the core. The total jet power is about 102 ± 66 × 10^{42} erg s^{−1}. On parsec-scale imaging made at 5 GHz frequencies, the flux density of the source is 34.3 ± 3.0 mJy. The supermassive black hole lying in the center of the galaxy is estimated to be 4.7 ± 1.1 × 10^{8} M_{☉} and the total star formation rate is estimated to be 0.4 M_{☉} per year. The ionized gas is mainly concentrated on the nucleus, however it is also shown as elongated by 30 kiloparsecs.
