= AP Librae =

Active galactic nucleus in the constellation Libra

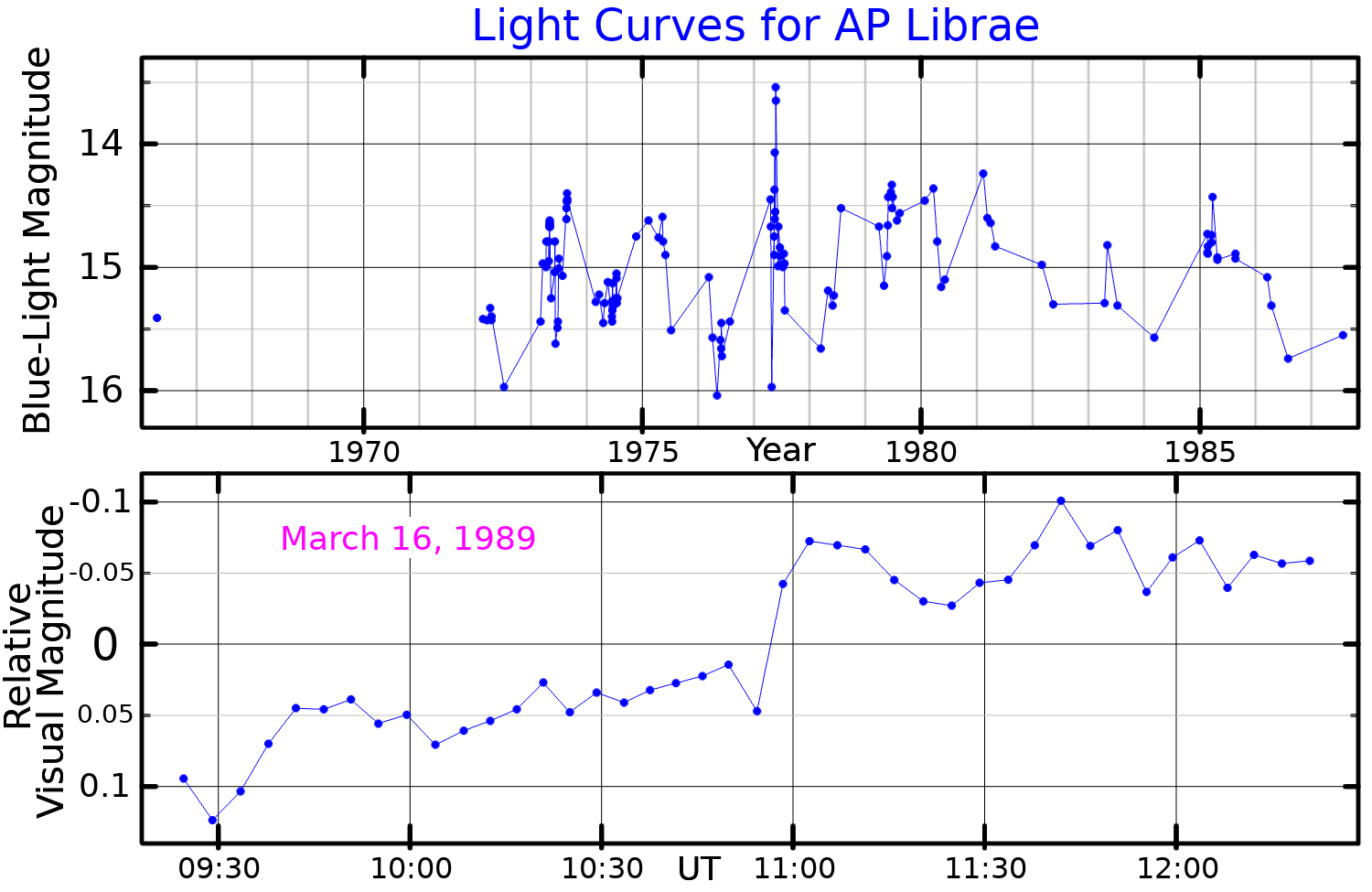
- Light curves for AP Librae. Top panel: The long-term variability, plotted from data published by Fan & Lin (2000). Bottom panel: short-timescale variability, adapted from Carini et al. (1991)

Observation data (Epoch J2000)
- Constellation: Libra
- Right ascension: 15^{h} 17^{m} 41.814^{s}
- Declination: −24° 22′ 19.48″
- Redshift: 0.049
- Distance: 700 Mly (215 Mpc)
- Type: BL Lac
- Apparent dimensions (V): 0′.323 × 0′.278
- Apparent magnitude (V): 14.0
- Notable features: Highly active; emits a one-sided radio jet

Other designations
- AP Lib, LEDA 54592, PKS 1514-24, QSO B1514-24

AP Librae is a BL Lacertae object located at a distance of 700 million light years in the southern constellation of Libra. In the visual band it is one of the most active blazars known. AP Lib is surrounded by an extended source with a spectrum characteristic of a red-shifted giant elliptical galaxy. The derived visual magnitude of this region is 15.0, and it follows a radially decreasing brightness that is characteristic of an elliptical. Seven fainter galaxies are visible within an angular radius of 9′, suggesting it is the brightest member of a galactic cluster.

This object was first identified as an optical variable by Martha D. Ashbrook in 1942, who noted the brightness changed irregularly from magnitude 15.0 down to 16.0. The source was found to vary chaotically on time scales of days and even hours. Howard E. Bond and Francois Biraud in 1971 noted the coincidence of this object with the position of the radio source PKS 1514–24. In 1965, John G. Bolton and associates identified the latter as a sixteenth magnitude elliptical galaxy. Glenn M. Frye and associates in 1971 suggested that it may be a gamma-ray source. The similarity of this object to BL Lacertae was noted, leading to it being designated as a BL Lac object.

AP Librae emits a synchrotron radiation component to its spectral energy distribution (SED). The peak component of this radiation lies in the infrared band, making this a low-frequency peaked BL Lac (LBL). It is one of the few LBLs known to emit gamma rays. The width of the high energy component of the SED is considered extremely broad for objects of this class, ranging in energy from around 0.1 keV up to the TeV level. In 1998–99, extended radio emission was detected from a one-sided jet that starts in a south-easterly direction from the source before bending to the northeast. This non-thermal jet extends 15″ from AP Lib (equivalent to ~46 kly), and in 2013 was found to emit X-rays. The jet may be the source for the gamma-ray emission in the TeV range.
