= RGB 1745+398 =

BL Lacertae object in the constellation Hercules

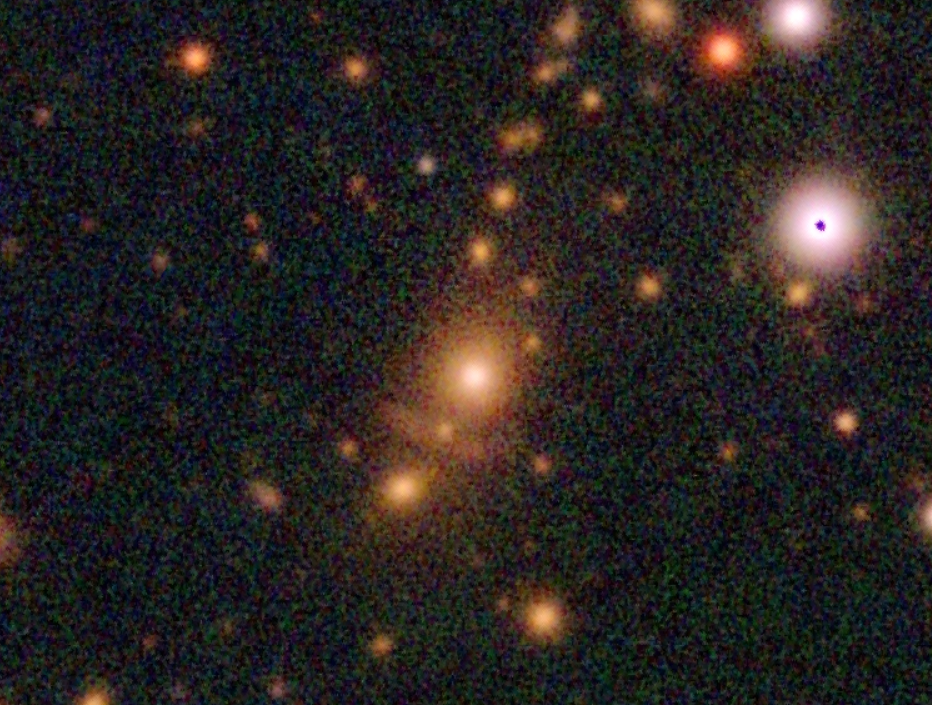
- Pan-STARRS image of RGB 1745+398

Observation data (J2000.0 epoch)
- Constellation: Hercules
- Right ascension: 17^{h} 45^{m} 37.76^{s}
- Declination: +39° 51′ 30.72″
- Redshift: 0.267000
- Heliocentric radial velocity: 80,045 ± 0 km/s
- Distance: 3,859.8 ± 270.2 Mly (1,183.42 ± 82.84 Mpc)
- Apparent magnitude (V): 16.11
- magnitude (J): 14.45

Characteristics
- Type: BLLAC
- Size: ~466,000 ly (142.9 kpc) (estimated)

Other designations
- B3 1743+39C, 2MASX J17453776+3951309, 5BZG J1745+3951, NVSS J174537+395131, RX J1745.5+3951, RX 1745.5+3951:[GEE2017] BCG, TXS 1743+398, LEDA 3889306

RGB 1745+398 is a BL Lacertae object located in the constellation of Hercules. The redshift of the object is (z) 0.267 and it was first discovered in 1997 by astronomers who categorized it as a gravitationally lensed galaxy with an active galactic nucleus (AGN).

== Description ==
RGB 1745+398 contains a gravitational-lensed arc structure that surrounds it. The arc has a length of around 15 arcseconds and is positioned in the southeast direction. The arc is also further resolved into smaller subcomponents with the entire optical spectrum displaying emission lines. Based on the presence of emission lines the arc is estimated to have a redshift of (z) 0.58. The host of RGB 1745+398 itself, is an elliptical galaxy residing as the brightest cluster galaxy (BCG) of a massive rich galaxy cluster. The central supermassive black hole of the galaxy is estimated to be 9.26 M_{☉} and the disk luminosity is around 43.90 erg s^{−1}.

The nucleus of RGB 1745+398 is active with a radio source present. The radio structure is highly distorted based on Very Large Array (VLA) radio imaging with a resolved radio core and a radio jet emerging out from it. This jet has a position angle of -28° and bends toward the west. Another jet is also seen emerging from the core with a position angle of 105°, then subsequently bending towards southeast. The two jets in total display sharp bends.

Radio imaging made by the Very Long Baseline Array (VLBA) suggested there is a component emerging out from the core in a southern direction. Observations made by the Low Frequency Array (LOFAR) also show the galaxy is a lobe-dominated source with a wide-angle tail morphology and the same bent jets in both directions. The radio spectrum is steep.

A study also found the presence of X-ray emission. The emission is described as extended and mainly concentrated near the arc structure. The galaxy itself is categorized as a radio-loud AGN but is also a low-luminosity X-ray object leading to its classification as a low energy peaked BL Lacertae object.
