= 3C 279 =

Optically violent variable quasar in the constellation Virgo

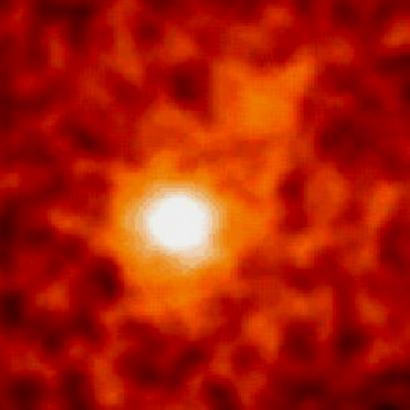

Observation data (J2000 epoch)
- Constellation: Virgo
- Right ascension: 12^{h} 56^{m} 11.1^{s}
- Declination: −05° 47′ 22″
- Redshift: 0.5362 ± 0.0004
- Distance: 5.0 Gly
- Apparent magnitude (V): 17.8

Other designations
- 3C279, 4C –05.55, NRAO 413, PKS 1253–05

3C 279 (also known as 4C–05.55, NRAO 413, and PKS 1253–05) is an optically violent variable quasar (OVV), which is known in the astronomical community for its variations in the visible, radio and X-ray bands. The quasar was observed to have undergone a period of extreme activity from 1987 until 1991. The Rosemary Hill Observatory (RHO) started observing 3C 279 in 1971, the object was further observed by the Compton Gamma Ray Observatory in 1991, when it was unexpectedly discovered to be one of the brightest gamma ray objects in the sky. It is also one of the brightest and most variable sources in the gamma ray sky monitored by the Fermi Gamma-ray Space Telescope. It was used as a calibrator source for Event Horizon Telescope observations of M87* that resulted in the first image of a black hole.

== Observations ==
- The apparent superluminal motion was detected during observations first made in 1973 in a jet of material departing from the quasar, though it should be understood that this effect is an optical illusion caused by naive estimations of the speed, and no truly superluminal motion is occurring.
- 16 June 2015, the 3C 279 had a large gamma-ray outburst, believed to be caused by the injection of high-speed electrons in the central, high-density region.
- Further observations with the Event Horizon Telescope during April 2017 provided a high level of detail to the radio jet, with a resolution as small as 20 micro-arcseconds. They indicated a bent or rotating jet shaped by shock waves.

== Gallery ==
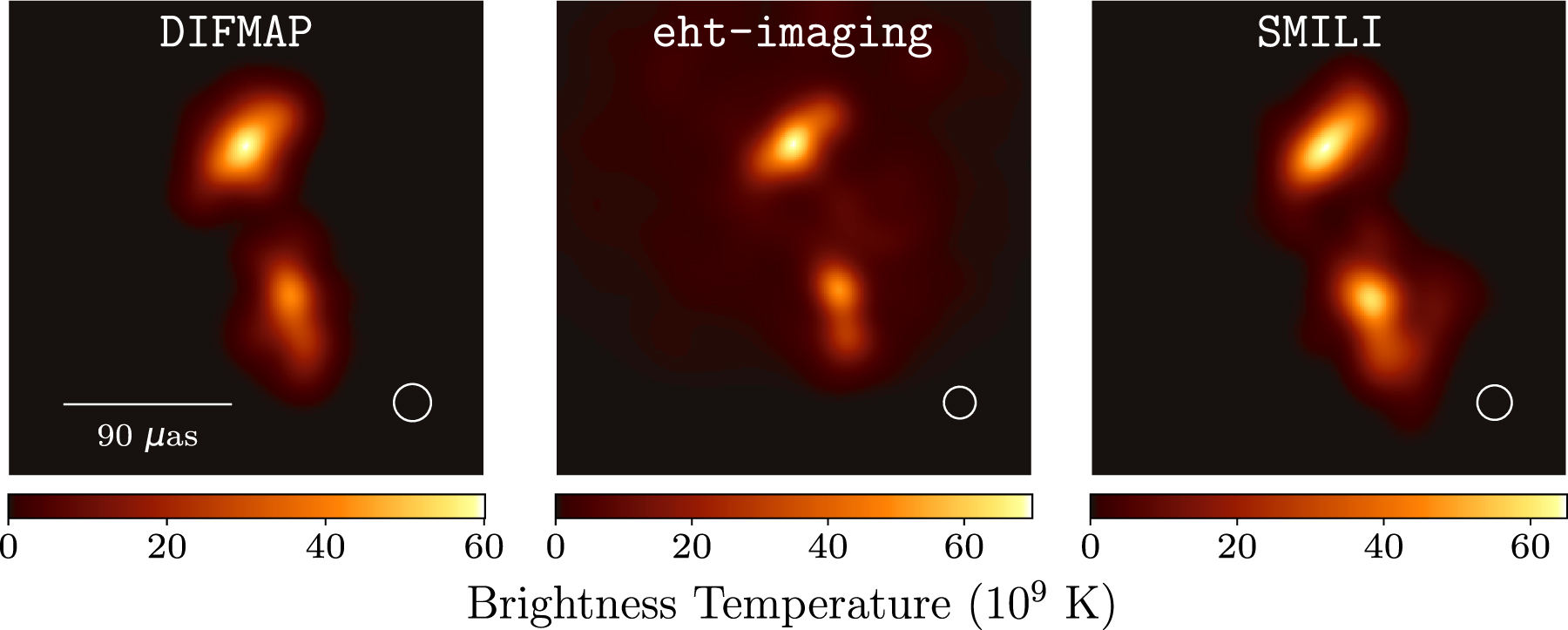
Representative images of 3C 279 from EHT observations

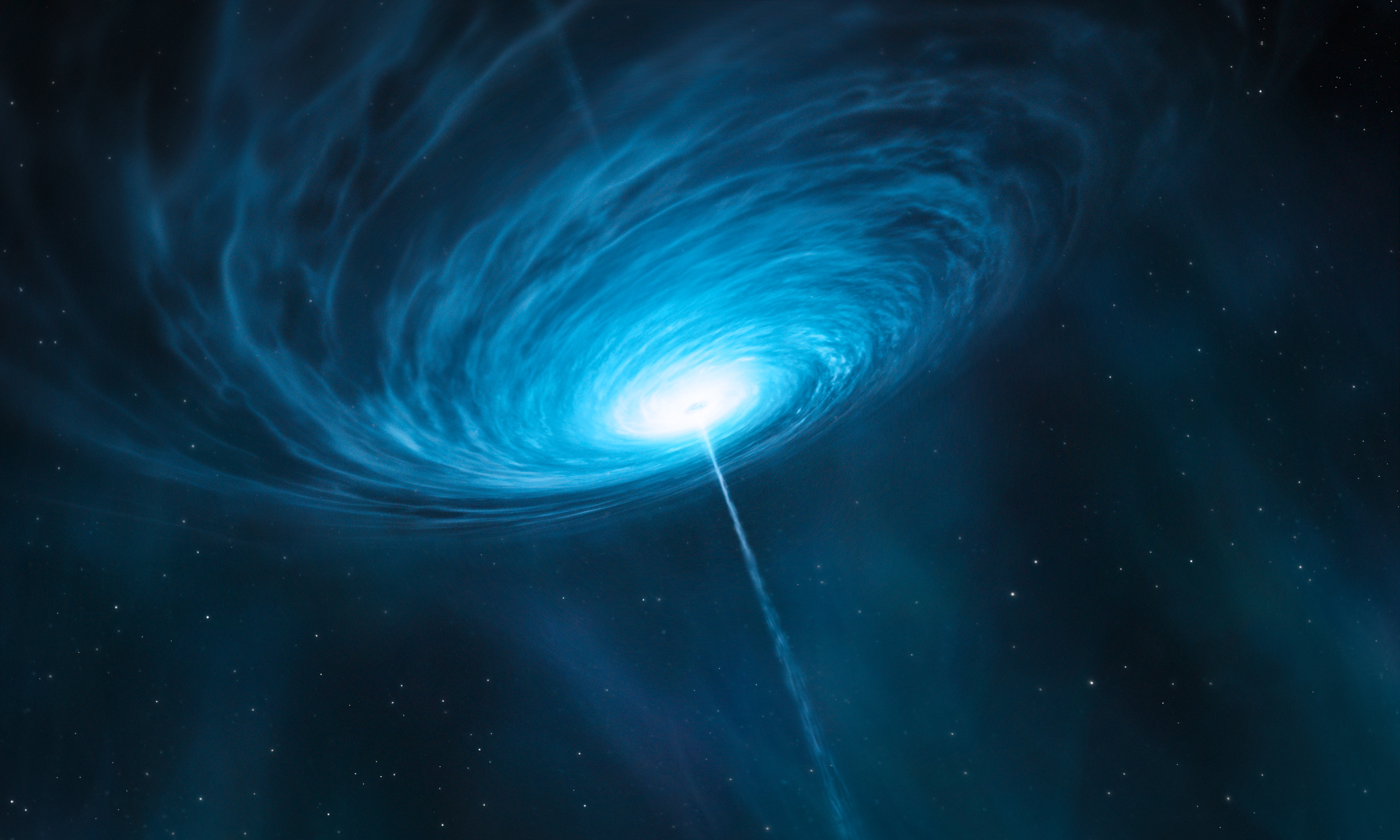
Artist's impression of the quasar 3C 279
