= 3C 371 =

Active galaxy in the constellation Draco

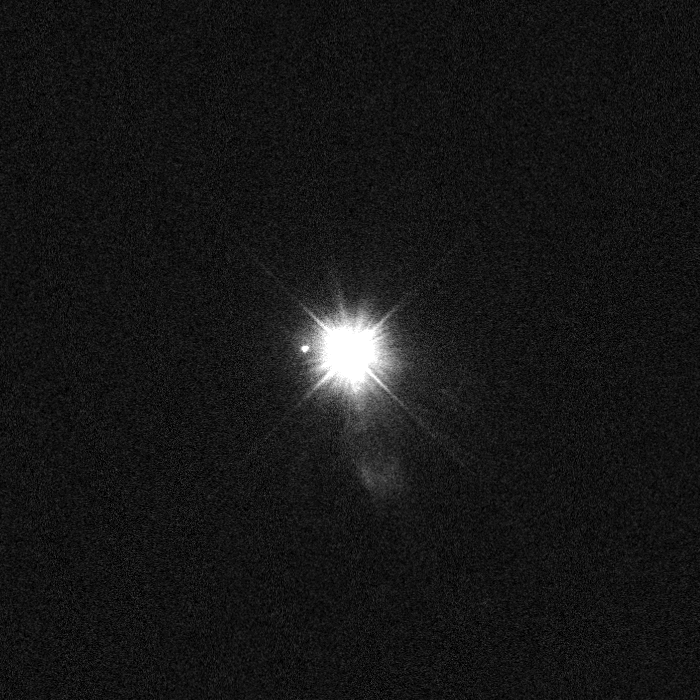
- Hubble Legacy Archive Near-UV image of the jet coming out of 3C 371

Observation data (Epoch J2000)
- Constellation: Draco
- Right ascension: 18^{h} 06^{m} 50.681^{s}
- Declination: +69° 49′ 28.11″
- Redshift: 0.051
- Distance: 730 million light-years 224 Mpc
- Type: BL Lac; FRI RG
- Apparent magnitude (V): 14.4 ±1.5

Other designations
- UGC 11130, PGC 61417, 2E 4023, 7C 180717.90+694858.00, QSO B1807+698

3C 371 is a BL Lac object located in the constellation Draco. With a redshift of 0.051, this active galaxy is about 730 million light-years away.

3C 371 is a well known object, first associated with the BL Lac class by Miller in 1975, and is among the nearest and brightest BL Lacs. Optical jet emission from 3C 371 was first detected in ground-based images by Nilsson et al. in 1997, and confirmed with HST (Scarpa et al.) in 1999. The implied viewing angle may be less than 18 degrees. But no superluminal motion has been detected, despite frequent monitoring by the Very Long Baseline Array (VLBA).

There are photos of this object dating back to 1895, and they suggest that this objects magnitude can vary by ±1.5.
