= Mike Disney =

British astronomer

Michael John Disney (born Bristol, England, 7 October 1937) is an astrophysicist. He discovered the optical component of the Crab Pulsar in 1969 with John Cocke, which was the first optical pulsar ever observed.

Disney was a member of the team that designed the camera for the Hubble Space Telescope. He was one of the pioneers in the discovery of low surface brightness galaxies.

Disney was a professor at Cardiff University until his forced retirement in 2005. Disney is an outspoken critic of the standard model of cosmology.

He was the co-author with Alan Wright of the humorous (and often mis-attributed) short story 'Impure Mathematics'.
