= Radio imaging =

Radio imaging is the general term for the composite effect of multiple and varied on-air sound effects that identify, brand and market a particular radio station. These sound effects include: voiceover, music beds, sweepers, breakers, intros, promos, liners, stingers, bumpers, shotguns, and jingles. The total effect of these on-air elements create an overall sound design, which positions a radio station and brand within the marketplace, and is designed to appeal to the demographics of the audience it wants the station to attract (e.g., Men, Age 18-54).

Radio Imaging sonically brands the radio station as clearly different and distinct from other entertainment brands; especially, from other radio stations in a given market. Radio Imaging enables radio listeners to easily identify a radio station and to distinguish a radio station favorably against competitors through a unique and enhanced image and sound, particularly in the same programming format (e.g., CHR, Country, Adult Contemporary, Sports, News/Talk, Classic Rock, Urban, etc.). Signature sound compositions comprise sonic branding that enables listeners to instantaneously identify the station that they are hearing and to anticipate the type of content or format that will be played on the station. In this way, Radio imaging sets the overall mood, energy and tone of the station, while establishing brand familiarity, affinity and loyalty with a listener. The language used in radio imaging is scripted with the station's target demographic in mind, for example radio stations targeting a younger audience will use language and terms that their listeners can relate to. Likewise, the voiceover used helps define the station brand. In addition, filler compositions including sweepers, promos, and jingles, create seamless transitions between programming units and enhance the overall sound of the station, providing a more complete and polished listening experience for the audience.
