= BL Lacertae object =

Type of active galactic nucleus

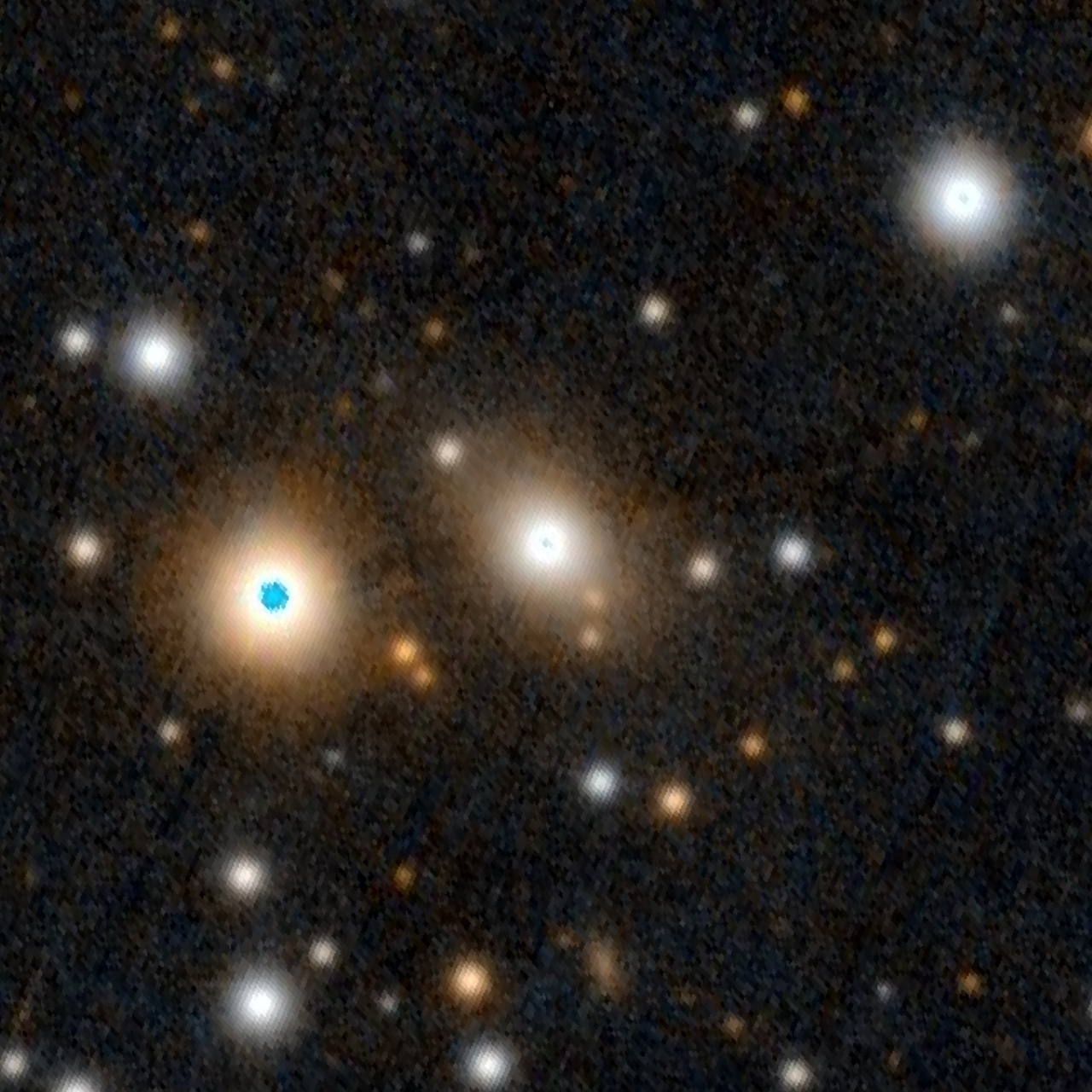
BL Lacertae (center) is the prototype of BL Lacertae objects, with the surrounding host elliptical galaxy visible. The bright object at its left is a foreground star, while pixelated smudges are effects of data processing.

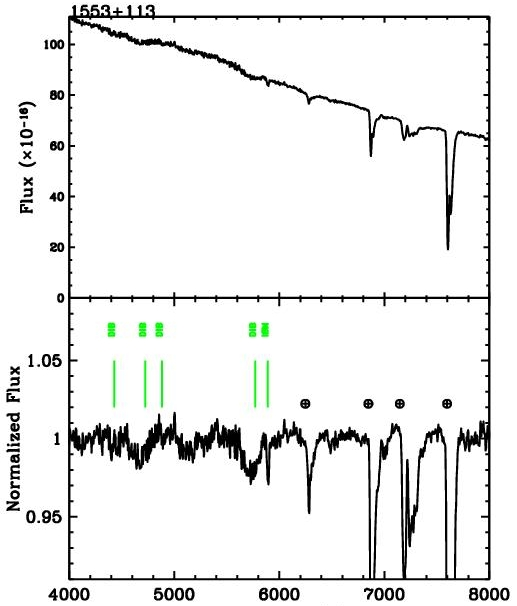
The optical spectrum of the BL Lac object PG 1553+11

A BL Lacertae object or BL Lac object is a type of active galactic nucleus (AGN) or a galaxy with such an AGN, named after its prototype, BL Lacertae. In contrast to other types of active galactic nuclei, BL Lacs are characterized by rapid and large-amplitude flux variability and significant optical polarization. Because of these properties, the prototype of the class (BL Lac) was originally thought to be a variable star. When compared to the more luminous active nuclei (quasars) with strong emission lines, BL Lac objects have spectra dominated by a relatively featureless non-thermal emission continuum over the entire electromagnetic range. This lack of spectral lines historically hindered identification of the nature and distance of such objects.

In the unified scheme of radio-loud active galactic nuclei, the observed nuclear phenomenology of BL Lacs is interpreted as being due to the effects of the relativistic jet closely aligned to the line of sight of the observer. BL Lacs are thought to be intrinsically identical to low-power radio galaxies. These active nuclei appear to be hosted in massive elliptical galaxies. From the point of AGN classification, BL Lacs are a blazar subtype. All known BL Lacs are associated with core dominated radio sources, many of them exhibiting apparent superluminal motion.

The blazar category encompasses all quasars oriented with the relativistic jet directed at the observer giving a unique radio emission spectrum. This includes BL Lacs as well as optically violent variable (OVV) quasars, however in general practice, "Blazar" and "BL Lac Object" are often used interchangeably. OVV quasars are generally more luminous and have stronger emission lines than BL Lac objects.

Some examples of BL Lac objects are BL Lacertae itself, OJ 287, AP Librae, PKS 2155-304, PKS 0521-365, Markarian 421, 3C 371, W Comae Berenices, ON 325 and Markarian 501.

== Host galaxies ==
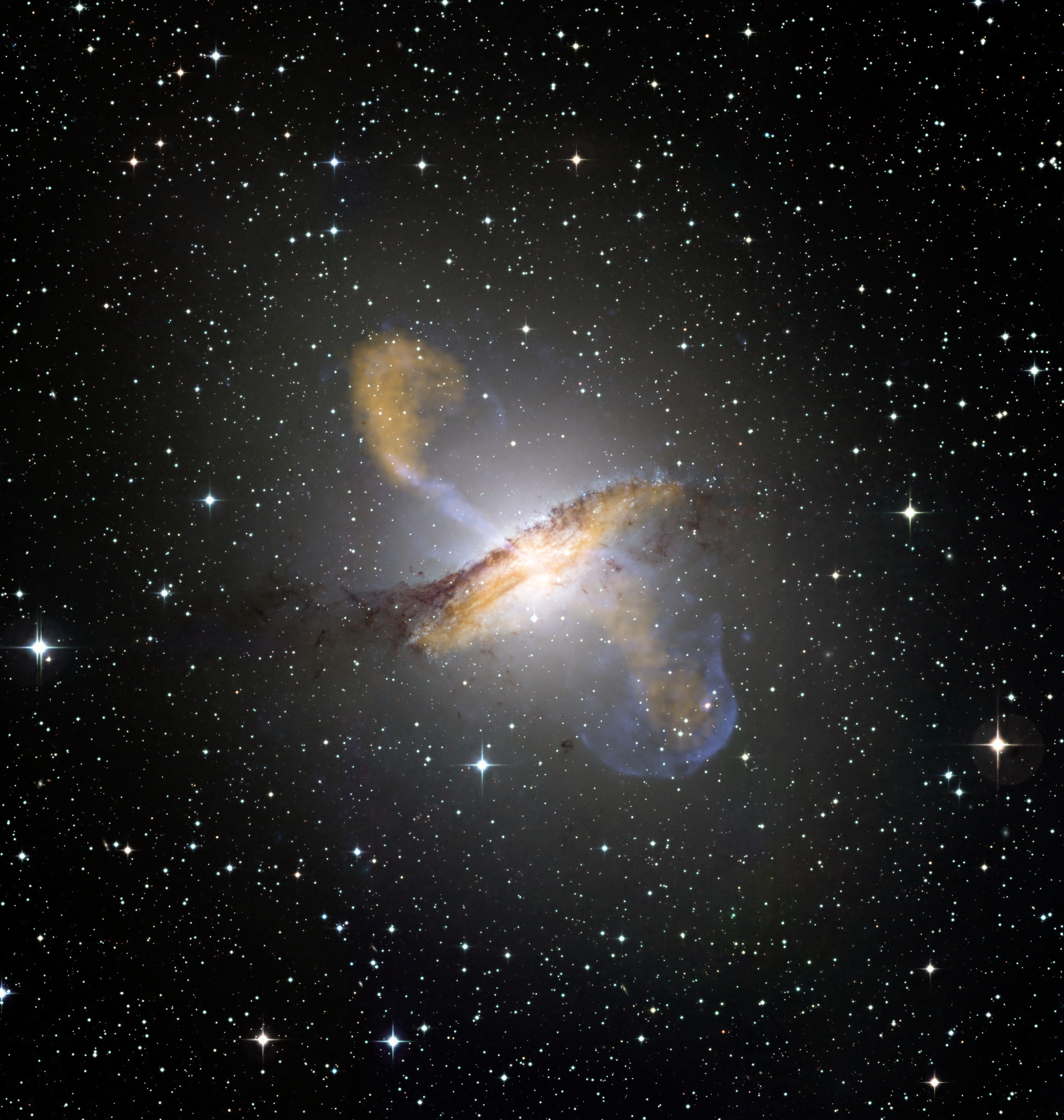
Centaurus A, the closest BL Lac object to the Milky Way.

Soon after the discovery of this unusual class of objects it was noted that the sources were surrounded by a faint nebulosity. In the late 1970s the use of modern detectors (such as CCD) allowed observers to probe with better accuracy the nature of the nebulosity. First images of the BL Lac object PKS 0548-322 by Michael John Disney in 1974 in various filters found it to be composed by a giant elliptical galaxy with a bright nucleus.

Extensive surveys taken with the Hubble Space Telescope of 132 BL Lac objects comprising seven complete radio, X-ray, and optically selected samples in 2000 studied the morphologies of possible BL Lac host galaxies. The data concluded that in two-thirds of the BLL images taken, host galaxies are detected, including in nearly all with redshift z < 0.5. BL Lac objects are luminous enough that only one quarter (6/22) of the images taken with z > 0.5 were resolved because of relatively short exposure times. A de Vaucouleurs profile $I(R)\propto R^\frac14$ looks to be a significantly preferred brightness profile for 58 of the 72 resolved host galaxies at over ~99% confidence. The results of this survey conclude that there is an 8% limit to the number of disk systems in BL Lac objects and is therefore consistent with the assumption that all BL Lac host galaxies could be elliptical. These ellipticals are very luminous with a median absolute K-corrected magnitude of $M_R\thicksim-23.7\pm-0.6$ mag (rms dispersion). This is comparable to the brightest cluster galaxies.

== History ==
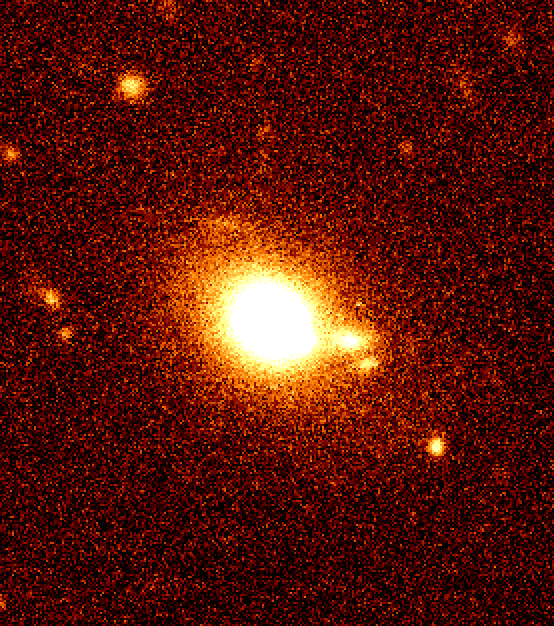
The BL Lac object H 0323+022 (z=0.147) imaged at ESO NTT (R filter). The host galaxy and close companions are visible.

John L. Schmitt first noticed the peculiar nature of BL Lac in 1968 when he matched it with a radio object, VRO 42.22.01.

Within a year others observed that the radio flux varied, and that light was polarized. Peter Albert Strittmatter proposed the class of object in 1972 and added four objects. By 1976 there were 30 known objects.

In 2017, a very high energy neutrino was detected by the IceCube project apparently coming from BL Lac object TXS 0506+056.
