= BL Lacertae =

Active galaxy in the constellation Lacerta

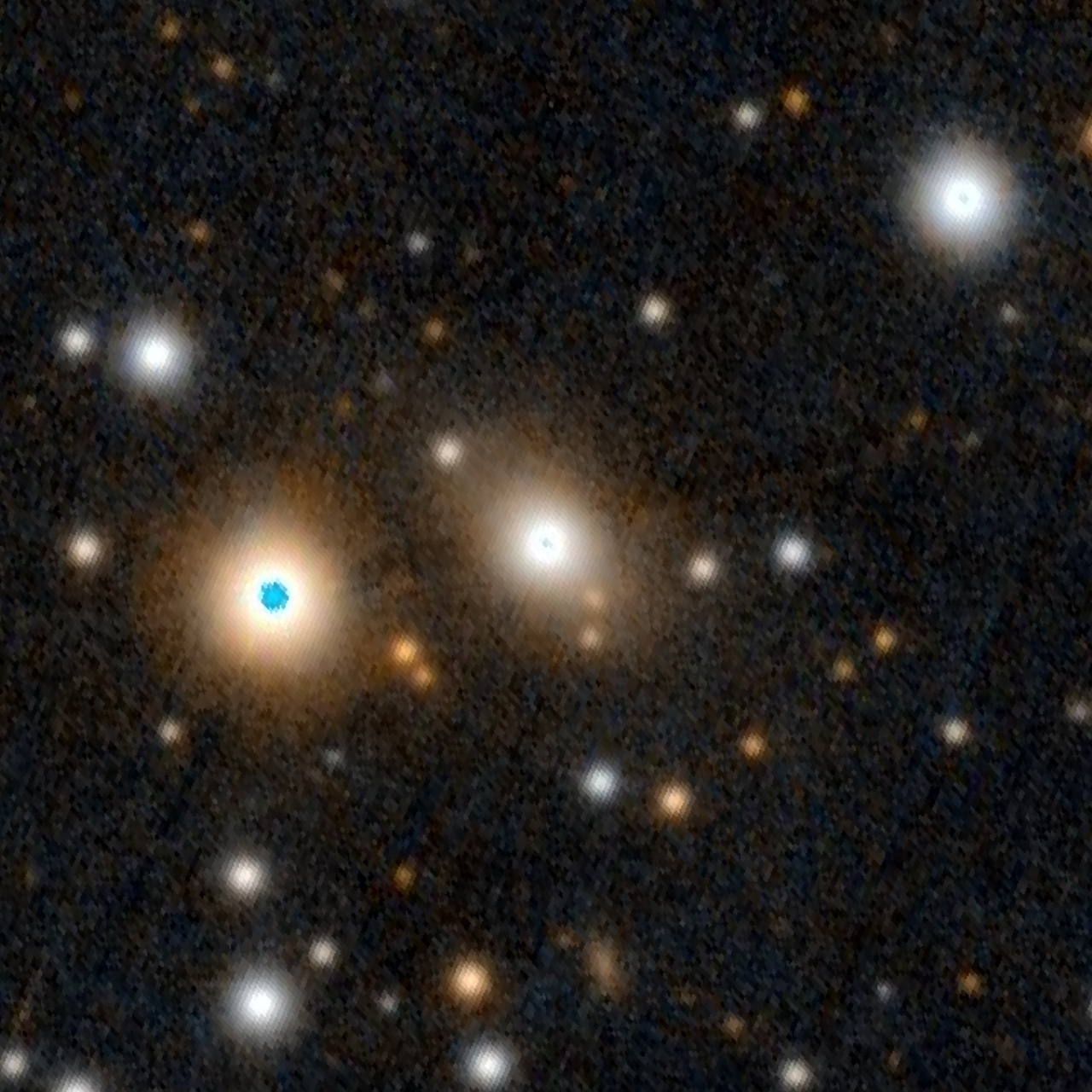
- The active galaxy BL Lacertae (center), from the Pan-STARRS Data Release 1. The bright object at the left is a foreground star within the Milky Way. Green pixels are artifacts due to data processing.

Observation data (Epoch J2000)
- Constellation: Lacerta
- Right ascension: 22^{h} 02^{m} 43.3^{s}
- Declination: +42° 16′ 40″
- Redshift: 0.07
- Distance: 0.9 Gly (0.276 Gpc)
- Type: BL Lac
- Apparent magnitude (V): var. ~14 to ~17

Other designations
- OY+401, VR 42.22.01

BL Lacertae or BL Lac is a highly variable, extragalactic active galactic nucleus (AGN or active galaxy). It was first discovered by Cuno Hoffmeister in 1929, but was originally thought to be an irregular variable star in the Milky Way galaxy and so was given a variable star designation. In 1968, the "star" was identified by John Schmitt at the David Dunlap Observatory as a bright, variable radio source. A faint trace of a host galaxy was also found. In 1974, Oke and Gunn measured the redshift of BL Lacertae as z = 0.07, corresponding to a recession velocity of 21,000 km/s with respect to the Milky Way. The redshift figure implies that the object lies at a distance of 900 million light years.

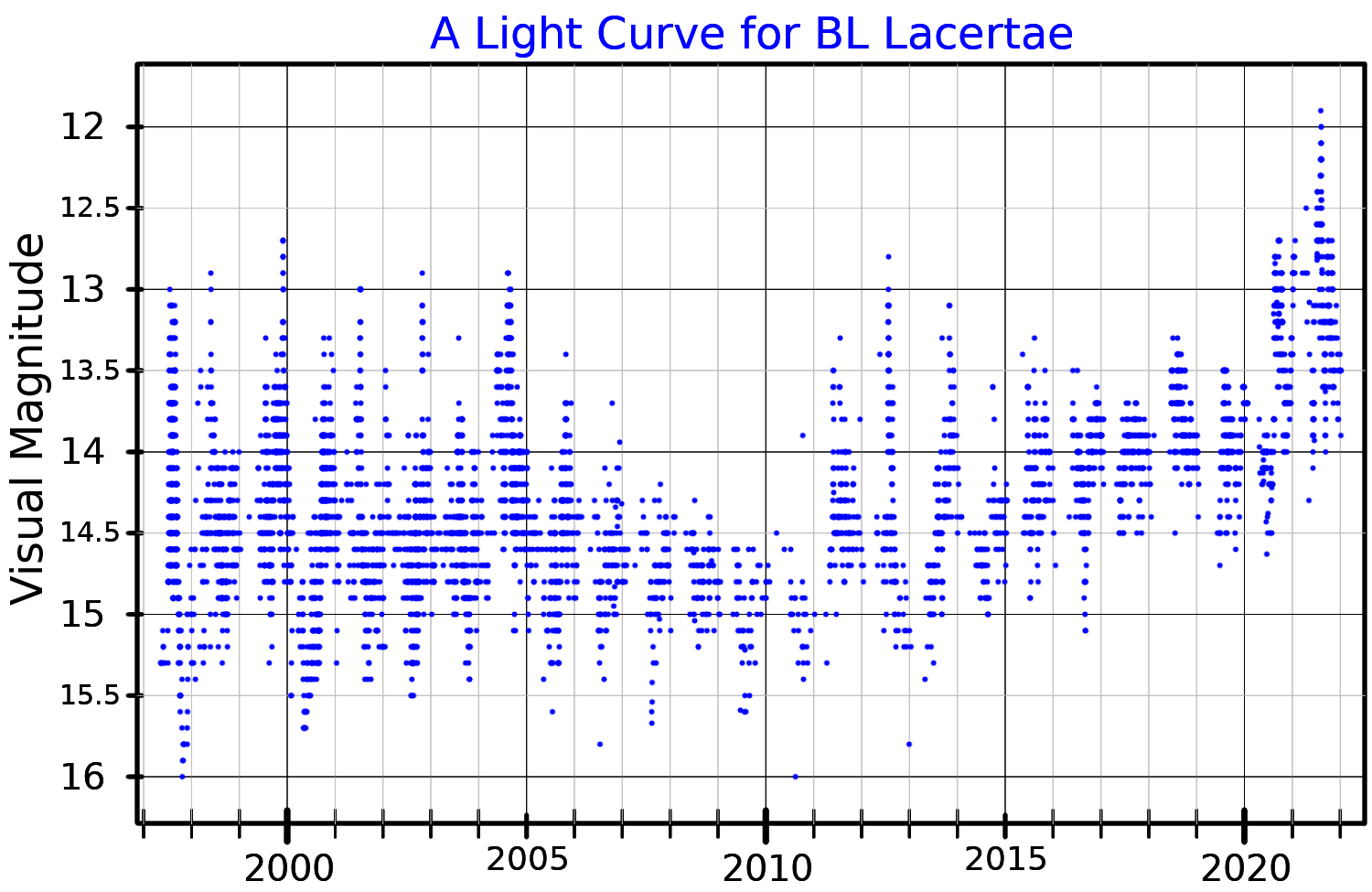
A visual band light curve for BL Lacertae, plotted from AAVSO data

Due to its early discovery, BL Lacertae became the prototype and namesake of the class of active galactic nuclei known as "BL Lacertae objects" or "BL Lac objects". This class is distinguished by rapid and high-amplitude brightness variations and by optical spectra devoid (or nearly devoid) of the broad emission lines characteristic of quasars. These characteristics are understood to result from relativistic beaming of emission from a jet of plasma ejected from the vicinity of a supermassive black hole. BL Lac objects are also categorized as a type of blazar.

BL Lacertae changes in apparent magnitude over fairly small time periods, typically between values of 14 and 17. In January 2021, it exhibited extreme flaring behavior and was reported to reach magnitude 11.45 in the R filter band.
