= Flat-spectrum radio quasar =

Type of highly variable quasar or subtype of blazar

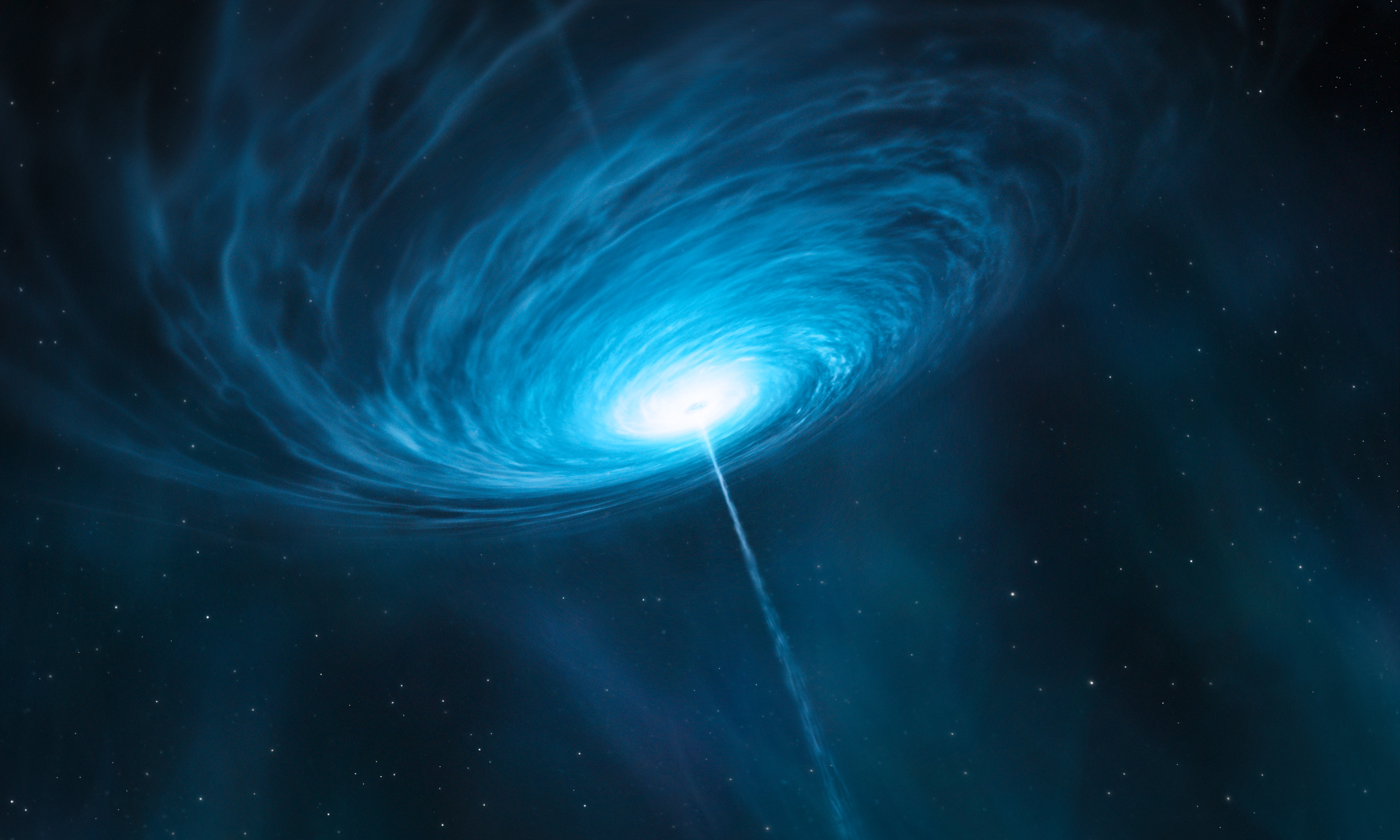
Artist's impression of the optically violent variable quasar 3C 279.

A flat-spectrum radio quasar, also known as a optically violent variable quasar or OVV quasar, is a type of highly variable quasar. It is a subtype of blazar that consists of a few rare, bright radio galaxies, whose visible light output can change by 50% in a day. OVV quasars have essentially become unified with highly polarized quasars (HPQ), core-dominated quasars (CDQ), and flat-spectrum radio quasars (FSRQ). At visible wavelengths, they are similar in appearance to BL Lac objects but generally have stronger broad emission lines.

Different terms are used, but the term FSRQ is gaining popularity, effectively making the other terms archaic. The term FSRQ comes from the distinction between steep spectrum and flat spectrum radio-loud quasars, based on the overall shape of their radio continuum (after disregarding emission features).

== Examples ==
- 3C 279
- S5 0014+81
