= Blueberry galaxy =

Type of starburst galaxy

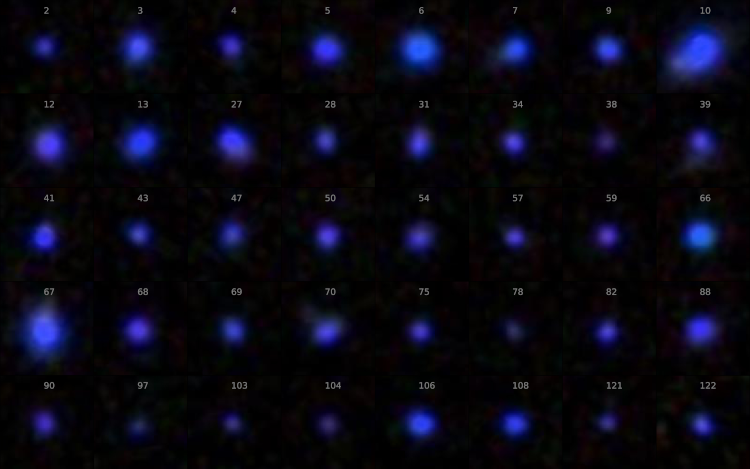
A combined image of 40 Blueberry galaxies. Credit: SDSS and Yang et al.

Blueberry galaxies (BBs) are dwarf starburst galaxies that have very high ionization rates and some of the lowest stellar masses and metallicities. They are smaller counterparts of Green Pea galaxies (GPs), but

- are more compact being less than 1/3000th the size of the Milky Way,
- are less distant, existing in low-density environments that are within the local universe, and
- have lower luminosities. BBs form one of the youngest classes of star-forming galaxies with median ages ~70 Myr. Two BBs are among the most metal-poor galaxies known within the local universe.

BBs were first named in the scientific literature by Yang et al. (2017) as GPs that were at a distance of redshift z=0.05 or less, although similar galaxies had originally been named BBs on the Galaxy Zoo website. While Yang et al. identified a sample of 40 BBs, a much larger sample was acquired using data from the LAMOST DR9 survey. Liu et al. found 270 BBs, as well as GPs and "Purple Grapes". Researchers undertook a systematic study of the star formation rates, metallicities and environments of the compact galaxies that have different colours because of the different positions of emission lines in the photometric bands.

BBs at redshift z < 0.05 have the [O III] λ5007 emission line within the g band, which makes their colors blue; purple grapes are those at z > 0.36 with [O III]λ5007 within the i band and the UV continuum redshifted to the g band (typically redshift 0.05 ≤ z < 0.112); GPs are in the redshift range of 0.112 < z < 0.36 and have the [O III]λ5007 line within the r band.

== Comparison to high-redshift galaxies ==
BBs, or "peas of various colours", have recently been studied as analogs for high-redshift galaxies that have been observed by the James Webb Space Telescope (JWST) (e.g.). Three examples of this are:

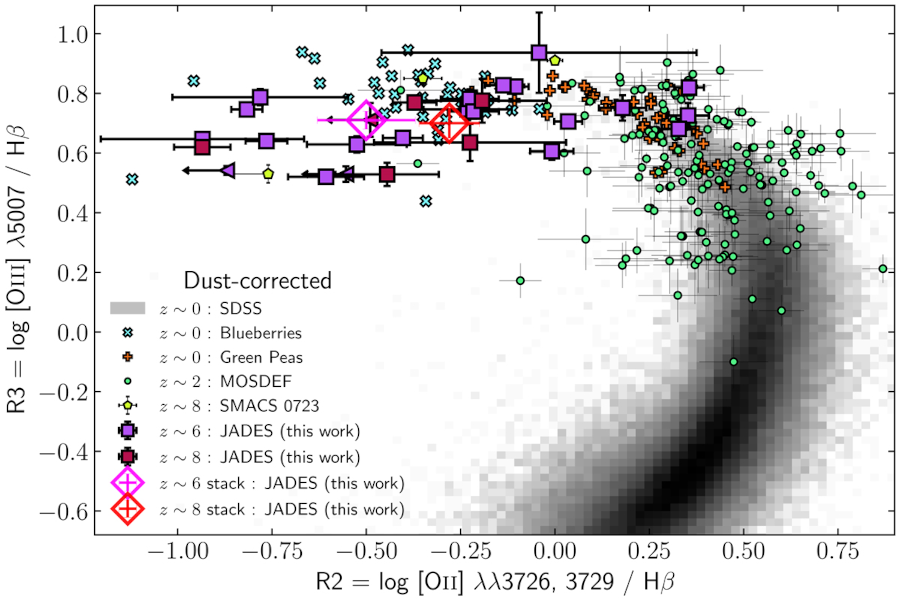
Emission line ratios diagram showing two JADES sub-samples at redshifts z ~ 6 and z ~ 8. Credit: JWST and Cameron et al.

- "JADES: Probing interstellar medium conditions at z ~ 5.5–9.5 with ultra-deep JWST/NIRSpec spectroscopy" (diagram top right) examines 27 galaxies at high redshifts that were observed with JWST/NIRSpec. The study measured various emission lines from the ultra-deep JADES survey so as to gauge the ratios between the chemicals identified and categorise them into groupings, or 'spaces'. BBs are identified as local analogs to these JADES galaxies, along with GPs, as they have "extreme properties" such as metallicity, low mass and very high ionization. They find that "galaxies in this sample occupy regions of line-ratio space that are offset from those inhabited by typical galaxies at z ~ 0 or z ~ 2, although generally aligned with more extreme low-redshift populations such as 'blueberry' and 'green pea' dwarf starbursts".
- In the study "Evolution of the Mass–Metallicity Relation from Redshift z ≈ 8 to the Local Universe" (Langeroodi et al. 2023), BBs and GPs are compared to a sample of 11 galaxies from JWST that are at redshift z ≈ 8. Using NIRCam and NIRSpec spectroscopy, metallicities and stellar masses are measured and then compared to extremely low metallicity analogs such as BBs. The study finds that the z ≈ 8 sample are generally distinct from extreme emission line galaxies or GPs but are similar in strong emission line ratios and metallicities to BBs. The study finds that BBs and GPs have metallicities similar to the z ≈ 8 galaxies, but "Despite this similarity, at a fixed stellar mass, the z ≈ 8 galaxies have systematically lower metallicities compared to BBs."

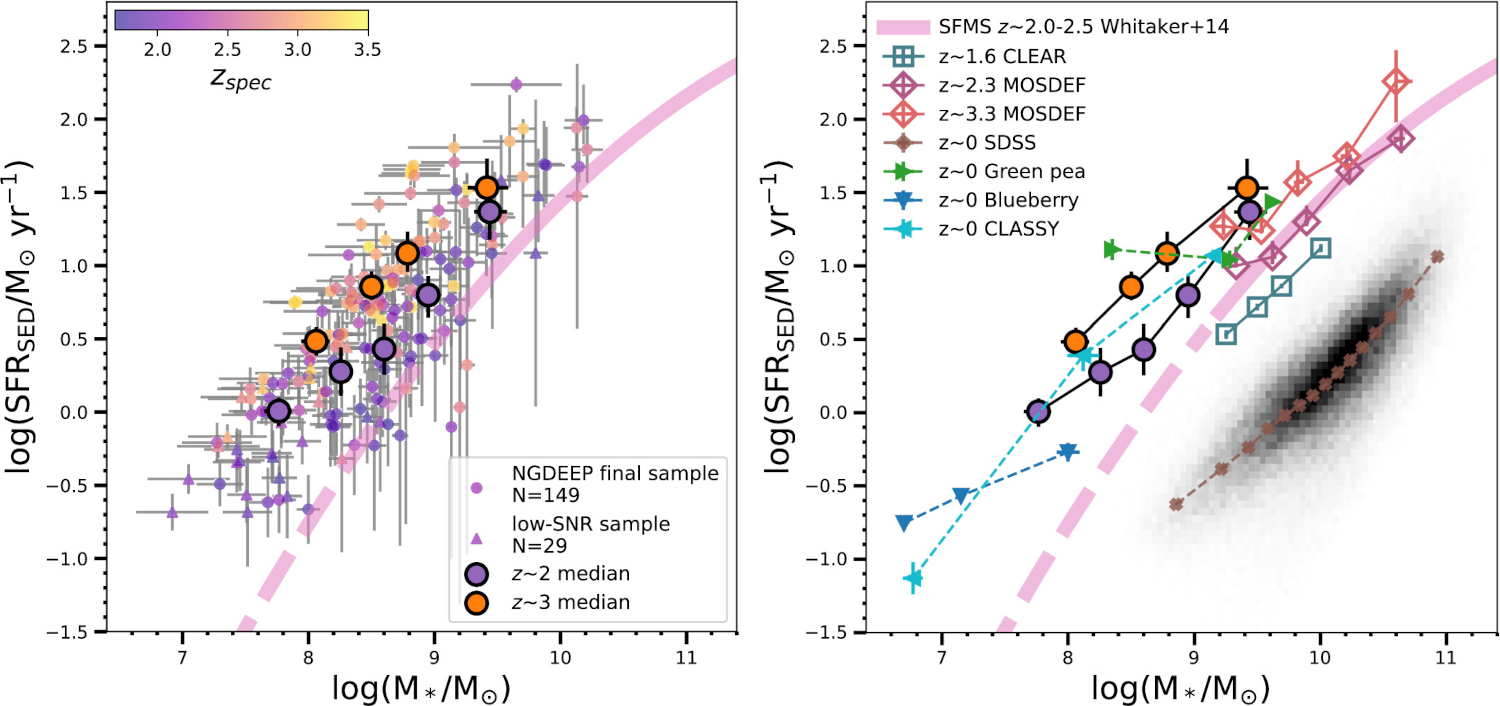
Left: The SFR vs. the stellar mass for galaxies in the NGDEEP final sample. Right: The SFR and stellar mass are shown for galaxies at various redshifts. Credit: Lu Shen et al. and JWST.

- The study "NGDEEP: The Star Formation and Ionization Properties of Galaxies at 1.7 < z < 3.4" (diagram bottom right) uses the JWST FGS-NIRISS from the Next Generation Deep Extragalactic Exploratory Public (NGDEEP) Survey to investigate a sample of 178 star-forming galaxies at redshifts 1.7 < z < 3.4. Using slitless spectroscopy, the authors select galaxies with ionizing oxygen and hydrogen emission features. BBs and GPs are used extensively as comparison galaxies at redshft z ~ 0 as they have strong emission lines "which may have properties more similar to those of high-redshift galaxies". As well as 36 BBs and 43 GPs, galaxies from SDSS and 45 from the Cosmic Origins Spectrograph Legacy Spectroscopic Survey (CLASSY) with similar redshifts are used all of which have ionized oxygen measurements. Among their results, they find that:
  - Galaxies with a redshift z ~ 2–3 have comparable or lower ionized oxygen ratios (O32) "to that measured for extreme galaxies at z ~ 0 at the fixed stellar mass, SFR, sSFR, and Hα and Hβ EW, indicating these extreme galaxies at z ~ 0 have similar to higher ionization parameters and similar to lower metallicity" and
  - The authors' NGDEEP sample spans a wide range of O32 and stellar masses, "which helps bridge the gap between the local and the z > 5 universe. We find an evolutionary trend in O32 and EW(Hβ) from z ~ 0 to z ~ 5, where higher redshift galaxies show increased O32 and EW, with possibly higher O32 at fixed EW."

== Further studies ==
In "X-ray observations of Blueberry galaxies" (Adamcová et al 2024) BBs are studied using the XMM-Newton space telescope. These observations are the first to use x-rays and deliver surprising results. Of the 7 BBs studied, only 2 were detected as having significant x-ray emissions, while the remaining 5 are considered under-luminous. One theory as to why this might be is that because the stellar population of BBs is very young and "hasn't yet evolved enough to produce binary systems with a normal star paired with a neutron star or black hole, which shine brightly in X-ray."

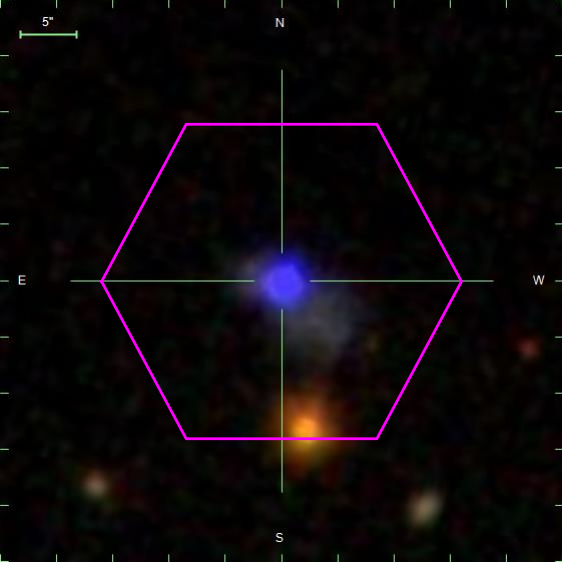
The galaxy SHOC 579 taken from the SDSS MaNGA survey (MaNGA ID- 8626−12704). Credit: SDSS.

A massive BB named SHOC 579 has been studied using the SDSS MaNGA survey by Paswan et al. (2022). Using data from MaNGA and a variety of sources such as GALEX and Spitzer, a BB next to an older disk-like structure is investigated. Both objects are at redshift z=~ 0.0472. Their conclusions (shortened & quoted) find that the BB is:

- is the most massive and metal-rich one for which we have direct observational evidence of an old stellar population,
- the age of the stellar population to be ~5 Gyr and ~7 Gyr for the blueberry component and the stellar disk, respectively,
- GPs and BBs generally and their extreme emission-line properties are likely due to recent strong starburst events, potentially triggered by an external gas accretion process,
- the presence of old stars imply that mechanisms that allow the escape of ionizing photons in these local objects may be different from those at play during the epoch of reionization.

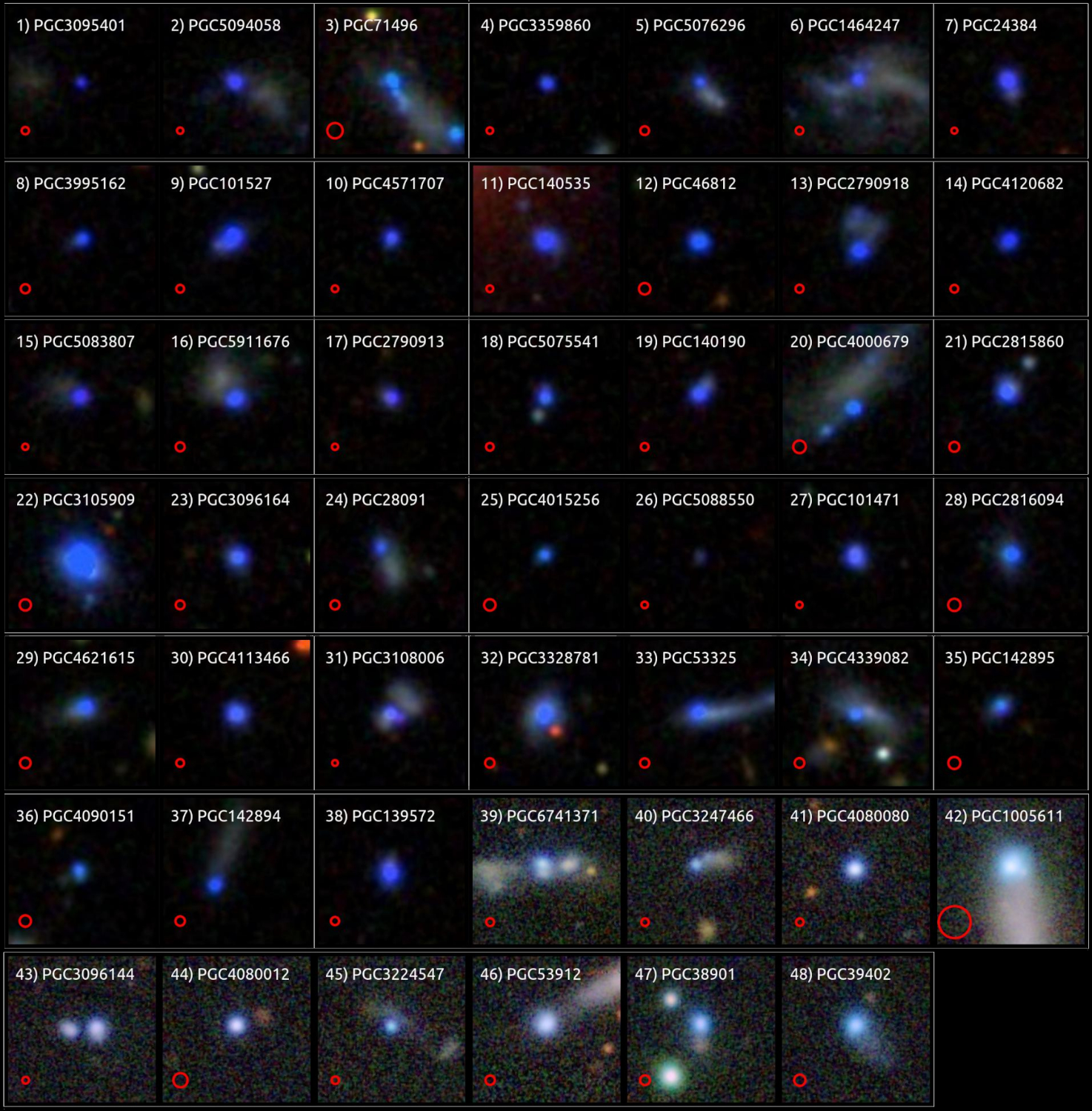
48 Blueberry galaxies from SDSS and Pan-STARRS. Credit: SDSS, Pan-STARRS, Kouroumpatzakis et al. 2024, R. Nowell.

In "FAST H I 21 cm Study of Blueberry Galaxies" (Chandola et al 2024) 28 BBs are studied using the Five-hundred-meter Aperture Spherical Telescope. The sample of BBs are observed over a 3 year period using FAST to measure the H I, or neutral hydrogen, using the 21 cm spectral line. By finding out the H I levels, the depletion rate of any H I 'reservoirs' can be deduced. Generally, the lower the stellar mass, the higher the amount of H I is present i.e. has not yet been used up in star formation. Two of the 28 are found to have these reservoirs and overall, only 7% of the 28 have an H I detection, which are lower values than those of main sequence galaxies.

The study "Blueberry galaxies up to 200 Mpc and their optical and infrared properties" (Kouroumpatzakis et al. 2024) analyses 48 BBs. Using data from the HECATE catalog, photometry from Pan-STARRS, SDSS and ALLWISE, and spectroscopy from MPA-JHU, 40 previously known BBs and 8 unknowns were identified. 14 of the 48 were from the less-studied southern hemisphere. They conclude that BBs are the most intensely starforming sources among dwarf galaxies in the local universe. They are less massive, more blue in visible light and redder in the infrared. BBs "have higher specific starformation rates, equivalent widths, lower metallicities, and the most strongly ionized interstellar medium compared to typical SFGs and GPs."

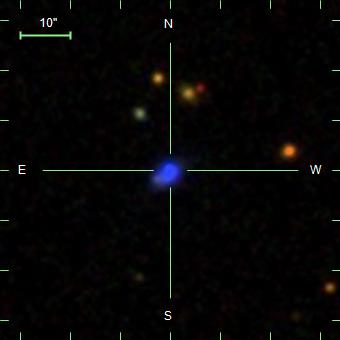
Blueberry galaxy J1509+3731. Credit: SDSS.

In "H I imaging of a Blueberry galaxy suggests a merger origin" (Dutta et al. 2024) a BB is observed with the Giant Metrewave Radio Telescope (GMRT). H I is detected in the BB J1509+3731, which is at redshift z = 0.03259 (image shown right), The H I is found to have a depletion time of 0.2 Gyr which indicates a high star formation rate than comparable standard blue compact galaxies. Combining the radio observations with images from the DESI Legacy Survey, it is shown that there is an H I offset outside the optical boundaries as seen on the DESI image. They conclude that "such an offset could be a sign of a merger event which can also trigger a starburst" and that, combined with other studies, this highlights "the role of dwarf galaxy mergers in the leakage of ionizing photons, and thus their role in cosmic reionization ".

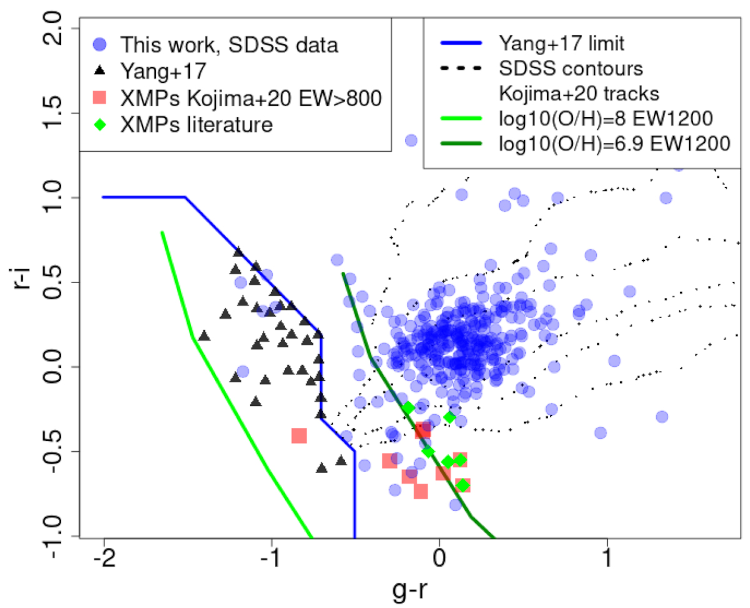
A broadband color-color diagram from Lumbreras-Calle et al. (2022) created using SDSS data. Credit: Lumbreras-Calle and J-PLUS.

"Radio Continuum Emission from Local Analogs of High-z Faint LAEs: Blueberry Galaxies" (Sebastian et al. 2019) studies the radio continuum from BBs using the GMRT. The authors find that the star formation rate of BBs is suppressed by a factor of ~3 when compared to optical emissions lines and infer that this might be due to:

- the young ages of these galaxies or,
- the escape of cosmic ray electrons via diffusion or galactic scale outflows.

From the BBs sample in Yang et al. (2017), they select a subset of 10 of the brightest galaxies. Having captured the flux densities from 9 of these, they were combined with images from DECaLS showing how far the radio observations extended from the visible galaxies. After assuming that the stellar mass was built up from starburst activity, they calculate the time from the onset of this burst to within a range of 30 Myr to 370 Myr with a median of ~70 Myr. The emission of synchrotron radiation is found to be small and that it is plausible that the star formation in BBs has not been going on long enough for this to become a dominant force. They conclude: "In our study, we are not able to distinguish between the different scenarios that lead to the decrement in the radio continuum emission."

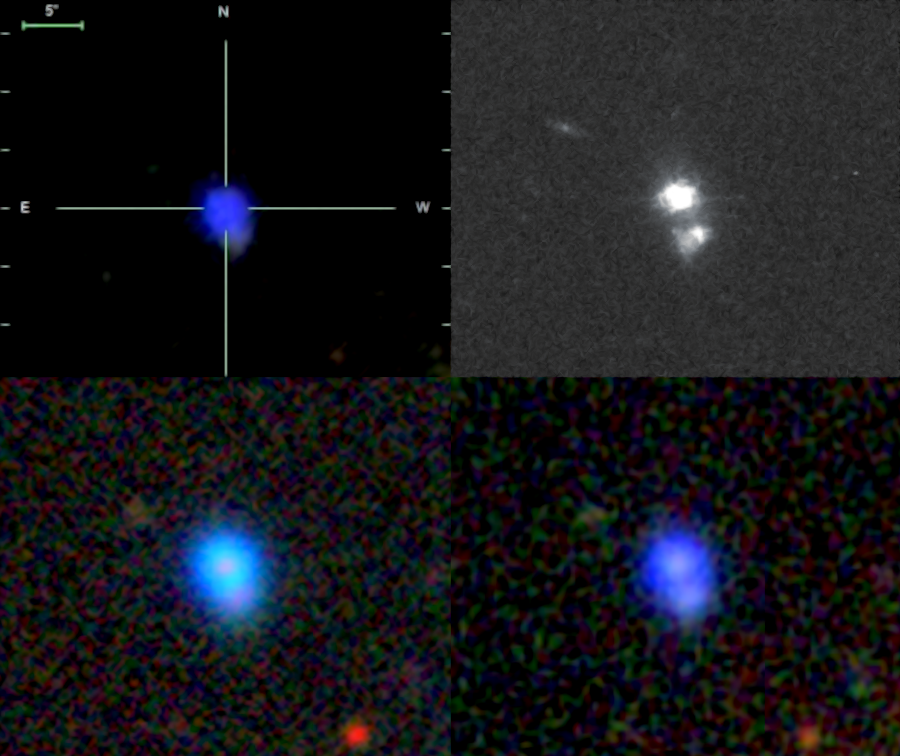
A composite of four images of the blueberry galaxy SDSS J0840+4707. Credit: SDSS, DECaLS, HST, R.Nowell.

A sample of Extreme Emission Line Galaxies (EELGs) was found by a survey detailed in "J-PLUS: Uncovering a large population of extreme [OIII] emitters in the local Universe". Using the Javalambre Photometric Local Universe Survey (J-PLUS) 466 EELGs at redshift z < 0.06 with [OIII] EW over 300 Å and an r-band magnitude below 20 were identified, of which 411 were previously unknown. Using additional data from WISE, Gaia and SDSS, a much fainter sample of galaxies was found than had previously been observed. Among the galaxy sample were BBs which resulted in a ten-fold increase in the density of BBs known. In the diagram on the right, it is shown that the "sample of EELGs covers the region of the Yang et al. (2017) blueberry galaxies (since they present extreme [OIII] emission at our redshift range), as expected, but it also covers the same color space as extremely metal-poor galaxies both from observations and models". Among the results, it was found that the EELGs had:

- low stellar masses
- very young ages
- moderately low metallicities
- exceptionally high [OIII] EW, all of which are typical of low-mass galaxies with high star formation activity.

The authors' sample was "much more efficient than searches made using broadband surveys, such as the blueberry galaxies (Yang et al. 2017) or the green peas (Cardamone et al. 2009)". They conclude that the EELGs they identified share characteristics that make them similar to galaxies at high redshift and might help "shed light onto the properties of the galaxies forming in the very early Universe."

While many sources have identified GPs/BBs as analogs of early galaxies, several studies have identified the presence of an older stellar population within some examples, something that could not have been possible in the early universe.

== Different terminologies ==
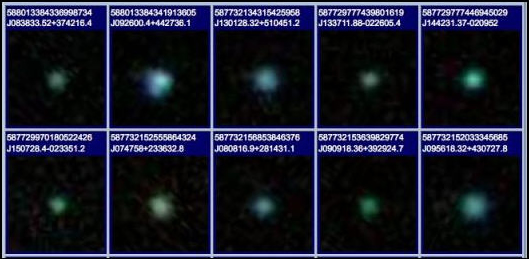
A selection of 10 Green Pea galaxies. Credit: C. Cardamone and R. Nowell.

While some authors continue to name these blue low-redshift compact starforming galaxies as BBs, some have broadened the original criteria for GPs and, perhaps confusingly, call BBs as GPs. An example of this is the study "New Insights on Lyα and Lyman Continuum Radiative Transfer in the Greenest Peas" (Jaskot et al. 2019) in which blue objects at very low redshifts are named as GPs . In this study, 13 blue and green galaxies at various redshifts are observed using the Hubble Space Telescope Cosmic Origins Spectrograph (COS) from which spectra are produced. The authors seek the levels of the ionizing Lyman continuum photons which might be important when considering the epoch of reionization in the early universe.

In a 2011 study, Izotov et al. classified BBs as 'Luminous Compact Galaxies' but did not refer to them by name, stating that blue, purple and green Pea galaxies were the same type of object at distances between redshifts z=~0.02 to ~0.63.

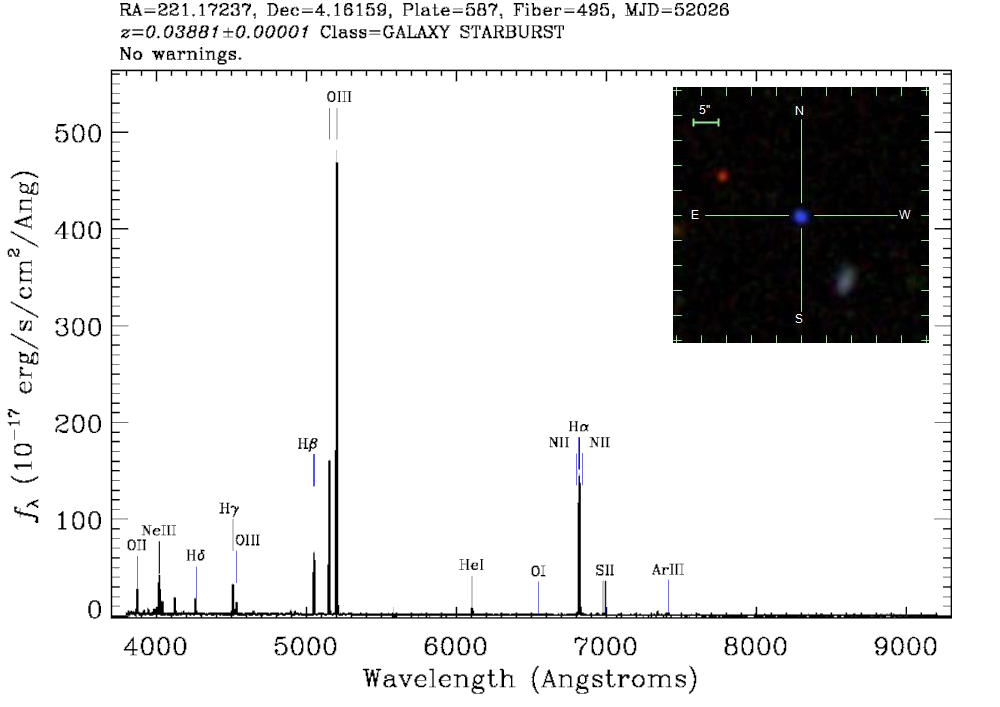
Blueberry galaxy SDSS J144441.37+040941.7 image & spectrum combined. Spectrum shows high ionized oxygen levels [OIII} and elements that include helium, sulphur, neon and argon. From Yang et al. 2017. Credit: SDSS and R. Nowell.

In the publication: "Proceedings of the conference 'The Interplay between Local and Global Processes in Galaxies', Cozumel, Mexico, 2016-4" (Hidalgo-Gámez et al. 2017a ), the authors in an accompanying presentation call galaxies similar to BBs 'Blue marbles' or purple Pea galaxies 'Purple marbles'. They state: "Although some authors have concluded that all three are the same kind of galaxies, we have studied them carefully and found out that there are important differences among the properties, including the scaling relations."

"Chemical Abundances of a Sample of Oxygen-dominated Galaxies" (Miranda-Pérez et al. 2023) seeks to determine the chemical abundances of 88 Extreme Emission Line Galaxies by spectroscopy. The sample of 88 compact, oxygen-dominated galaxies were taken from SDSS DR7 and were selected because of their large equivalent width of [O III]λ5007 (more than 200 Å). The authors determined oxygen, nitrogen, sulphur, neon, argon, iron and chlorine levels and found a mean metallicity of 12 + log(O/H) ≈ 8. Their sample contained objects that they placed into 3 colour sets: 23 blue, 29 purple and 36 green. The galaxies were those colours because of where the strong [OIII] emission line fell in the SDSS spectrum according to redshift of the object: blue nearby, then purple with green the furthest away at redshift z < 0.35. 12% of the galaxies were found to Extremely Metal Poor (XMP). It became clear that "that there is a lack of evolution in the chemical abundance for all the elements for such a long time, about 4.6 Gyr" while "it is expected that galaxies at high redshift might have lower metallicities".

See also "Chemical abundances of a sample of coloured galaxies" (Hidalgo-Gámez et al. 2017b), and "Coloured galaxies" (Hidalgo-Gámez et al. 2019) presentation at "Small Galaxies, Cosmic Questions", Durham University.

== Purple pea galaxies ==
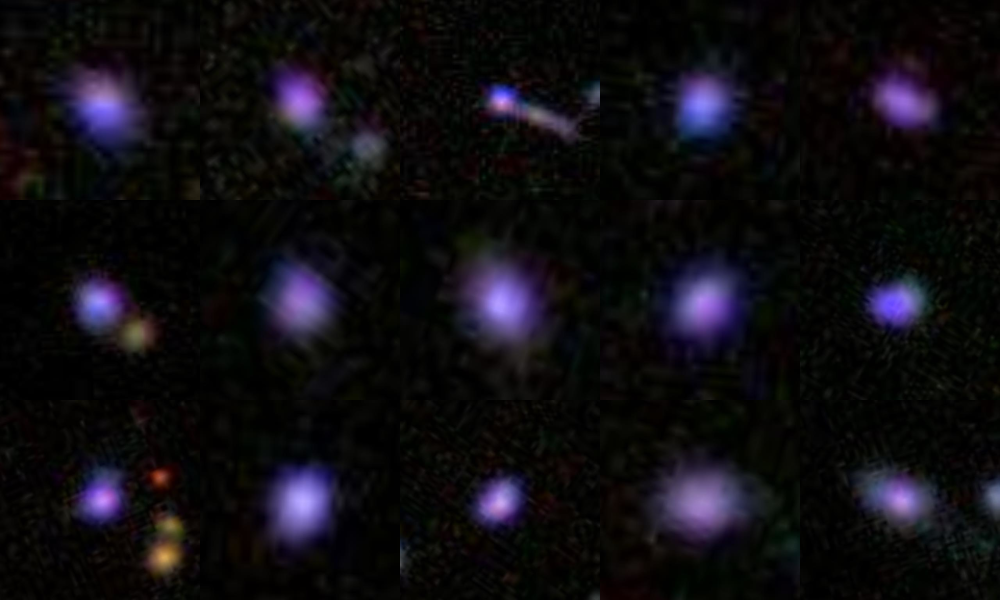
A composite of 15 Purple Pea galaxies with images taken from SDSS DR7 Explorer. Credit: SDSS and R. Nowell

Purple Pea galaxies (PPs) are counterparts of Green Pea galaxies and Blueberry galaxies, often being termed 'Purple Grapes'. The PPs sample shown in the image to the right has 15 dwarf starburst galaxies and was taken from a list on the Galaxy Zoo website. As in other samples, these PPs are at a distance of redshift 0.05 ≤ z < 0.112 which places them about halfway in distance between GPs and BBs. The 24 galaxies named 'Purple marbles' in Hidalgo-Gámez et al. 2017a are at an average distance of redshift z = 0.09 and so fall within the range of PPs.

== Little blue dots ==
The study "Little Blue Dots in the Hubble Space Telescope Frontier Fields: Precursors to Globular Clusters?" (Elmegreen et al. 2017) examines images from the HST Frontier Fields Parallels, finding galaxies they name as Little Blue Dots (LBDs). When compared to BBs, LBDs are less massive and have a higher specific star formation rate, suggesting that their entire stellar mass has formed in only 1% of the local age of the universe. They are considered to be low-mass analogs of BBs. The authors find 55 LBDs between redshifts z=~0.73 and ~4.09 that appear as different colour objects because of their distance. They suggest that "objects like this are the long-sought progenitors of low-metallicity globular clusters, which formed in dwarf galaxies and were assimilated into the halos of today's spirals and ellipticals."

== See also ==
- Citizen science
- Galaxy formation and evolution
- Faint blue galaxy
- Gems of the Galaxy Zoos
- Haro 11
- Irregular galaxy
- Little red dot (galaxy)
- Lyman-alpha forest
