= NGC 1850 =

Super star cluster in the constellation Dorado

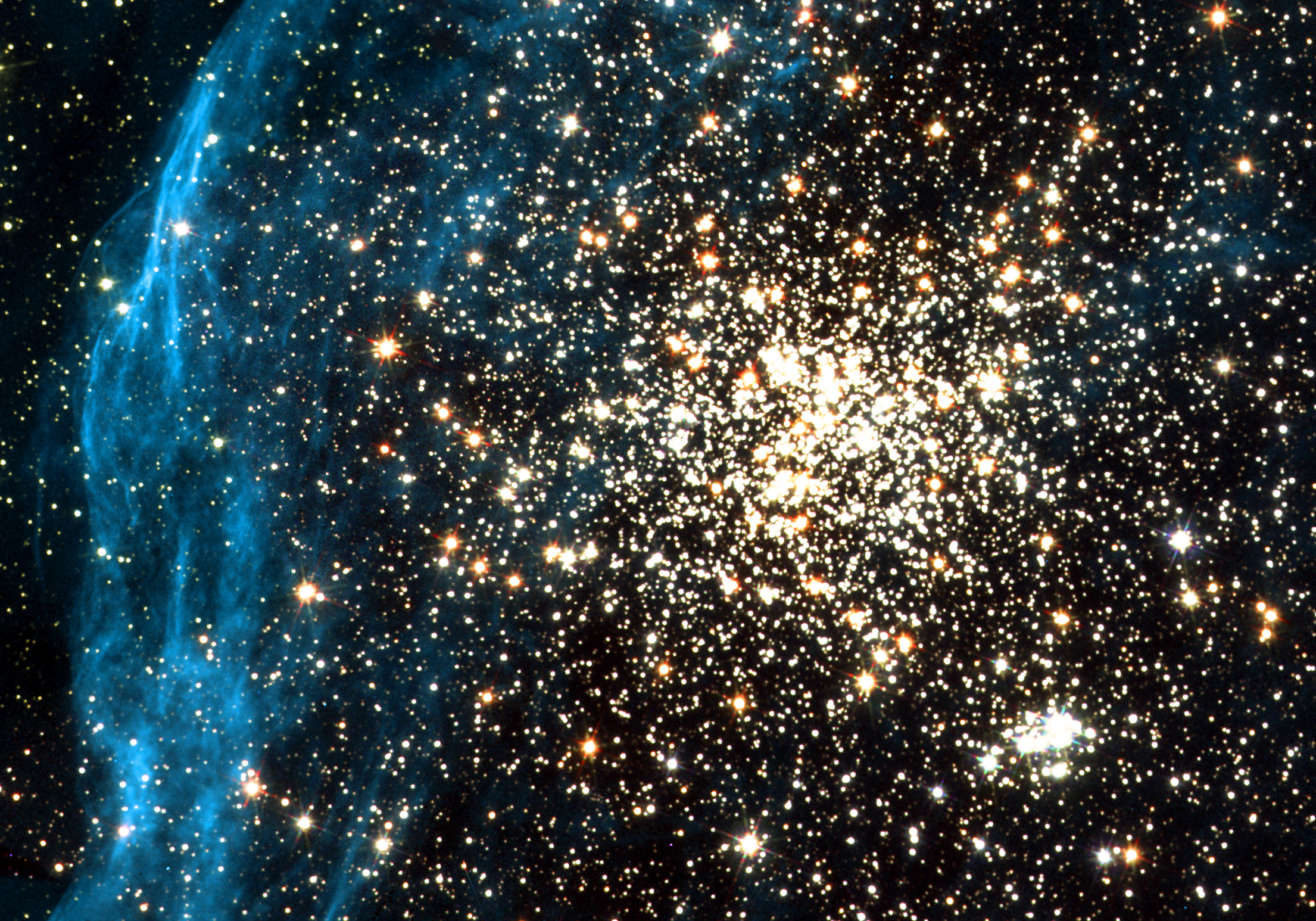
- A Hubble Space Telescope (HST) image of NGC 1850.

Observation data (J2000.0 epoch)
- Constellation: Dorado
- Right ascension: 05^{h} 08^{m} 50.190^{s}
- Declination: −68° 45′ 35.65″
- Apparent magnitude (V): 9.0
- Apparent dimensions (V): 3.4′

Physical characteristics
- Mass: 41,700+10,800 −8,600 M_{☉}
- Radius: 16.2 ± 1.1 ly (4.97 ± 0.35 pc)
- Tidal radius: 9.82 ± 0.39 ly (3.01 ± 0.12 pc)
- $\begin{smallmatrix}\left[\ce{M}/\ce{H}\right]\end{smallmatrix}$ = −0.3 dex
- Estimated age: ~100 Myr
- Other designations: NGC 1850, ESO 056-SC070, h 2780, GC 1060

NGC 1850 is a double cluster and a super star cluster in the constellation Dorado, located in the northwest part of the bar of the Large Magellanic Cloud, at a distance of 168 kly (51.5 kpc) from the Sun. It was discovered by Scottish astronomer James Dunlop in 1826.

This is an unusual cluster system because the main distribution of stars is like a globular cluster, but unlike the globular clusters of the Milky Way it is composed of young stars. The only similar object in the Milky Way is Westerlund 1. The main cluster has the appearance of a globular cluster with an age of 50±10 Myr. The second is a more loosely distributed sub-cluster with an age of 4.3±0.9 Myr, located at an angular separation of 30″ to the west of the main cluster. There are indications of interactions between the two, with the larger component being irregular and showing a tail toward the northwest.

The main cluster is around 100 million years old, with a tidal radius of 10 light years and an overall radius of 16 light years. It has an estimated mass of 42,000 times the mass of the Sun. The stellar component is split into two main sequence populations, with about a quarter of the stars in a blue (hotter) group and the rest in a redder (cooler) population. The cluster is embedded in an ionization region designated Henize 103.

The much younger subcluster, often designated NGC 1850A, contains a number of young, massive O/B-type stars that are on or near the main sequence, distributed up to 1′ from the central clump. Seven subcluster members have masses of ≥ 35 M_{☉}, and two of those are ≥ 50 M_{☉}. Lower mass members up to ~3 M_{☉} are still on the pre-main-sequence stage. The age distribution of the subcluster members indicate star formation has been active almost constantly since its formation. The eastern side of the cluster is more obscured and has fewer OB stars.

In November 2021, astronomers using MUSE on the Very Large Telescope reported the discovery of a stellar-mass black hole in NGC 1850, NGC 1850 BH1, by viewing its influence on the motion of a star in close proximity. This was the first direct dynamical detection of a black hole in a young massive cluster.

== Gallery ==
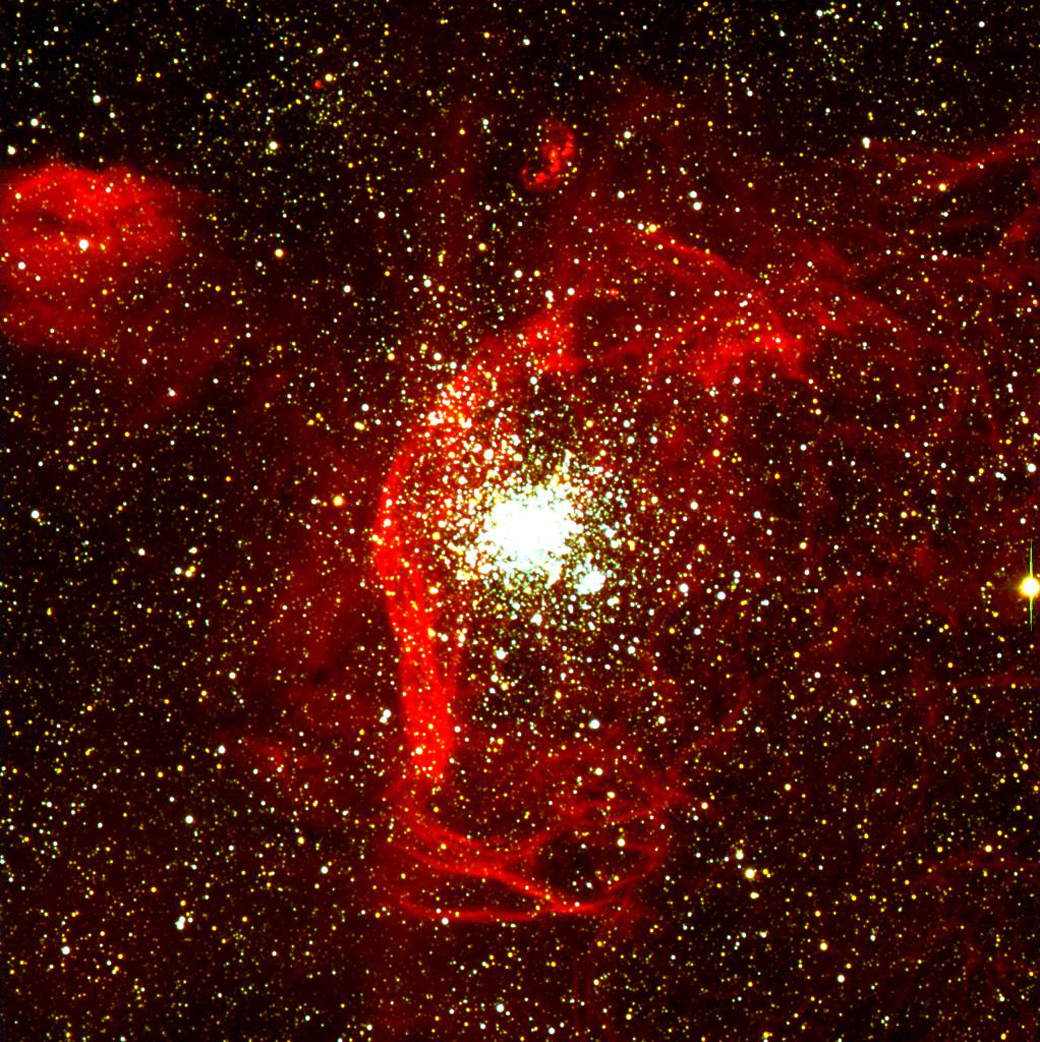
ESO image of NGC 1850 showing the stellar cluster and surrounding nebulosity
