= Irregular galaxy =

Class of galaxy

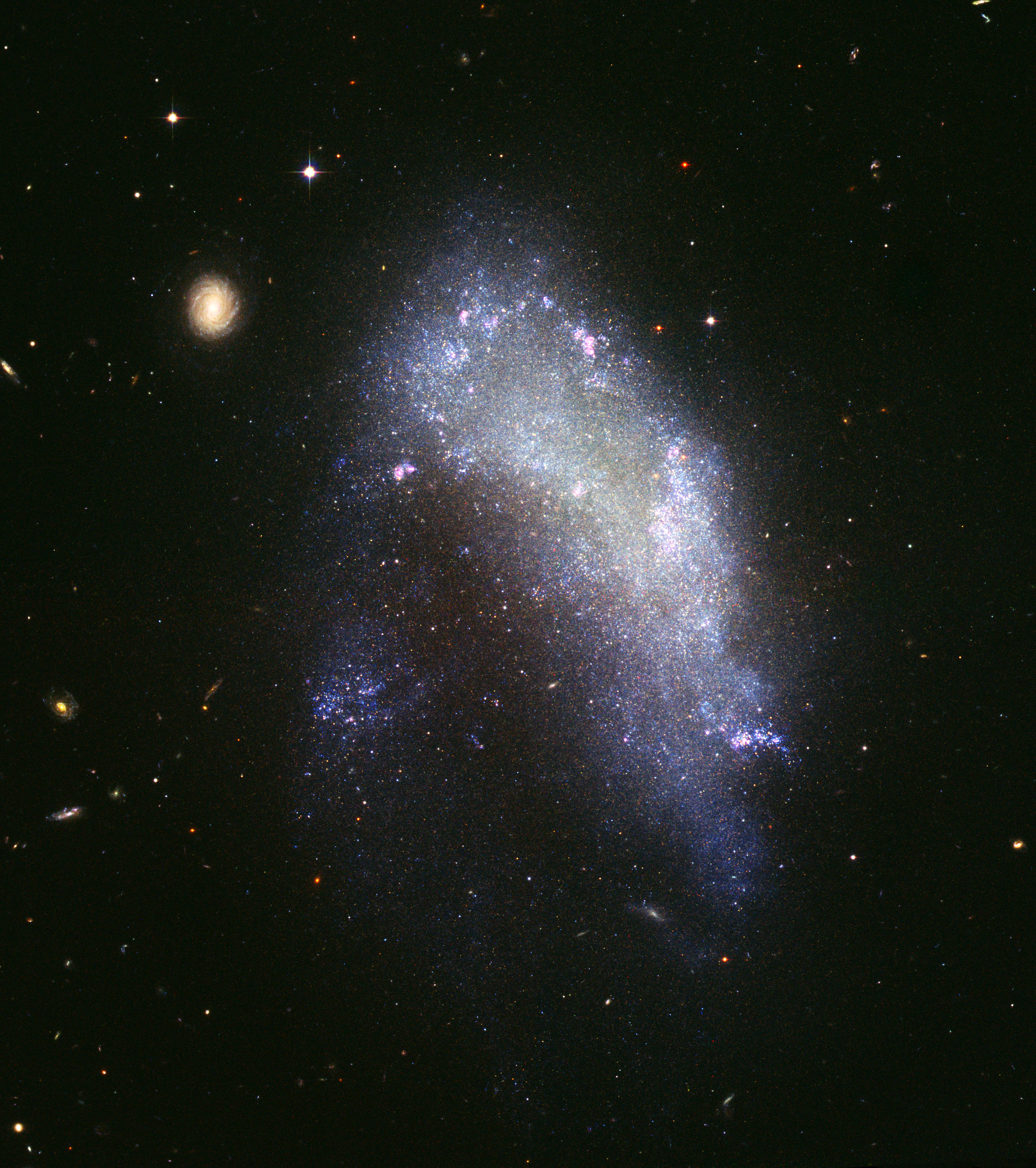
NGC 1427A, an example of an irregular galaxy, is an Irr-I category galaxy about 52 Mly distant.

An irregular galaxy is a galaxy that does not have a distinct regular shape, unlike a spiral or an elliptical galaxy. Irregular galaxies do not fall into any of the regular classes of the Hubble sequence, and they are often chaotic in appearance, with neither a nuclear bulge nor any trace of spiral arm structure. Other galaxies have an axis of symmetry for their blue-light distribution, which cannot be found in the sporadic organization of irregular galaxies. This absence of structure in an irregular galaxy leads to little density waves in these galaxies. This makes irregular galaxies prime areas to study star formation without the effects of density waves.

Collectively they are thought to make up about a quarter of all galaxies. A large chunk of the Local Group is made up of irregular galaxies, most being distant and classified as dwarf irregulars. Irregulars are broken down into two more subcategories along with dwarf. Some irregular galaxies were once spiral or elliptical galaxies but were deformed by an uneven external gravitational force, or may be young galaxies between spiral and elliptical status. Irregular galaxies may contain abundant amounts of gas and dust. This is not necessarily true for dwarf irregulars. Irregular galaxies may also be formed in galaxy collisions.

Irregular galaxies are commonly small, about one tenth the mass of the Milky Way galaxy, though there are also unusual cases of large irregulars like UGC 6697. Due to their small sizes, they are prone to environmental effects like colliding with large galaxies and intergalactic clouds.

== Types ==
There are three major types of irregular galaxies:

- An Irr-I galaxy (Irr I) is an irregular galaxy that features some structure but not enough to place it cleanly into the Hubble sequence.
  - Subtypes with some spiral structure are called Sm galaxies
  - Subtypes without spiral structure are called Im galaxies.
- An Irr-II galaxy (Irr II) is an irregular galaxy that does not appear to feature any structure that can place it into the Hubble sequence, and is often shaped via collision or merger.

- A dI-galaxy (or dIrr) is a dwarf irregular galaxy. Irregular galaxies with luminosities below $10^8 L_\odot$ fall into the dwarf irregular galaxy category. This type of galaxy is now thought to be important to understand the overall evolution of galaxies, as they tend to have a low level of metallicity and relatively high levels of gas, and are thought to be similar to the earliest galaxies that populated the Universe. They may represent a local (and therefore more recent) version of the faint blue galaxies known to exist in deep field galaxy surveys. These types of irregular galaxies also have high amounts of dark matter.

Irregular galaxies are considered late-type along with spiral galaxies as opposed to early type elliptical galaxies.

Some of the irregular galaxies, especially of the Magellanic type, are small spiral galaxies that are being distorted by the gravity of a larger neighbor.

== Magellanic Clouds ==
The Magellanic Cloud galaxies were once classified as irregular galaxies. The Large Magellanic Cloud has since been re-classified as type SBm (barred Magellanic spiral). The Small Magellanic Cloud remains classified as an irregular galaxy of type Im under current galaxy morphological classification, although it does contain a bar structure.

== Star formation ==
Star formation in irregular galaxies is both common and varied, with some having rates comparable to spiral galaxies. The processes of star formation are the same as in other types of galaxies. However, the origins of star formation in irregular galaxies are perhaps more influenced by the random movement of gas, as well as the effects of massive stars and the unusually common giant HII regions on the interstellar medium. This is because they lack the density waves believed to contribute to star formation in spiral galaxies.

== Notable Examples ==
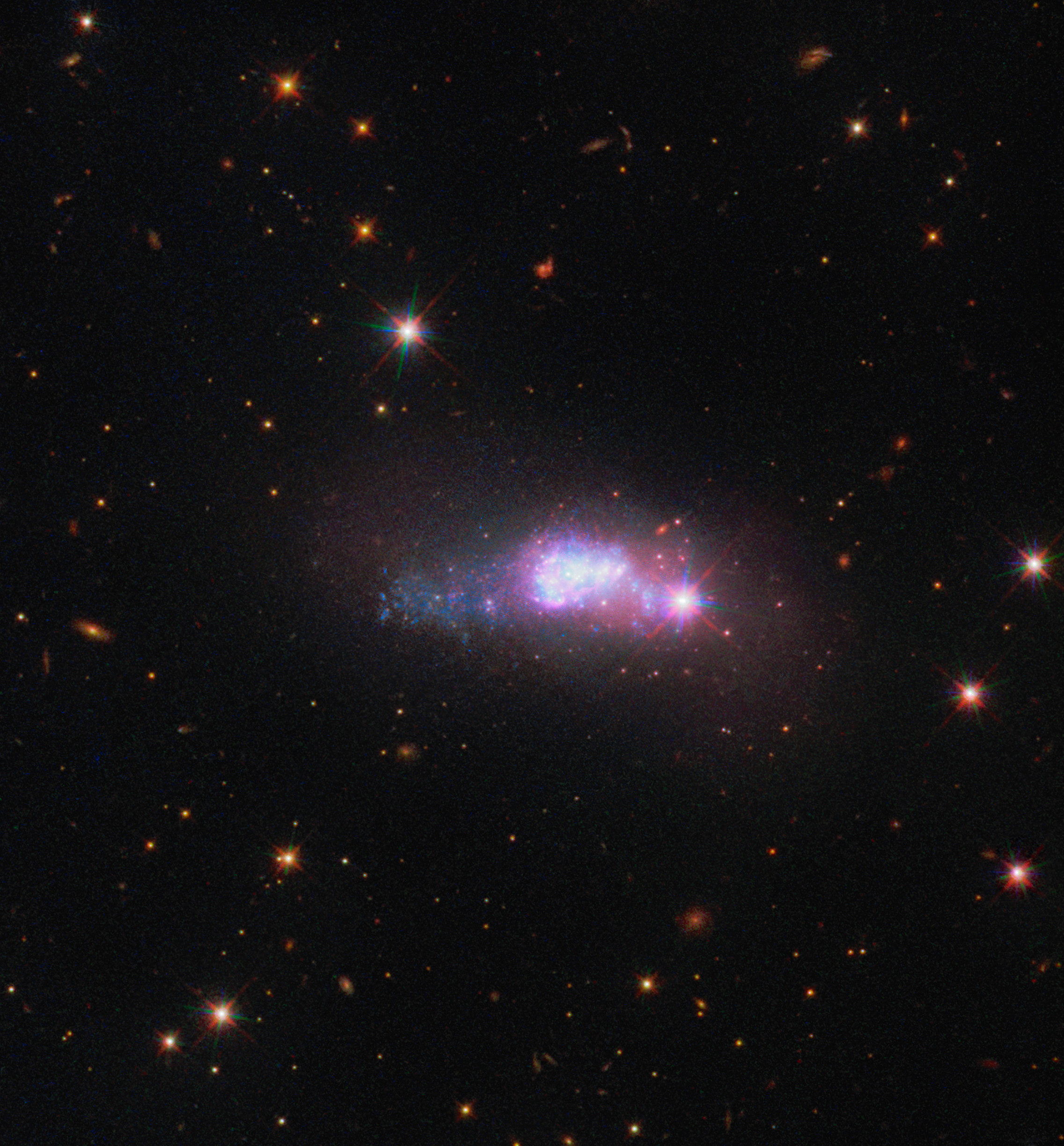
Blue compact dwarf galaxy ESO 338-4

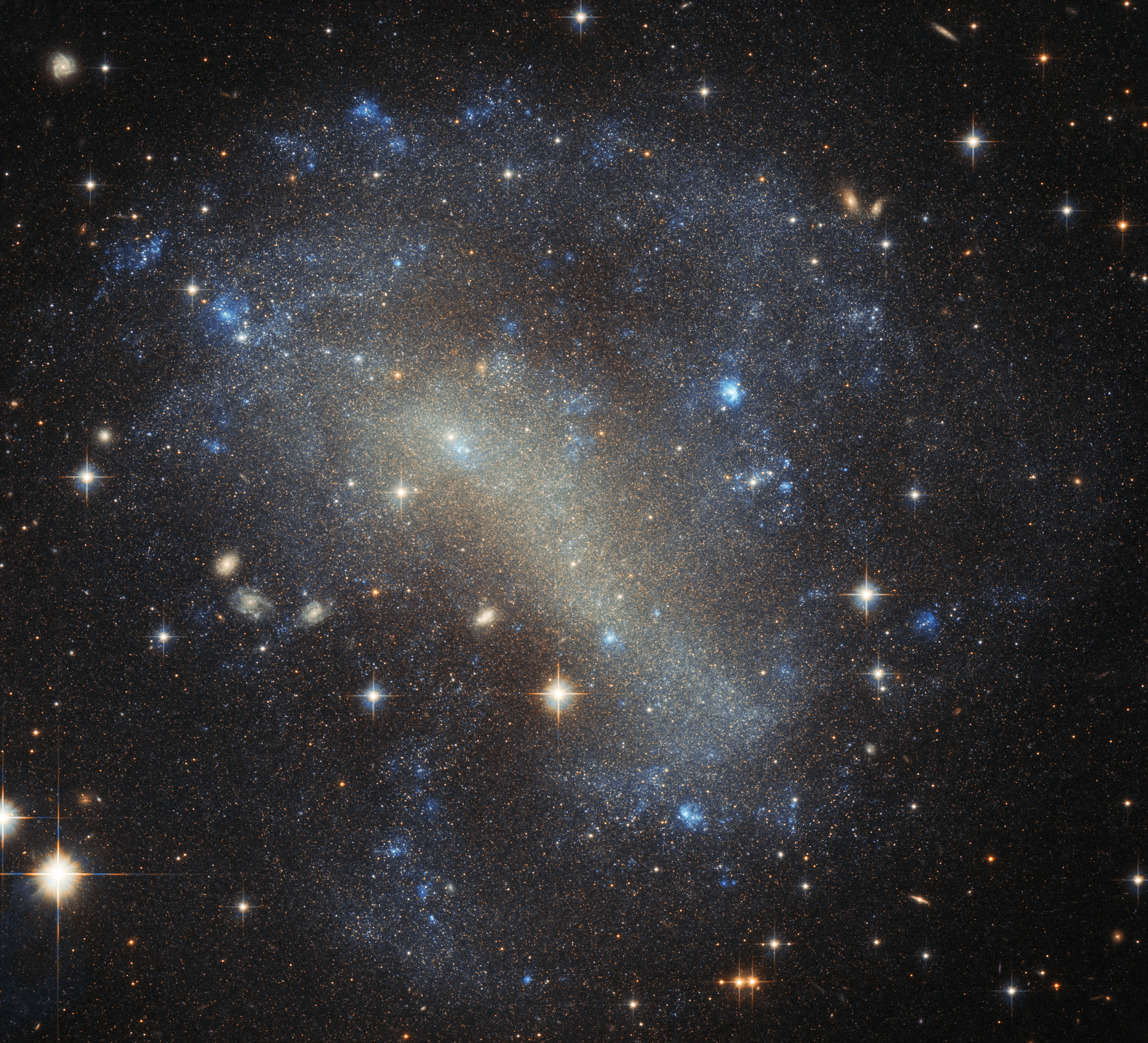
IC 4710 lies roughly 25 million light-years away in the southern constellation of Pavo.

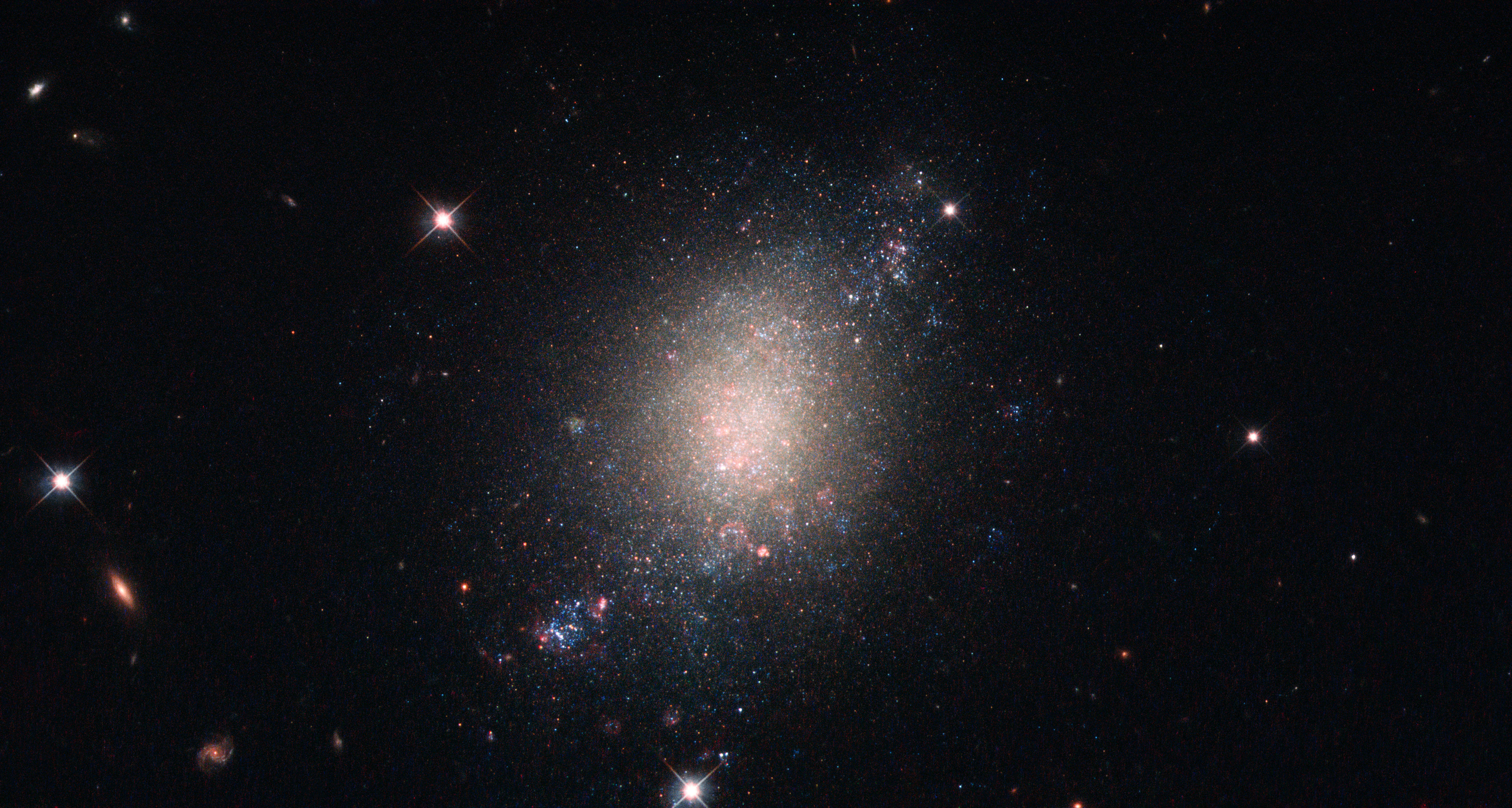
ESO 486-21 is a spiral galaxy with a somewhat irregular and ill-defined structure.

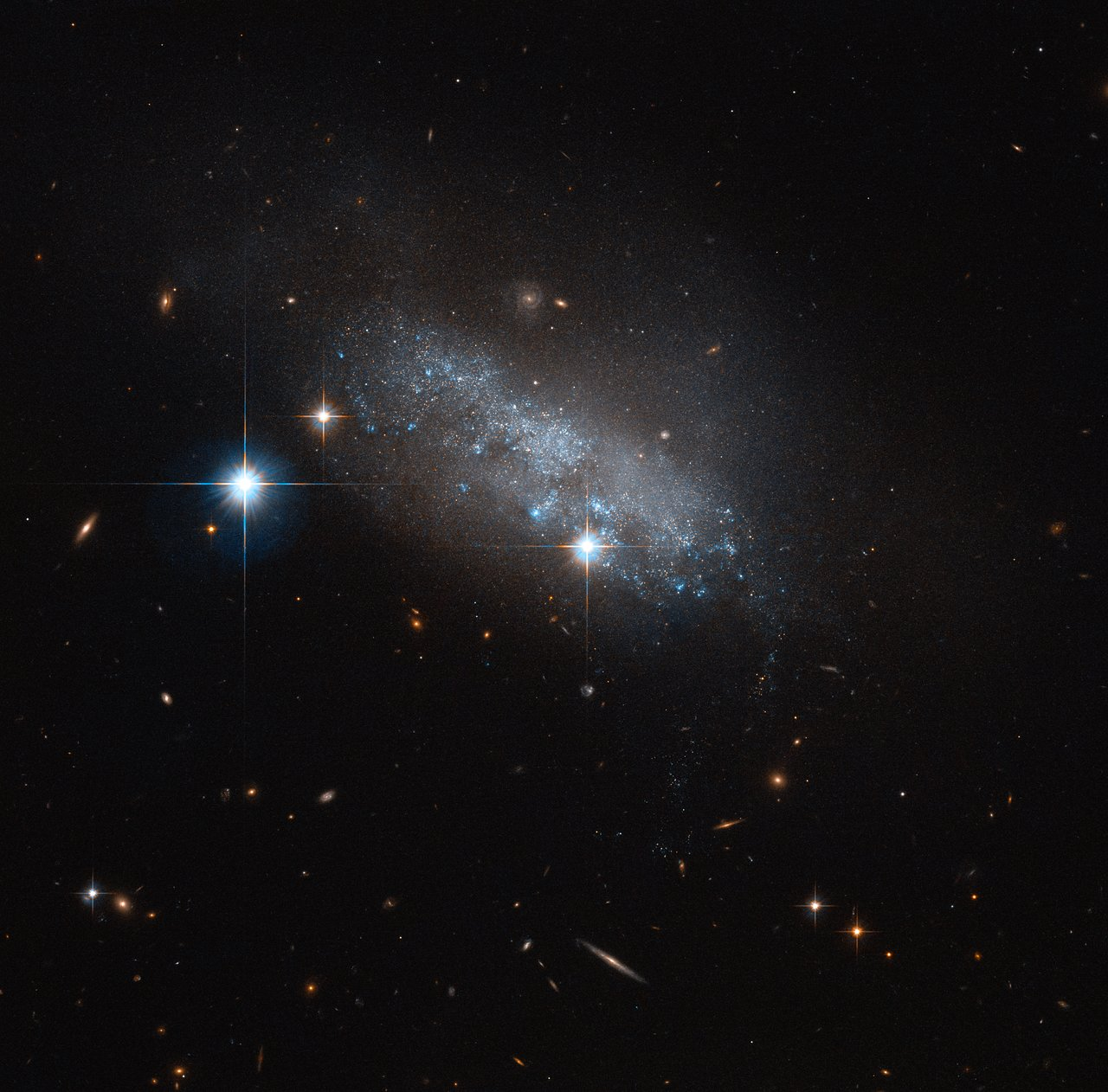
Irregular galaxy IC 3583 has been found to have a bar of stars running through its center.

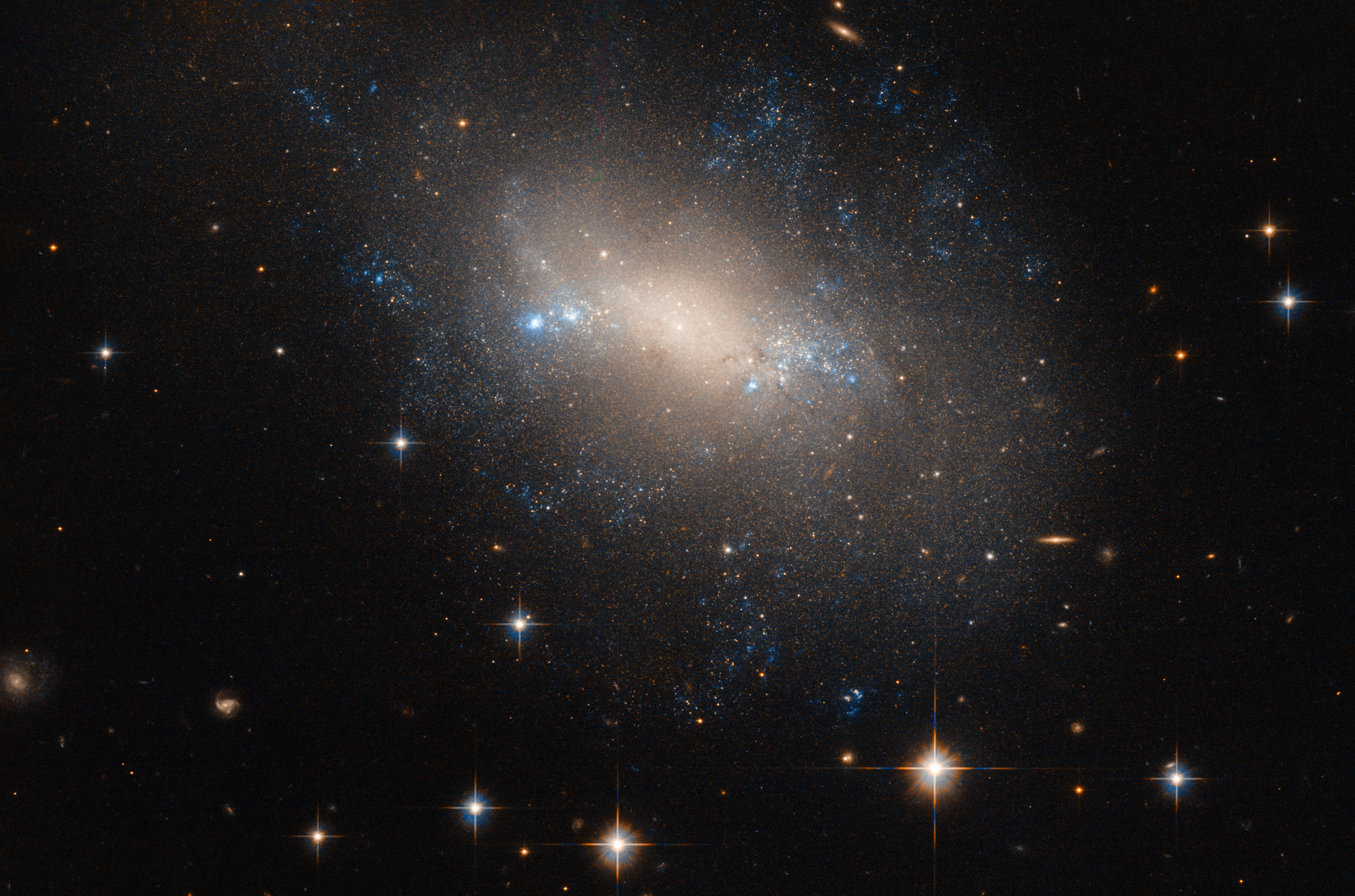
NGC 2337 is an irregular galaxy that resides 25 million light-years away in the constellation Lynx.

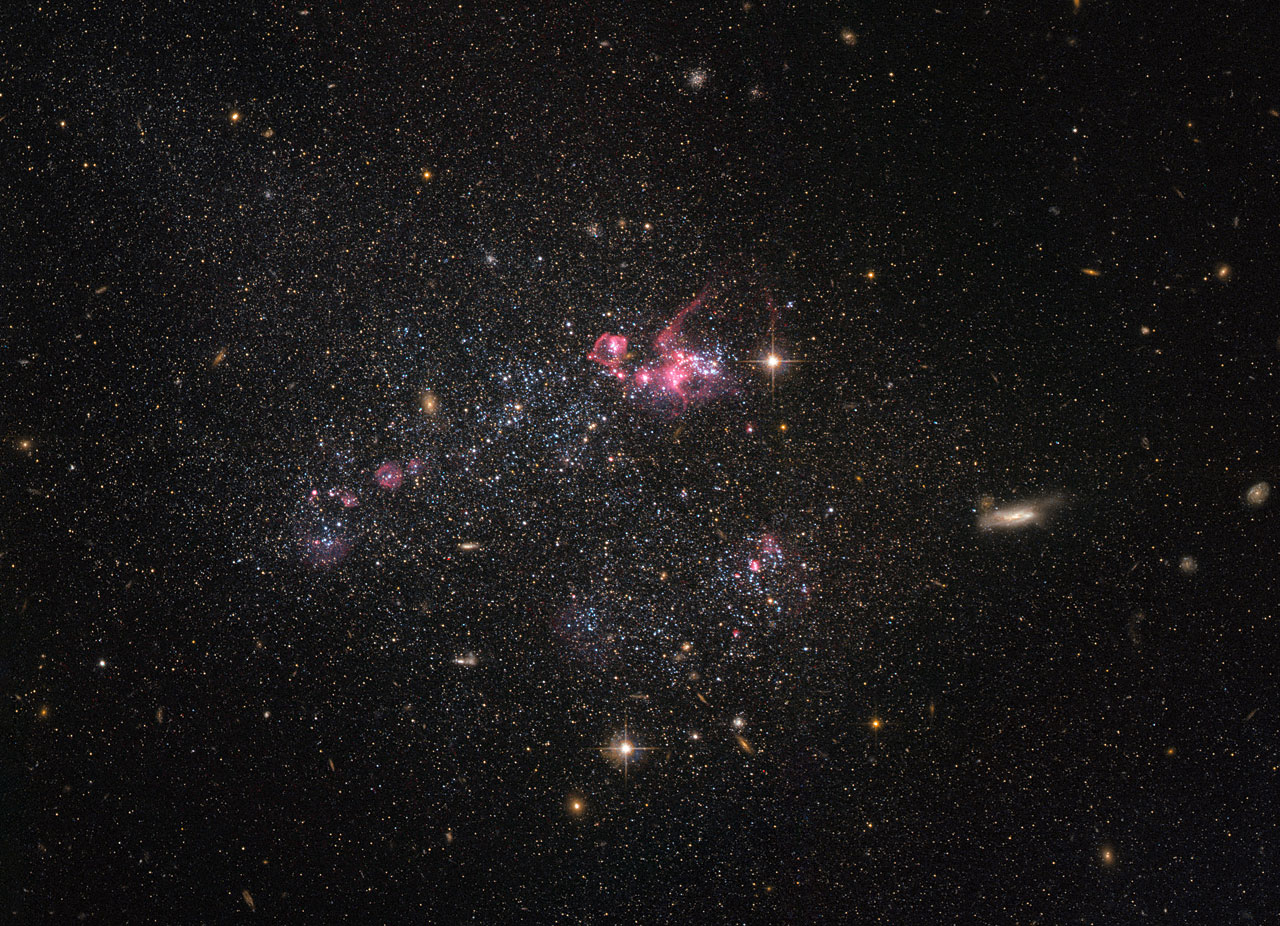
UGC 4459 is an irregular dwarf galaxy located approximately 11 million light-years away in the constellation of Ursa Major.

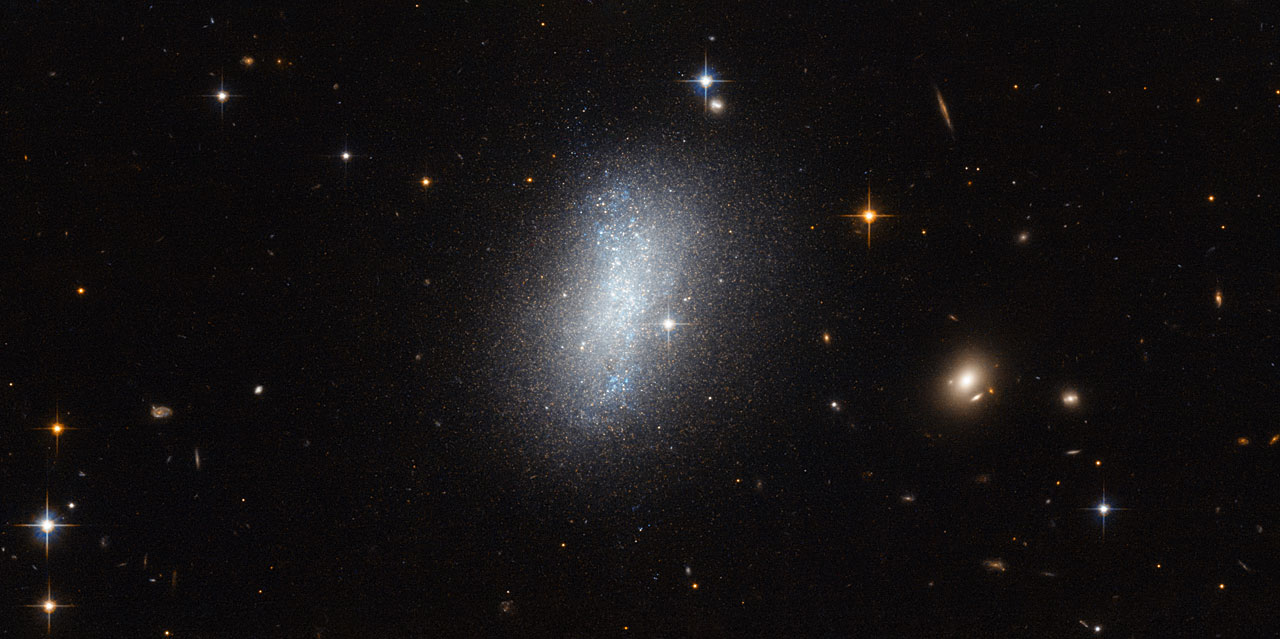
Dwarf irregular galaxy known as PGC 18431

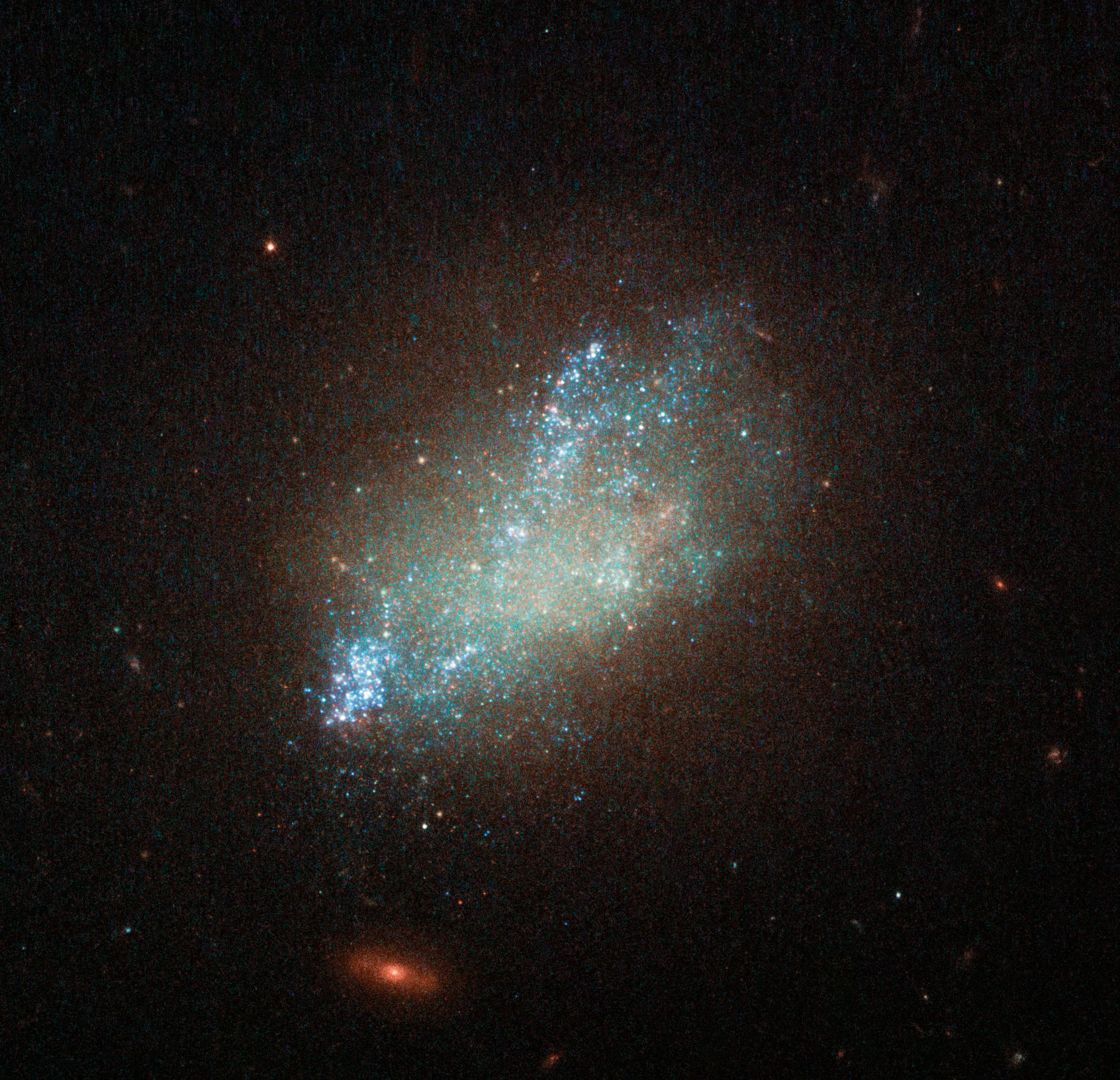
IC 559 is classified as a type Sm galaxy.

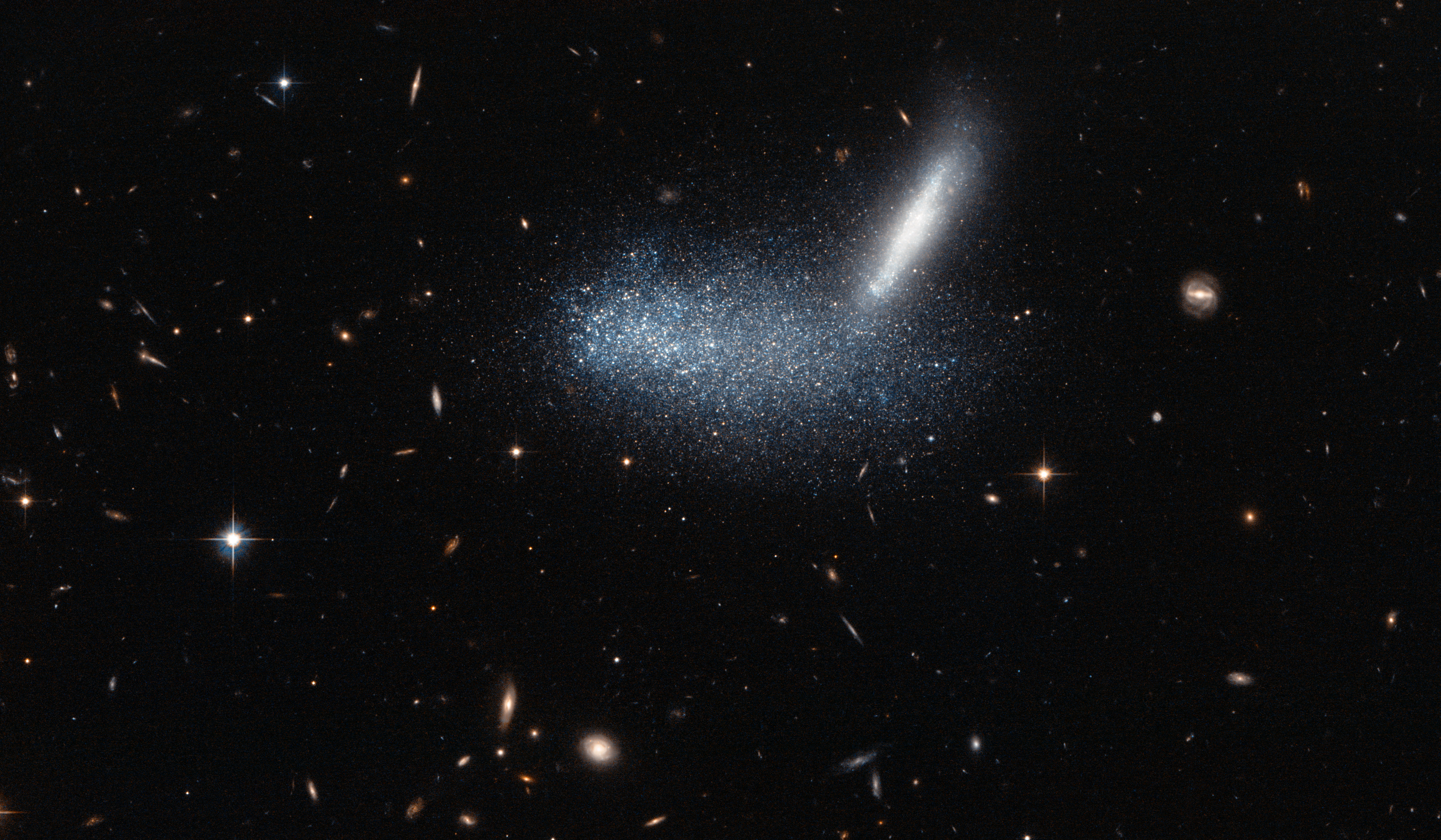
Irregular dwarf galaxy PGC 16389 covers its neighboring galaxy APMBGC 252+125-117.

== See also ==
- Blueberry galaxy – Small and very active galaxies.
- Dwarf galaxy
- Dwarf elliptical galaxy
- Peculiar galaxy
- Galaxy morphological classification
