= NGC 2014 =

Red emission nebula in the constellation Dorado

Nebula
- Left (blue) NGC 2020 and right (red) NGC 2014, photo by Hubble Space Telescope

Observation data: J2000 epoch
- Right ascension: 05^{h} 44^{m} 12.7^{s}
- Declination: −67° 42′ 57″
- Constellation: Dorado
- Designations: NGC 2014, ESO 56-SC146, GC 1217, h 2900

NGC 2014 is a red emission nebula surrounding an open cluster of stars in the Large Magellanic Cloud, at a distance of about 163,000 light-years.

The nebula was discovered on 3 August 1826 by Scottish astronomer James Dunlop. Together with NGC 2020 it makes up what is called the Cosmic Reef.
