= NGC 1850 BH1 =

Binary star system

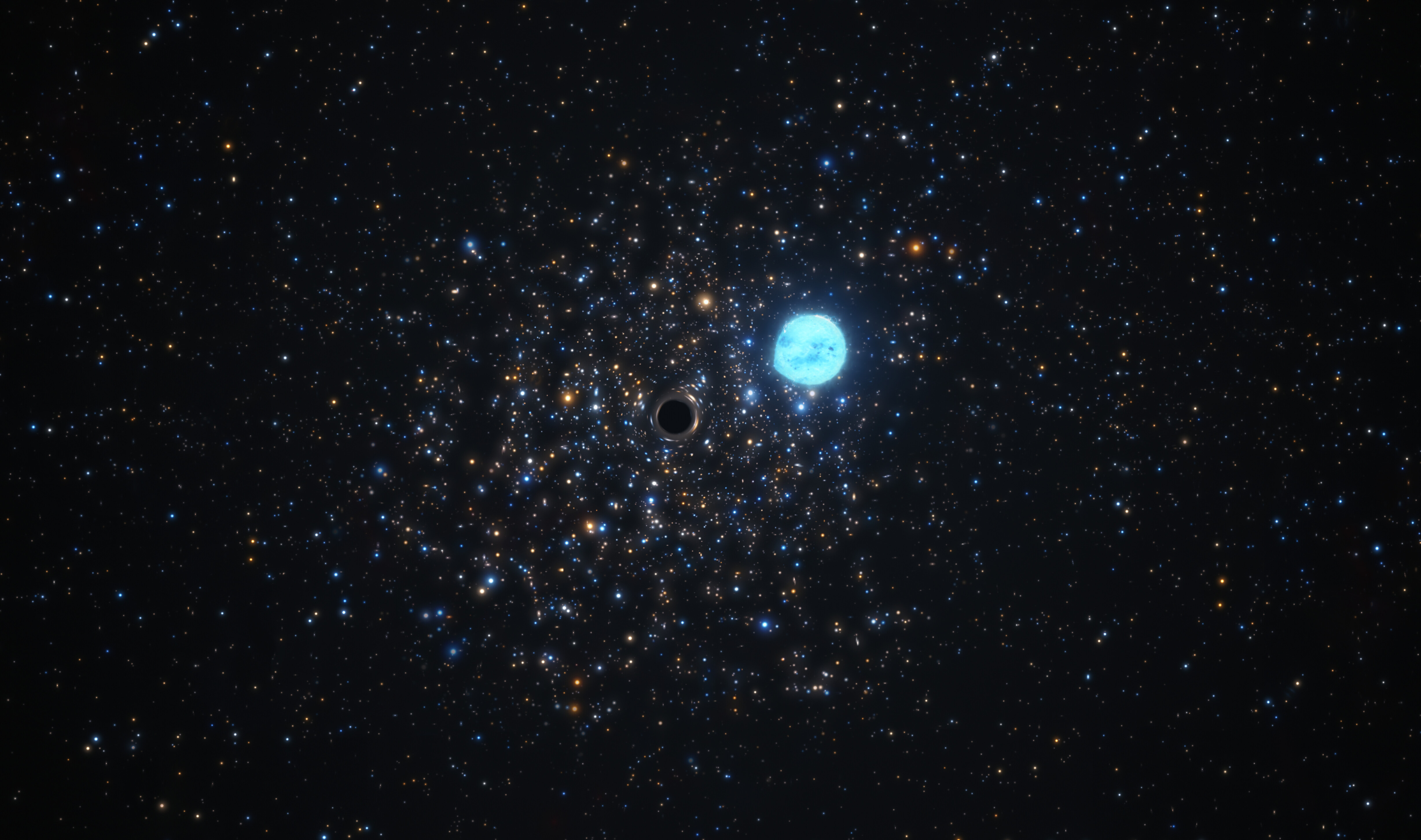
- Artist's impression of NGC 1850 BH1, if it does indeed contain a black hole.

Observation data Epoch J2000.0 Equinox ICRS
- Constellation: Dorado
- Right ascension: 05^{h} 08^{m} 46.70^{s}
- Declination: −68° 45′ 55.6″

Astrometry

Visible star
Radial velocity (R_{v})	176±3 km/s

Details

Visible star
Radius	4.9–6.5 R_{☉}

NGC 1850 BH1 is a binary star system located in the cluster NGC 1850 in the Large Magellanic Cloud.

NGC 1850 BH1 (Black Hole 1) was discovered by a team led by Sara Saracino in 2022; the team was systematically searching for black holes in the Large Magellanic Cloud. They discovered a binary system containing an approximately 5-solar-mass main-sequence turnoff star which was beginning to fill its Roche lobe and an unseen binary companion. Using radial velocity and light curve modeling, the team found the mass of the unseen companion to be 11.1 solar masses. This would firmly classify it as a black hole.

Doubt has been cast on the black hole nature of this object, however. A black hole in such a binary system would likely emit X-rays, yet when analyzed by Chandra, no X-ray emission from the source was found. A 2022 study by Kareem El-Badry and Kevin B. Burdge found that the mass of the visible object was likely overestimated, which would also cause the mass of the unseen companion to be overestimated. They found that the visible star’s observed density is too low to exceed about 1.5 solar masses, and it is most likely a ~1.1 solar mass stripped star with a large radius of 5.7 solar radii. This lower mass of the visible star would be consistent with a ~3.5 solar mass main-sequence companion rather than a black hole. A study by Heloise Stevance, Steven Parsons, and Jan J. Eldridge got a similar result. Using a model of stellar evolution, they found that a black-hole binary system with the observed mass parameters is extremely unlikely, and that a stripped star system is a better explanation.

A follow-up study by Sara Saracino's team in 2023 refuted the studies by El-Badry and Burdge and Stevance, Parsons, and Eldridge, stating that the possibility of a black hole in NGC 1850 BH1 should not be ruled out. They found that, even in the stripped-star scenario, the unseen object, if a star, should have still been bright enough to be detectable in the binary's spectrum. They determined that if it were a star, it would have to be obscured by an optically thick accretion disk. They also stated that, even if the mass of the unseen star was lower than originally calculated, it would still not rule out a black hole, since the object would still be more massive than the TOV limit.
