= SHOC 579 =

One of the most massive and metal-rich blueberry galaxies

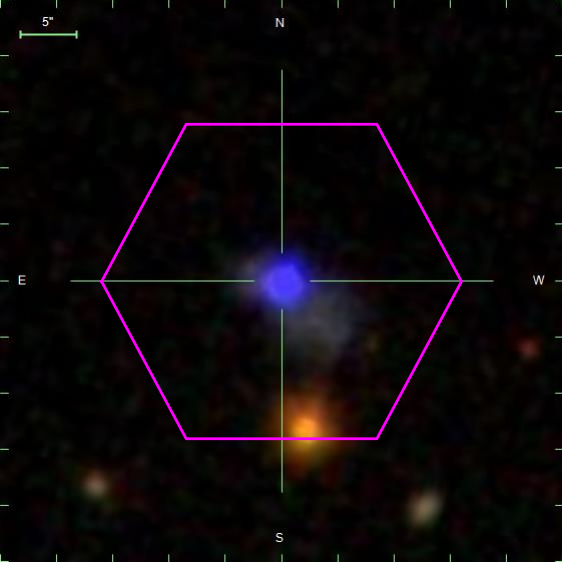
- Image of SHOC 579

Observation data
- Right ascension: 17h 35m 01.25s
- Declination: +57d 03m 09s
- Distance: 650 mly

Characteristics
- Type: Blueberry galaxy
- Mass: 4.75x10^9 solar mass M_{☉}
- Notable features: One of the most massive blueberry galaxies discovered

SHOC 579 is a compact Lyman-alpha emitting blueberry galaxy located at a redshift distance of z=0.0472 (around 650 million light-years). SHOC 579 is currently one of the most massive and metal-rich blueberry galaxies discovered. SHOC 579 is also the first blueberry galaxy to have the kinematics of the stars and gas studied. It has been confirmed that SHOC 579 does not have an active galactic nucleus (AGN).

== Stellar population ==
The galaxy has a stellar mass of 4.75x10^9 solar masses. SHOC 579 has properties of a strong starburst galaxy. Strong burst regions in the SHOC 579 galaxy are often associated with dust with a range from dense to porous. Its stellar population is a mix of old, intermediate and massive young stars such as massive Wolf-Rayet stars. But most stars fall within the age of 5-7 billion years old.

== See also ==
- List of astronomical catalogues - SDSS SHOC catalogue.
