= Large Magellanic Cloud =

Satellite galaxy of the Milky Way

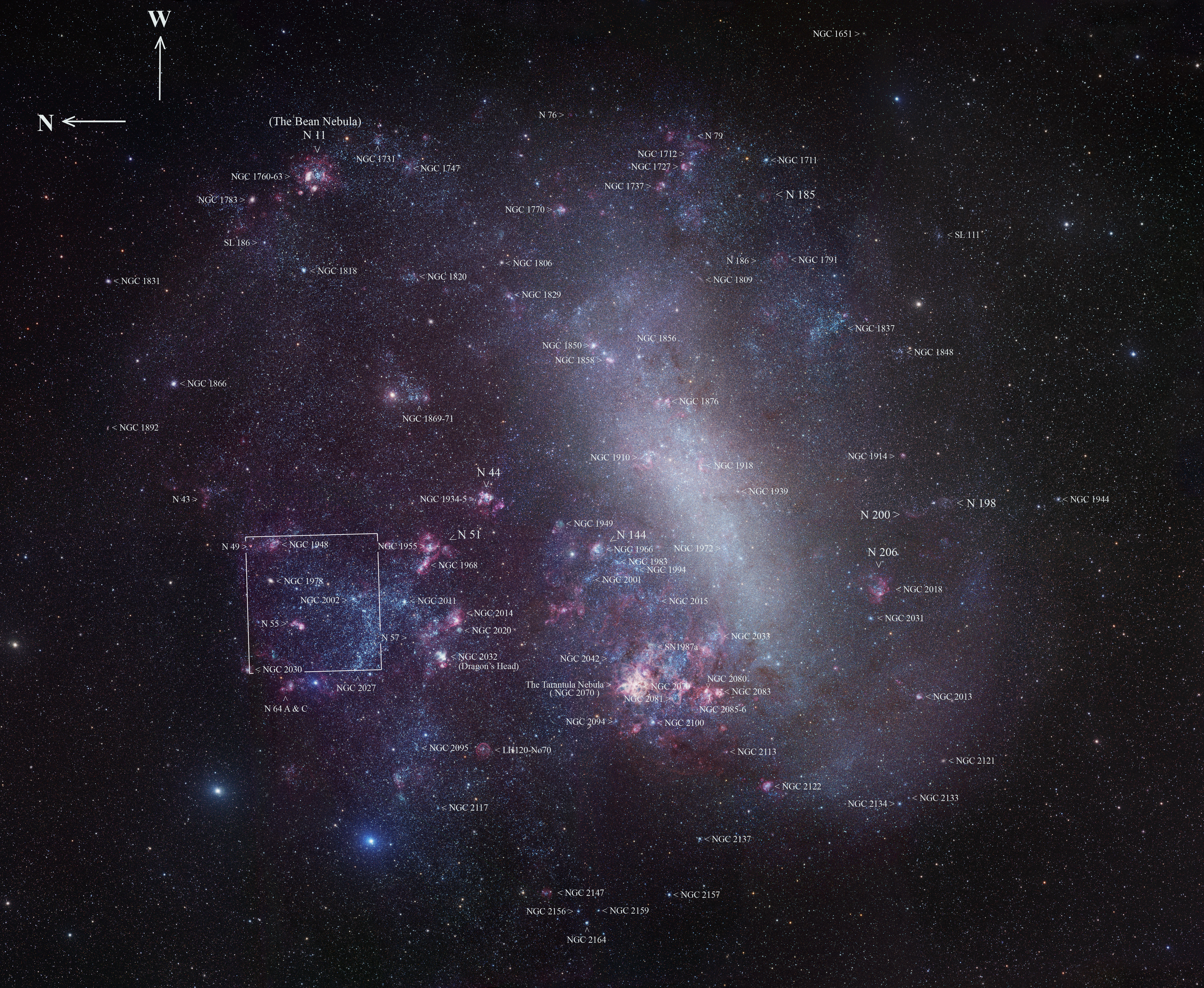
- A map of the Large Magellanic Cloud with the brightest features annotated

Observation data (J2000 epoch)
- Constellation: Dorado/Mensa
- Right ascension: 05^{h} 23^{m} 34^{s}
- Declination: −69° 45.4′
- Distance: 163,000 light-years (49.97 kpc)
- Apparent magnitude (V): 0.13

Characteristics
- Type: SB(s)m
- Mass: 1×10^{10} (excluding dark matter), 1.38×10^{11} (including dark matter). M_{☉}
- Number of stars: 20 billion
- Size: 9.86 kpc (32,200 ly) (diameter; 25.0 mag/arcsec^{2} B-band isophote)
- Apparent size (V): 10.75° × 9.17°

Other designations
- LMC, ESO 56- G 115, PGC 17223, Nubecula Major

The Large Magellanic Cloud (LMC) is a dwarf galaxy and satellite galaxy of the Milky Way. At a distance of around 50 kiloparsecs (163,000 light-years), the LMC is the second- or third-closest galaxy to the Milky Way, after the Sagittarius Dwarf Spheroidal (c. 16 kiloparsecs or 52,000 light-years away) and the possible dwarf irregular galaxy called the Canis Major Overdensity. It is about 9.86 kiloparsecs (32,200 light-years) across and has roughly one-hundredth the mass of the Milky Way, making it the fourth-largest galaxy in the Local Group after the Andromeda Galaxy (M31), the Milky Way, and the Triangulum Galaxy (M33).

The LMC is classified as a Magellanic spiral. It contains a stellar bar that is geometrically off-center, suggesting that it was once a barred dwarf spiral galaxy before its spiral arms were disrupted, likely by tidal interactions from the nearby Small Magellanic Cloud (SMC) and the Milky Way's gravity. The LMC is predicted to merge with the Milky Way in approximately 2.4 billion years.

With a declination of about −70°, the LMC is visible as a faint "cloud" from the Southern Hemisphere of the Earth and from as far north as 20° N. It straddles the constellations Dorado and Mensa and has an apparent length of about 10° to the naked eye, 20 times the Moon's diameter, from dark sites away from light pollution.

== History of observation ==
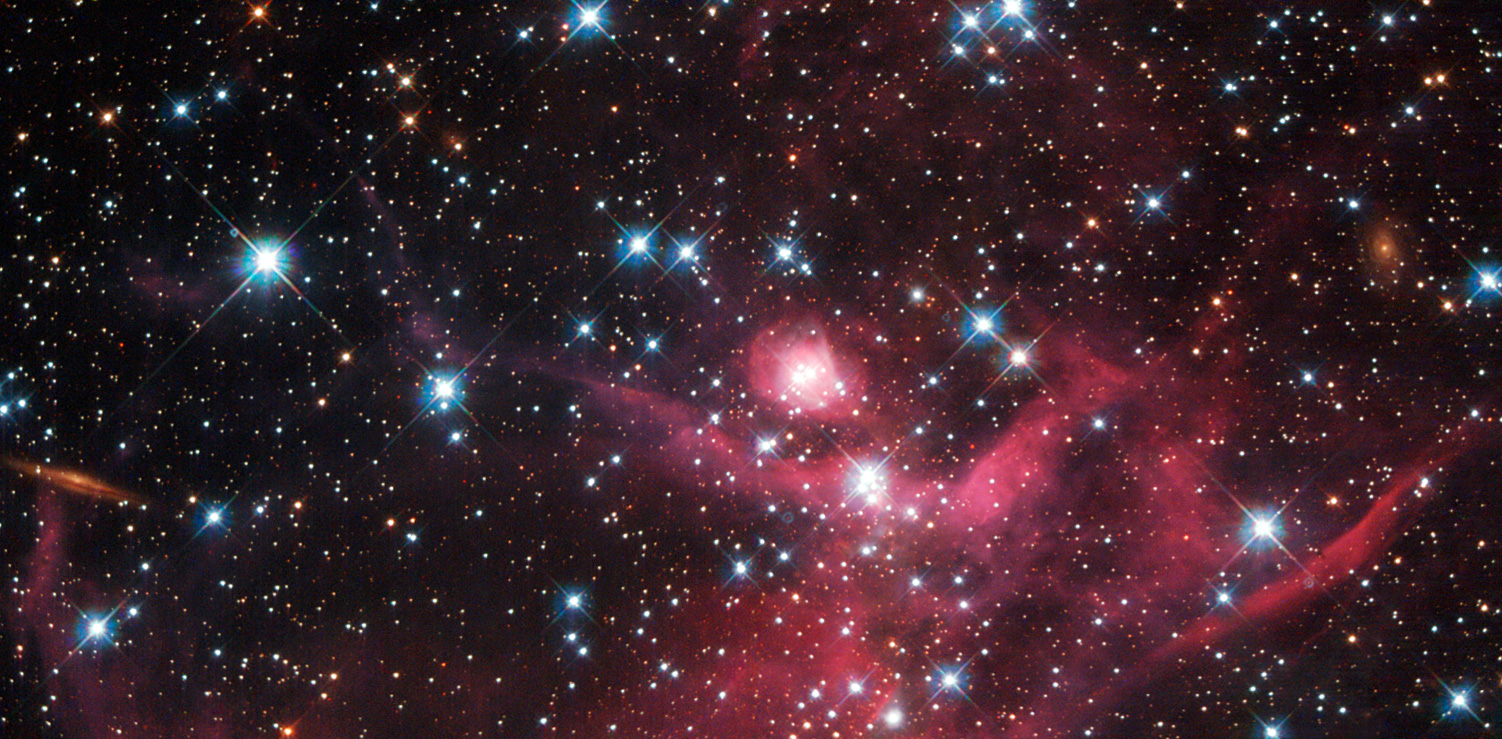
Small part of the Large Magellanic Cloud

Both the Large and Small Magellanic Clouds have been easily visible for southern nighttime observers well back into prehistory. It has been claimed that the first known written mention of the Large Magellanic Cloud was by the Persian astronomer 'Abd al-Rahman al-Sufi Shirazi (later known in Europe as "Azophi"), which he referred to as Al Bakr, the White Ox, in his Book of Fixed Stars around 964 AD. However, this seems to be a misunderstanding of a reference to some stars south of Canopus which he admits he had not seen.

The first confirmed recorded observation was in a letter written in 1502 by Amerigo Vespucci after his second voyage. He mentioned "three Canopi [sic], two bright and one obscure"; "bright" refers to the two Magellanic Clouds, and "obscure" refers to the Coalsack.

Constellation of Dorado: the LMC is the green circle at the south (bottom) of picture.

Ferdinand Magellan sighted the LMC on his voyage in 1519 and his writings brought it into common Western knowledge. The galaxy now bears his name. The galaxy and southern end of Dorado are in the current epoch at opposition on about 5 December when thus visible from sunset to sunrise from equatorial points such as Ecuador, the Congos, Uganda, Kenya and Indonesia and for part of the night in nearby months. Above about 28° south, such as most of Australia and South Africa, the galaxy is always sufficiently above the horizon to be considered properly circumpolar, thus during spring and autumn the cloud is also visible much of the night, and the height of winter in June nearly coincides with closest proximity to the Sun's apparent position.

Measurements with the Hubble Space Telescope, announced in 2006, suggest the Large and Small Magellanic Clouds may be moving too quickly to be orbiting the Milky Way.

Astronomers discovered a new black hole inside the Large Magellanic Cloud, NGC 1850 BH1, in November 2021 using the European Southern Observatory's Very Large Telescope in Chile. Astronomers claim its gravity is influenced by a nearby star, which is about five times the mass of the Sun.

In March 2025, the Center for Astrophysics announced strong evidence for a supermassive black hole in the Large Magellanic Cloud, the second-closest besides Sagittarius A*, with an estimated mass 600,000 times that of the Sun.

== Geometry ==
ESO's VISTA image of the LMC

The Large Magellanic Cloud has a prominent central bar and spiral arm. The central bar, with a radius of 6,900 light-years (2.13 kpc) and a position angle of about 121°, seems to be warped so that the east and west ends are nearer the Milky Way than the middle. In 2014, measurements from the Hubble Space Telescope made it possible to determine a rotation period of 250 million years.

The LMC was long considered to be a planar galaxy that could be assumed to lie at a single distance from the Solar System. However, in 1986, Caldwell and Coulson found that field Cepheid variables in the northeast lie closer to the Milky Way than those in the southwest. From 2001 to 2002 this inclined geometry was confirmed by the same means, by core helium-burning red clump stars, and by the tip of the red giant branch. All three papers find an inclination of ~35°, where a face-on galaxy has an inclination of 0°. Further work on the structure of the LMC using the kinematics of carbon stars showed that the LMC's disk is both thick and flared, likely due to interactions with the SMC. Regarding the distribution of star clusters in the LMC, Schommer et al. measured velocities for ~80 clusters and found that the LMC's cluster system has kinematics consistent with the clusters moving in a disk-like distribution. These results were confirmed by Grocholski et al., who calculated distances to a sample of clusters and showed that the cluster system is distributed in the same plane as the field stars.

== Distance ==
Location of the Large Magellanic Cloud with respect to the Milky Way and other satellite galaxies

The distance to the LMC has been calculated using standard candles; Cepheid variables are one of the most popular. These have been shown to have a relationship between their absolute luminosity and the period over which their brightness varies. However the variable of metallicity may also need to be taken as a component of this as consensus is this likely affects their period–luminosity relations. Cepheid variables in the Milky Way typically used to calibrate the relation are more metal-rich than those found in the LMC.

Modern 8-meter-class optical telescopes have discovered eclipsing binaries throughout the Local Group. Parameters of these systems can be measured without mass or compositional assumptions. The light echoes of supernova 1987A are also geometric measurements, without any stellar models or assumptions.

In 2006, the Cepheid absolute luminosity was re-calibrated using Cepheid variables in the galaxy Messier 106 that cover a range of metallicities. Using this improved calibration, they find an absolute distance modulus of $(m - M)_0 = 18.41$, or 48 kpc (160,000 light-years). This distance has been confirmed by other authors.

By cross-correlating different measurement methods, one can bound the distance; the residual errors are now less than the estimated size parameters of the LMC.

The results of a study using late-type eclipsing binaries to determine the distance more accurately was published in the scientific journal Nature in March 2013. A distance of 49.97 kpc (163,000 light-years) with an accuracy of 2.2% was obtained.

== Features ==
Two very different glowing gas clouds in the Large Magellanic Cloud, NGC 2014 (orange) and NGC 2020 (blue)

Like many irregular galaxies, the LMC is rich in gas and dust, and is currently undergoing vigorous star formation activity. It holds the Tarantula Nebula, the most active star-forming region in the Local Group.

The LMC has a wide range of galactic objects and phenomena that make it known as an "astronomical treasure-house, a great celestial laboratory for the study of the growth and evolution of the stars", per Robert Burnham Jr. Surveys of the galaxy have found roughly 60 globular clusters, 400 planetary nebulae and 700 open clusters, along with hundreds of thousands of giant and supergiant stars. Supernova 1987A—the nearest supernova in recent years—was in the Large Magellanic Cloud. The Lionel-Murphy SNR (N86) nitrogen-abundant supernova remnant was named by astronomers at the Australian National University's Mount Stromlo Observatory, acknowledging Australian High Court Justice Lionel Murphy's interest in science and its perceived resemblance to his large nose.

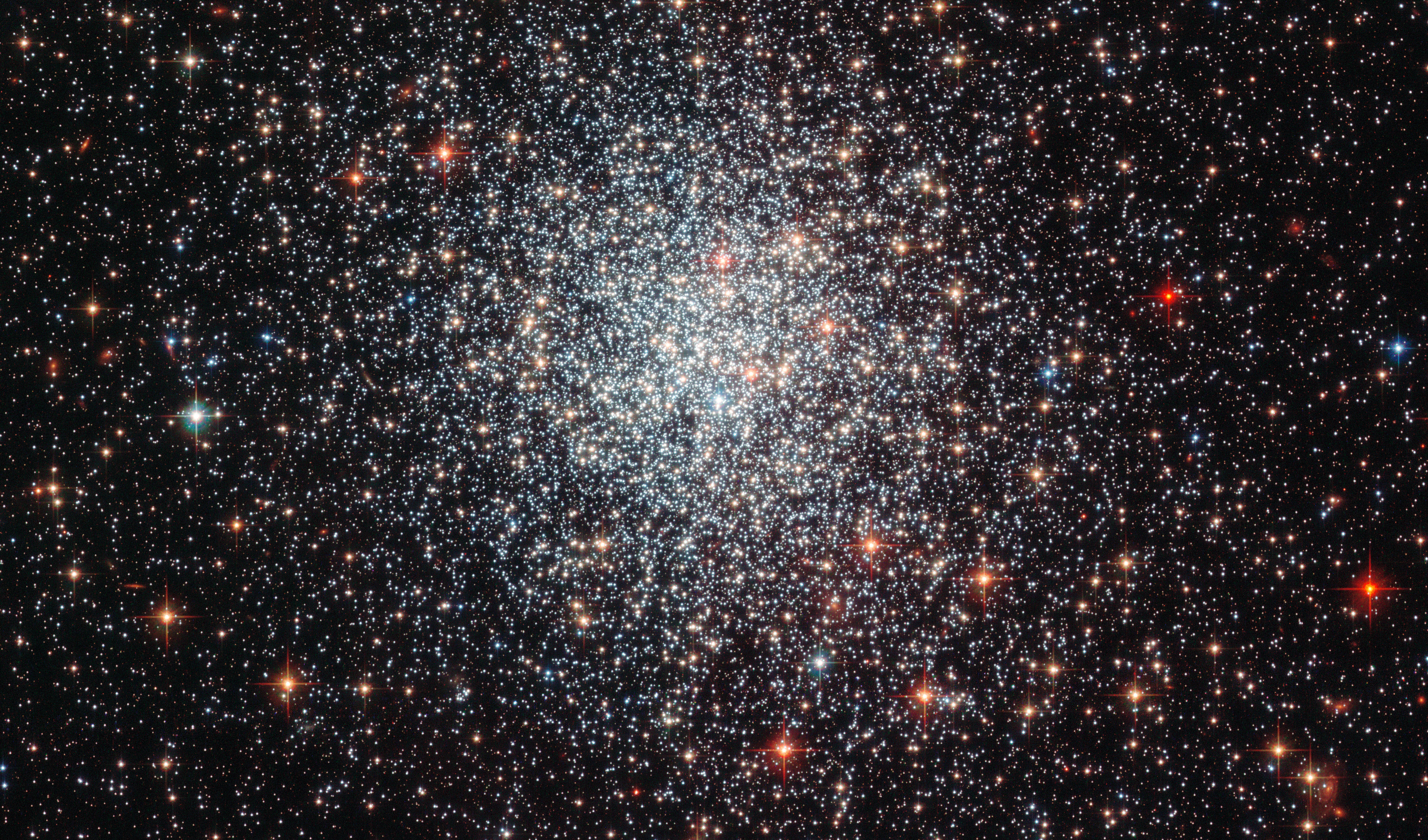
NGC 1783 is one of the biggest globular clusters in the Large Magellanic Cloud.

A bridge of gas connects the Small Magellanic Cloud (SMC) with the LMC, which evinces tidal interaction between the galaxies. The Magellanic Clouds have a common envelope of neutral hydrogen, indicating that they have been gravitationally bound for a long time. This bridge of gas is a star-forming site.

The Large Magellanic Cloud likely has a supermassive black hole at its center, estimated to have 630,000+370,000
−380,000 times the mass of the Sun. 21 hypervelocity stars have been discovered within the Milky Way's halo, which are thought to have been ejected from the Large Magellanic Cloud after gravitational interaction with this black hole via the Hills mechanism.

== X-ray sources ==
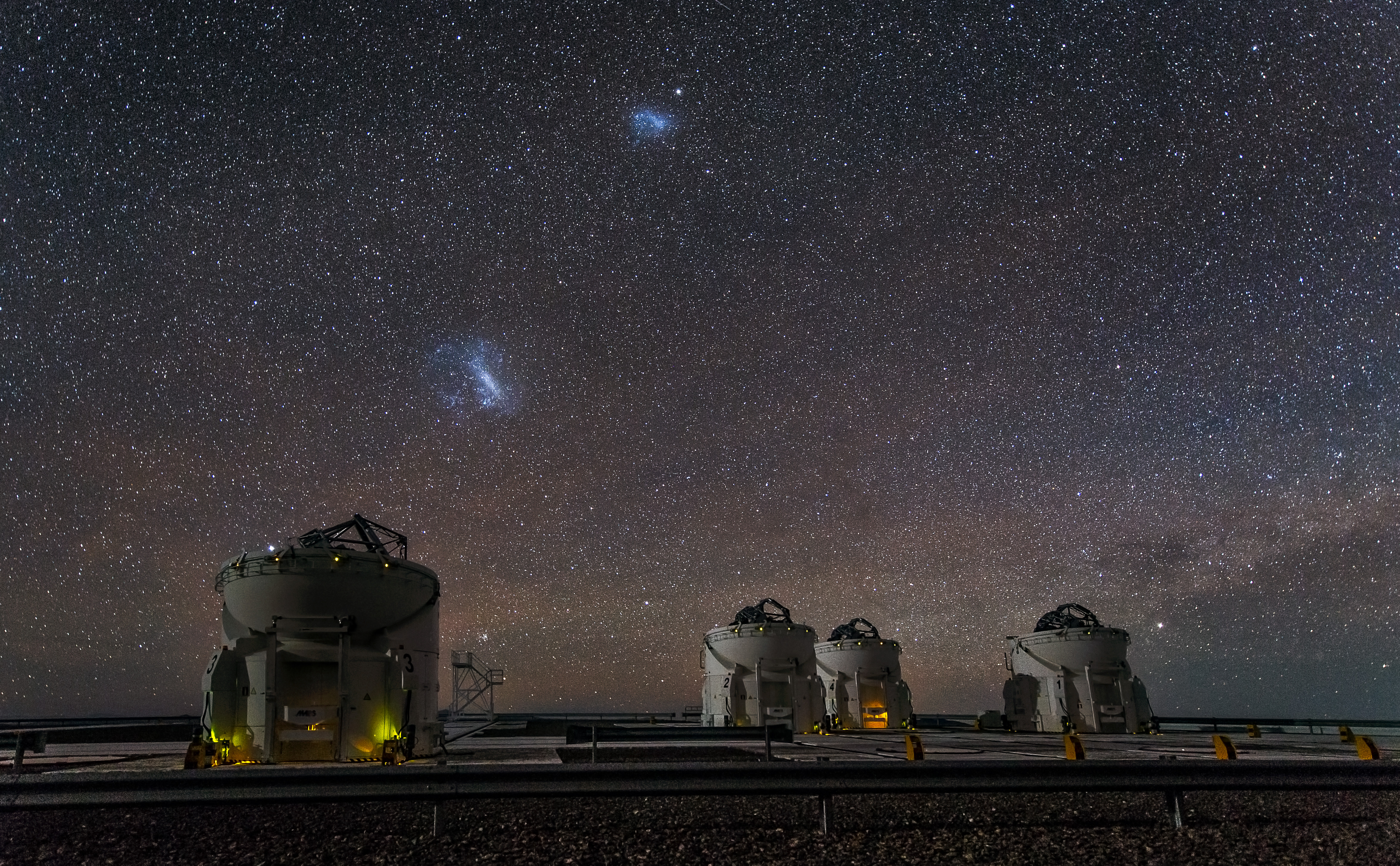
Small and Large Magellanic Clouds over Paranal Observatory

No X-rays above background were detected from either cloud during the September 20, 1966, Nike-Tomahawk rocket flight nor that of two days later. The second took off from Johnston Atoll at 17:13 UTC and reached an apogee of 160 km (99 mi), with spin-stabilization at 5.6 rps. The LMC was not detected in the X-ray range 8–80 keV.

Another was launched from same atoll at 11:32 UTC on October 29, 1968, to scan the LMC for X-rays. The first discrete X-ray source in Dorado was at RA 05^{h} 20^{m} Dec −69°, and it was the Large Magellanic Cloud. This X-ray source extended over about 12° and is consistent with the Cloud. Its emission rate between 1.5–10.5 keV for a distance of 50 kpc is 4×10^{38} ergs/s. An X-ray astronomy instrument was carried aboard a Thor missile launched from the same atoll on September 24, 1970, at 12:54 UTC and altitudes above 300 km (190 mi), to search for the Small Magellanic Cloud and to extend observation of the LMC. The source in the LMC appeared extended and contained star ε Dor. The X-ray luminosity (L_{x}) over the range 1.5–12 keV was 6×10^{31} W (6×10^{38} erg/s).

The Large Magellanic Cloud (LMC) appears in the constellations Mensa and Dorado. LMC X-1 (the first X-ray source in the LMC) is at RA 05^{h} 40^{m} 05^{s} Dec −69° 45′ 51″, and is a high-mass X-ray binary (star system) source (HMXB). Of the first five luminous LMC X-ray binaries: LMC X-1, X-2, X-3, X-4 and A 0538–66 (detected by Ariel 5 at A 0538–66), LMC X-2 is the one that is a bright low-mass X-ray binary system (LMXB) in the LMC.

DEM L316 in the Cloud consists of two supernova remnants. Chandra X-ray spectra show that the hot gas shell on the upper left has an abundance of iron. This implies that the upper-left SNR is the product of a Type Ia supernova; much lower such abundance in the lower remnant belies a Type II supernova.

A 16 ms X-ray pulsar is associated with SNR 0538-69.1. SNR 0540-697 was resolved using ROSAT.

== Gallery ==
Large Magellanic Cloud imaged by Petr Horálek

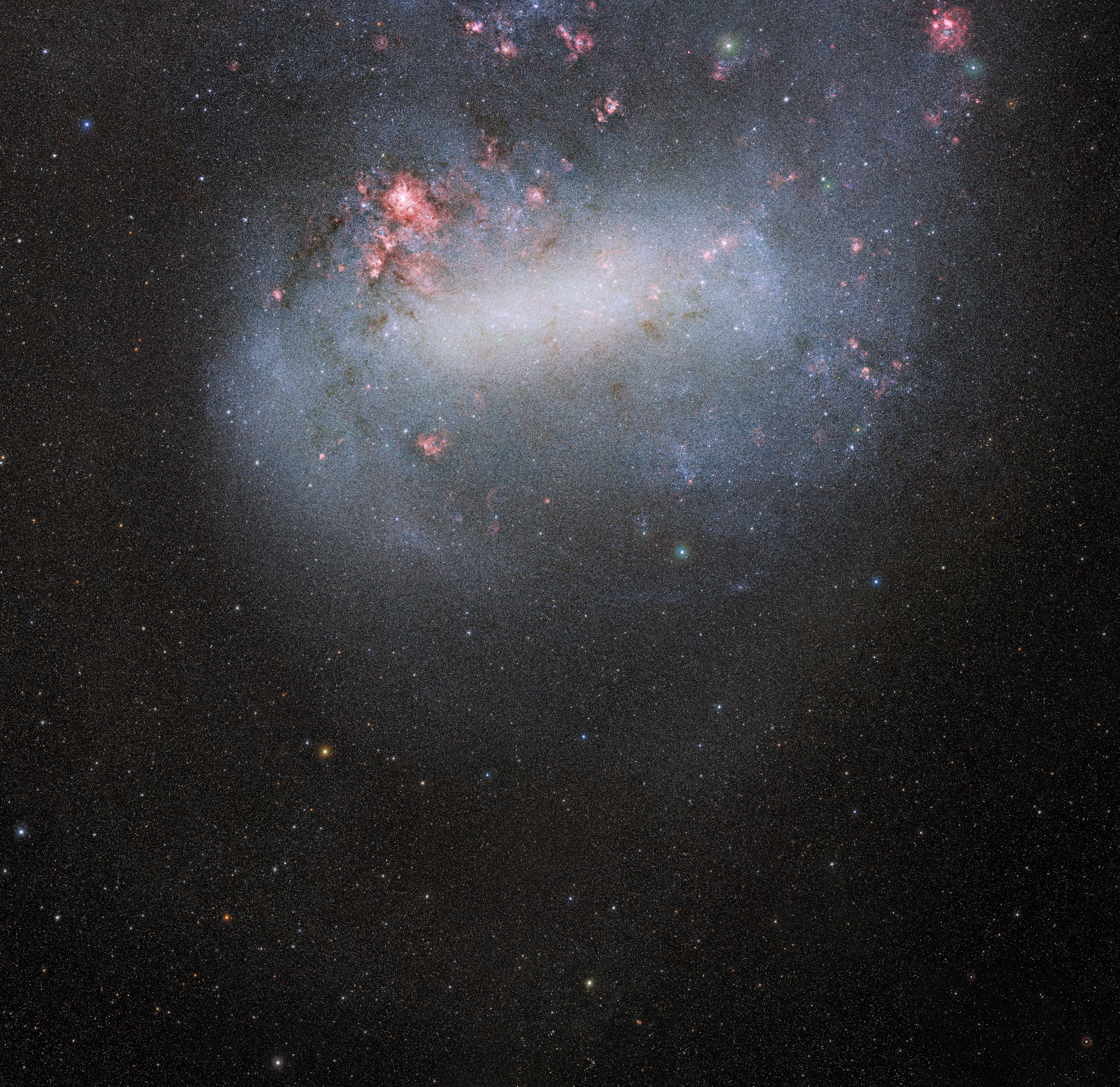
Part of the SMASH dataset showing a wide-angle view of the Large Magellanic Cloud

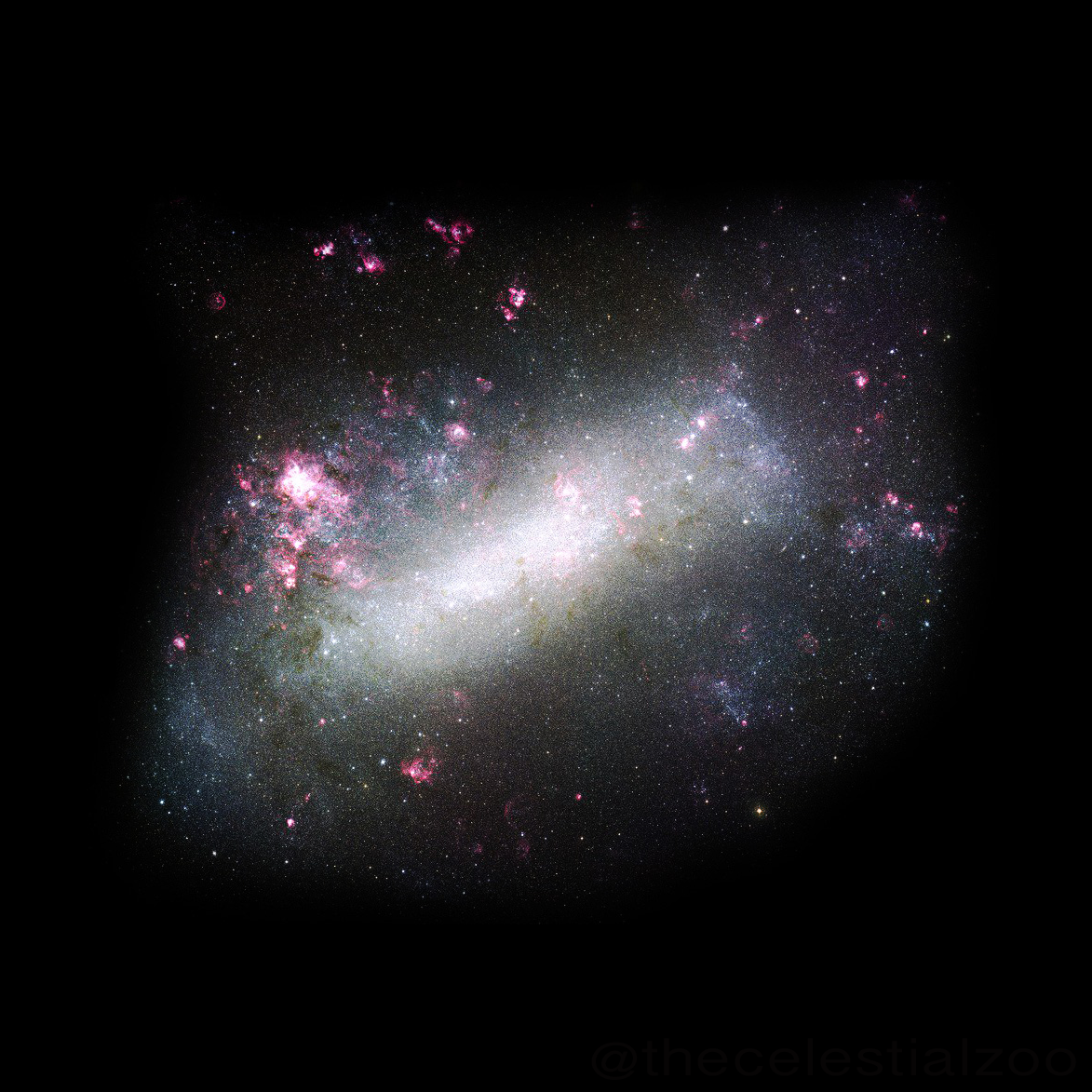
Large Magellanic Cloud as photographed by an amateur astronomer. Unrelated stars have been edited out.

Large Magellanic Cloud rendered from Gaia EDR3

Large Magellanic Cloud rendered from Gaia EDR3 without foreground stars

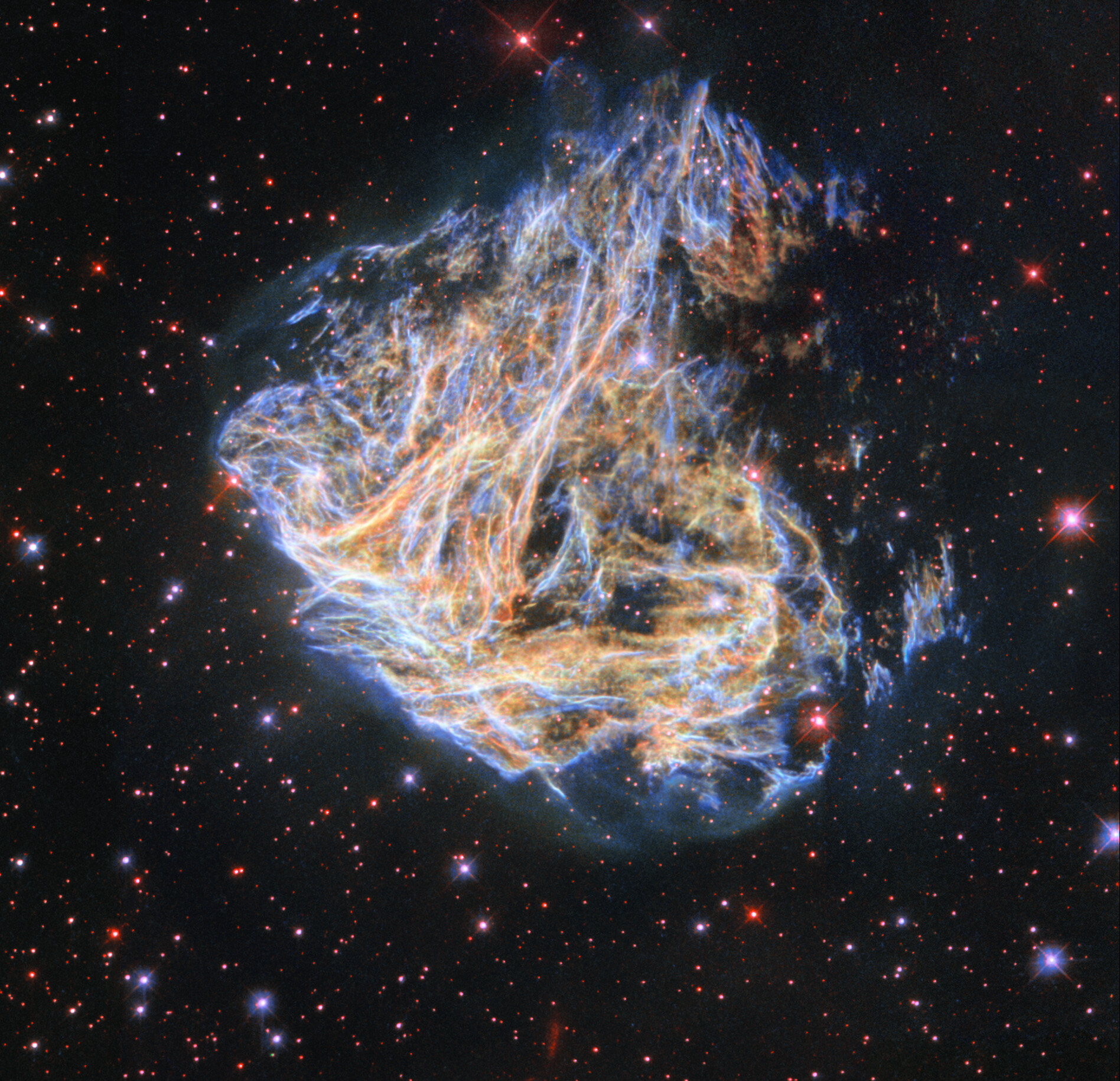
Revisiting a Celestial Fireworks Display Shreds, from the Wide Field Planetary Camera 2. The delicate sheets and intricate filaments are debris from the cataclysmic death of a massive star that once lived in the LMC.

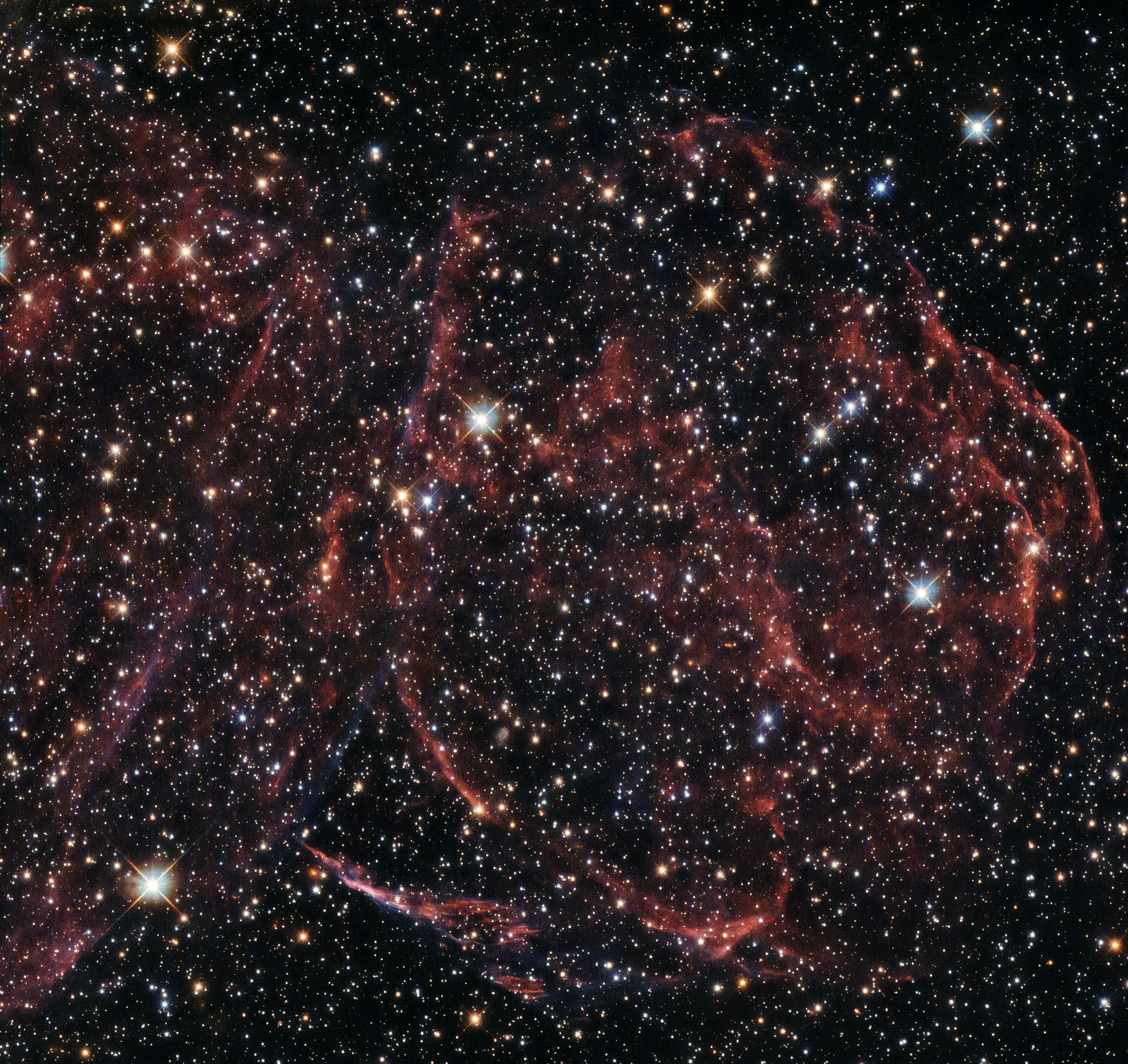
DEM L316A is located some 160,000 light-years away in the Large Magellanic Cloud.

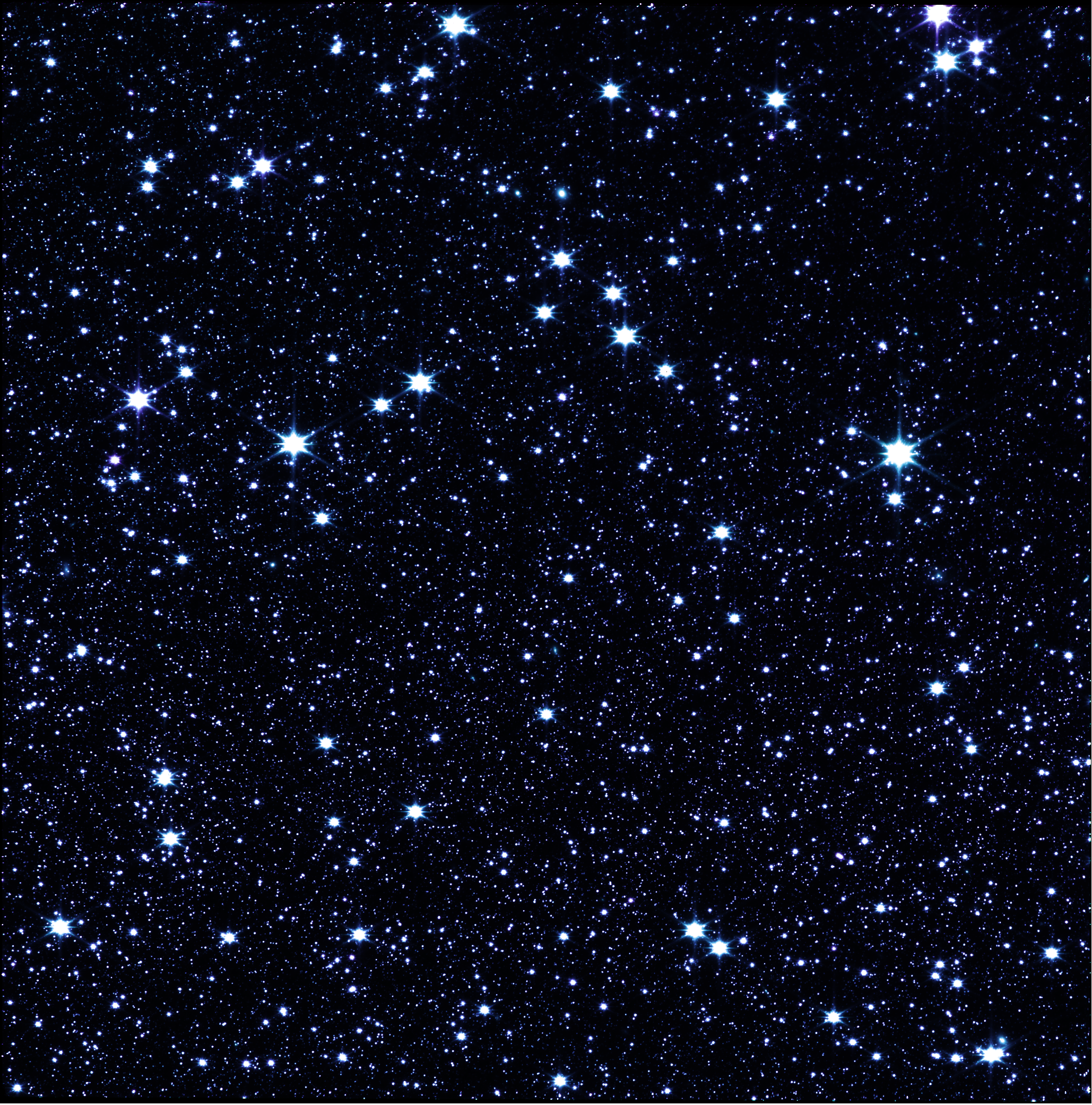
A section of the Large Magellanic Cloud imaged by the James Webb Space Telescope

== See also ==
- Magellanic Stream
