= PGC 16389 =

Irregular galaxy in the constellation Caelum

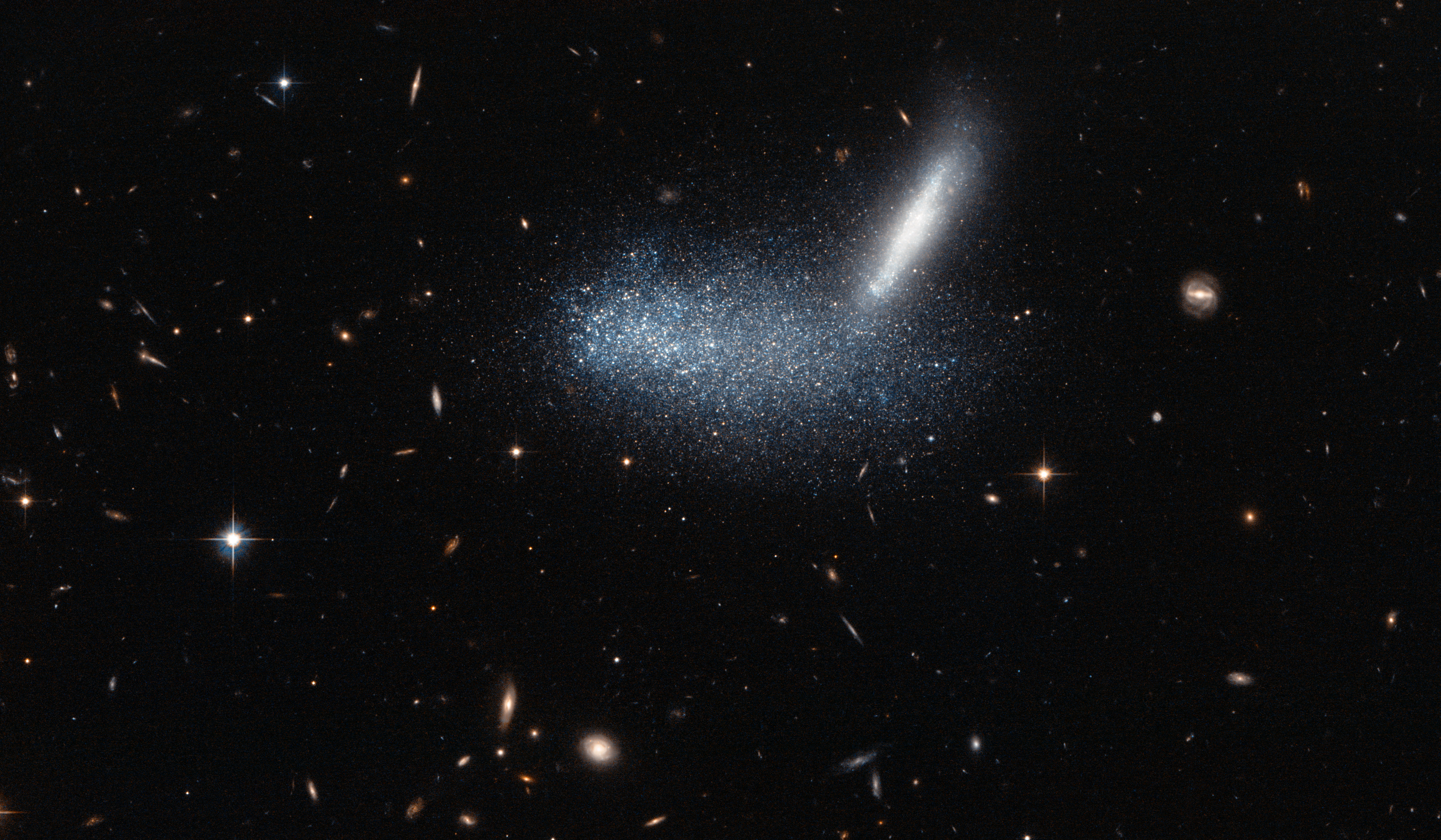
- Image taken using the Hubble Space Telescope

Observation data (J2000 epoch)
- Constellation: Caelum
- Right ascension: 04^{h} 56^{m} 58.7^{s}
- Declination: −42° 48′ 14″
- Redshift: 0.002192 ± 0.000017 km/s
- Galactocentric velocity: 657 ± 5 km/s
- Distance: 6.61 megaparsecs (21.6 Mly)
- Apparent magnitude (B): 14.4

Characteristics
- Type: Irr
- Apparent size (V): 1.3′ × 1.3′

Other designations
- 2MASX J02232199+3211492, ESO 252-IG1, AM 0455-425, PGC 16389

LEDA/PGC 16389 is a Hubble-type dwarf irregular galaxy (dIrr) in the constellation Caelum in the southern sky. It is estimated to be 22 million light-years from the Milky Way and forms an optical galaxy pair with APMBGC 252+125-117.
