= NGC 2020 =

Emission nebula in the constellation Dorado

Emission nebula
- H II region
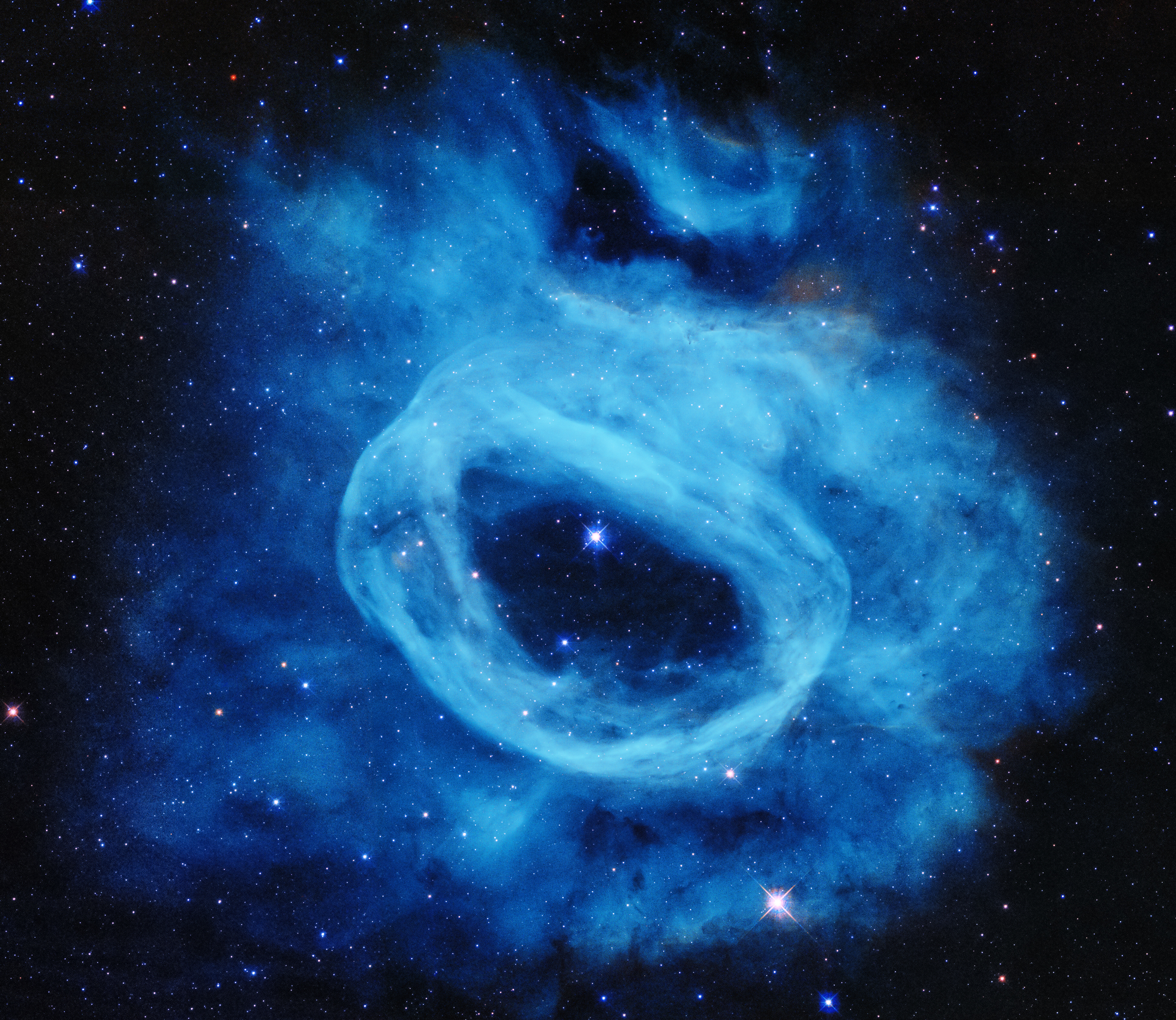
- NGC 2020 as imaged by the Hubble Space Telescope

Observation data: J2000 epoch
- Right ascension: 05^{h} 44^{m} 12.7^{s}
- Declination: −67° 42′ 57″
- Constellation: Dorado
- Designations: GC 1223, ESO 56-148

NGC 2020 is an HII Region surrounding the Wolf-Rayet star BAT99-59. It is located in the Large Magellanic Cloud.

The nebula was discovered on 30 December 1836 by polymath John Herschel. Together with NGC 2014 it makes up the Cosmic Reef.
