= Faint blue galaxy =

Type of galaxy

A faint blue galaxy (FBG) is an inconspicuous, often small galaxy with low surface luminosity. In addition to being dim, they show a remarkably high quantity of sparsely scattered blue stars, but comparatively few red stars, which in most galaxies are by far the most common. They appear as dim, bluish smudges on old photographic plates, with no clear structure or shape, and do not register well on modern electronic cameras, which are more sensitive to red light. They are currently interpreted as small dwarf-irregular satellite-galaxies undergoing a burst of star formation.

== Previously overlooked ==
Although some had been previously photographed as faint smudges in sky surveys, they were first noticed in the 1970s, posing a problem for then-current theories of galaxy formation. FBGs tend to be found in the peripheries of galaxy clusters and as remote satellites of large galaxies, and appear to be a now-finished stage of galactic growth. Any galaxy might appear faint because it is small or because it is far away. Neither explanation, nor any combination, matched the initial FBG observations.

== The first faint blue galaxy problem ==
The faint blue galaxy (FBG) problem in astrophysics first arose with observations starting in 1978 that there were more galaxies with a bolometric magnitude > 22 than then-current theory predicted.

The distribution of these galaxies has since been found to be consistent with models of cosmic inflation, measurements of the cosmic microwave background, and a nonzero cosmological constant; that is, with the existence of the now-accepted dark energy. It thus serves as a confirmation of supernova observations requiring dark energy.

== The second faint blue galaxy problem ==
A second problem arose in 1988, with even deeper observations showing a much greater excess of faint galaxies.

These are now interpreted as dwarf galaxies experiencing large bursts of stellar formation, resulting in blue light from young, massive stars. Thus FBGs are extremely bright for their size and distance.

Most FBGs appear between red-shift z = 0.5–2. It is inferred that they merged with other galaxies and consequently disappeared as separate objects some time in the "recent" cosmological past.
