= Epsilon Doradus =

Star in the constellation Dorado

- Location of ε Doradus (circled)

Observation data Epoch J2000.0 Equinox J2000.0 (ICRS)
- Constellation: Dorado
- Right ascension: 05^{h} 49^{m} 53.52107^{s}
- Declination: −66° 54′ 04.2787″
- Apparent magnitude (V): 5.11

Characteristics
- Evolutionary stage: main sequence
- Spectral type: B6 V
- U−B color index: −0.49
- B−V color index: −0.14
- Variable type: SPB

Astrometry
| Radial velocity (R_{v}) | +15.5±1.6 km/s |
| Proper motion (μ) | RA: −21.81 mas/yr Dec.: +37.55 mas/yr |
| Parallax (π) | 5.68±0.15 mas |
| Distance | 570 ± 20 ly (176 ± 5 pc) |
| Absolute magnitude (M_{V}) | −0.20 |

Details
| Mass | 4.31±0.05 M_{☉} |
| Radius | 3.8±0.6 R_{☉} |
| Luminosity | 556 L_{☉} |
| Surface gravity (log g) | 3.89±0.20 cgs |
| Temperature | 13,212 K |
| Rotational velocity (v sin i) | 17 km/s |
| Age | 210 Myr |

Other designations
- ε Dor, NSV 2693, CD−66°351, GC 7384, HD 39844, HIP 27534, HR 2064, SAO 249368, 2MASS J05495356-6654041, Gaia DR2 4659664312127365632

Database references
| SIMBAD | data |

Epsilon Doradus is a solitary star located in the southern constellation of Dorado. Its name is a Bayer designation that is Latinized from ε Doradus and abbreviated Epsilon Dor or ε Dor. This star is visible to the naked eye with an apparent visual magnitude of 5.11. Based upon an annual parallax shift of 5.68 mas as measured from Earth, it is located roughly 570 light years from the Sun. At that distance, the visual magnitude of the star is diminished by an extinction factor of 0.09 due to interstellar dust.

This is a B-type main sequence star with a stellar classification of B6 V. It is a slowly pulsating B-type star with a mean longitudinal magnetic field strength of −64±26 G. With 4.31 times the mass of the Sun and 3.8 times the Sun's radius, it is about 85% of the way through its main sequence lifetime. The star is an estimated 210 million years old and is spinning with a projected rotational velocity of 17 km/s. Epsilon Doradus radiates 556 times the solar luminosity from its photosphere at an effective temperature of 13,212 K.
