= List of citizen science projects =

Citizen science projects are activities sponsored by a wide variety of organizations so non-scientists can meaningfully contribute to scientific research.

== Precis ==
Activities vary widely from transcribing old ship logbooks to digitize the data as part of the Old Weather project to observing and counting birds at home or in the field for eBird. Participation can be as simple as playing a computer game for a project called Eyewire that may help scientists learn more about retinal neurons. It can also be more in depth, such as when citizens collect water quality data over time to assess the health of local waters, or help discover and name new species of insects. An emerging branch of Citizen Science are Community Mapping projects that utilize smartphone and tablet technology. For example, TurtleSAT is a community mapping project that is mapping freshwater turtle deaths throughout Australia.

This list of citizen science projects involves projects that engage all age groups. There are projects specifically aimed at the younger age demographic like iTechExplorers which was created by a 14 year old in the UK to assess the effects of bedtime technology on the body's circadian rhythm and can be completed in a classroom setting. Other projects like AgeGuess focus on the senior demographics and enable the elderly to upload photos of themselves so the public can guess different ages.

Lists of citizen science projects may change. For example, the Old Weather project website indicates that as of January 10, 2015, 51% of the logs were completed. When that project reaches 100 percent, it will move to the completed list.

== Worldwide ==
Citizen scientists anywhere in the world can participate in these projects.

Start	End	Project name	Discipline(s)	Sponsoring organization(s)	Notes
2019	2020	Hubble Asteroid Hunters	Astronomy	Zooniverse, ESA ESDC	Research Paper, Zooniverse
2011	2012	Ice Investigators (Note: Formerly Ice Hunters, a project to identify potential targets in the Kuiper belt for the New Horizons spacecraft after it completes its mission to Pluto.)	Astronomy	CosmoQuest.org (Note: CosmoQuest is sponsored by NASA in partnership with the Astrosphere New Media Association, the STEM Center, UniverseToday, Astronomers without Borders, the Planetary Society, the Ward Beecher Planetarium, the Galileo Teachers Training Program, Swinburne Astronomy Online, Dark Skies, Bright Kids, the Canadian Astronomy Data Centre and its member organizations, the Galileoscope Project and several NASA projects.)	
2011	2012	Moon Mappers: Million crater challenge (Note: Over a million craters were identified and mapped in late 2012. As of March 2012, 1,207,486 craters have been identified and mapped by the Moon Mappers parent project that continues.)	Planetary Astronomy	CosmoQuest.org	
2018	Ongoing	Mosquito Alert	Public Health	Unknown	
2022	ongoing	Spritacular	Meteorology	NASA, Catholic University of America	
2022	ongoing	Jovian Vortex Hunter	Astronomy	NASA, Southwest Research Institute, Zooniverse	
2023	ongoing	Deciphering Secrets: Unlocking the Manuscripts of Medieval Spain	History	University of Colorado, Zooniverse, University of Madrid, European Union's Seventh FPRTD	
2022	ongoing	Cloudspotting On Mars	Astronomy, Planetary Research, Weather	NASA, Zooniverse	
2023	ongoing	The Daily Minor Planet	Astronomy, Minor Planet Research, Asteroids	NASA, Zooniverse	

== Regional ==
These projects require that citizen scientists be local to a region of study.

=== Asia ===
Start	End	Project name	Discipline(s)	Sponsoring organization(s)	Country (or region)	Notes
1957	ongoing	Hong Kong Birdwatching Society	Biodiversity	Unknown	Hong Kong	
1993	ongoing	Bird Conservation Society of Thailand	Biodiversity	IUCN, Toyota	Thailand	
2012	2012	Citizen Sparrow	Ornithology	Bombay Natural History Society	India	
2012	Unknown	FLOAT Beijing	Air Quality, Environmental science	Black Rock Arts Foundation, AWESOME Foundation	China	
2012	ongoing	WildMentor	Biodiversity	Unknown	Bangladesh	
2013	ongoing	RAD@home	Astronomy	RAD@home Astronomy Collaboratory and many Indian research institutes	India	focus on extragalactic radio astronomy
2015	ongoing	Bauhinia Genome	Biodiversity	Unknown	Hong Kong	
2017	2020	Respirer Living Sciences	Air Quality, Environmental science	IIT Kanpur, Shaki Sustainable Energy Foundation (SSEF)	India	
2017	Unknown	AirBox	Air Quality, Environmental science	Unknown	Taiwan and South	
2018	2021	CleanAir	Air Quality, Environmental science	American University of Yangon (Connect University), Phandeeyar	Myammar	
2019	Unknown	DustBoy	Air Quality, Environmental science	Unknown	Thailand	
2020	Unknown	PakAirQuality	Air Quality, Environmental science, Public Health, Urban Planning	Research Grants Council (RGC) of Hong Kong and Jiangsu Provincial Department of Education, China.	Pakistan	
2021	ongoing	Hong Kong Jellyfish Project	Biodiversity	Unknown	Hong Kong	
2021	ongoing	Herptile Roadkill Study (Project Runover)	Herpetology, Roadkill, Habitat fragmentation Environmental science	Herpetological Society of Singapore	Singapore	

=== Australasia ===
Start	End	Project name	Discipline(s)	Sponsoring organization(s)	Country (or region)	Notes
2010	2010	Big Sleep Survey	Sleep	National Science Week Australia, Australian Broadcasting Corporation	Australia	Big Sleep Survey
2016	2016	South Australia Great Koala Count 2	Ecology	Discovery Circle, University of South Australia, University of Adelaide	South Australia	
2011	2011	The Multi-tasking Test	Cognitive science	National Science Week Australia, Australian Broadcasting Corporation, Queensland Brain Institute	Australia	Multi-tasking Test
2015	2015	Peninsular Malaysia Butterfly Count	Lepidoptery	Museum of Zoology, University of Malaya	Malaysia	Results published
2012	2012	Sound Check Australia	Audiology	National Science Week Australia, Australian Broadcasting Corporation, National Acoustic Laboratories	Australia	Sound Check Australia
2001	2010	Value of Patient Testimony	Public Health Research	Case Health Pty Ltd Outcomes: (1) eBook: 'Those Who Suffer Much, Know Much' 2010 https://webarchive.nla.gov.au/aest/20100925000000/http://pandora.nla.gov.au/pan/104801/20100925-0000/2010.pdf (2) Spurred significant increase in scientific research into LDN (low dose naltrexone) https://www.ncbi.nlm.nih.gov/pubmed/?term=%22low-dose+naltrexone%22%5BALL+FIELDS%5D+NOT+(dependence%5BTitle%5D)+NOT+(dependent%5BTitle%5D)+NOT+(oxycodone%5BTitle%5D)+NOT+(withdrawal%5BTitle%5D)+NOT+(cocaine%5BTitle%5D)+NOT+(morphine%5BTitle%5D)+NOT+(itch-related%5BTitle%5D)+NOT+(drinking%5BTitle%5D)+NOT+(alcohol%5BTitle%5D)+NOT+(cigarette%5BTitle%5D)+NOT+(smoker%5BTitle%5D)+NOT+(smoking%5BTitle%5D)+NOT+(smokers%5BTitle%5D)+NOT+(nicotine%5BTitle%5D)+NOT+(detoxification%5BTitle%5D)+NOT+(gambling%5BTitle%5D)+NOT+(self-biting%5BTitle%5D)	Australia	Spurred dramatic increase in scientific research

=== Europe ===
Start	End	Project name	Discipline(s)	Sponsoring organization(s)	Country (or region)	Notes
2009	2013	BBC Lab UK	Psychology	BBC, BBC	UK	Discontinued in 2018, see BBC Lab UK
1979	ongoing	Big Garden Birdwatch	Ornithology	Royal Society for the Protection of Birds	UK	Cited to be the world's largest citizen science project
2025	2026	Aurora Éire	Space weather, Aurora	Dublin Institute for Advanced Studies	Ireland	

=== North America ===
Start	End	Project name	Discipline(s)	Sponsoring organization(s)	Country (or region)	Notes
1997	2007	Birdhouse Network	Ornithology	Cornell Lab of Ornithology	US	(Note: Formerly The Birdhouse Network which only monitored nests in bird boxes and similar artificial cavities. NestWatch is a new project that collects observations of open nests as well.)
1994	2011	House Finch Disease Survey	Ornithology	Cornell Lab of Ornithology	North America	(Note: Per the project website, this project was absorbed into the current FeederWatch project.)
2010	2014	Maryland Amphibian and Reptile Atlas	Herpetology	Natural History Society of Maryland, Inc., Maryland Department of Natural Resources	US (MD)	
2015	2015	McMaster Postcard Project	Archives, Social Science, History	William Ready Division of Archives and Research Collections at McMaster University Library	Canada	McMaster Postcard Project
2023	ongoing	Volunteer Water Quality Monitoring at Elkhorn Slough	Water Quality, Environment	NOAA, California Fish and Wildlife, Central Coast Regional Water Quality Control Board, Monterey County Consolidated Chemistry Lab, Zooniverse	California	
2014	ongoing	Aurorasaurus - Reporting Auroras from the Ground up	Space weather, Aurora	New Mexico Consortium	United States	

== See also ==
- Participatory monitoring
- List of grid computing projects
- List of volunteer computing projects
- List of free and open-source Android applications
