= Kevin Schawinski =

Swiss astrophysicist

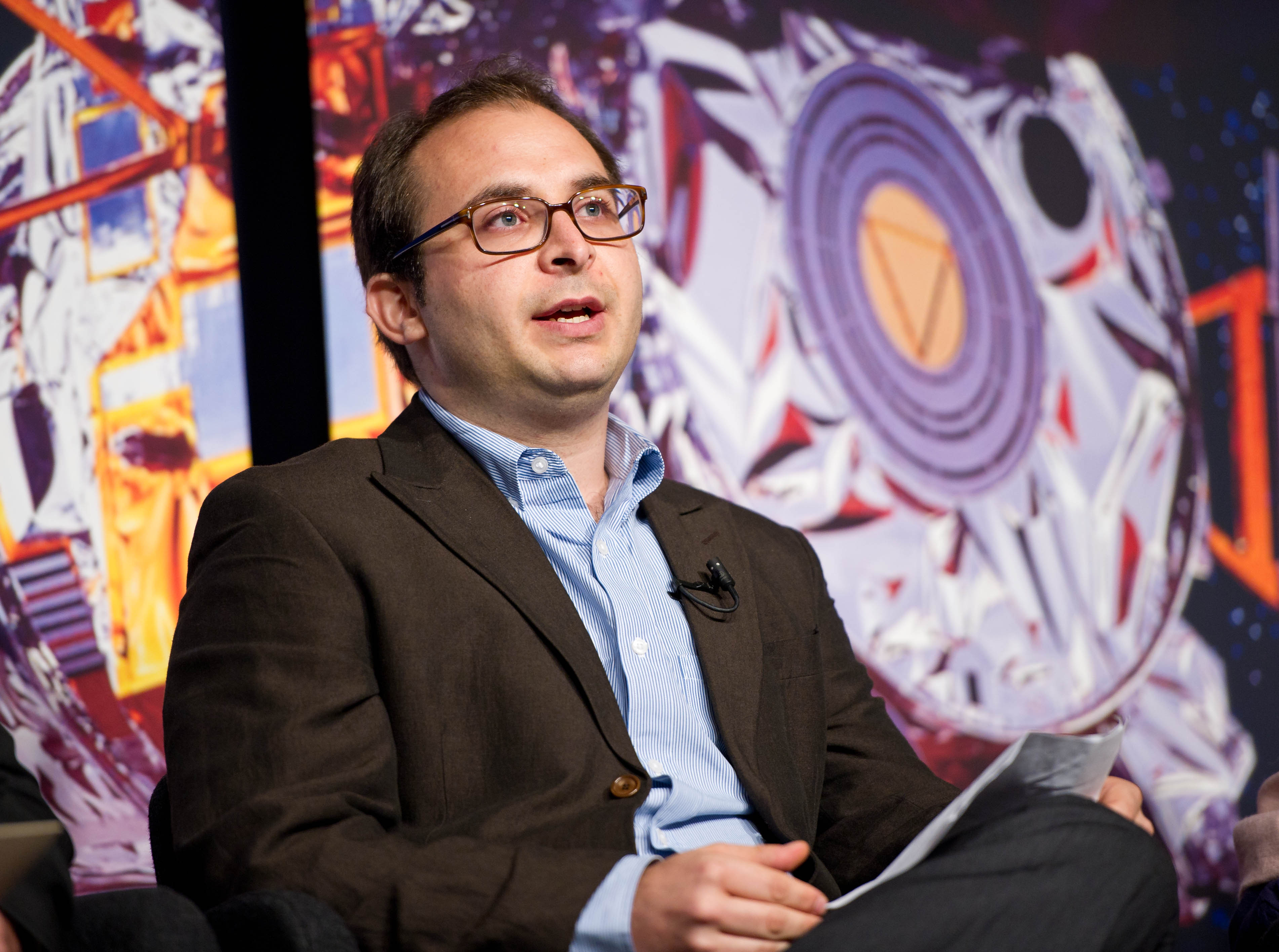
- Born: 28 April 1981 (age 45); Zürich
- Citizenship: Swiss and German
- Education: Cornell University; Oxford University
- Known for: Galaxy Zoo
- Awards: RAS Michael Penston Prize, EAS MERAC Prize
- Scientific career
- Workplaces: University of Oxford; Yale University; ETH Zürich
- Doctoral advisor: Sukyoung Yi
- Website: Research group homepage

Kevin Schawinski (April 28, 1981 in Zürich) is a Swiss astrophysicist. He was a professor at ETH Zurich (the Swiss Federal Institute of Technology) in Zürich.

== Early life ==
Kevin Schawinski grew up in both Switzerland and Germany. His father is Swiss media entrepreneur Roger Schawinski.

== Education ==
Kevin Schawinski graduated from Cornell University in the United States in 2004 with degrees in both physics and mathematics. Following that, he went to the University of Oxford, where he was a fellow at Christ Church College and later the "Henry Skynner Junior Research Fellow" at Balliol College. He was awarded the Royal Astronomical Society's 2008 Michael Penston Prize for his doctoral thesis "The Star Formation History of Early-type Galaxies". He received his D.Phil. in 2008.

While a graduate student at Oxford, Schawinski founded the citizen science project Galaxy Zoo along with researcher Chris Lintott, which later became the Zooniverse.

== Career ==
From 2008 to 2012, Schawinski was a postdoctoral research associate at Yale University and in 2009 became a NASA Einstein Fellow. His research at Yale included studies of black holes, galaxy formation, and co-founding the citizen science project Planet Hunters.

In 2012, he became a professor in the Institute for Astronomy at ETH Zürich in Switzerland. He is the secretary of the Swiss Society of Astrophysics and Astronomy, the professional society of astronomers in Switzerland. The Gottlieb Duttweiler Institute named him one of the "Thought Leaders" of Switzerland in 2016. In 2017, he was awarded the European Astronomical Society's MERAC Prize as the best junior researcher in observational astrophysics. In 2017, he launched the Space.ml platform with Ce Zhang to apply artificial intelligence to astrophysics research.

Together with colleagues from ETH Zurich and the University of Zurich, he founded the Citizen Science Center Zurich.

Schawinski is the CEO of Modulos, a company which has developed A GRC platform for artificial intelligence to help organizations comply to new laws and regulations, such as the European Union's Artificial Intelligence Act and the NIST AI Risk management framework. Modulos is a member of the NIST AI Safety Institute Consortium, advising the U.S. government on AI regulation.

In 2020, Schawniski discussed the future of Modulos with Guy Spier

== Research ==
Schawinski has worked on a range of topics from galaxy evolution, black hole astrophysics, citizen science and artificial intelligence. He has published over 200 peer reviewed articles, including 6 in Nature and Science. His publications have been cited over 16,000 times.

== See also ==
- Hanny's Voorwerp
- Pea galaxy
- Reinventing Discovery
