= SDSS J150904.22+043441.8 =

Type 2 quasar in the constellation Virgo

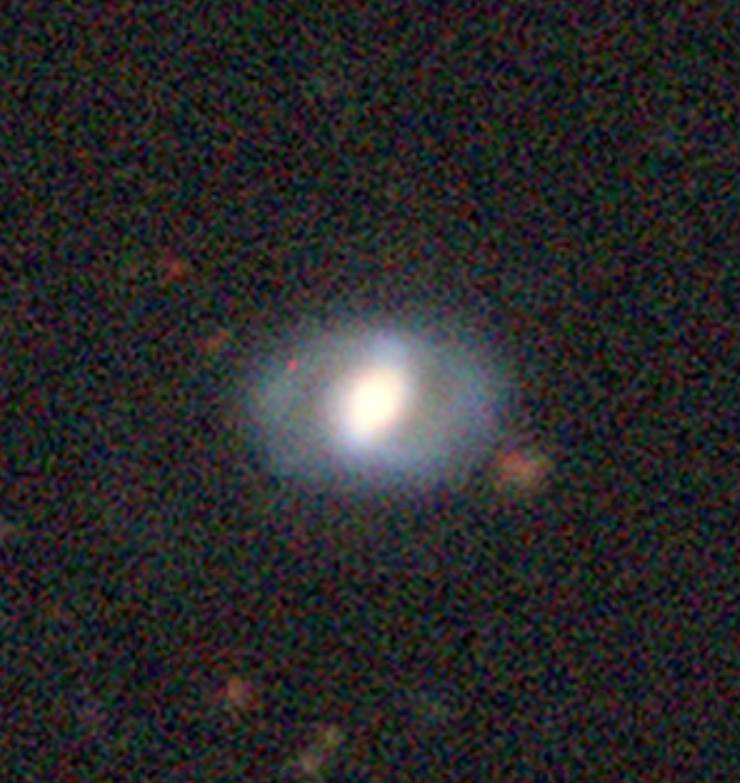
- SDSS J150904.22+043441.8 captured by DESI Legacy Surveys

Observation data (J2000.0 epoch)
- Constellation: Virgo
- Right ascension: 15^{h} 09^{m} 04.21^{s}
- Declination: +04° 34′ 41.79″
- Redshift: 0.111467
- Heliocentric radial velocity: 33,417 km/s ± 11
- Distance: 1.490 Gly
- Apparent magnitude (V): 18.90

Characteristics
- Type: QSO2
- Size: ~159,000 ly (48.8 kpc) (estimated)

Other designations
- IRAS F15065+0446, NVSS J150904+043441, LEDA 1270205, 2MASS J15090421+0434417, 2MASX J15090422+0434415

SDSS J150904.22+043441.8 is a type 2 quasar located in the constellation of Virgo. The redshift of the galaxy is (z) 0.111 and it was first discovered in the IRAS survey in 1990. The total doubly ionized oxygen luminosity of the galaxy is estimated to be 10^{8.56} L_{☉} and is also classified as a luminous infrared galaxy based on its total infrared luminosity of 11.6 L_{☉}.

== Description ==
SDSS J150904.22+043441.8 is classified as a barred spiral galaxy of type SBa based on a study made by the Galaxy Zoo. The position angle of the galaxy is estimated to be 94° while the inclination is around 44°. The galaxy also appears as disturbed based on broad-band optical imaging, indicating either an interaction or even a past galaxy merger. The total star formation rate of the galaxy is estimated to be 34 M_{☉} per year based on the infrared luminosity. The supermassive black hole inside the center of the galaxy, like many others, is estimated to be 8.27 ± 0.76 M_{☉}.

The galaxy has a compact doubly ionized oxygen [O III] disk structure that is around three kiloparsecs in radius, with a feature described as fish-like towards the southeast from the galaxy. A kinematic map has also revealed it has gas rotations with negative velocity gradients on the eastern side while the western side has positive velocity gradients. Outflows have also been detected in the galaxy, with the mass of the outflows estimated to be 9 × 10^{5} M_{☉} and around 0.46 M_{☉} per year. There also molecular outflows detected, with kinetic power reaching 4.9 × 10^{39} erg s^{−1}. Observations made by the Atacama Large Millimeter Array (ALMA) also found the outflows are towards the northwest side of the galaxy at a position angle of 40° and by 3.8 kiloparsecs.

A study published in 2022, has found the continuum emission of the galaxy has a peculiar morphology. It is known to follow in an inner structure of the molecular gas that is shaped into an oblong, but in the central region of the galaxy, there is an arc-like structure that does not follow the same path as the gas. Two spiral arms have also been discovered in the galaxy, being developed from inside the stellar bar region and extending outwards by four kiloparsecs northwest and in the position angle of -30° southeast.

In 2025, carbon oxide, hydrogen and water, as well as aliphatic grain band absorption elements were detected in the galaxy. This suggests the nucleus of the galaxy is extremely obscured.
