= Grace Wolf-Chase =

American astronomer and science educator

Grace Annamarie Wolf-Chase (née Wolf) is an American astronomer and science educator, working as a senior scientist and senior education and communication specialist at the Planetary Science Institute. Her research interests include star formation and planet formation. She is also interested in citizen science, and was one of the creators of The Milky Way Project, searching for stellar-wind bubbles in the Milky Way. Her work has also involved writing and communicating about the relation between astronomy and religion.

== Education and career ==
Wolf-Chase majored in physics at Cornell University, graduating in 1981. After working as an operator of the ARO 12m Radio Telescope for the National Radio Astronomy Observatory at the Kitt Peak National Observatory, she completed a Ph.D. in astronomy at the University of Arizona in 1992. Her dissertation, Dense gas in the Monoceros OB1 dark cloud and its relationship to star formation, was jointly advised by Charles Lada and Christopher Walker.

She was a postdoctoral researcher at the NASA Ames Research Center and University of California, Riverside, then worked from 1998 to 2020 as a researcher in astronomy and astrophysics at the University of Chicago and as an astronomer at the Adler Planetarium in Chicago. Since 2009 she has also been affiliated with the Zygon Center for Religion and Science at the Lutheran School of Theology at Chicago. She took her present position as a senior scientist and senior education and communication specialist at the Planetary Science Institute in 2020.

== Recognition ==
Wolf-Chase was named a Fellow of the American Astronomical Society in 2024, "for outstanding and sustained work to bring the wonders of astronomical research to the general public, especially to diverse religious communities; and for significant investigations into bipolar molecular outflows within star-forming regions through multi-wavelength observations and analyses".

== Personal life ==
Wolf-Chase identifies as Lutheran, specifically as a member of the Evangelical Lutheran Church in America. She has three children, all born during her NASA/Ames postdoctoral years.
