= SETILive =

SETILive was an online project of Zooniverse that utilized live participants to analyze radio telescope data in real time to recognize patterns to find extraterrestrial intelligences (ETI's). The project ceased live operations on 12 October 2014, but still allows archival analysis.

== Project ==
The project was launched in February 2012 as part of Jill Tarter's 2009 TED Prize Wish. SETILive uses data provided by the Allen Telescope Array and presents it visually so that the public can collectively search for radio signals. The project focuses on radio frequencies that automated detection systems ignore due to the prevalence of man-made noise. Jill Tarter hopes that human analysts will be able to detect low signal-to-noise transmissions which confuse computers. The telescope scans the zone between a known star and a known planet where liquid water is possible. This is called the habitable zone. The website displays one to three different scans of an area of space. Its energy is measured and put into a waterfall display. Users must identify the areas of high energy—signals—by making two points through which a line is drawn. Users classify signals as: broken, continuous, or parallel. Users then must classify the signal as: erratic, wide, or narrow. Many of the signals are just satellites that give off energy.

== Decoys ==
The makers of SETILive intentionally put some false positives in. Sometimes, when a user clicks "done", a red line would identify the simulated ETI signal.

== See also ==
- Drake equation
- Radio astronomy
- SETI

Zooniverse projects:

- The Daily Minor Planet
- Asteroid Zoo
- Backyard Worlds
- Disk Detective
- Galaxy Zoo
- Old Weather
- Planet Hunters
- The Milky Way Project
