= Asteroid Zoo =

Citizen science project

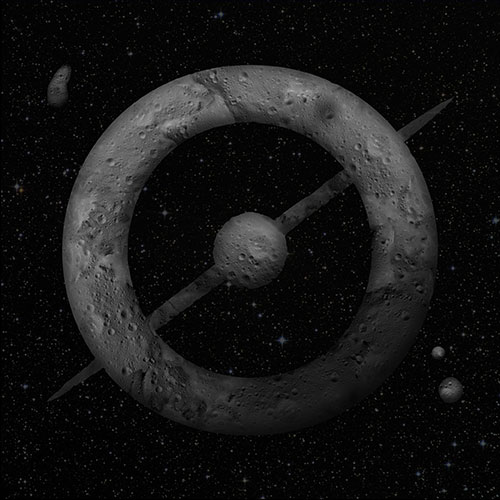
- Website type: Citizen science project
- Available in: English, Polish
- Creators: Planetary Resources; C. Lewicki, M. Beasley, et al.
- Website: asteroidzoo.org
- Commercial: No
- Registration: Yes, but not mandatory
- Launched: 24 June 2014
- Current status: Paused

Asteroid Zoo was a citizen science project run by the Zooniverse and Planetary Resources, to use volunteer classifications to find unknown asteroids using old Catalina Sky Survey data. The main goals of the project were to search for undiscovered asteroids in order to protect the planet by locating potentially harmful near-Earth asteroids, locate targets for future asteroid mining, study the Solar System, and study the potential uses and advantages of crowdsourcing of astronomical data analysis. The project was created along with the ARKYD project through Kickstarter in 2014 and was funded with around 1.5 million dollars raised.

In 2016, the Asteroid Zoo community exhausted the publicly available data, and the experiment was indefinitely paused. Asteroid Zoo produced several scientific publications during its run.

== See also ==
Zooniverse projects:

- The Daily Minor Planet
- Backyard Worlds
- Disk Detective
- Galaxy Zoo
- Old Weather
- Planet Hunters
- SETILive
- The Milky Way Project
