= Karen Masters =

Astrophysicist

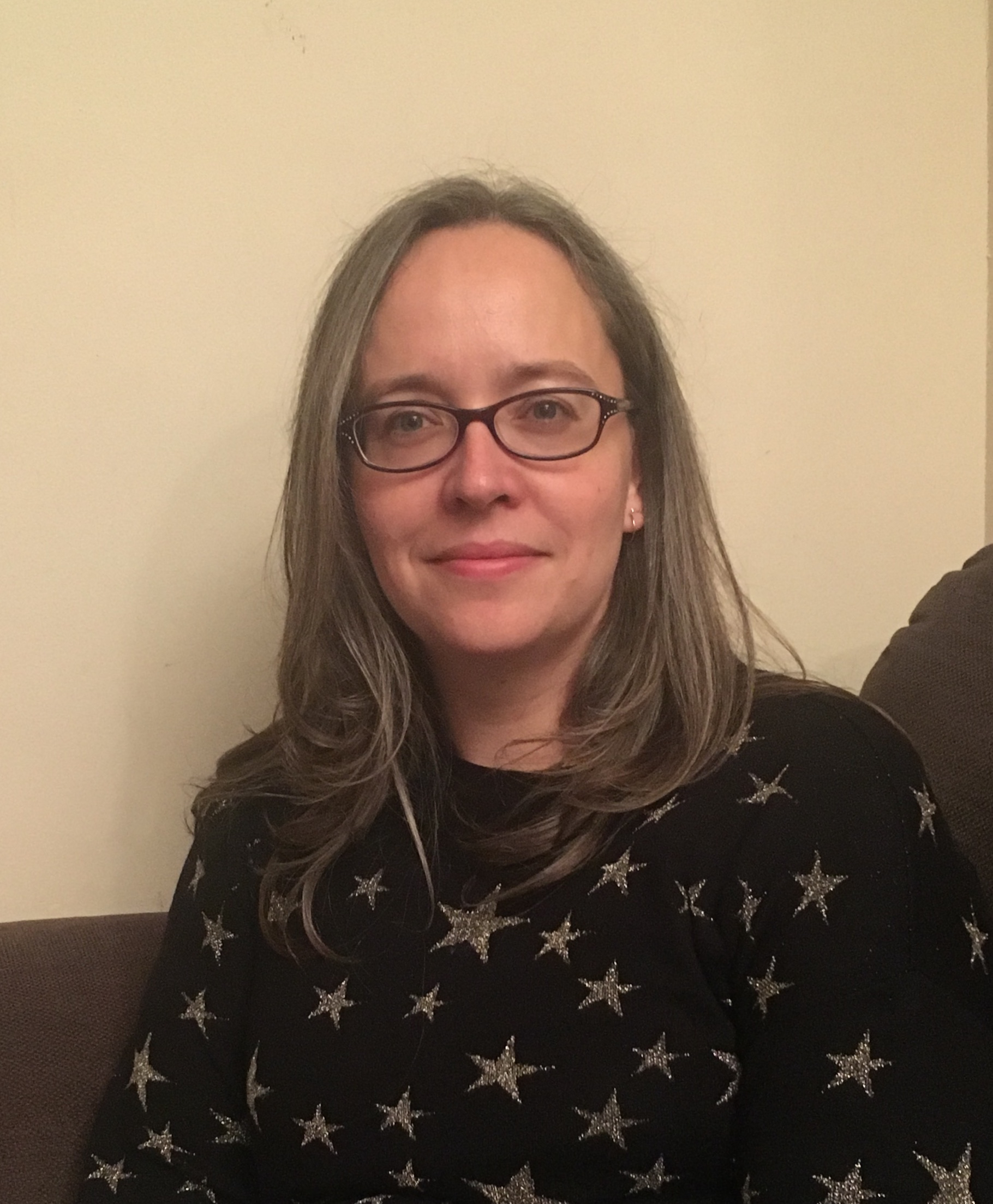
- Born: 1979 (age 46–47)
- Education: University of Oxford
- Organization: Haverford College
- Known for: Astrophysics, formation and evolution, Galaxy Zoo

Karen Masters (born 1979) is an Astrophysicist and Full Professor of Astrophysics in Haverford College, Pennsylvania exploring galaxy formation. She is also the project scientist for the citizen science project Galaxy Zoo, and uses the classifications to study the evolution of galaxies.

== Education ==
Masters was born in Birmingham and attended King Edward VI College, Nuneaton. She completed a BSc in Physics at the University of Oxford in 2000. She received a PhD in Astronomy from Cornell University in 2005, entitled "Galaxy flows in and around the Local Supercluster", under the supervision of Martha Haynes and Riccardo Giovanelli.

== Research ==
In 2005 Masters moved to Harvard University to work as a postdoctoral researcher with John Huchra on a project to make the most complete map of the local Universe. Masters "unveiled the most complete 3-D map of the local universe (out to a distance of 380 million light-years) ever created" in 2011 at the 218th meeting of the American Astronomical Society. The map was created using data from the Two-Micron All-Sky Survey.

She moved to the Institute of Cosmology and Gravitation at the University of Portsmouth in October 2008. She was appointed the Gruber Foundation IAU Fellow in 2008. In 2010 Masters was awarded a Leverhulme Early Career Fellowship, for a project entitled "Do bars kill spiral galaxies?". She was promoted to Senior Lecturer in 2014 and Associate Professor in 2015. She has been working on extragalactic astronomy, and in 2018 was appointed as Associate Professor at Haverford College in Pennsylvania.

Masters is the Project Spokesperson for the Sloan Digital Sky Survey.

== Public engagement ==
Masters coordinates the research scientists for Galaxy Zoo, a crowd-sourced galaxy classification project. She has appeared on the BBC Sky At Night.

She coordinated the She's An Astronomer page for Galaxy Zoo, collating the stories of women from astronomy. In 2014 Masters won the Women of the Future Award for Science. That year she was listed as one of the BBC's top 100 women.
