= Gems of the Galaxy Zoos =

Astronomy project

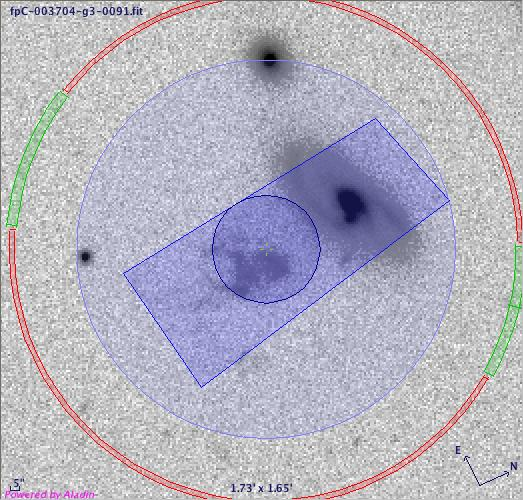
Zoo Gems image logo

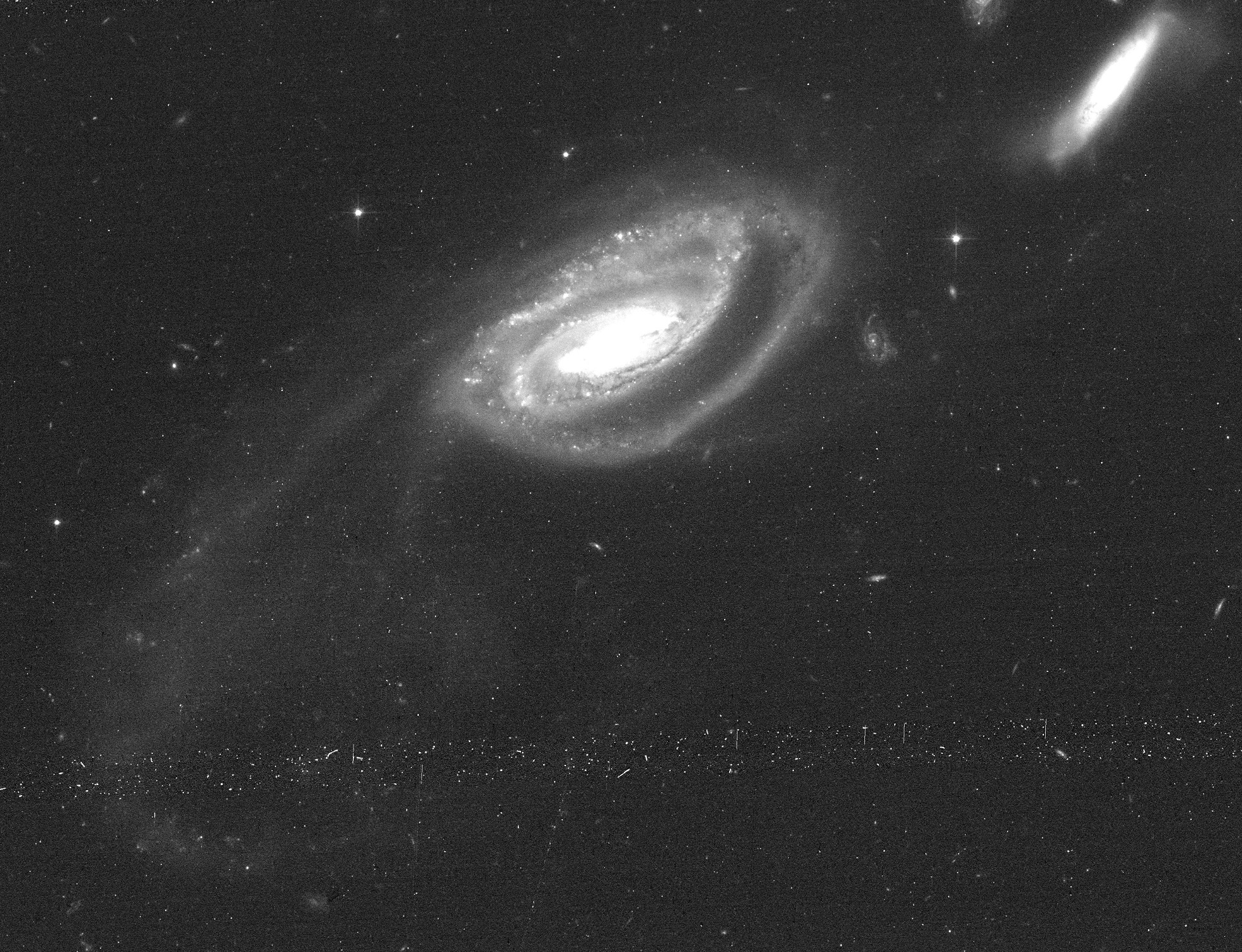
UGC-00240

Gems of the Galaxy Zoos (Zoogems) was a gap-filler project which used the Hubble Space Telescope to take images of unusual objects found by volunteers classifying data from both Galaxy Zoo (GZ) and Radio Galaxy Zoo (RGZ). Between the HSTs' main observations, there is a short time that objects within that field of view can be imaged using gaps which last approximately 12 - 25 mins. The Zoogems project sought to use those small observation gaps to image 300 candidates taken from the two Zoos in order to better study and comprehend them. Starting observations in May 2018, HST Proposal 15445 had by the end of September 2023 imaged 193 of the 300 candidates with many of them having near 11 minute exposures.

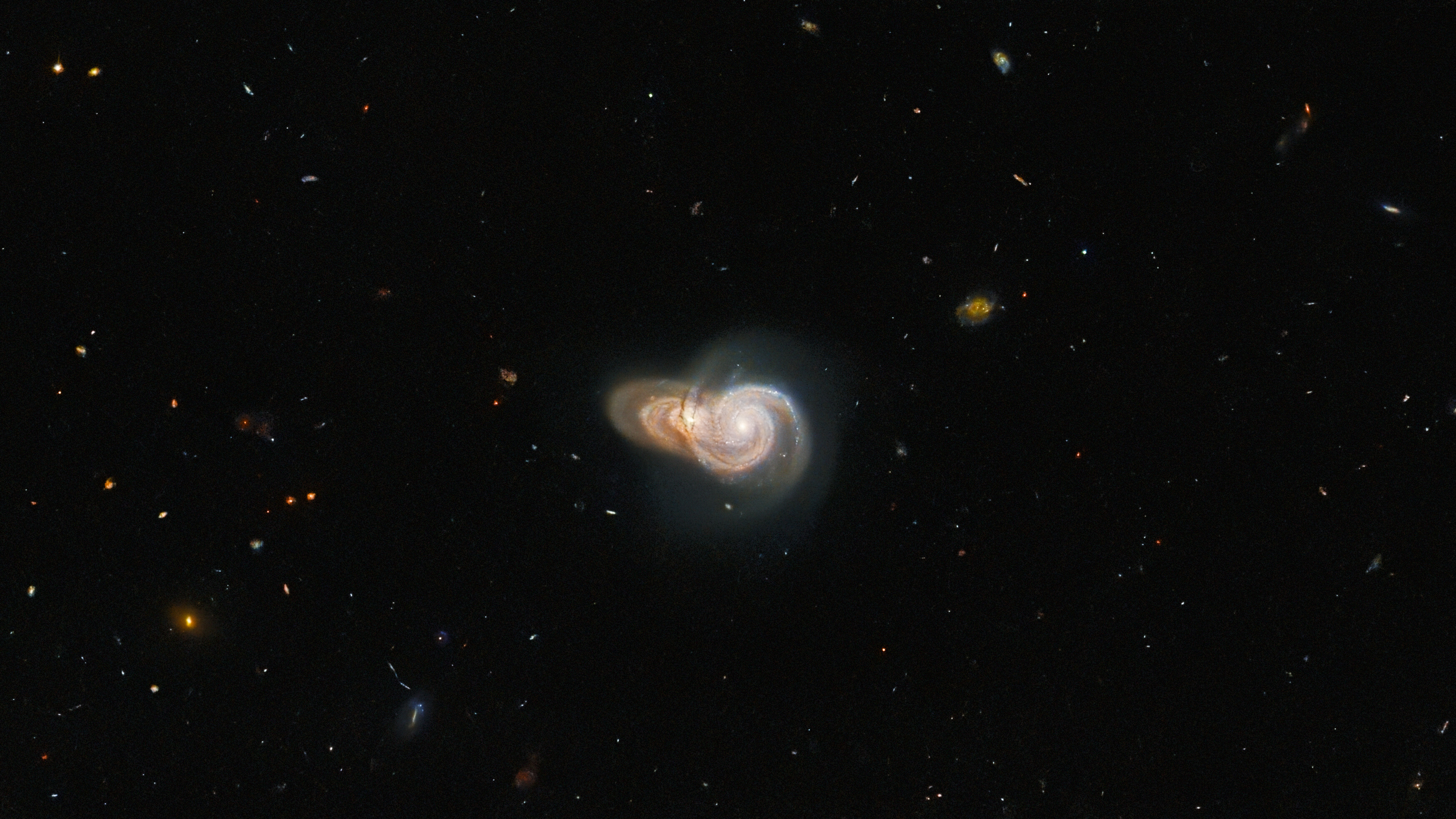
SDSS J115331 and LEDA 2073461, overlapping galaxies

== Background ==
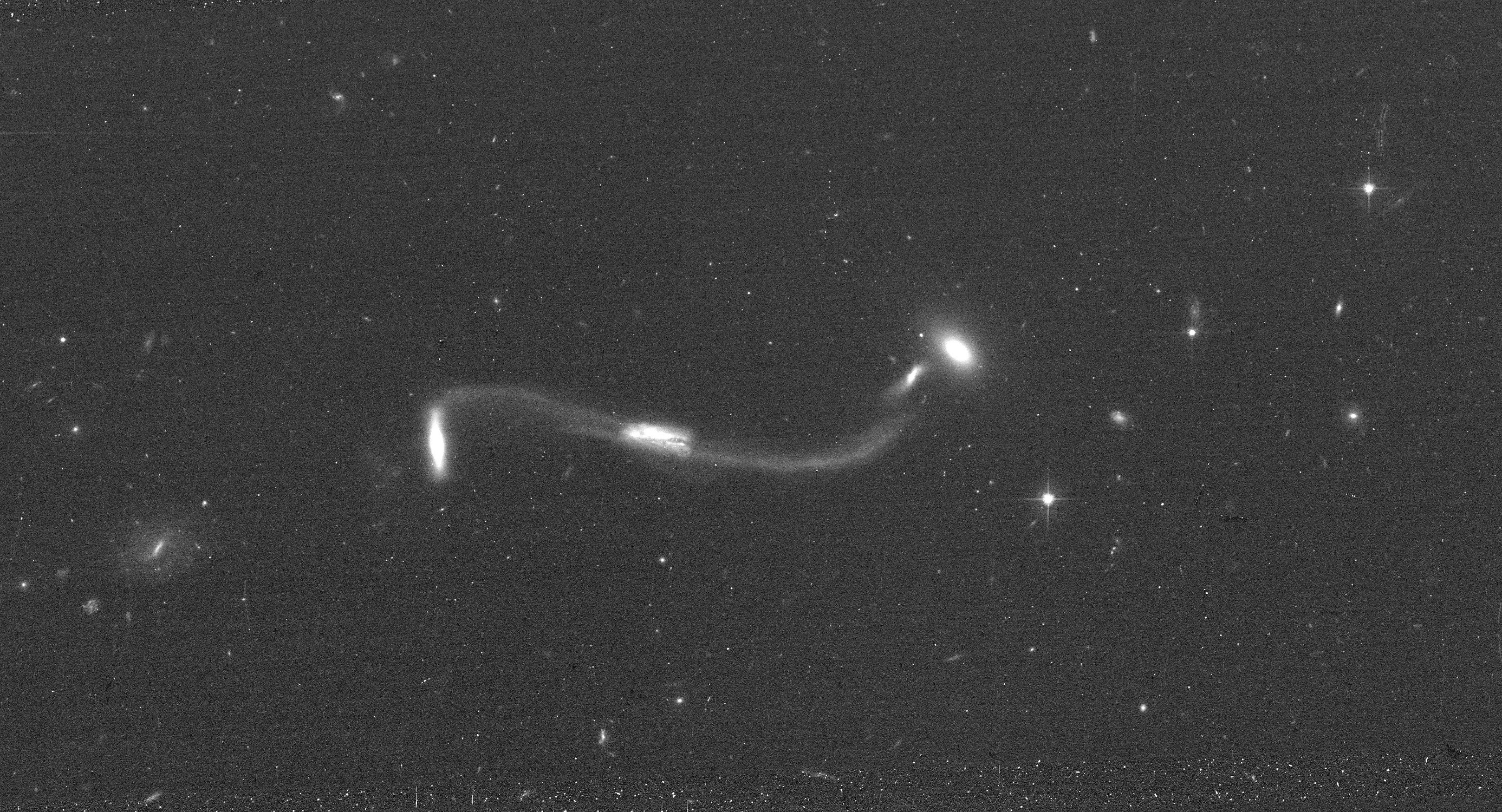
SDSS-000415.42+032301.7, the 'Violin Clef' merger.

GZ is an ongoing crowdsourced astronomy project which invites people to assist in the morphological classification of a large number of galaxies. Initially, many of the objects that were imaged had been posted on the GZ Forum and Talk pages from Summer 2007 through various versions until 2017.

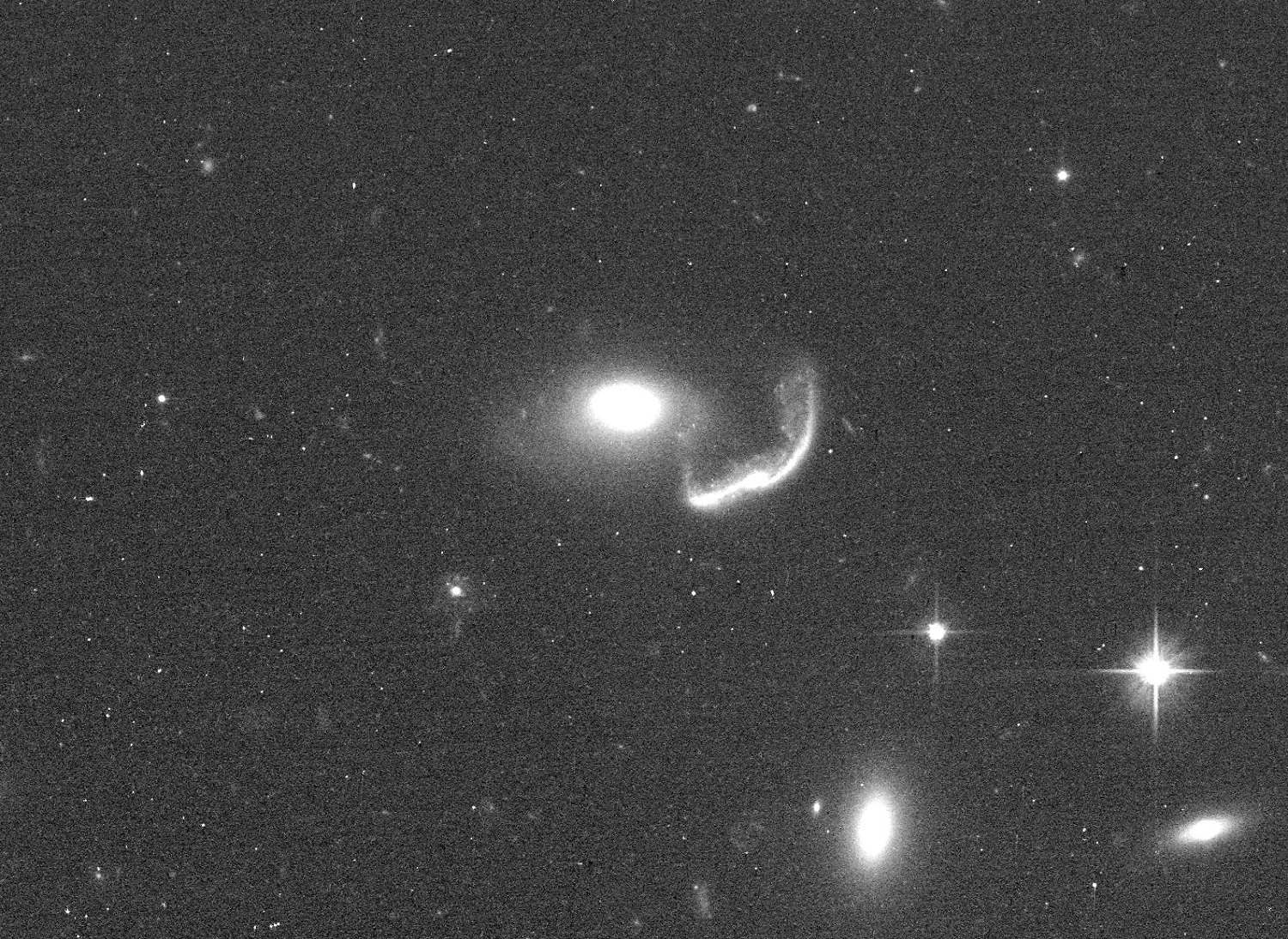
SDSS-095346.77-012746.1, is described as a merger or interaction.

The project Radio Galaxy Zoo started in December 2013, seeking to locate supermassive black holes. The science team wanted to identify black hole/jet pairs and associate them with their host galaxies. As a result of citizens' classifications, many unusual candidates visible in radio frequencies were flagged for further studies.

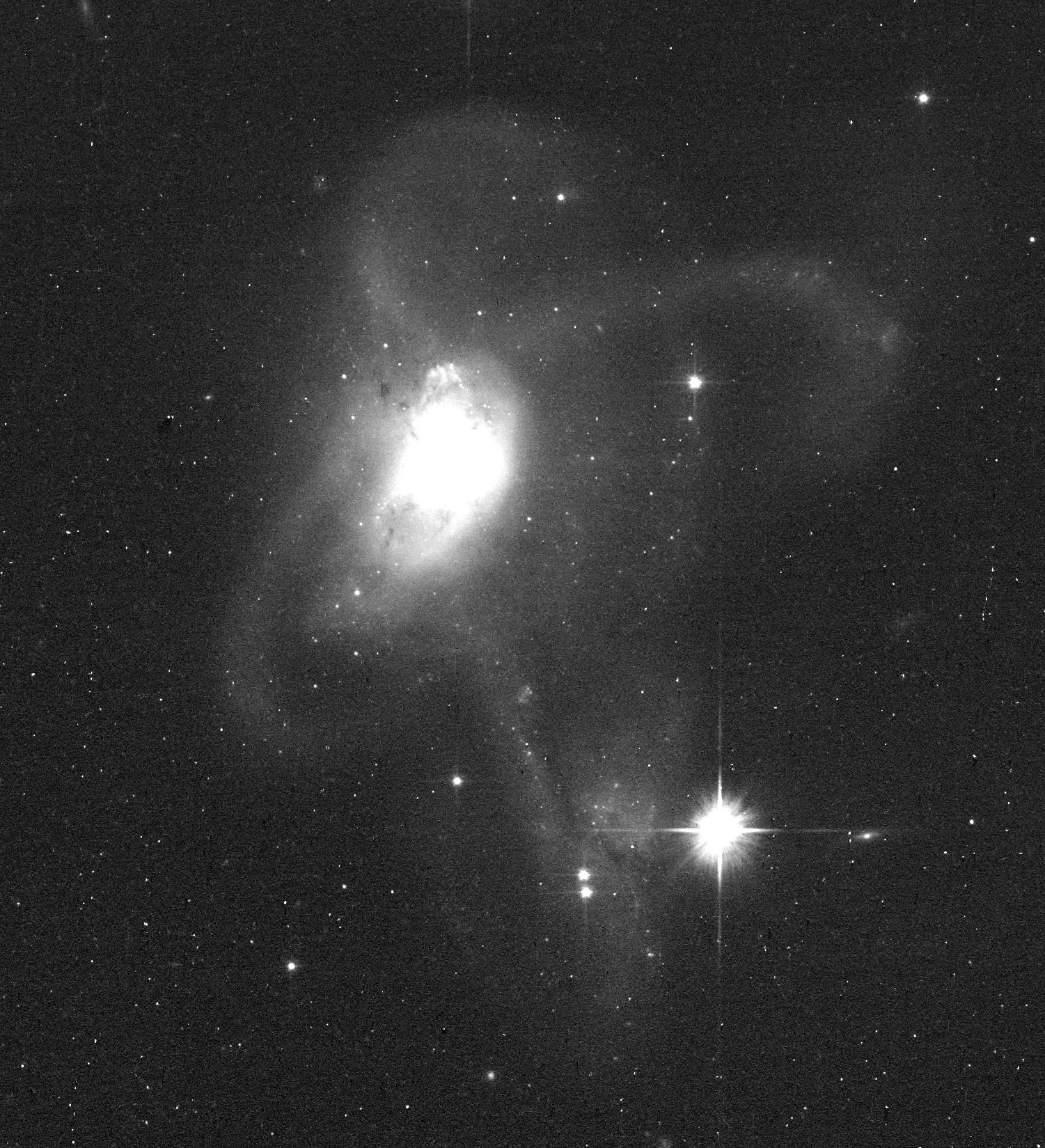
CGCG-396-002

Through public analysis of more than 900,000 objects, volunteers collected a "menagerie of weird and wonderful galaxies" which few had seen before. The original proposal estimated that there were 1100 targets available, yet only 300 observation slots, so the public was asked to vote for which targets should be in the final list. Voting took place in February 2018 in order to meet the proposal's deadline of 28 February.

Project lead Dr. William Keel said in an interview on the University of Alabama site that Zoogems addressed a range of studies and that this happens rarely with galaxies. He explained that after volunteers had sifted through the images of a million galaxies, they had found examples of oddities and rarities. Further, by using data from HST, these objects that would not normally merit an individual project, put together would form an interesting study. Whenever a 20-minute gap in the HST schedule appears, software will go to the list of objects and see which is closest.

== Observation setup ==
As with all HST gap-filler observations, the Wide-Field Camera mode of the Advanced Camera for Surveys is used for its larger field-of-view. The total exposure time of 674 seconds is made by a pair of two 337 second exposures, the same for all the gap-filler observations. Which of the following three filters is used depends on the target: i) the bluer F475W (roughly SDSS g) is used for mostly spiral structures, ii) the F814W for bulges and iii) the F625W which is closely matched with SDSS r filter. A range of software is used to calculate where the target's image is captured on the available ACS CCDs, using a coordinate offset within a 'circle of interest' to find the most useful coverage. A different strategy for Green Pea systems uses a choice of four filters allotted using distance values so as to study the continuum structure.

== Green Pea galaxies ==
Among the 300 Zoogems, there are 74 candidates that are Pea galaxies. The first Zoogems study to be published in May 2021 was "An Old Stellar Population or Diffuse Nebular Continuum Emission Discovered in Green Pea Galaxies" which concentrated on 9 of them. In this study, Leonardo Clarke et al. examine the content of PGs to find out about the different ages of the stars and find that while the central star-forming clusters were up to 500 million years old, there are stars, possibly the host galaxy stars, which are older and are thought to be more than 1 billion years old.

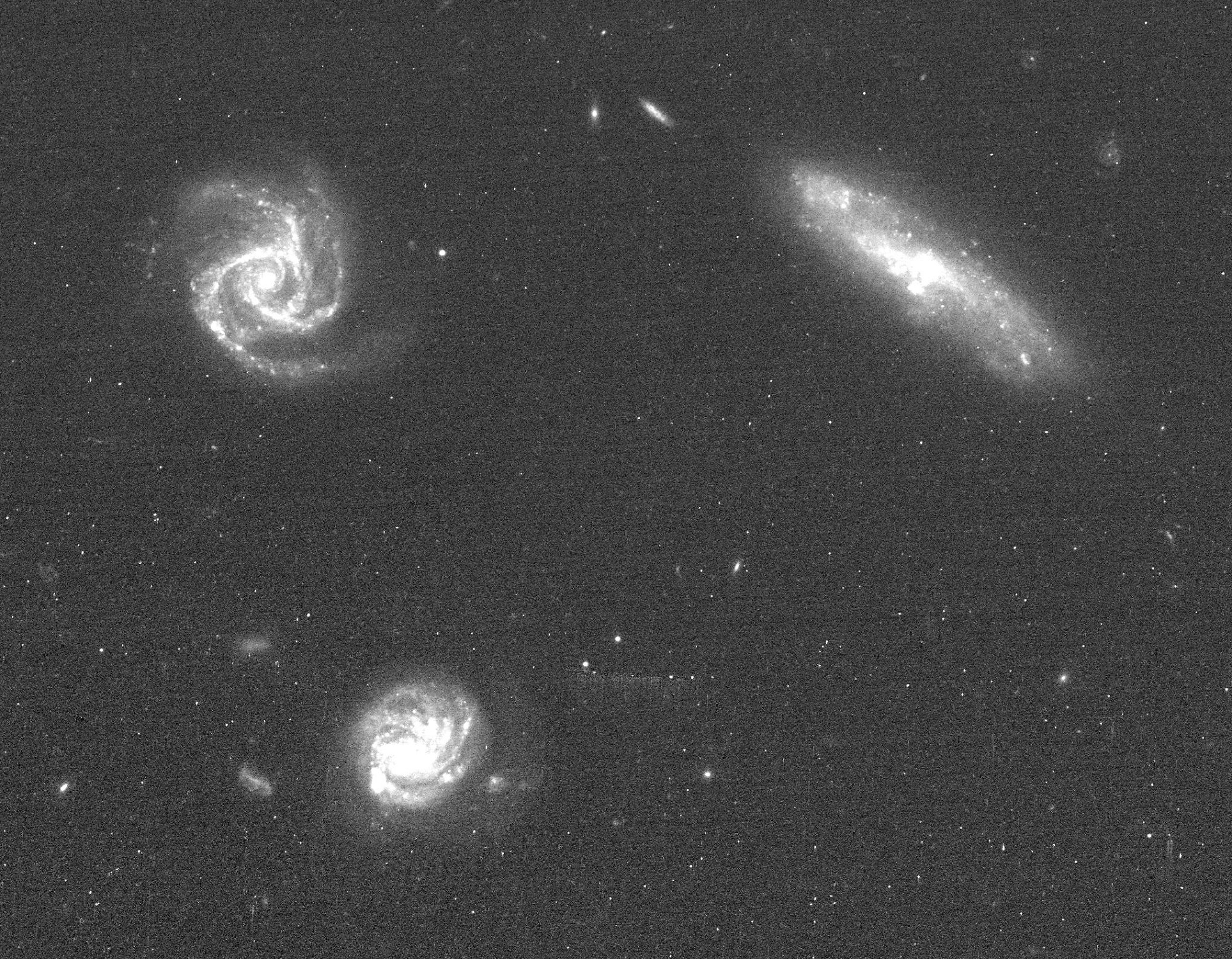
Unusual three-armed galaxy top left.

Pea galaxies have been studied as they are the only population that has hydrogen-ionizing radiation escaping in large amounts. Because of this, they are seen as analogs of the galaxies that reionized the universe at the earliest times. Yet the substantial presence of old stars would not have been possible at the earliest stages of the first galaxies. The mix of old and new stars within Pea galaxies could create different gravitational conditions which might influence galactic winds and element retention. These conclusions imply that Pea galaxies are not real analogues of the galaxies responsible for the Epoch of Reionisation.

== Double-lobed radio-loud AGNs ==
The first study detailing objects from Radio Galaxy Zoo was published by the Astrophysical Journal in December 2022. "An Elusive Population of Massive Disk Galaxies Hosting Double-lobed Radio-loud AGNs" seeks to answer whether the galaxy morphology of radio-loud Active Galactic Nucleii and its hosts are solely ellipticals ("early-type"), or that some are spirals ("late type"). Using images taken as part of Zoogems, they analyse a sample of radio galaxies which have extended double-lobed structures and see whether they can be associated with their disk-like optical objects. They find 18 galaxies that can be identified as spiral that are likely to have genuine associations between the radio and optical counterparts.

Zihao et al. assess whether these are chance alignments or that a host is too faint to be detected using probability statistics. This gave rise to the two confidence divisions of 'high' or 'low' with 18 having a high confidence and 14 a low confidence from the initial 32 galaxies. Because of the high-resolution Zoogems images and the visibility of disk-like structures, the team finds that galaxy morphology can no longer be a unique signpost of a galaxy's ability to generate large-scale radio jets.

== Unearthing galactic gems ==
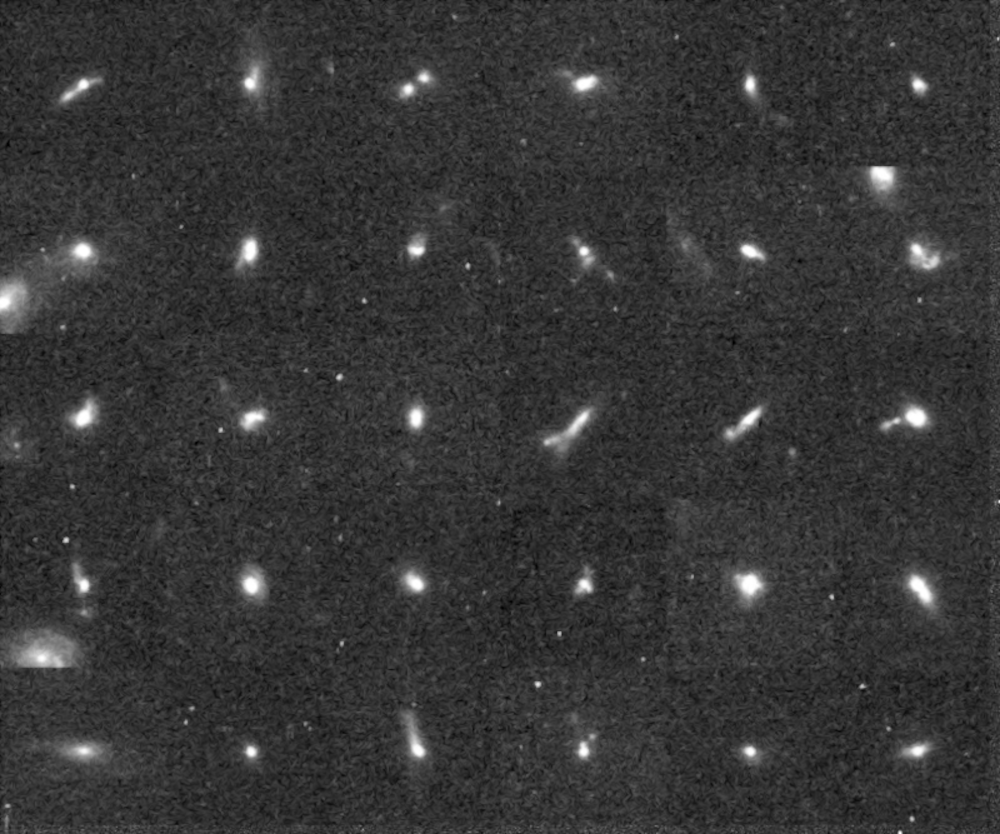
A composite of 30 Green Pea galaxies taken by the HST as part of the Zoogems project.

In October 2023, the magazine Sky and Telescope featured an article entitled "Unearthing galactic gems". In it, the science journalist Madison Goldberg summarises the project and talks to Tom Brown from the Space Telescope Science Institute about the process of gap-fillers. Spare Hubble time had been used before with the 45 minute "snapshot programs" but some unscheduled time remained. Brown said: "It just seemed like a waste to be throwing that time on the floor. Just a handful of minutes here and there, but still, it adds up." And so, the gap-filler project started using those small gaps in the timetable to take 11 minute exposures.

Bill Keel, project lead scientist, explained that unusual galaxies can help us understand the universe today. He described the ZooGems category of 'overlapping galaxy pairs'. He said: "What’s unusual there is not the galaxies themselves, but the fact that one sits neatly behind the other in telescopic images." Samantha Brunker, a scientist studying Green Pea galaxies, said that the variety of unusual targets included in ZooGems is special. "If you’re going to paint a whole picture, you can’t leave out the weird things."

== Various objects ==
NGC 1175, nicknamed the 'Peanut galaxy' is a barred spiral galaxy, approximately 252 million light years away. This has a peculiar morphology with the inner regions being thicker in some than in others, which has caused a 'boxy' appearance reminding the astronomers of an unshelled peanut.

NGC 2292 and NGC 2293 are two ellipticals, nicknamed the 'Greater Pumpkin', that have merged at about 120 million light years away. These interacting galaxies will eventually become a giant spiral, an event rare enough that there are only a few other examples in the Universe.

The VV-689 system, nicknamed the 'Angel Wing', is two galaxies merging. This interaction has left the resulting collision almost completely symmetrical (top of article).

The HST image of CGCG 396-2 shows an uncommon multi-armed merger 520 million light years from earth.

Two spiral galaxies, SDSS J115331 and LEDA 2073461, over a billion light years away, appear to be colliding. The effect caused by line-of-sight is likely by chance as the two are not actually interacting (image right hand side).

== See also ==
- Citizen Science
- Cosmic dust
- Irregular galaxy
- Virtual volunteering
- Zooniverse
