= The Milky Way Project =

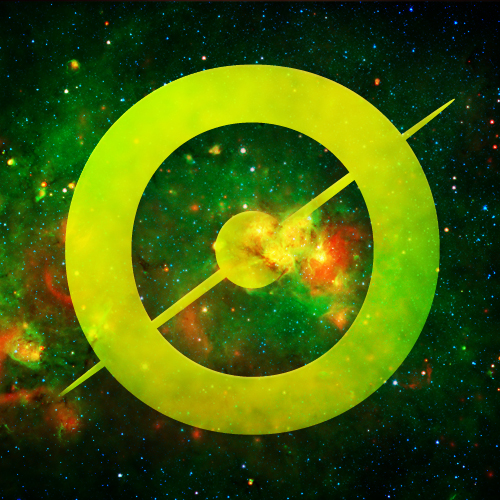
The Milky Way Project logo

The Milky Way Project is a Zooniverse project whose main goal is to identify stellar-wind bubbles in the Milky Way Galaxy. Users classify sets of infrared images from the Spitzer Space Telescope and the Wide-field Infrared Survey Explorer (WISE). Scientists believe bubbles in these images are the result of young, massive stars whose light causes shocks in interstellar gas.

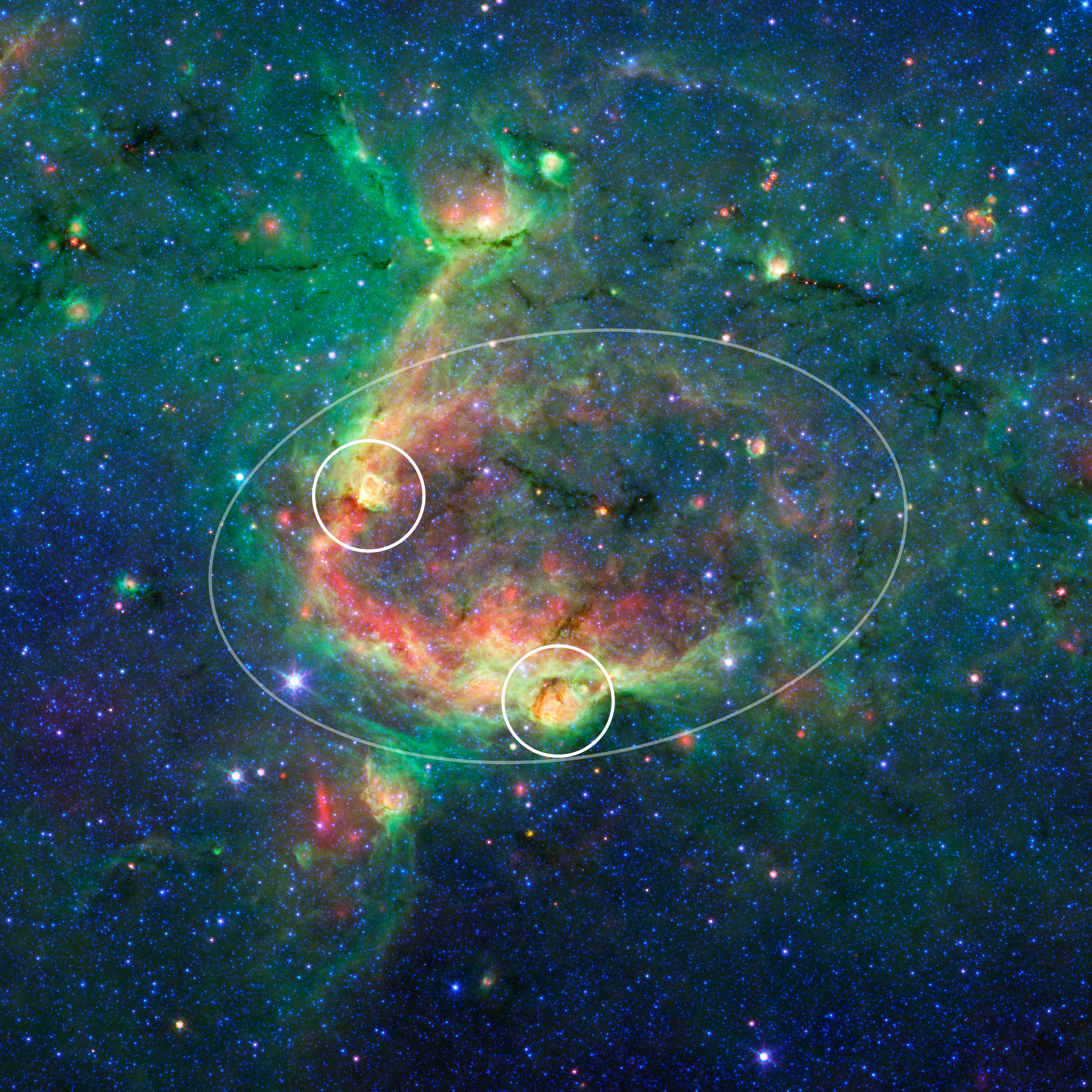
An example of what is called a hierarchical bubble structure, in which one giant bubble, carved into the dust of space by massive stars, has triggered the formation of smaller bubbles

== Details ==
The Milky Way Project works with data taken from the Multiband Imaging Photometer for Spitzer Galactic Plane Survey (MIPSGAL) and Galactic Legacy Infrared Mid-Plane Survey Extraordinaire (GLIMPSE). Only a small part uses WISE data. The project looks for bubbles, which can mean the formation of stars. The project also looks for knots, star clusters, and other objects such as young stars, supernova remnants, and newly discovered galaxies.

== History ==
The Milky Way Project started as the ninth Zooniverse project in December 2010. The phase 1 worked with the colors: 4.5 μm for blue, 8.0 μm for green and 24 μm for red. This resulted in the Data Release 1 (DR1) of the Milky Way Project in 2012 with 5,106 bubbles, which can also be found in SIMBAD.

The annulus tool that was used to mark the bubbles in the Milky Way Project phase 1 was at random round and needed improvement. This problem was solved after the introduction of the ellipse tool. This new tool was used in the phase 2 of the project, short after DR1. This changed the classification and the tool does fit the actual shape of the bubbles. The phase 2 also used different colors: 3.6 μm for blue, 4.5 μm for green and 8.0 μm for red, the same three colors as GLIMPSE 360 in Aladin Lite. Phase 3 is also called Phoenix since it started after a year offline and it is now active. Phase 3 uses the same colors as phase 1 and the same ellipse tool as phase 2, combining the strength of phase 1+2.

The Milky Way Project did also search for star clusters and galaxies. Phase 2 additionally did search for Extended Green Objects (EGO), 4.5 μm emissions that seem to be connected to outflow from massive young stellar objects. The volunteers did mention objects that are compact and yellow in the Milky Way Project. They are now called yellow balls, a mix of compact star-forming regions that show transition into bubbles. In the phase 3 the volunteers can additionally search for yellowballs, pillars and bowshocks. Phase 3 aims to create a reliable bubble catalog (DR2) with the data from phase 2+3 (4.4 million classifications), an improved yellowball catalog and the largest bowshock catalog to date. For this goal the 24 μm part of the image is important: Bubbles are more easy to spot and bowshocks are most of the time visible at this wavelength.

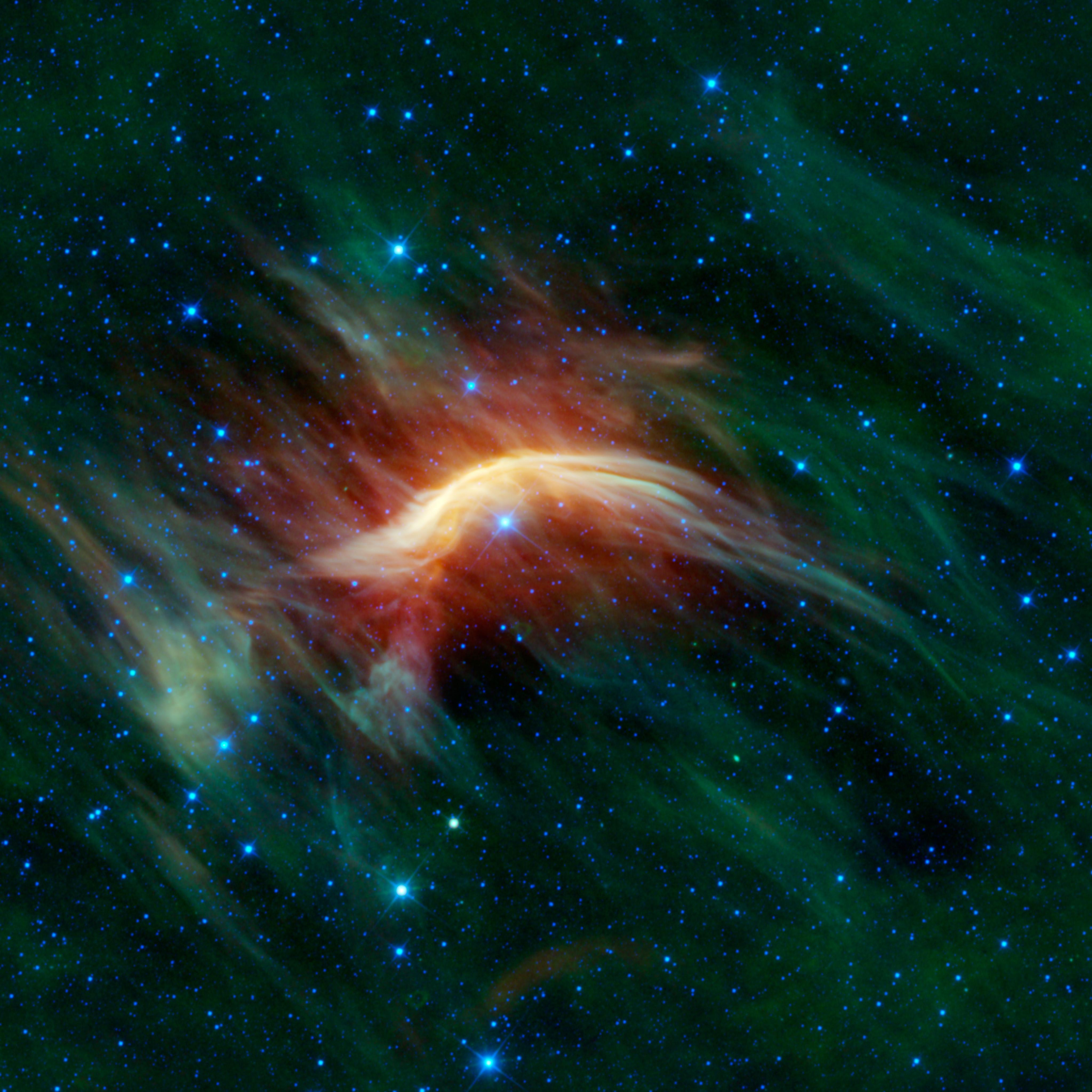
Example of a runaway star forming an infrared bow shock. Here: Zeta Ophiuchi.

The MWP classification aggregation pipeline is continuously tested and modified to avoid issues that were encountered in DR1.

The second Data Release was published in 2019, which contains 2,600 infrared (IR) bubbles and 599 candidate IR bow shock candidates. With a subset of highly reliable subset of 1394 IR bubbles and 453 bow shocks. The lower number of bubbles is being explained with a better quality of the catalog. The new catalog includes bow shocks near the star-forming regions NGC 3603 and RCW 49. The size of the bubbles in the catalog is proven to be as good as expert classifications and to be better than in previous works. The mysterious "coffee ring" is presented as well, but although this perfect ring in absorption was observed with the Green Bank Telescope, the nature of this object remains a mystery.

== See also ==
Zooniverse projects:

- The Daily Minor Planet
- Asteroid Zoo
- Backyard Worlds
- Disk Detective
- Galaxy Zoo
- Old Weather
- Planet Hunters
- SETILive
