= Galaxy Zoo =

Crowdsourced astronomy project

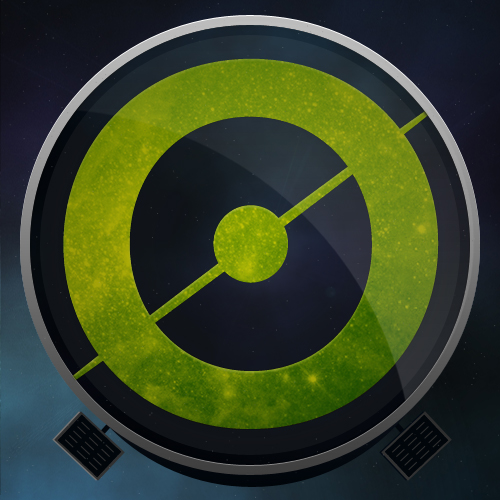
- Website type: Volunteer Scientific Project
- Available in: English, French, Spanish, German, Polish, Czech, Chinese, Japanese
- Owner: The Citizen Science Alliance
- Creator: Galaxy Zoo Team
- Website: www.galaxyzoo.org
- Commercial: No
- Registration: Yes
- Launched: 11 July 2007
- Current status: Ongoing

Galaxy Zoo is a crowdsourced astronomy project which invites people to assist in the morphological classification of large numbers of galaxies. It is an example of citizen science as it enlists the help of members of the public to help in scientific research.

There have been 15 versions as of July 2017. Galaxy Zoo is part of the Zooniverse, a group of citizen science projects. An outcome of the project is to better determine the different aspects of objects and to separate them into classifications.

== Origins ==
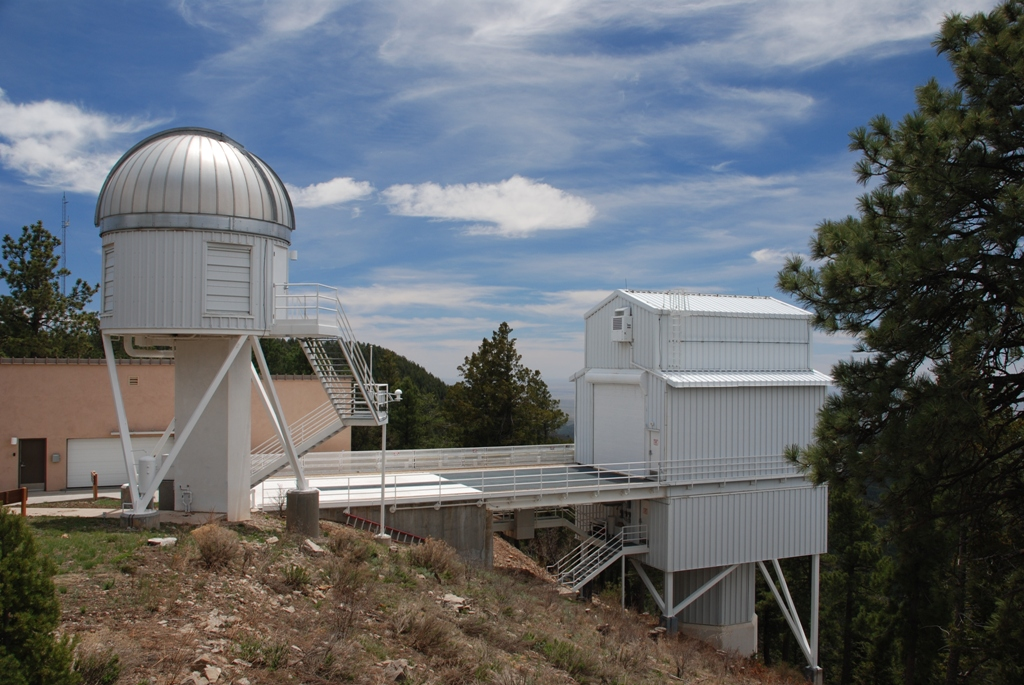
ARCSAT and SDSS telescope buildings at the Apache Point Observatory

A key factor leading to the creation of the project was the problem of what has been referred to as data deluge, where research produces vast sets of information to the extent that research teams are not able to analyse and process much of it. Kevin Schawinski, previously an astrophysicist at Oxford University and co-founder of Galaxy Zoo, described the problem that led to Galaxy Zoo's creation when he was set the task of classifying the morphology of more than 900,000 galaxies by eye that had been imaged by the Sloan Digital Sky Survey at the Apache Point Observatory in New Mexico, USA. "I classified 50,000 galaxies myself in a week, it was mind-numbing." Chris Lintott, a co-founder of the project and a professor of astrophysics at the University of Oxford, stated: "In many parts of science, we're not constrained by what data we can get, we're constrained by what we can do with the data we have. Citizen science is a very powerful way of solving that problem."

The Galaxy Zoo concept was inspired by others such as Stardust@home, where the public was asked by NASA to search images obtained from a mission to a comet for interstellar dust impacts. Unlike earlier internet-based citizen science projects such as SETI@home, which used spare computer processing power to analyse data (also known as distributed or volunteer computing), Stardust@home involved the active participation of human volunteers to complete the research task. In August 2014, the Stardust team reported the discovery of first potential interstellar space particles after citizen scientists had looked through more than a million images.

In 2007, when Galaxy Zoo first started, the science team hoped that 20–30,000 people would take part in classifying the 900,000 galaxies that made up the sample. It had been estimated that a perfect graduate student working 24 hours a day 7 days a week would take 3–5 years to classify all the galaxies in the sample once. However, in the first Galaxy Zoo, more than 40 million classifications were made in approximately 175 days by more than 100,000 volunteers, providing an average of 38 classifications per galaxy.

Chris Lintott commented that: "One advantage is that you get to see parts of space that have never been seen before. These images were taken by a robotic telescope and processed automatically, so the odds are that when you log on, that first galaxy you see will be one that no human has seen before." This was confirmed by Kevin Schawinski: "Most of these galaxies have been photographed by a robotic telescope, and then processed by computer. So this is the first time they will have been seen by human eyes.".

== Volunteers ==
Galaxy Zoo recruited volunteers to help with the largest galaxy census ever carried out. Opening the project to the general public saved the professional astronomers the task of studying all the galaxies themselves, resulting in classification of a large number of galaxies undertaken in a shorter time than what smaller research teams would be able to do, classifying 900,000 galaxies in months rather than years if done by smaller research teams. Computer programs had been unable to reliably classify galaxies: several groups had attempted to develop image-analysis programs. Kevin Schawinski stated: "The human brain is actually much better than a computer at these pattern recognition tasks." However, volunteers astonished the project's organizers by classifying the entire catalog years ahead of schedule. An online forum was later set up two weeks after the initial start, partially due to a large volume of emails being sent around, to the point that it was troublesome for those receiving them to process and respond to them. This led volunteers to point out anomalies that on closer inspection have turned out to be new astronomical objects such as 'Hanny's Voorwerp' and 'the Green Pea galaxies'. "I'm incredibly impressed by what they've managed to achieve," says University of Oxford astronomer Roger Davies, former president of the Royal Astronomical Society."They've made it possible to do things with a huge survey."

The Galaxy Zoo forum became a hotbed for the discussion of the SDSS images and more general science questions. Its 'global moderator', volunteer communuity manager and UK astronomy enthusiast Alice Sheppard, said of it: "I don't quite know what it is, but Galaxy Zoo does something to people. The contributions, both creative and academic, that people have made to the forum are as stunning as the sight of any spiral, and never fail to move me." Author Michael Nielsen wrote in his book Reinventing Discovery: "But Galaxy Zoo can go beyond computers, because it can also apply human intelligence in the analysis, the kind of intelligence that recognizes that Hanny's Voorwerp or a Pea galaxy is out of the ordinary, and deserves further investigation. Galaxy Zoo is thus a hybrid, able to do deep analyses of large data sets that are impossible in any other way." A community feeling was also created. Roger Davies stated: "The community of Galaxy Zoo gives them the opportunity to participate that they're looking for." This community became known as the 'Zooites'. Aida Berges, a homemaker living in Puerto Rico who has classified hundreds of thousands of galaxies, stated: "Every galaxy has a story to tell. They are beautiful, mysterious, and show how amazing our universe is. It was love at first sight when I started in Galaxy Zoo ... It is a magical place, and it feels like coming home at last." The Galaxy Zoo Forum became a read-only archive in July 2014. After seven years online and over 650,000 posts, it continues to generate science.

As of July 2017, 60 scientific papers have been published as a direct result of Galaxy Zoo and hundreds of thousands of volunteers. In previous studies though, it was found that data produced by volunteers was more likely to contain bias or mistakes. However Chris Lintott says that crowdsourced results are reliable, as proven by the fact that they are being used and published in peer-reviewed science papers. Indeed, other scientists have questioned crowdsourcing and crowdsourced studies. Steven Bamford, a Galaxy Zoo research scientist, stated: "As a professional researcher you take pride in the work that you do. And the idea that anybody off the street could come and do something better sounds threatening but also implausible." David Anderson, the founder of BOINC, stated: [For many sceptical scientists] "There's this idea that they're giving up control somehow, and that their importance would be diminished". The continuing goodwill of citizen scientists is also questioned. Chris Lintott stated: "Rather than letting anyone pitch for volunteers, we'd like to be a place where people can come and expect a certain level of commitment".

A conference was held between 10–12 July 2017 at St. Catherine's College, Oxford, to recognise the tenth anniversary of the start of Galaxy Zoo in July 2007. Co-founder Chris Lintott stated: "What started as a small project has been completely transformed by the enthusiasm and efforts of the volunteers... It has had a real impact on our understanding of galaxy evolution." 125 million galaxy classifications resulting in 60 peer reviewed academic papers from at least 15 different projects have been made since July 2007. Discoveries include: Hanny's Voorwerp, Green pea galaxies and more recently objects known as 'Yellow Balls'. On the conference Twitter feed, #GZ10, it states that 10 of the 60 papers have over 100 citations [within the Astrophysics Data System] in 10 years. Karen Masters, an astrophysicist at Portsmouth University and project scientist for GZ stated: "We're genuinely asking for help with something we cannot do ourselves and the results have made a big contribution to the field." As a result of GZ's success, the citizen science web portal Zooniverse was started, which has since hosted a 100 projects.

== Retired projects ==
=== Galaxy Zoo 1 ===
The original Galaxy Zoo consisted of 100,000 galaxies imaged by the Sloan Digital Sky Survey. With so many galaxies, it had been assumed that it would take years for visitors to the site to work through them all, but within 24 hours of launch, the website was receiving almost 70,000 classifications an hour. In the end, more than 50 million classifications were received by the project during its first year, contributed by more than 150,000 people. This was started in July 2007 and retired in 2009.

=== Galaxy Zoo 2 ===
This consisted of some 250,000 of the brightest galaxies from the Sloan Digital Sky Survey. Galaxy Zoo 2 allowed for a much more detailed classification, by shape and by the intensity or dimness of the galactic core, and with a special section for oddities like mergers or ring galaxies. The sample also contained fewer optical oddities. The project which collected classifications from February 2009 – April 2010 and closed with some 60 million classifications.

=== Galaxy Zoo mergers ===
This studied the role of interacting galaxies. Interacting galaxies are galaxies that exhibit a gravitational influence on one another. This influence is exhibited over the course of millions or even billions of years as two or more galaxies pass nearby one another. The near passage of two massive structures can cause the galaxies to be distorted and possibly merge. The Galaxy Zoo Mergers aimed to provide a set of tools that allowed users to randomly sample various sets of simulation parameters in rapid succession by showing 8 simulation outputs at a time. This started in November 2009 and was retired in June 2012.

=== Galaxy Zoo supernovae ===
Galaxy Zoo used images partner from the Palomar Transient Factory to find Supernovae. The task in this Galaxy Zoo project was to help catch exploding stars – supernovae. Data for the site was provided by an automatic survey in California at the Palomar Observatory. Astronomers followed up on the best candidates at telescopes around the world. This started in August 2009 and was retired in August 2012.

=== Galaxy Zoo Hubble ===
The site's third incarnation, Galaxy Zoo Hubble, drew from surveys conducted by the Hubble Space Telescope to view earlier epochs of galaxy formation. In these surveys, which involve many days of dedicated observing time, we can see light from galaxies which has taken billions of years to reach us. The idea behind Galaxy Zoo Hubble was to be able to compare galaxies then to galaxies now, giving us a clear understanding of what factors influence their growth, whether through mergers, active black holes or simply star formation. This started in April 2010 and was retired in September 2012.

In October 2016, a study titled: "Galaxy Zoo: Morphological Classifications for 120,000 Galaxies in HST Legacy Imaging" was accepted for publication by the journal Monthly Notices of the Royal Astronomical Society. The abstract begins: "We present the data release paper for the Galaxy Zoo: Hubble project. This is the third phase in a large effort to measure reliable, detailed morphologies of galaxies by using crowdsourced visual classifications of colour composite images. Images in Galaxy Zoo Hubble were selected from various publicly-released Hubble Space Telescope Legacy programs conducted with the Advanced Camera for Surveys, with filters that probe the rest- frame optical emission from galaxies out to z ≈1."

=== Galaxy Zoo 4 ===
Galaxy Zoo 4 combined new imaging from the Sloan Digital Sky Survey with the most distant images yet from the Hubble Space Telescope CANDELS survey. The CANDELS survey makes use of the new Wide Field Camera 3 to take ultra-deep images of the universe. The project also includes images taken with the United Kingdom Infrared Telescope in Hawaii, for the recently completed UKIDSS project. UKIDSS is the largest, deepest survey of the sky at infrared wavelengths. Kevin Schawinski explained that: "The two sources of data work together perfectly: the new images from Sloan give us our most detailed view of the local universe, while the CANDELS survey from the Hubble telescope allows us to look deeper into the universe's past than ever before."

In October 2016, a paper was accepted for publishing in MNRAS titled: "Galaxy Zoo: Quantitative Visual Morphological Classifications for 48,000 galaxies from CANDELS". Quoting: "We present quantified visual morphologies of approximately 48,000 galaxies observed in three Hubble Space Telescope legacy fields by the Cosmic And Near-infrared Deep Extragalactic Legacy Survey (CANDELS) and classified by participants in the Galaxy Zoo project. 90% of galaxies have z < 3 and are observed in rest-frame optical wavelengths by CANDELS. Each galaxy received an average of 40 independent classifications, which we combine into detailed morphological information on galaxy features such as clumpiness, bar instabilities, spiral structure, and merger and tidal signatures."

=== Radio Galaxy Zoo ===
On 17 December 2013, Galaxy Zoo opened a project called Radio Galaxy Zoo. It uses observations from the Australia Telescope Large Area Survey in Radio, and compares them to the Spitzer Space Telescope's infrared data. There are about 6000 images to look through. The CSIRO press release states that Radio Galaxy Zoo is a new citizen science project that lets anyone become a cosmic explorer. It continues that by matching galaxy images with radio images from CSIRO's Australia Telescope, a participant can work out if a galaxy has a supermassive black hole.

=== Other projects ===
Another project that uses data from volunteer classifications is Galaxy Zoo Quench, which studies the interactions between galaxies and the effect it has on starbursts (among others).

== Active projects ==
=== Galaxy Zoo James Webb Space Telescope ===
The current incarnation of Galaxy Zoo uses volunteers to classify hundreds of thousands of images taken by James Webb Space Telescope's COSMOS-Web survey, which is a large extragalactic survey imaging galaxies in the COSMOS field at extremely early cosmic times. An earlier iteration of Galaxy Zoo using data from JWST's Cosmic Evolution Early Research (CEERS) survey was used as a pilot for this project, and helped to establish the existence of stable disc galaxies at redshift 7.4, or just 700 million years after the Big Bang.

=== Complete list of projects ===
As of March 2026, the full list of Galaxy Zoo projects is: Galaxy Zoo 1, Galaxy Zoo 2, Galaxy Zoo Mergers, Galaxy Zoo Supernovae, Galaxy Zoo Hubble, Galaxy Zoo CANDELS, Radio Galaxy Zoo, Galaxy Zoo Quench, Galaxy Zoo DECALS 1, Galaxy Zoo DECALS2 + SDSS, Illustris, UKIDSS, Galaxy Zoo Bar Lengths, FERENGI, GAMA, Cosmic Dawn, Euclid, CEERS, and JWST.

=== Related ===
In June 2019, citizen scientists through Galaxy Zoo reported that the usual Hubble classification, particularly concerning spiral galaxies, may not be supported, and may need updating.

== Rotation of galaxies ==
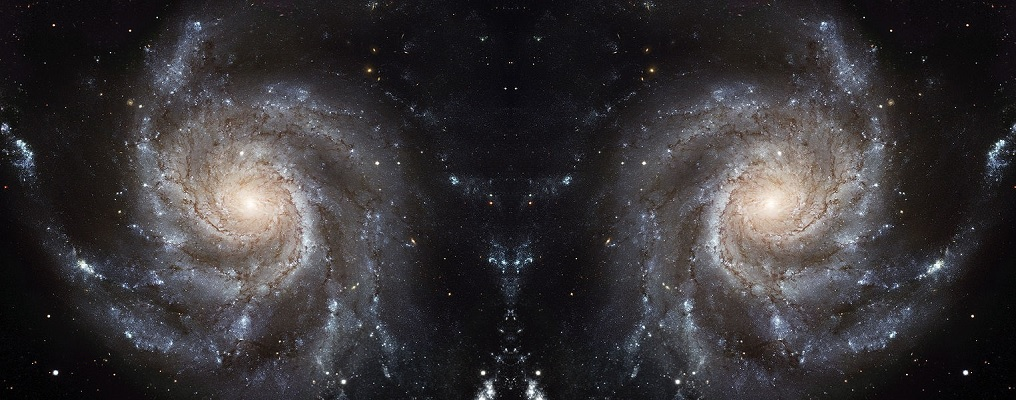
CW or ACW? This HST image of Messier 101, the Pinwheel Galaxy in its normal S-wise orientation and then reversed.

One of the original aims for Galaxy Zoo was to explore which way galaxies rotated. Cosmologist Kate Land stated: "Some people have argued that galaxies are rotating all in agreement with each other, not randomly as we'd expect. We want people to classify the galaxies according to which way they're rotating and I'll be able to go and see if there's anything bizarre going on. If there are any patterns that we're not expecting, it could really turn up some surprises." In Galaxy Zoo 1, volunteers were asked to judge from the SDSS images whether the galaxies were elliptical or spiral and, if spiral, whether they were rotating in a clockwise (Z-wise) or anti-clockwise (S-wise) direction. The rotation, also called the chirality, of galaxies has been examined in several Galaxy Zoo related papers.

Among the results a psychological bias was demonstrated. Galaxy Zoo scientists wanted to determine whether spiral galaxies were evenly distributed, or whether an intrinsic property of the universe caused them to rotate one way or the other. When the Science team came to analyse the results, they found an excess of anticlockwise-spinning spiral galaxies. But when the team asked volunteers to classify the same images which had then been reversed, there was still an excess of anticlockwise classifications, delegating that the human brain has real difficulty discerning between something rotating clockwise or anticlockwise. Having measured this effect, the team could adjust for it, and established that spirals near each other tended to rotate in the same direction.

== Blue ellipticals and red spirals ==
Mainstream astronomical theory before Galaxy Zoo held that elliptical (or 'early type') galaxies were red in color and spiral (or 'late type') galaxies were blue in color: several papers published as a result of Galaxy Zoo have proved otherwise. A population of blue ellipticals was found. These are galaxies which have changed their shape from spiral to oval, but still have young stars in them. Indeed, Galaxy Zoo came about through Schawinski's searching for blue elliptical galaxies, as near the end of 2006, he had spent most of his waking hours trying to find these rare galaxies. Blueness in galaxies means that new stars are forming. However ellipticals are almost always red, indicating that they are full of old and dead stars. Thus, blue ellipticals are paradoxical, but give clues to star-formation in different types of galaxies.

Also, a population of red spirals was found. These have a different evolutionary path from normal spiral galaxies, showing red spiral galaxies can stop making new stars without changing their shape. Using Galaxy Zoo data for their sample, Tojeiro et al. 2013 found (pg.5): 13,959 red ellipticals, 381 blue ellipticals, 5,139 blue late-type spirals, 294 red late-type spirals, 1,144 blue early-type spirals, and 1,265 red early-type spirals. Chris Lintott stated: "These red spiral galaxies had been lurking in the data and no-one had spotted them. They were staring us in the face. Now we know that a third of spirals around the edges of some clusters of galaxies are red." He also stated: "These results are possible thanks to a major scientific contribution from our many volunteer armchair astronomers. No group of professionals could have classified this many galaxies alone." A team using the Hubble Space Telescope has independently verified the existence of red spirals. Meghan Gray stated: "Our two projects have approached the problem from very different directions. It is gratifying to see that we each provide independent pieces of the puzzle pointing to the same conclusion."

It is thought that Red Spirals are galaxies in the process of transition from young to old. They are more massive than blue spirals and are found on the outskirts of large clusters of galaxies. Chris Lintott stated: "We think what we're seeing is galaxies that have been gently strangled, so to speak, where somehow the gas supply for star formation has been cut off, but that they've been strangled so gently that the arms are still there." The cause might be the Red Spiral's gentle interaction with a galaxy cluster. He further explained: "The kind of thing we're imagining [is that] as the galaxy moves into a denser environment, there's lot of gas in clusters as well as galaxies, and it's possible the gas from the galaxy just gets stripped off by the denser medium it's plowing into."

== Dust in galaxies ==
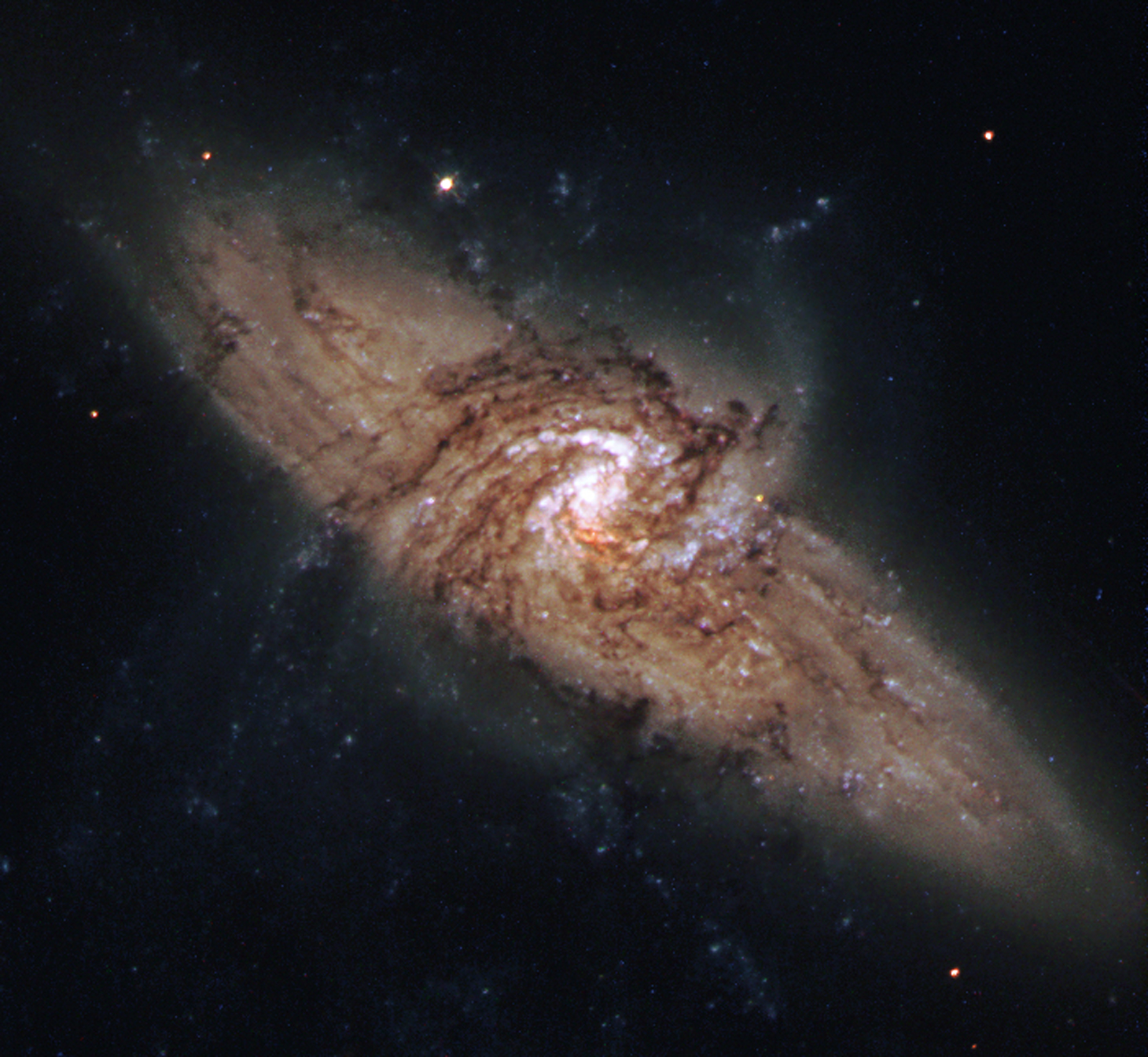
HST image of NGC 3314, an example of an overlapping galaxy.

The properties of Galactic Dust have been examined in several Galaxy Zoo papers. The interstellar medium of spiral galaxies is filled by gas and small solid particles called dust grains. Despite constituting only a minor fraction of the galactic mass (between 0.1% and 0.01% for the Milky Way), dust grains have a major role in shaping the appearance of a galaxy. Because of their dimension (typically smaller than a few tenths of a micron), they are very effective in absorbing and scattering the radiation emitted by stars in the ultraviolet, optical and near-infrared. Although the interstellar regions are more devoid of matter than any vacuum artificially created on earth, there is matter in space. These regions have very low densities and consist mainly of gas (99%) and dust. In total, approximately 15% of the visible matter in the Milky Way is composed of interstellar gas and dust.

The study of dust in galaxies is interesting for many reasons. For example, the dimming effects of dust need to be corrected for to estimate the total mass of a galaxy from measurements of its light. Standard candles used to measure the expansion history of the Universe also need to be corrected for dust extinction.

A catalogue of 1,990 overlapping galaxies was published in 2013, which had been collected by volunteers on the Galaxy Zoo forum using SDSS images. The abstract states: 'Analysis of galaxies with overlapping images offers a direct way to probe the distribution of dust extinction and its effects on the background light.' This catalogue was also used in a study of ultraviolet attenuation laws.

== Galactic bars and bulges ==
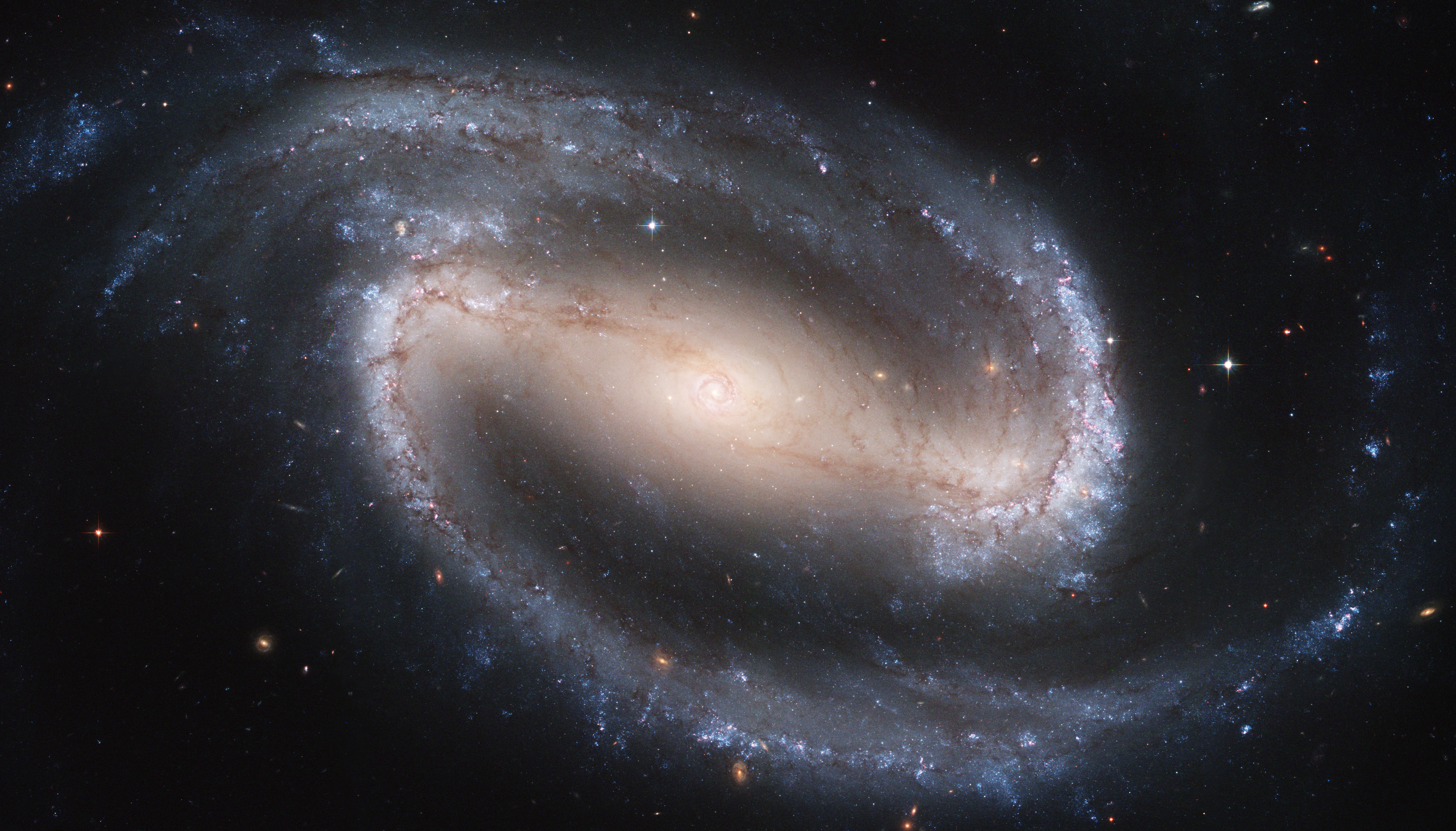
A HST image of NGC 1300, a typical barred spiral

Some spiral galaxies have central bar-shaped structures composed of stars. These galaxies are called 'barred spirals' and have been investigated by Galaxy Zoo in several studies. It is unclear why some spiral galaxies have bars and some do not. Galaxy Zoo research has shown that red spirals are about twice as likely to host bars as blue spirals. These colours are significant. Blue galaxies get their hue from the hot young stars they contain, implying that they are forming stars in large numbers. In red galaxies, this star formation has stopped, leaving behind the cooler, long-lived stars that give them their red colour.

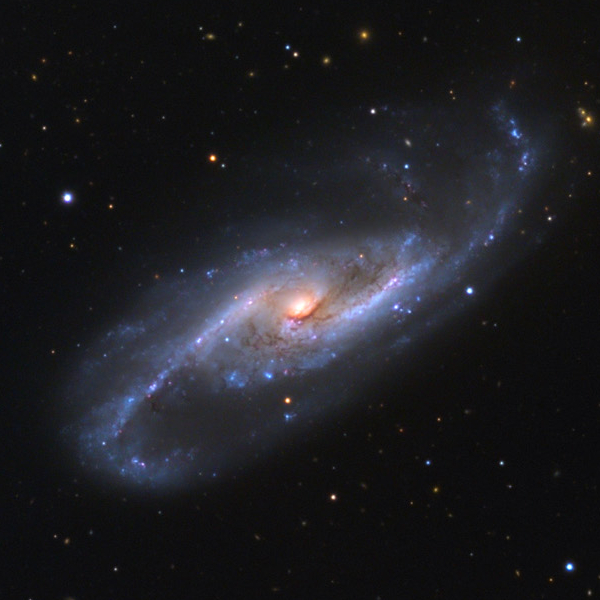
A MLO image of bulgeless galaxy NGC 4536.

Karen Masters, a scientist involved in the studies, stated: "For some time data have hinted that spirals with more old stars are more likely to have bars, but with such a large number of bar classifications we're much more confident about our results. It's not yet clear whether the bars are some side effect of an external process that turns spiral galaxies red, or if they alone can cause this transformation."

Spiral galaxies usually have 'bulges' at their centers. These bulges are huge, tightly packed groups of stars. However, using Galaxy Zoo volunteer classifications, it has been found that some spiral galaxies do not have bulges. Many galactic bulges are thought to host a supermassive black hole at their centers: however pure disk galaxies with no bulges but with growing central black holes were found. That pure disk galaxies and their central black holes may be consistent with a relation derived from elliptical and bulge-dominated galaxies with very different formation histories implies the details of stellar galaxy evolution and dynamics may not be fundamental to the co-evolution of galaxies and black holes. It seems that these bulgeless galaxies have formed in environments isolated from other galaxies. It is hypothesised that the black hole mass may be more tightly tied to the overall gravitational potential of a galaxy and therefore its dark matter halo, rather than to the dynamical bulge component.

In September 2014, a paper titled: "Galaxy Zoo: CANDELS Barred Disks and Bar Fractions" was accepted for publication by the MNRAS. This was the first set of results from the Hubble Space Telescope CANDELS survey that was part of Galaxy Zoo 4. The study reports "the discovery of strong barred structures in massive disk galaxies at z ≈1.5 in deep rest-frame optical images from CANDELS". From within a sample of 876 disk galaxies identified by visual classification in Galaxy Zoo 4, 123 barred galaxies are examined. It is found that the bar fraction across the redshift range 0.5 < z < 2 does not significantly evolve.

== Galaxy mergers and interactions ==
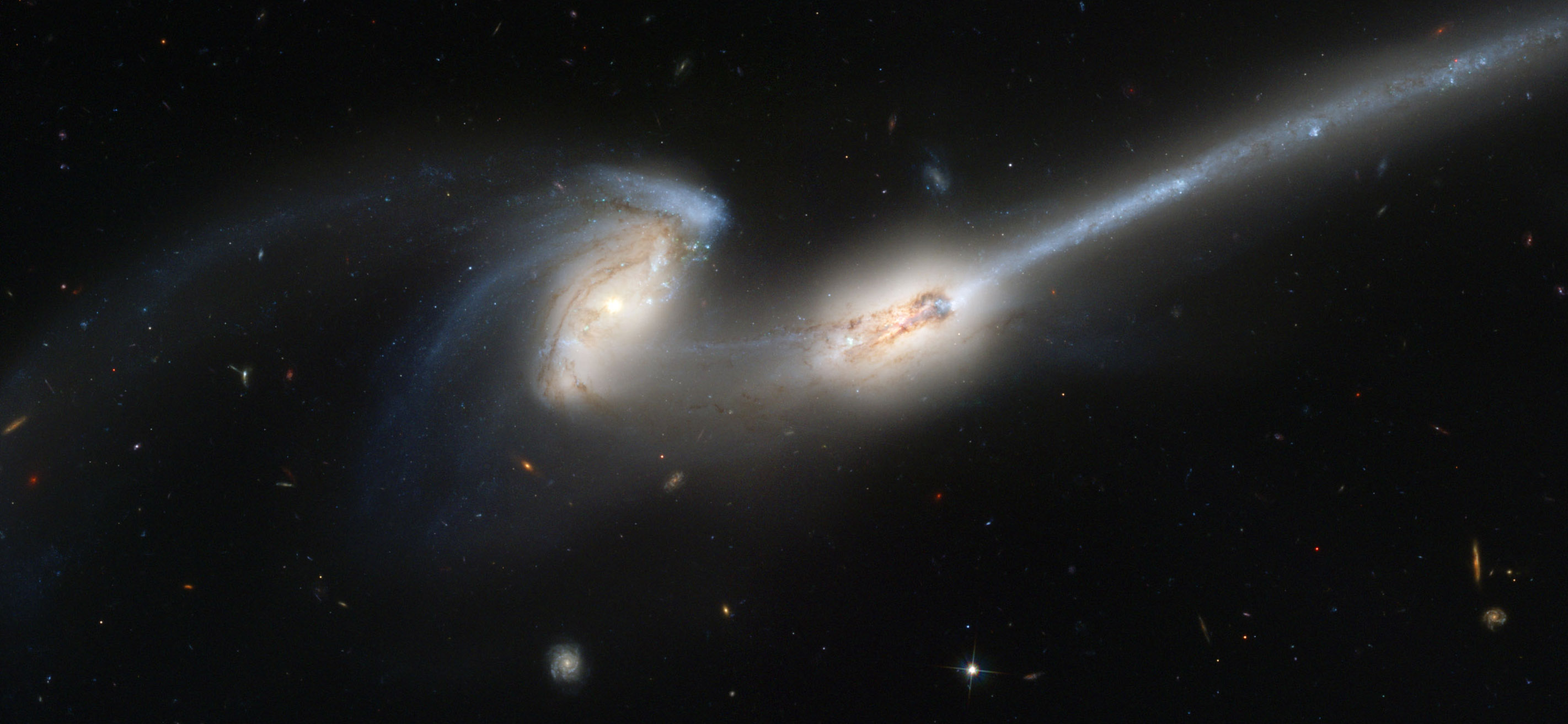
A HST image of the 'Mice Galaxies' which are in the process of merging.

(See also under Retired projects above.)
Galaxy Zoo Mergers was a Galaxy Zoo project started in November 2009 and retired in June 2012. There have also been a number of studies on galaxy mergers, among which was a survey of ≈3000, which presented "the largest, most homogeneous catalogue of merging galaxies in the nearby universe". This catalogue was spread over two papers and was a result of volunteers selecting likely candidates from Galaxy Zoo 1 and posting them on the Galaxy Zoo forum. Other papers that have used Galaxy Zoo data resulted in observations that include those taken by the Chandra X-ray Observatory.

== Literature ==
- Lintott, Chris: The Crowd and the Cosmos: Adventures in the Zooniverse. Oxford University Press 2020. ISBN 978-0-19-884222-4

== See also ==
- Amateur astronomy – Hobby of watching the sky and stars
- Blueberry galaxy - Small and very active galaxies.
- Gems of the Galaxy Zoos – Astronomy project
- List of astronomy websites
- List of citizen science projects
- Participatory monitoring – Collection of measurements undertaken by citizens
- Wisdom of the crowd – Collective perception of a group of people
- Virtual volunteering – Online volunteering

Zooniverse projects:

- The Daily Minor Planet - The Catalina Sky Survey's NASA-funded citizen science project
- Asteroid Zoo – Citizen science project
- Backyard Worlds – NASA-funded citizen science project
- Disk Detective – NASA-citizen science project
- Old Weather – Citizen science project transcribing historical weather observations recorded at sea
- Planet Hunters – Citizen science project to find exoplanets
- SETILive
- The Milky Way Project
