= Old Weather =

Citizen science project transcribing historical weather observations recorded at sea

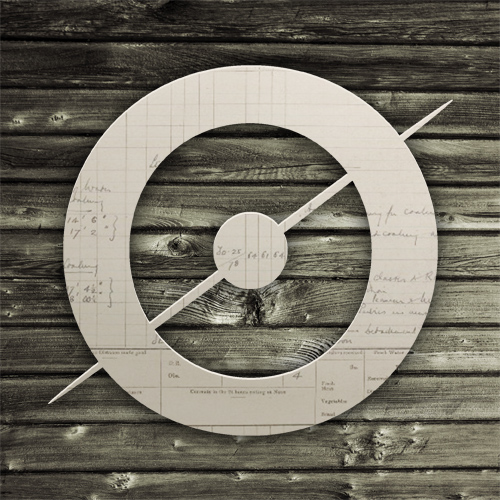
- Website type: Volunteer Scientific Project
- Available in: English
- Owner: Zooniverse
- Creator: Zooniverse
- Website: www.oldweather.org
- Commercial: No
- Registration: Yes
- Launched: 12 October 2010
- Current status: active

Old Weather is an online weather data project that currently invites members of the public to assist in digitising weather observations recorded in ship log books dating from the mid-19th century onwards. It is an example of citizen science that enlists members of the public to help in scientific research. It contributes to the Atmospheric Circulation Reconstructions over the Earth initiative. Data collected by Old Weather has been used by at least five different climate reanalysis projects, including HURDAT, SODA and ECMWF. In February 2013, the project was awarded the Royal Meteorological Society IBM Award for Meteorological Innovation that Matters.

== Origins ==
Old Weather is a Zooniverse project and is a collaboration between researchers at many institutions, including the University of Oxford, Oxford Martin School, ACRE (International Atmospheric Circulation Reconstructions over the Earth), Naval-History.Net of Penarth, Jisc which encourages UK colleges and universities in the innovative use of digital technologies, the National Maritime Museum at Maritime Greenwich, London, and the UK National Archives, Kew, London.

== Importance of volunteers ==
In the past, computer programs have proved unable to read handwriting reliably and the task is much better performed by humans and the results transferred to a digital form.

In the site's tutorial, would-be volunteers are shown how to digitise a weather record. Further instructions on how to transcribe the logs are available on the associated Old Weather forum. It is intended that the pages of the logs are digitised by at least three people. The results will be used to make climate model projections and an improved database of weather extremes.

The Old Weather project is still ongoing and new volunteers are still needed and welcomed.

== USRC, USCG and USS log books ==
Currently, the log books of two US vessels are available, each of which have been scanned page by page, and the logs of another 21 vessels have been completed. More log books will be added at intervals. The transcriber notes the following from the log books: date, location (or voyage) and weather records, usually consisting of wind direction and strength, weather conditions, cloud type and/or amount of clear sky, barometric pressure and temperature readings. Other log entries, such as refueling figures and sightings of sea-ice, ships, people, landmarks or animals may also be recorded, as well as interesting events.

== Progress ==
=== Phases I & II ===
Phase I was launched in October 2010 and all the available Royal Navy logs from that phase and from Phase II have now been completed. By July 23, 2012, officially, 16,400 volunteers had transcribed the weather data from 1,090,745 pages of the log books of 302 ships. These phases of the project have generated 1.6 million weather observations.

=== Phase III ===
Phase III, consisting of logs from US ships voyaging in the Arctic and worldwide from the mid-1800s onward, was launched in October 2012. Phase III was completed 6 August 2018.

=== Old Weather WWII ===
This project was to collect data from the ship logs from 19 US Navy ships in World War II. The project was completed in 2019.

=== US Federal ships ===
Currently, the scope of the project is being extended to include all the oceans including Arctic voyages and expeditions. Satellite imagery of this region goes back only to the 1950s, but it was explored for 100 years before that (for example the Franklin Expedition). When Phase III ended, a new method was required for data input. The volunteer transcribers developed their own method using LibreCalc spreadsheets with the log pages imported as a background. This method better suited the needs of the transcribers. The data from the log pages are transcribed in the spreadsheet and the results for each log page are saved in an XML file. These files are uploaded to a Google drive for processing. This method for data extraction was approved by the science team consisting of Philip Brohan, Kevin Wood and Gil Compo. The results were found to be so accurate, that only one transcription is required for each log page. This portion of the Old Weather project is still ongoing with and emphasis of years between 1860 and 1890. To learn how to participate in this project, visit the Old Weather forum.

=== Whaling Logs ===
This project focuses on the logbooks of whaling ships that sailed Arctic seas from 1849 to 1912. Volunteer transcribers create spreadsheets of information on sea ice and weather provided in the logbooks for scientists to use in climate studies. The logbooks are handwritten and non-standardized so volunteers are encouraged to work communally on transcription work.

Following the death of project founder Kevin Wood, the Whaling Logs section is currently seeking a new institution or platform to accept any future data. The project is not accepting new volunteers until the data has a new home.

Naval History

Old Weather volunteers are transcribing historical data from the ships' logs from US Navy, Revenue Cutter Service/Coast Guard and Coast & Geodetic Survey ships operating mostly in the Arctic and in the Pacific Ocean in the 19th and 20th Centuries.The historical transcriptions are published here, before and after they are edited by Naval-History volunteers. For more details, or to find out how to join in, visit the Old Weather Forum.

== Results ==
Initial results of Phase I will be published after data collection is complete and conclusions can be made.

Indeed, the readings are still being assessed at a very broad level. But the distribution of temperature by latitude and wind force by latitude have been plotted for 120,000 results for which three readings have been taken.

Large numbers of online volunteers at Old Weather from 2010 to 2012 transcribed historical weather data and naval events from the logbooks of the 314 Royal Navy ships of the World War 1 era. 350,000 pages were transcribed and include logs from ships present at the Battle of the Falklands, at Gallipoli, Mesopotamia, East Africa, and the China Station. Nearly all of the transcriptions have been edited and published. Brief details of all the ships can be found here.

The Old Weather U. S. Federal Ships project is still ongoing. As of the end of 2023, 248 ship/years had been processed, with over 7.6 million weather observations digitized. Data from up to 20 different weather elements have been recorded. Data from the project was analyzed by NOAA to reconstruct what had long been described as a hurricane that hit Sitka in Alaska in 1880. The reanalysis showed that it wasn’t a hurricane, but part of a much larger storm system known as an extra-tropical cyclone.

== Security and political considerations ==
Because climate change is a very political issue, interested parties could try to corrupt the data by, say, entering temperature figures that are too high or too low. Because three sets of records for each data point will be entered, any set from a digitiser showing a marked deviation from the other records should be easily checkable and eliminated. Large-scale fraud is unlikely because the data is entered one log page at a time, and so is immune to a spam type of attack. Collaborative projects such as Linux and Wikipedia have for the most part been able to rely on the transparent honesty of those taking part.

== Accidental errors ==
Accidental errors, such as reading '4's for '7's are possible, but often context will sort this out. A temperature of 40 °F is unlikely to be correct for a latitude in the tropics and may safely be assumed to be 70 °F.

== See also ==
Zooniverse projects:

- Asteroid Zoo
- Backyard Worlds
- Disk Detective
- Galaxy Zoo
- Planet Hunters
- SETILive
- The Milky Way Project
