= Reinventing Discovery =

Book on the benefits of applying the philosophy of open science to research

Reinventing Discovery: The New Era of Networked Science
- Author: Michael Nielsen
- Subject: Open science
- Publisher: Princeton University Press
- Publication date: 2011
- Publication place: United States
- Pages: 280
- ISBN: 978-0-691-14890-8

Reinventing Discovery: The New Era of Networked Science is a book written by Michael Nielsen and released in October 2011. It argues for the benefits of applying the philosophy of open science to research.

== Summary ==
The following is a list of major topics in the book's chapters.

1. Reinventing Discovery
2. Online Tools Make Us Smarter
  Kasparov versus the World, The Wisdom of Crowds, various online collaborative projects
3. Restructuring Expert Attention
  InnoCentive, collective intelligence, Paul Seabright's economic theory, online chat
4. Patterns of Online Collaboration
  History of Linux, Open Architecture Network, Wikipedia, MathWorks' computer programming contest
5. The Limits and the Potential of Collective Intelligence
  communication in small groups, particularly as studied by Stasser and Titus; praxis of science; a discussion of communication among scientists
6. All the World's Knowledge
  Don R. Swanson and Literature-based discovery, predicting influenza with Google searches, Sloan Digital Sky Survey, Allen Institute for Brain Science, Ocean Observatories Initiative, Human Genome Project, Google Translate, playchess.com Tournaments
7. Democratizing Science
  Galaxy Zoo, Foldit, citizen science, eBird, open access, arXiv, PLoS
8. The Challenge of Doing Science in the Open
  Complexity Zoo, academic publishing, Bayh–Dole Act
9. The Open Science Imperative
  Open science, academic journal publishing reform, SPIRES

appendix - The problem solved by the Polymath Project

== Reviews ==
Timo Hannay's review in Nature said that in this book Nielsen gives "the most compelling and comprehensive case so far for a new approach to science in the Internet age".

The Financial Times review said that the book was "the most compelling manifesto yet for the transformative power of networked science".
