= Zooniverse =

Citizen science platform

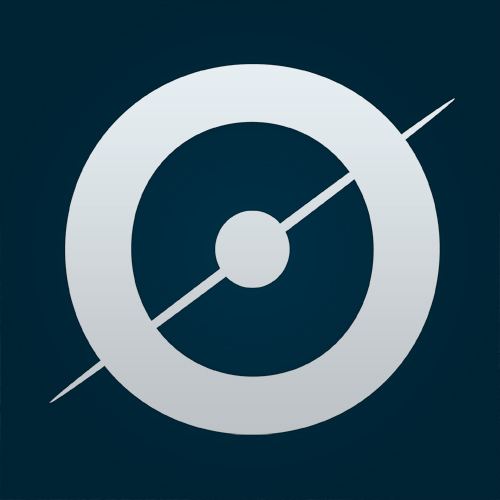
- Website type: Citizen science web portal
- Available in: English, German, Polish
- Owner: Citizen Science Alliance
- Creator: Fingerprint Digital Media
- Website: www.zooniverse.org
- Commercial: No
- Registration: Optional
- Launched: 12 December 2009; 16 years ago
- Current status: Online

Zooniverse is a global platform for people-powered research, also known as participatory science or citizen science. It is a collaboration between Chicago’s Adler Planetarium, the University of Oxford, and the University of Minnesota. It is home to some of the Internet's largest, most popular and most successful citizen science projects.

== Background ==
The organization grew from the original Galaxy Zoo project and now hosts dozens of projects which allow volunteers to participate in crowdsourced scientific research. It has headquarters at Oxford University and the Adler Planetarium. Unlike many early internet-based citizen science projects (such as SETI@home) which used spare computer processing power to analyse data, known as volunteer computing, Zooniverse projects require the active participation of human volunteers to complete research tasks. Projects have been drawn from disciplines including astronomy, ecology, cell biology, humanities, and climate science.

As of 14 February 2014, the Zooniverse community consisted of more than 1 million registered volunteers. By March 2025, the number had risen to over 2.7 million. The volunteers are often collectively referred to as "Zooites". The data collected from the various projects has led to the publication of more than 450 peer-reviewed research publications. A daily news website called 'The Daily Zooniverse' provides information on the different projects under the Zooniverse umbrella, and has a presence on social media.

The founder and former principal investigator (P.I.) of the project, Chris Lintott, published a book called The Crowd & the Cosmos: Adventures in the Zooniverse in 2019. In September 2023 the role of P.I. was taken over by Laura Trouille, VP of Science Engagement at the Adler Planetarium, who was co-P.I. for Zooniverse from 2015 to 2023.

== Project Builder ==
Zooniverse supports Project Builder, a tool that allows anyone to create their own project by uploading a dataset of images, video files or sound files. In Project Builder a Project Owner creates a workflow for the projects, a tutorial, a field guide and the talk forum of the Project and can add collaborators, researchers and moderators to their project. The moderators for example will have partial administrator rights in the talk, but cannot change anything concerning the workflow.

== Zooniverse Mobile App ==
Only certain kinds of projects can be enabled on Zooniverse mobile app (Android & iOS).

== Projects ==
=== Art projects ===
Logo	Project	Type	Description	Launch date
	AnnoTate	Annotate	Volunteers on Zooniverse can help transcribe/annotate papers from many British artists. This project has over 50,000 documents from the Tate Archive.	1 Sep 2015
	Scribes of the Cairo Geniza	Classify	Volunteers classify old scripts written in Hebrew and Arabic. This helps prepare the scripts for annotation. The second phase of this project is being planned to launch in Spring 2018, which includes annotation. This project was launched by University of Pennsylvania Libraries, the Princeton Geniza Project, the Library of the Jewish Theological Seminary, and the Genizah at Cambridge University Library	8 Aug 2017
	Criminal Characters	Transcription	Volunteers help in investigating the criminal careers and life histories of Australian offenders from the end of the convict period through to the Second World War.	6 May 2019
	Davy Notebook Project	Transcription and Filteration	Volunteers help to transcribe the manuscript notebooks of Sir Humphry Davy – one of the most significant and famous figures in the scientific and literary culture of early nineteenth-century Britain, Europe, and America.	11 Jul 2019
	Saint George on a Bike	Transcription	Help scientists collect data for training an automatic caption generator for European visual art (paintings, prints, etc.) dating from the 12th to the 18th century	29 Mar 2022
	Poets & Lovers	Transcription	Poets & Lovers aims to transcribe the diaries and related papers of two major women poets of the fin de siècle, Katherine Harris Bradley and Edith Emma Cooper, who published as "Michael Field". Much of this material has only been accessible through archives in the United Kingdom until now. This project made their material freely available to all readers in standards-compliant web and downloadable formats.	21 June 2022

=== Space projects ===
Logo	Project	Type	Description	Launch date
	Galaxy Zoo	Decision tree	The fourth and latest incarnation of the Galaxy Zoo project, in which users are shown images of a galaxy and then asked a series of questions to classify its morphology. The current sample includes images of high-redshift galaxies taken by the Hubble Space Telescope and low-redshift galaxies from the Sloan Digital Sky Survey in New Mexico.	12 Jul 2007
	Planet Hunters	Annotation	Identifying extrasolar planets from the light curves of stars recorded by the Kepler space telescope.	16 Dec 2010
	Planet Four	Annotation	Analyze images of the surface of Mars, taken near the Martian southern polar cap. Classifications include marking fans and blotches caused by sublimating gas and geysers underneath the carbon dioxide ice. Images come from the HiRISE camera on board the Mars Reconnaissance Orbiter.	8 Jan 2013
	Planet Four: Terrains	Filtering	Analyze images of the surface of Mars, taken by the low resolution Context camera on board the Mars Reconnaissance Orbiter, to identify future targets for the spacecraft's higher resolution HiRISE camera to investigate.	1 July 2015
	Radio Meteor Zoo	Annotation	Help identify meteors in radio data detected by the Belgian Radio Meteor Stations.	12 Aug 2016
	Backyard Worlds: Planet 9	Classifying	Help scan the realm beyond Neptune for brown dwarfs and Planet Nine. Images come from NASA's Wide-field Infrared Survey Explorer (WISE) mission.	15 Feb 2017
	SuperWASP Variable Stars	Filtering	Help in identifying the most unusual variable stars by classifying light curves recorded by SuperWASP.	5 Sep 2018
	Zwicky's Quirky Transients	Filtering	Volunteers search for rare and unusual transients from data taken by the Zwicky Transient Facility.	23 Jan 2019
	Disk Detective 2.0	Filtering	Spot the disks around nearby stars where planets form and dwell.	2019
	Radio Galaxy Zoo: LOFAR	Annotation	Volunteers help in finding supermassive black holes, starforming galaxies and active galactic nuclei from data gathered by the Low-Frequency Array (LOFAR) radio telescope.	25 Feb 2020
	AI4 Mars	Annotation	Help scientists teach mars rover how to identify martian terrain using artificial intelligence.	23 Jun 2020
	Burst From Space	Filtering	Volunteers help in finding Fast Radio Bursts from data detected by the CHIME telescope and to train machine learning software to learn to detect such bursts on their own.	30 Oct 2020
	Citizen ASAS-SN	Filtering	Classify the light curves of variable stars and help researchers find the most unusual ones.	5 Jan 2021
	Dark Energy Explorers	Filtering	Volunteers identify distant galaxies to help measure dark energy when the universe was just ~2-3 billion years old.	23 Feb 2021
	Active Asteroids	Filtering	Examine images from DECam to find comet-like tails, with the aim being to identify active asteroids.	31 Aug 2021
	Planet Hunters NGTS	Filtering	Identify extrasolar planets by analysing light curves recorded with the Next-Generation Transit Survey.	18 Oct 2021
	SuperWASP: Black Hole Hunters	Filtering	Finding black holes by searching for symmetrical peaks in brightness of light curves of stars caused by gravitational microlensing.	26 Oct 2021
	Bursts from Space: MeerKAT	Filtering	Help in discovering and identifying compact objects, stellar flares, supernovae and their remnants, kilonovae, fast radio bursts, distant galaxies with active centres and more from data gathered by the MeerKAT telescope.	7 Dec 2021
	Solar Jet Hunter	Annotation	Study images of solar jets, small coronal mass ejections from the Sun, taken by the Solar Dynamics Observatory.	7 December 2021
	Rosetta Zoo	Annotation	Find changes on Comet 67P/Churyumov–Gerasimenko by analyzing images from the Rosetta spacecraft and to aid understanding of the history of the Solar System.	5 May 2022
	Jovian Vortex Hunter	Annotation/Filtering	Volunteers help find interesting cloud features on Jupiter.	20 June 2022
	Cloudspotting on Mars	Annotation	Volunteers search for mesospheric clouds on Mars with data from the Mars Climate Sounder on the Mars Reconnaissance Orbiter.	28 June 2022
	Gems of the Galaxy Zoos	Filtering	Zoogems was a gap-filler project which used the Hubble Space Telescope to take images of unusual objects found by volunteers classifying data from both Galaxy Zoo (GZ) and Radio Galaxy Zoo (RGZ). It ended in 2023.	2 February 2018
	Gaia Vari	Annotation/Filtering	Volunteers uncover the secrets of the Universe from the ESA Gaia mission	13 June 2022
	Gravity Spy	Annotation/Filtering	Volunteers help scientists at LIGO search for gravitational waves, the elusive ripples of spacetime.	9 March 2016
	Solar Active Region Spotter	Annotation/Filtering	Study the evolution of sunspots to discover new active regions and predict solar eruptions.	21 March 2023
	The Daily Minor Planet	Classify	Volunteers work together to discover new asteroids in daily updated images from the Catalina Sky Survey!	2023
	Kilonova Seekers	Filtering	Volunteers examine candidates from the Gravitational-wave Optical Transient Observer to identify kilonovae, supernovae, and other transients in real time.	11 July 2023
	AuroraZoo	Classifying	Volunteers help researchers by examining short 5 second videos of fine-scale aurora from the Auroral Structure and Kinetics (ASK) instrument from Svalbard, to research how energy is transferred from space to Earth's atmosphere.	28 April 2020

=== Nature and climate projects ===
Logo	Project	Type	Description	Launch date
	Snapshot Serengeti	Filtering	Classifying animals at the Serengeti National Park in Tanzania using images gathered from 225 camera traps. The purpose is to study how species are distributed across the landscape and interact with each other.	11 Dec 2012
	Notes from Nature	Transcription	Transcribing museum records to obtain historical biodiversity data.	22 Apr 2013
	Floating Forests	Annotation	Volunteers look at satellite images to search for large masses of giant kelp in coastal ocean environments.	8 Aug 2014
	Chicago Wildlife Watch	Annotation	Volunteers assist Lincoln Park Zoo to review millions of motion sensor images to identify and study wild animals in the urban environment.	11 Sep 2014
	Penguin Watch	Annotation	Remote camera images of areas in the Southern Ocean and Antarctic Peninsula are tagged for detections of penguins of various species. Scientists aim to measure changes in the timing of penguin breeding, nest survival rates, the rates of predation on penguin chicks, and determining where colonies overwinter at breeding sites.	17 Sep 2014
	Chimp & See	Annotation	By identifying individual chimpanzees from videos and highlighting examples of tool use and other behaviour patterns help scientists, from the Max Planck Institute for Evolutionary Anthropology, understand chimp culture, population size and demographics in specific regions of Africa.	22 April 2015
	Wildebeest Watch	Filtering	Interpret the movement of wildebeest in images from camera traps in the Serengeti National Park to help scientists better map their migration movements and to understand the collective intelligence of herds.	1 July 2015
	Whales as Individuals	Annotation	Mark details on photographs of whale flukes to identify individual animals and to help computers learn to do the same.	1 July 2015
	Wildcam Gorongosa	Annotation	Identify animals in trail camera photographs taken in the Gorongosa National Park in Mozambique.	1 September 2015
	Fossil Finder	Annotation	Document surface images from fossil bearing landscapes in the Turkana Basin in northern Kenya to identify potential sites of fossils and stone tools for further investigation.	November 2015
	Snapshot Wisconsin (formerly, Wisconsin Wildlife Watch)	Annotation	Examine images from camera traps placed by Wisconsin Department of Natural Resources on volunteers' property to identify animals and help scientists better understand trends in the distribution of wildlife populations in the state.	8 January 2016
	Western Shield - Camera Watch	Annotation	Examine camera trap images from western Australia to help the Western Shield project manage the impact of feral foxes and cats on the regions' native wildlife.	7 April 2016
	Beluga Bits	Decision Tree	Examine underwater photos of wild Beluga whale and identify the age, sex, group size and look for identifying marks to recognize beluga that return to this location year after year.	11 June 2018
	PELIcams	Filtering and Annotation	Volunteers examine images from Gunnison Island located in the Great Salt Lake to learn more about the nesting behaviours, extreme weather and predators of the American white pelican.	14 September 2018
	Nebraska Wildlife Watch	Filtering	Volunteers classify images of Nebraskan wildlife and help find and locate Eastern spotted skunks in Nebraska.	24 October 2018
	Cedar Creek: Eyes on the Wild	Filtering	Volunteers help in identifying the wildlife of the Cedar Creek Ecosystem Science Reserve.	20 December 2018
	Notes from Nature - WeDigFLPlants	Transcription	Volunteers help scientists to understand changes to the distribution and abundance of the flora of Florida, especially the components that are rare/endangered or introduced/invasive or of high economic value. The data gathered from this projectare also critical to curators of herbaria who manage the specimens for use in perpetuity.	9 May 2019
	Notes from Nature - CalBug	Transcription	In 2010, funded by the National Science Foundation, the eight major terrestrial arthropod collections in California formed CalBug, a collaborative effort to digitize and georeference insects and spiders collected throughout California, adding hundreds of thousands of records to the In 2010, funded by the National Science Foundation, the eight major terrestrial arthropod collections in California formed CalBug, a collaborative effort to digitize and georeference insects and spiders collected throughout California, adding hundreds of thousands of records to the California Terrestrial Arthropods Database.	9 May 2019
	Wildlife of Los Angeles	Filteration	Volunteers help in identifying Urban wildlife in Los Angeles in order to help city planners to make educated decisions about wildlife when planning future developments.	14 May 2019
	Mapping Change	Annotation	Transcribe data from hand-written museum specimen labels to map biodiversity in the Midwestern US, to measure climate change. This data will become part of the Minnesota Biodiversity Atlas, the permanent digital record of the Bell Museum of Natural History's collections.	20 Sep 2020
	Nest Quest Go: Swifts and Swallows	Annotation	Transcribe data from hand-written nest record cards relating to swifts and swallows into a database operated by the Cornell Lab of Ornithology	11 Jan 2021
	Nest Quest Go: Tree Swallows	Annotation	Transcribe data from hand-written nest record cards relating to tree swallows into a database operated by the Cornell Lab of Ornithology	07 Nov 2022
	Beavers from Space	Annotation	Identify beavers in satellite images of the waterways of Canada to create more resilient watersheds	04 Apr 2023
	FlyTunes	Filtering	Identify sounds in audio clips to assist in research about how road noise is impacting UK wildlife	13 February 2024

=== Biology Projects ===
Logo	Project	Type	Description	Launch date
	Etch a Cell	Drawing	Volunteers draw around an object of interest, such as a cell membrane or mitochondria in images taken with an electron microscope at the Francis Crick Institute.	6 Apr 2017

=== Humanities projects ===
Logo	Project	Type	Description	Launch date
	Emigrant City	Transcription	Explore the history of New York City by transcribing mortgage and bond ledgers of the Emigrant Savings Bank from between 1851 and 1921, held by the New York Public Library.	1 December 2015
	Measuring the ANZACs	Transcription	Transcribe documents to help create a comprehensive database of New Zealand war history, comprising the names, jobs, birthplaces and health at enlistment of Australian and New Zealand soldiers in the New Zealand Army during World War One.	14 August 2015
	Beyond borders: Transcribing historical Maine land documents	Transcription	Create full-text transcriptions of manuscripts dated 1625 to 1893 from Pejepscot Proprietors, Kennebec Proprietors and Barclay collections.	Summer 2020
	World Architecture Unlocked	Transcription	Transcribe collections of architectural photography to create a digitised collection.	27 Oct 2020
	Addressing Health	Transcription	Transcribe the health histories of Victorian postal workers in order to find out how ill health affected the working lives of thousands of postal workers.	26 Jan 2021
	Voices Through Time: The Story of Care	Transcription	Transcribe the records of Coram, the UK's first children's charity, to tell the story of care from where it began.	7 Dec 2021

=== Physics projects ===
Logo	Project	Type	Description	Launch date
	Gravity Spy	Filtering	Volunteers classify different types of noise to improve the sensitivity of gravitational-wave detectors and help scientists at the LIGO and Virgo interferometers search for gravitational waves.	12 Oct 2016
	Steelpan Vibrations	Drawing	Help classify vibration patterns on the Caribbean Steelpan to learn more about how this drum works.	23 Aug 2017
	New Particle Search at CERN	Annotation	Volunteers attempt to locate deflected vertices, electron, muon and photon signatures, and Higgs bosons, training machine learning algorithms on still images of collisions and particle decay in the ATLAS experiment at the Large Hadron Collider run by CERN.	19 October 2021
	GWitchHunters	Filtering	Volunteers classify different types of noise to better understand gravitational waves detected by the Virgo interferometer and LIGO.	16 November 2021
	Cosmic Muon Images	Annotation	Volunteers annotate graphs to find particle tracks as part of muon tomography experiments.	11 January 2022

== Retired projects ==
Logo	Project	Type	Description	Launch date	End date
	Solar Stormwatch	Annotation	The project uses data including video imagery from the twin STEREO spacecraft to track the formation and evolution of coronal mass ejections.	21 Dec 2009	—
	AnnoTate	Annotate	Volunteers on Zooniverse can help transcribe/annotate papers from many British artists. This project has over 50,000 documents from the Tate Archive.	1 Sep 2015	—
	Galaxy Zoo Mergers	Pattern matching	Compared images of galaxies discovered by the original Galaxy Zoo to simulations to study the dynamics of interacting galaxies.	23 Nov 2009	25 Jun 2012
	Galaxy Zoo Supernovae	Annotation	Used data from the Palomar Transient Factory survey to search for supernovae for quick follow-up study by telescopes around the world.	13 Aug 2009	3 Aug 2012
	Ice Hunters	Annotation	Identified Kuiper belt objects (KBOs) for potential future targets for the New Horizons spacecraft. Also identified variable stars and asteroids. It made use of human review of subtracted images from various telescopes.	21 Jun 2011	early 2012
	Old Weather Phases One & Two	Transcription	Between October 2010 and July 2012, some 16,400 volunteers transcribed the weather data from 1,090,745 pages of the log books of World War 1 era Royal Navy ships. The project generated 1.6 million weather observations that will be used to improve climate modelling.	12 Oct 2010	23 Jul 2012
	Andromeda Project	Annotation	Used images from the Hubble Space Telescope to identify star clusters in the Andromeda Galaxy as well as background distant galaxies hidden in the star fields.	5 Dec 2012	30 Oct 2013
	Moon Zoo	Annotation	High-resolution images of the Moon's surface provided by the Lunar Reconnaissance Orbiter are used by volunteers to create detailed crater counts, mapping the variation in age of lunar rocks.	16 Feb 2009	Mar 2016
	Space Warps	Annotation	Searched for gravitational lenses created by massive galaxies in distant space.	8 May 2013	2014
	Star Date: M83	Annotation	Described the shapes and colors of star clusters in the Southern Pinwheel Galaxy (M83) using images from the Hubble Space Telescope.	13 Jan 2014	2014
	Whale FM	Pattern matching	Categorized the sounds made by killer whales and followed the travels of individual animals around the oceans. Volunteers heard an audio clip of the whale sounds and viewed the data as a spectrogram. The project was run in conjunction with Scientific American.	29 Nov 2011	Mar 2015
	Seafloor Explorer	Filtering	Identified species and ground cover in images of the seafloor to create a library of seafloor habitats. The images were from a robotic camera that mapped the seafloor off the coast of the northeastern United States.	13 Sep 2012	
	Galaxy Zoo: Bar Lengths	Annotation	Identify and measure the bars in spiral galaxies from 8,000 images taken by the Hubble Space Telescope.	1 July 2015	—
	Higgs Hunters	Annotation	Uncover the building blocks of the universe. Help search for unknown exotic particles in the Large Hadron Collider data.	26 Nov 2014	—
	The Milky Way Project	Annotation	Detecting bubbles in the interstellar medium which indicate regions where the early stages of star formation are taking place. The project uses infrared images from the Spitzer Space Telescope, as well as sub-millimetre data from Herschel.	7 Dec 2010	—
	Mutual Muses	Annotate	Users can help transcribe letters between Lawrence Alloway and Sylvia Sleigh. Users transcribe one page at a time.	1 Aug 2017	
Logo for the 'Parochial Archive Project in Rome' hosted on Zooniverse.org	Parochial Archive Project in Rome	Annotate	Users can help transcribe documents from various Roman parochial sources dating back to the 16th and 17th century. Users transcribe one folio at a time.	12 Dec 2017	
	Shakespeare's World	Annotate	Users help annotate and transcribe many documents from William Shakespeare's time. This project helps users and Oxford learn what life was like for Shakespeare and his comrades.	10 Dec 2015	-
	Disk Detective	Filtering	Identify dusty debris disks in the Milky Way galaxy that indicate stars in the process of forming planetary systems. Images come from NASA's WISE telescope, as well as the DSS2 and 2MASS surveys.	30 Jan 2014	—
	Old Weather	Transcription	Zooites use a special interface to digitally transcribe weather and sea ice data from the log books of United States Arctic exploration and research ships, that were at sea between 1850 and 1950. The current data is the third phase of the project.	12 Oct 2010	—
	Cyclone Center	Decision tree	Classifying tropical cyclones by using a modified version of the Dvorak Technique. Volunteers are shown a series of images from infrared sensors on weather satellites and asked a number of questions to identify the type and strength of the storm.	27 Sep 2012	—
	Bat Detective	Pattern matching	Monitor the status of bat populations by classifying the sounds they make for echolocation and social purposes. The data are originally recorded using ultrasonic microphones; calls are played back at a slower speed within the range of human hearing; data are also shown visually in the form of a spectrogram.	1 Oct 2012	—
	Plankton Portal	Filtering	Classifying plankton from images gathered by the In Situ Ichthyoplankton Imaging System to understand how plankton types are distributed at a variety of ocean depths. The information can be used to map oceanic carbon dioxide levels, as plankton provide a valid indicator.	27 Sep 2013	—
	Condor Watch	Annotation	Examine motion-capture images from Pinnacles National Park in northern California. Volunteers identify California condors and mark the distance to feeding sources such as animal carcasses.	15 Apr 2014	—
	Orchid Observers	Transcription	Photograph wild orchids throughout the summer of 2015 and/or annotate images and transcribe data from the orchid collection of the Natural History Museum, London.	23 Apr 2015	—
	Jungle Rhythms	Transcription	Transcribe hand-drawn observations, made between 1937 and 1958, of life cycle events for over 2,000 trees in the tropical forests of the Democratic Republic of the Congo.	February 2016	—
	Ancient Lives	Transcription	Transcribing texts in Greek from the Oxyrhynchus Papyri. The papyri belong to the Egypt Exploration Society and their texts will eventually be published and numbered in Society's Greco-Roman Memoirs series.	26 Jul 2011	—
	Operation War Diary	Transcription	Transcribe British war diaries from World War I, helping historians to track troop movements, add to catalogue metadata, and delve into individual experiences of soldiers.	14 Jan 2014	—
	Science Gossip	Annotation	Classify illustrations from the pages of early science journals and periodicals digitized by the Biodiversity Heritage Library.	2015	—
	Cell Slider	Annotation	Using images from Cancer Research UK volunteers help to classify archived cancer samples.	24 Oct 2012	—
	Worm Watch Lab	Annotation	Watch videos of nematode worms to collect genetic data that will assist medical research. The classifications offer data to researchers on brain and gene function. The nematode species studied is Caenorhabditis elegans.	3 Jul 2013	—
	Asteroid Zoo	Annotation	Examine sets of time-lapsed images to search for moving objects that could be undiscovered asteroids. Data comes from the Catalina Sky Survey telescopes in Arizona. The project is run in conjunction with Planetary Resources, which is focused on developing technology for asteroid mining.	24 Jun 2014	—
	Radio Galaxy Zoo	Annotation	Identify radio-wavelength images of astrophysical jets in galaxies that are powered by accretion onto a black hole. The task is to correctly associate any radio components with an infrared image of the black hole's host galaxy.	17 Dec 2013	—
	Sunspotter	Ranking	Examine images of sunspots and rank pairs of images according to their relative complexity. The science goal is to examine how the complexity of sunspots evolves over time and how they produce eruptions. Data for the project comes from the Michelson Doppler Instrument aboard the SOHO spacecraft.	27 Feb 2014	—
	SETILive	Annotation	SETILive was a project which attempted to use humans to identify potential signals from intelligent extraterrestrial life which may be missed by computer algorithms. The data came from radio observations by the Allen Telescope Array of stars in the Kepler field of view.	29 Feb 2012	12 Oct 2014
	Health Record Hiccups	Pattern matching	Used human pattern-spotting skills to identify sudden, unexpected changes in 7959 electronic health records for temporal data quality issues caused by "infrastructure" changes.	2 Sep 2020	23 Oct 2020

== See also ==
- Amateur exoplanet discoveries
- 9Spitch – Galaxy in the constellation Cetus
- AWI0005x3s – Red dwarf star in the constellation Carina
- LSPM J0207+3331 – Star in the constellation Taurus
- Hanny's Voorwerp – Astronomical object appearing as a bright blob, discovered by Hanny van Arkel
- Green Pea Galaxies – Possible type of luminous blue compact galaxy
- K2-138 – Star in the constellation Aquarius
- PH1b – Circumbinary Neptunian planet orbiting the Kepler-64 star system
- Stargazing Live – Live BBC television programme
- Tabby's Star – Star noted for unusual dimming events
