= The Daily Minor Planet =

Citizen science project

- Website type: Citizen science Project
- Available in: English, German, French, Russian, Turkish, Japanese, Italian, Hindi, and Arabic
- Creators: David Carson Fuls; D. C. Fuls, et al.
- Website: https://www.zooniverse.org/projects/fulsdavid/the-daily-minor-planet/about/research
- Commercial: No
- Registration: Yes, not mandatory
- Current status: Ongoing

The Daily Minor Planet is a citizen science project run by the Zooniverse and The Catalina Sky Survey with a funding grant from NASA, to use citizen science volunteer classifications to discover asteroids with recent data from the G96 Mount Lemmon Survey 1.52 m (60 in) cassegrain reflector telescope. The main objective of the project is to search for undiscovered asteroids in order to protect the planet by locating potentially harmful Near-Earth asteroids.

The main-belt asteroid 227711 Dailyminorplanet was named in honor of thousands of volunteers who have participated in this project.

The Daily Minor Planet Zooniverse project now has two workflows of data for volunteers to analyze with the inclusion of images taken by the 2.3-meter Bok Telescope (V00) at Kitt Peak National Observatory as of March 2026.

== List of Notable Discoveries ==
Asteroid Designation	Orbit or Family	Semi- major axis (AU)	Eccentricity of orbit	Diameter (m)	Discovery date	Refs
2023 VN3	Apollo	1.2166279	0.2142180	26.17	2023-11-05	MPC · JPL
2023 TW	Aten	0.8458886	0.2912585	9.30	2023-10-04	MPC · JPL
2024 SN3	Aten	0.9150081	0.1096303	11.02	2024-09-22	MPC · JPL
2025 HD3	Aten	0.8316599	0.4446249	23.78	2025-04-24	MPC · JPL
2025 KU1	Apollo	1.0738396	0.0810991	15.10	2025-05-22	MPC · JPL
2026 KS3	Amor	1.6766994	0.3666147	62.51	2026-05-23	MPC · JPL

== See also ==
- Backyard Worlds
- Active Asteroids (citizen science project)
- Disk Detective
- Galaxy Zoo
- Planet Hunters
