= WISE J080822.18−644357.3 =

Red dwarf star in the constellation Carina

J080822.18-644357.3
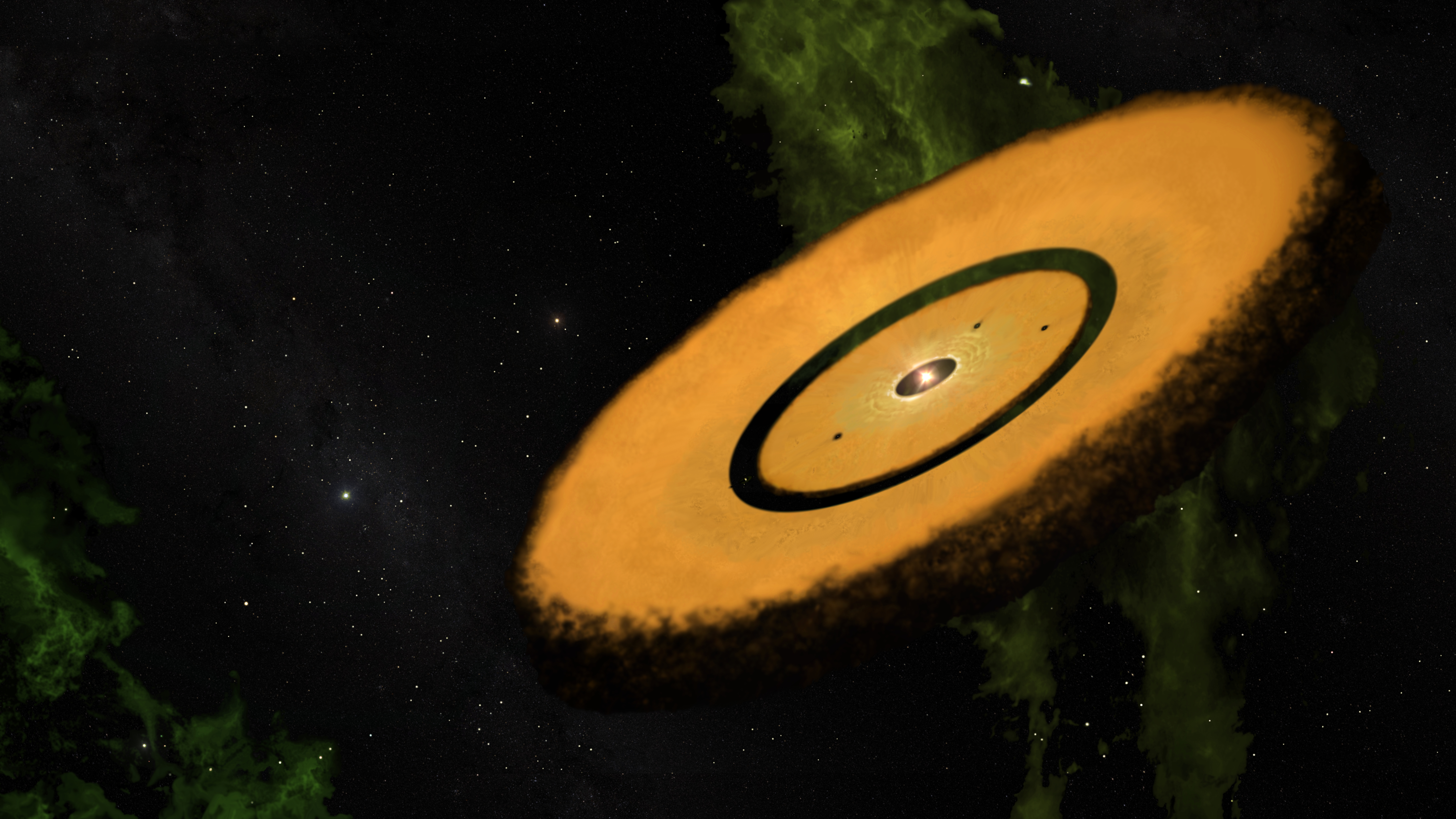
- Artist's depiction of J080822.18-644357.3; Credit: NASA/Jonathan Holden

Observation data Epoch J2000 Equinox ICRS
- Constellation: Volans
- Right ascension: 08^{h} 08^{m} 22.18^{s}
- Declination: −64° 43′ 57.3″
- Apparent magnitude (V): 17.51

Characteristics
- Evolutionary stage: red dwarf
- Spectral type: M5.5V

Astrometry
Radial velocity (R_{v})	22.7±0.5 km/s
Proper motion (μ)	RA: −11.54±0.12 mas/yr Dec.: 25.61±0.10 mas/yr
Parallax (π)	9.8599±0.0551 mas
Distance	331 ly (101.4±0.6 pc)

Details
Mass	0.16+0.03 −0.04 M_{☉}
Radius	0.31 R_{☉}
Luminosity	0.01 L_{☉}
Surface gravity (log g)	4.92 cgs
Temperature	3,050±100 K
Age	45^{+11}_{−7} Myr

Other designations
- WISE J080822.18-644357.3

Database references
SIMBAD	data

WISE J080822.18-644357.3, also called J0808, is a 45^{+11}_{−7} Myr old star system in the constellation Volans with a circumstellar debris disk orbiting an M-type red dwarf about 331 lightyears from Earth.

On October 21, 2016, NASA's Goddard Space Flight Center announced that its citizen science project, Disk Detective, discovered a debris disk around J0808, using the WISE telescope, a M5.5V dwarf with significant infrared excess at both 12 and 22 μm. Classified as Peter Pan disk number AWI0005x3s in the project database—or 5x3s for short—a BANYAN II Bayesian analysis revealed (with 93.9% probability) the star's radial velocity as 20.6 ± 1.4 km/s, associating it with Carina's ~45 Myr old young moving group. Since most M-dwarf debris disks fade in less than 30 million years, this would be the oldest M dwarf debris disk detected in a moving group, implying a change in understanding of constraint in M-dwarf debris disk evolution.

A follow-up study with an optical spectrum obtained with the ANU Siding Spring 2.3 meter telescope showed a Li-rich M5-star with strong Hα emission. The data is consistent with a low accretion of 10^{−10} M_{☉} yr ^{−1}. ALMA observations did not detect any carbon monoxide, but unresolved 1.3 mm dust emission was detected. Observations with CTIO showed a strong flare and variations in the Paschen-β and Brackett-γ lines, which is a clear sign of accretion.

== Debris disk ==
The fitting of a modeled disk with the Spectral Energy Distribution of J0808 indicates a disk temperature of about 263 K (-10 °C or 14 °F). The follow-up study found that a single disk had a poor match with the 22 μm data. The researchers found a better match with a "warm" outer disk with a temperature of about 240 K (-33 °C or -28 °F) and a "hot" inner disk with a temperature of about 1100 K (827 °C or 1520 °F). The warm outer disk is located around 0.115 au and the hot inner disk is located around 0.0056 au. The hot inner disk is likely the source of accreted material. The temperature of the inner disk is comparable to temperatures where amorphous silicates anneal into crystalline form. The inner disk also lies near the Roche limit of the red dwarf and therefore the inner disk could be the result of disrupted planetesimals. The warm outer disk could be similar to dust belts seen around B- to K-type stars, which have temperatures around 190 K and which likely represent small dust grains of sublimating ice from icy planetesimals.

ALMA detected a third component with a temperature of 20 K (-253 °C or -424 °F). Using this temperature the researchers were able to estimate the dust mass to 0.057±0.006 M_{☉}. This is higher than the disk mass around ~20 Myr old AU Microscopii and the ~50 Myr old GJ 182, but smaller than the ~10 Myr old TWA 7. The disk has a radius smaller than 16 au. The missing CO detection is explained with two possible scenarios: Either dust grains are released in a collisional cascade induced by the collisions of km-sized planetesimals or a recent collision of planetary bodies generated a large amount of small dust grains.

A light curve from CTIO shows variations, which could be disk material blocking light from the star. The TESS light curve shows aperiodic dipping on timescales of 0.5–2 days.

== Peter Pan disks ==
Other stars and brown dwarfs were discovered to be similar to J0808, with signs of youth while being in an older moving group. Together with J0808, these older low-mass accretors in nearby moving groups are being called Peter Pan disks.

== Gallery ==
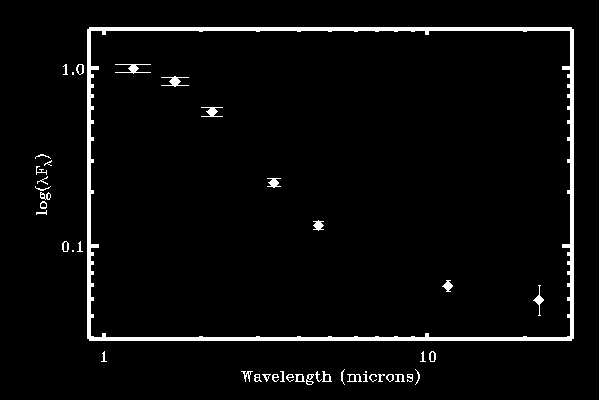
Spectral Energy Distribution (SED) of J0808 (from Disk Detective talk page)

== See also ==
- Peter Pan Disk
- Disk Detective
- HD 74389 another system discovered by Disk Detective volunteers
- Debris disk
- Protoplanetary disk
- Accretion disk
- T Tauri star
- Goddard Space Flight Center
- Citizen science
