= Peter Pan disk =

Type of circumstellar disk

A Peter Pan disk is a circumstellar disk around a star or brown dwarf that appears to have retained enough gas to form a gas giant planet for much longer than the typically assumed gas dispersal timescale of approximately 5 million years. Several examples of such disks have been observed to orbit stars with spectral types of M or later. The presence of gas around these disks has generally been inferred from the total amount of radiation emitted from the disk at infrared wavelengths, and/or spectroscopic signatures of hydrogen accreting onto the star. To fit one specific definition of a Peter Pan disk, the source needs to have an infrared "color" of $Ks-W4>2$, an age of >20 Myr and spectroscopic evidence of accretion.

In 2016 volunteers of the Disk Detective project, led by Dr. Steven Silverberg of the University of Oklahoma, discovered WISE J080822.18-644357.3 (or J0808). This low-mass star showed signs of youth, for example a strong infrared excess and active accretion of gaseous material. It is part of the 45^{+11}_{−7} Myr old Carina young moving group, older than expected for these characteristics of an M-dwarf. Other stars and brown dwarfs were discovered to be similar to J0808, with signs of youth while being in an older moving group. Together with J0808, these older low-mass accretors in nearby moving groups have been called Peter Pan disks in one scientific paper published in early 2020. Since then the term was used by other independent research groups.

== Name ==
Peter Pan disks are named after the main character Peter Pan in the play and book Peter Pan; or, the Boy Who Wouldn't Grow Up, written by J.M. Barrie in 1904. The Peter Pan disks have a young appearance, while being old in years. In other words: The Peter Pan disks "refuse to grow up", a feature they share with the Lost Boys and titular character in Peter Pan.

== Characteristics ==
The known Peter Pan disks have the H-alpha spectroscopic line as a sign of accretion. J0808 shows variations in the Paschen-β and Brackett-γ lines, which is a clear sign of accretion. It was also identified as lithium-rich, which is a sign of youth. Two peter pan disks (J0808 and J0632) show variation due to material from the disk blocking the light of the star. J0808 and J0501 also showed flares. Some of the Peter Pan disks (J0446, J0949, LDS 5606 and J1915) are binaries or suspected binaries. J0226 is a candidate brown dwarf and Delorme 1 (AB)b is a planetary-mass object in a circumbinary orbit. A detailed study of J0446B with JWST MIRI detected 9 hydrocarbons, two nitrogen-bearing species, two isotopes of CO_{2}, molecular hydrogen and two noble gases. Neon and molecular hydrogen strongly supports the idea that this disk is a long-lived primordial disk. Delorme 1 (AB)b similarly shows a carbon-rich disk. Additionally an outflow of molecular hydrogen, possibly a disk wind, was detected around the planet.

It was suggested that Peter Pan disks take longer to dissipate due to lower photoevaporation caused by lower far-ultraviolet and X-ray emission coming from the M-dwarf. Modelling has shown that disk can survive for 50 Myrs around stars with a mass less than 0.6 M_{☉} and in low-radiation environments. At higher masses of 0.6 to 0.8 M_{☉} the stars form an inner gap before 50 Myr, preventing accretion. Observations with the Chandra X-ray Observatory showed that Peter Pan Disks have a similar X-ray luminosity as field M-dwarfs, with properties similar to weak-lined T Tauri stars. The researchers of this study concluded that the current X-ray luminosity of Peter Pan disk cannot explain their old age. The old age of the disk could be the result of weaker far-ultraviolet flux incident on the disk, due to weaker accretion in the pre-main sequence stage. It was proposed that disks do form with a lifetime distribution, with some disks only existing for a few Myrs and others for dozens of Myrs. This would explain why some >20 Myr old M-dwarfs show accretion due to a disk, but not all M-dwarfs of this age. The research team found an initial disk fraction of 65% for M-dwarfs (M3.7-M6) and the disk lifetime distribution matches a Gaussian or Weibull distribution.

== Known Peter Pan disks ==
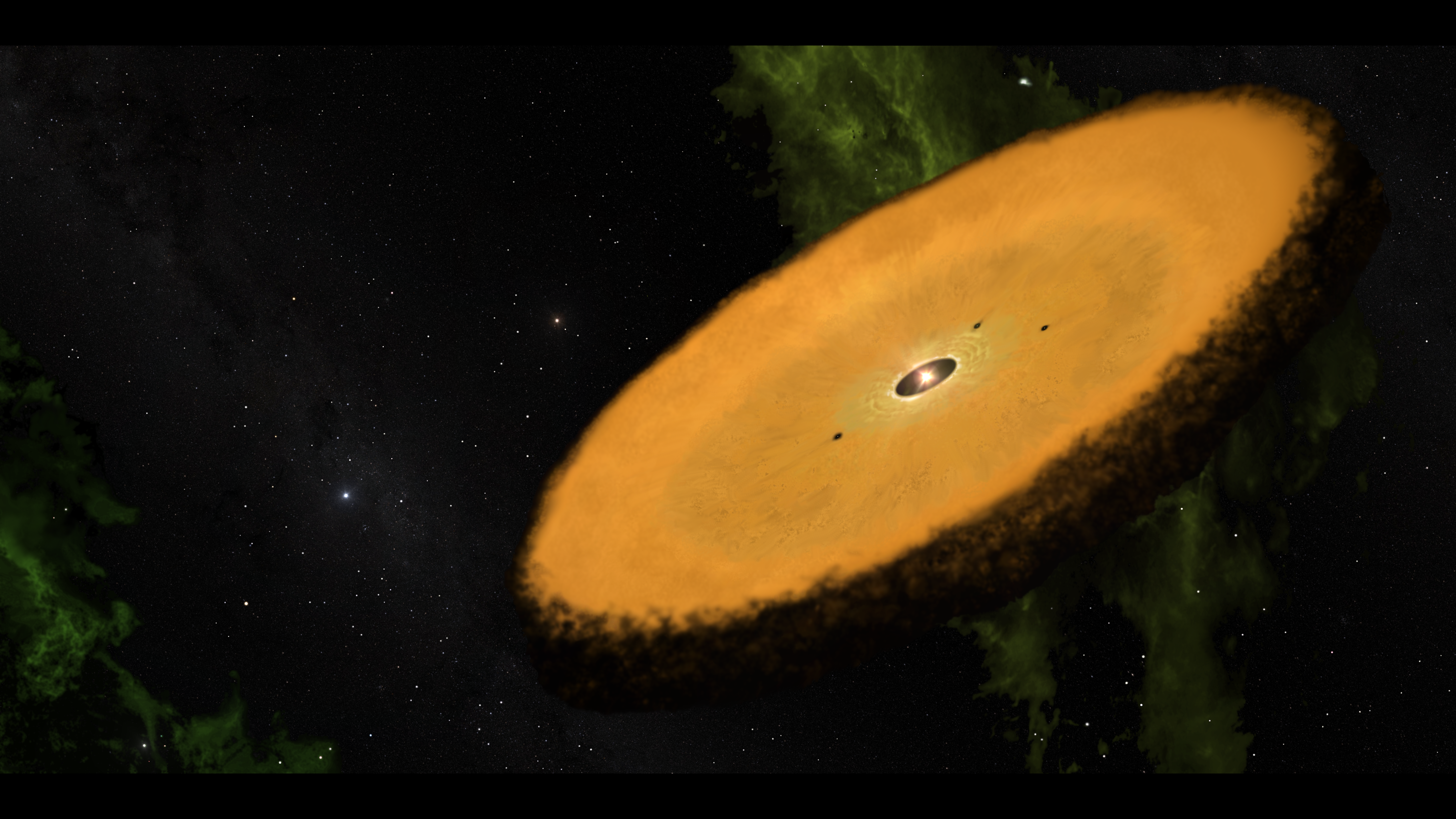
Artist's Impression of a Peter Pan disk

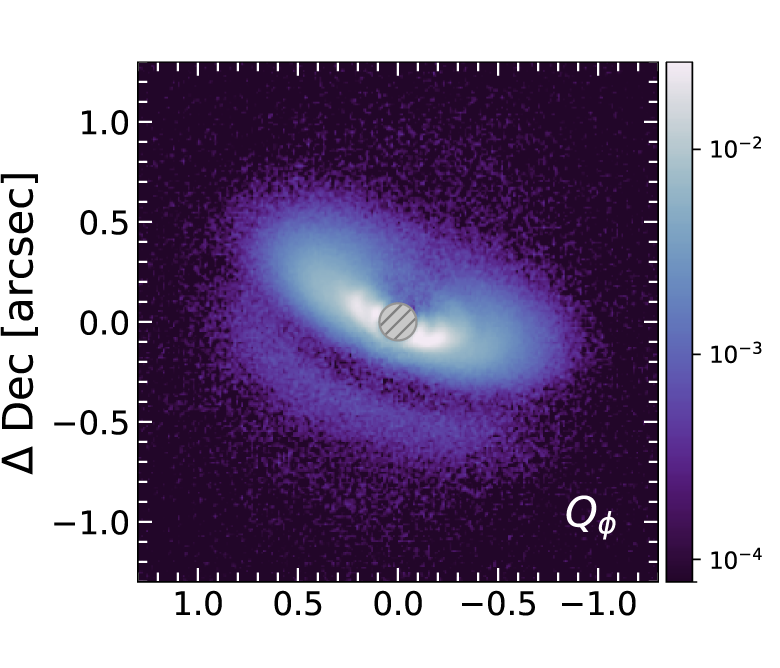
SPHERE image of the disk around PDS 111, which is a higher-mass analogue of a Peter Pan disk

The prototype Peter Pan disk is WISE J080822.18-644357.3. It was discovered by the NASA-led citizen science project Disk Detective.

Murphy et al. found additional Peter Pan disks in the literature, which were identified as part of the Columba and Tucana-Horologium associations. The Disk Detective Collaboration identified two additional Peter Pan disks in Columba and Carina associations. The paper also mentions that members of NGC 2547 were previously identified to have 22 μm excess and could be similar to Peter Pan disks. 2MASS 08093547-4913033, which is one of the M-dwarfs with a debris disk in NGC 2547 was observed with the Spitzer Infrared Spectrograph. In this system the first detection of silicate was made from a debris disk around an M-type star. While the system shows the H-alpha line, it was interpreted to be devoid of gas and non-accreting.

In the following years additional objects were discovered. Some objects do not exactly fit the definition of Peter Pan disks, but are similar enough to be analogs: The object 2MASS J06195260-2903592 was found to be a 31+22
−10 Myr old analog to Peter Pan disks. This object does however not show accretion. The star PDS 111 is interpreted as a higher-mass analog of Peter Pan disks, with an age of 15.9+1.7
−3.7 Myrs, a mass of 1.2±0.1 M_{☉}, active accretion and a directly imaged disk. One team also found old accreting stars in the Large Magellanic Cloud in the Tarantula Nebula. This might be explained with a low metallicity in the LMC, which can lead to more massive disks that are less opaque.

=== List of Peter Pan disk candidates ===
Note: Wang et al. 2025 lists 14 Peter Pan disks, here only 4 are listed that are older than 20 Myrs. Not included is US 3566 (Gaia DR3 155649614856576), which is a binary of a white dwarf and M-dwarf, which could be a cataclysmic variable. Not included are also 2MASS J04141188+2811535 and 2MASS J04091380+3136325, which could be Taurus members.

Name	Age (Myrs)	Association	spectral type	infrared excess	accretion	Reference
WISE J080822.18-644357.3	45+11 −7	Carina association	M5	yes	yes	
2MASS J05010082-4337102	42+6 −4	Columba association	M4.5	yes	yes	
2MASS J02265658-5327032	45±4	Tucana-Horologium association	L0δ	yes	yes	
WISEA J044634.16-262756.1	42+6 −4	Columba association (but might be χ^{1} Fornacis member, which is 34 Myr old)	M6+M6	yes	likely	
WISEA J094900.65-713803.1	45+11 −7	Carina association	M4+M5	yes	yes both	
2MASS J15460752-6258042	~55	Argus association (but might be Beta Pictoris member)	M5	yes	yes	
2MASS J05082729−2101444	30–44	Columba association (but could be Beta Pictoris member)	M5	yes	yes	
LDS 5606	30–44	Columba association (but could be Beta Pictoris member)	M5+M5	yes	yes	
Delorme 1 (AB)b	30–45	Tucana-Horologium association	L0 (very low gravity)	yes	yes	
2MASS J06320799-6810419	~45	Carina association	M4.5	yes	yes	
2MASS J19150079-2847587	24±3	Beta Pictoris moving group	M4.8 (binary candidate)	yes	yes	
StHα34	24.7+0.9 −0.6	Beta Pictoris moving group	M3+M3	yes	yes	
Gaia DR3 2162887638405193216	>50		K9.4	yes	yes	
CVSO 1241 (Gaia DR3 3223542525253775104)	25.1	Orion OB1? (would be 5–10 Myr)	M3.8	yes	yes	
2MASS J05171175+0702232 (Gaia DR3 3241216624914091136)	24.7	Lambda Orionis ring?	M3.2	yes	yes	
Gaia DR3 3319360599927089024	29.9		M3.6	yes	yes	

2MASS J0041353-562112 was discarded as it belongs to the Beta Pictoris moving group and does not show excess.

== Implications for planet formation around M-stars ==
There are different models to explain the existence of Peter Pan disks, such as disrupted planetesimals or recent collisions of planetary bodies. One explanation is that Peter Pan disks are long-lived primordial disks. This would follow the trend of lower-mass stars requiring more time to dissipate their disks. Exoplanets around M-stars would have more time to form, significantly affecting the atmospheres on these planets.

Peter Pan disks that form multiplanetary systems could force the planets in close-in, resonant orbits. The 7-planet system TRAPPIST-1 could be an end result of such a Peter Pan disk.

A Peter Pan disk could also help to explain the existence of Jovian planets around M-dwarfs, such as TOI-5205b. A longer lifetime for a disk would give more time for a solid core to form, which could initiate runaway core-accretion.

== See also ==
- WISE J080822.18-644357.3
- Disk Detective
- Circumstellar disk
- Protoplanetary disk
- Debris disk
- T Tauri star
- HD 74389
- AU Microscopii
- List of nearby stellar associations and moving groups
