= WISEA J044634.16-262756.1 =

Binary star in the constellation Eridanus

J0446
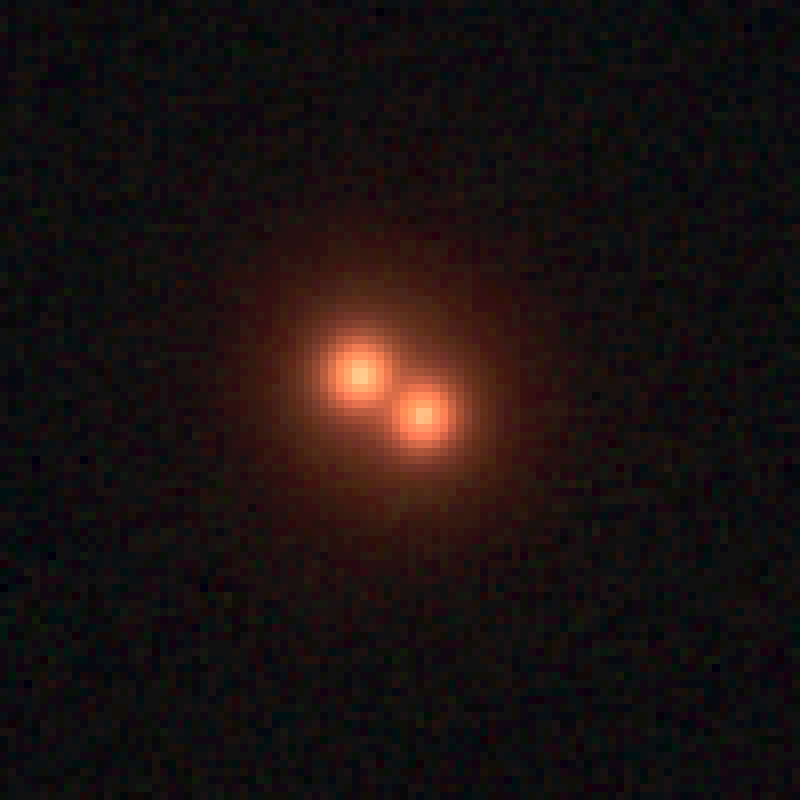
- The J0446AB binary Credit: PanSTARRS; Image Processing: Meli_thev

Observation data Epoch J2000 Equinox J2000
- Constellation: Eridanus
- J0446A
- Right ascension: 04^{h} 46^{m} 34.11^{s}
- Declination: −26° 27′ 56.8″
- J0446B
- Right ascension: 04^{h} 46^{m} 34.25^{s}
- Declination: −26° 27′ 55.6″

Characteristics
- Evolutionary stage: red dwarf
- Spectral type: M4.5+M6

Astrometry

J0446A
Radial velocity (R_{v})	26.7 ±16.8 km/s
Proper motion (μ)	RA: 33.351 ±0.084 mas/yr Dec.: −5.459 ±0.118 mas/yr
Parallax (π)	12.1093±0.0629 mas
Distance	269 ± 1 ly (82.6 ± 0.4 pc)

J0446B
Radial velocity (R_{v})	29.8 ±16.8 km/s
Proper motion (μ)	RA: 33.534 ±0.080 mas/yr Dec.: −3.629 ±0.112 mas/yr
Parallax (π)	12.1604±0.0594 mas
Distance	268 ± 1 ly (82.2 ± 0.4 pc)

Details

J0446A
Temperature	~3000 K
Age	33.7+2.0 −1.9 Myr

J0446B
Mass	0.13–0.22 M_{☉}
Luminosity	0.016 L_{☉}
Temperature	~3100 K
Age	33.7+2.0 −1.9 Myr

Position (relative to J0446A)
Component	J0446B
Angular distance	2.3″
Projected separation	189 AU

Other designations
- 2MASS J04463413-2627559, TIC 590241, WISEA J044634.16-262756.1, WISE J044634.16-262756.1
- J0446A: UCAC4 318-005949, Gaia DR2 4881308710764495744
- J0446B: UCAC4 318-005951, Gaia DR2 4881308710762664576

Database references

J0446 system
SIMBAD	data

J0446A
SIMBAD	data

J0446B
SIMBAD	data

WISEA J044634.16-262756.1 (also known as J0446) is a binary star system with one component having a long-lived primordial disk, also called a Peter Pan disk.

J0446 was first identified as an object with infrared excess and member of the 42 Myr old Columba association by the NASA citizen science project Disk Detective. The object was identified as a binary with both components having a spectral type of M6, making them red dwarfs. Both components were observed with Gemini south, detecting H-alpha emission for both components. The strength of the H-alpha line was in between stellar activity and accretion from a disk. The infrared excess from WISE did however clearly indicate the presence of a disk. Later an analysis found that J0446 belongs to the χ1 Fornacis moving group. This group is slightly younger with an age of 33.7+2.0
−1.9 Myr. PanSTARRS and Gaia show that the pair is separated by 2.3 arcseconds, or about 189 AU. The weaker H-alpha emission of J0446A is likely coming from chromospheric activity and not accretion. An analysis of the Gaia XP spectrum of J0446B found an earlier spectral type of M4.5. Stellar carbon monoxide and water absorption were detected with MIRI.

== Disk of J0446B ==
J0446B shows stronger and broader H-alpha emission, likely from weak accretion of 2.5 × 10^{−11}M_{☉}/yr. The disk was also detected with ALMA, which will be described in a future work. The dust mass was estimated to be 0.1 M_{🜨} from ALMA, which is quite low when compared to younger disks. A research team used JWST MIRI to observe J0446B. The researchers found a large number of molecules in the inner disk of this red dwarf. The researchers detected 9 hydrocarbons (methyl radical, methane, acetylene [C_{2}H_{2} and ^{13}CCH_{2}], ethylene, ethane, propyne, diacetylene, and benzene), two nitrogen-bearing species (hydrogen cyanide and cyanoacetylene), two isotopes of carbon dioxide (^{12}CO_{2} and ^{13}CO_{2}), molecular hydrogen and two noble gases (neon and argon). Weak emission of the water molecule is also present. Additionally the spectrum showed amorphous silicate (modelled with olivine) and crystalline silicate of forsterite. Molecular hydrogen and neon is usually only found in young disks with ages of a few million years. This indicates that the disk in J0446B contains primordial gas. Other works in the past tried to explain Peter Pan disks with other scenarios, such as the collision of planetesimals, but the presence of molecular hydrogen and neon excludes these scenarios for J0446B. The line strength of neon and argon indicate that the main ionizing source are soft x-ray and UV photons coming from J0446. The disk is very carbon-rich, which was also seen in other late M-dwarf disks with Spitzer and JWST. J0446B has the highest acetylene to water line ratio detected for an M-dwarf. Theories suggest that the inner disk will first become water-rich due to inwards drift of icy pebbles and then will become carbon-rich, as outer gas flows inwards. The carbon-rich inner disk of J0446B indicates that it represents the final stage of this evolution.

== Impact on planet formation ==
A long-lived disk can provide more time for planetary cores to form via the core-accretion process. Disk gas dampens orbital eccentricity and facilitates planet migration. This can result in compact planetary systems with resonant chains, such as the TRAPPIST-1 system. The high carbon content in the gaseous disk could lead to carbon-rich atmospheres. This could lead to hazes, such as seen in Titan or it could influence the mean molecular weight and thermal structure of such atmospheres. Because carbon is in the gas-phase, the solids should have relative little carbon. If carbon is lost in the gas-phase and terrestrial planets are assembled from solids at a late stage, these rocky planets would be carbon-poor.
