= Disk Detective =

NASA-citizen science project

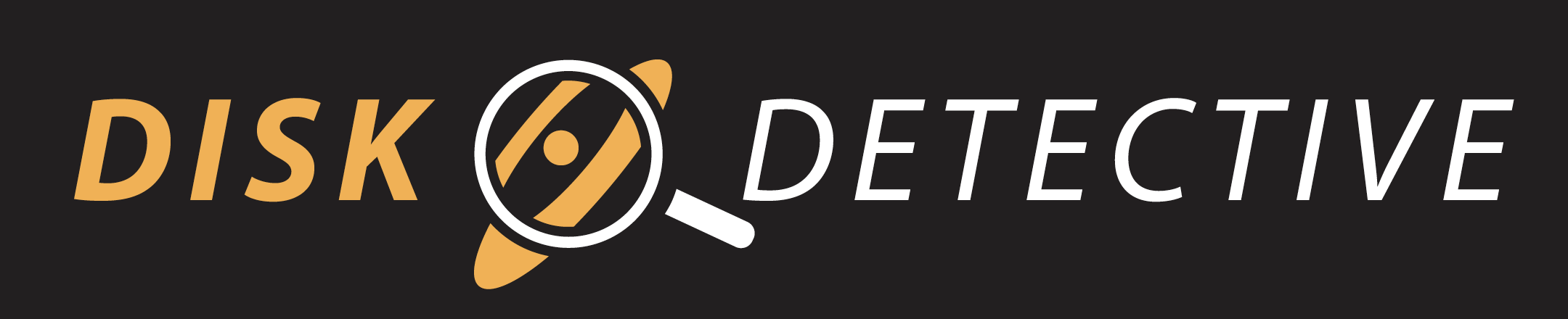

- Website type: Citizen science project
- Available in: English, Spanish, German, Polish, Chinese, Indonesian, Hungarian, Romanian, Russian, Portuguese
- Creator: Disk Detective Team
- Website: www.diskdetective.org
- Commercial: No
- Registration: Optional
- Launched: 31 January 2014; 12 years ago
- Current status: Online

Disk Detective is the first NASA-led and funded-collaboration project with Zooniverse. It is NASA's largest crowdsourcing citizen science project aiming at engaging the general public in search of stars, which are surrounded by dust-rich circumstellar disks, where planets usually dwell and are formed. Initially launched by NASA Citizen Science Officer, Marc Kuchner, the principal investigation of the project was turned over to Steven Silverberg.

== Details ==
Disk Detective was launched in January 2014, and was expected to continue until 2017. In April 2019 Disk Detective uploaded partly classified subjects, as Zooniverse did stop to support the old platform for projects, which was completed in May 2019. The project team began working on Disk Detective 2.0 that was then launched May 24, 2020, utilizing Zooniverse's new platform.

The project invites the public to search through images captured by NASA's Wide-field Infrared Survey Explorer (WISE) and other sky surveys. Disk Detective 1.0 compared images from the WISE mission to the Two Micron All Sky Survey (2MASS), the Digitized Sky Survey (DSS) and the Sloan Digital Sky Survey (SDSS). Version 2.0 compares WISE images to 2MASS, Panoramic Survey Telescope and Rapid Response System (Pan-STARRS), Australia's SkyMapper telescope, and the unblurred coadds of WISE imaging (unWISE).

The images in Disk Detective have all been pre-selected to be extra bright at wavelengths where circumstellar dust emits thermal radiation. They are at mid-infrared, near-infrared and optical wavelengths. Disks are not the only heavenly objects that appear bright at infrared wavelengths; active galactic nuclei, galaxies, asteroids and interstellar dust clouds also emit at these wavelengths. Computer algorithms cannot distinguish the difference, so it is necessary to examine all images by "eye" to make sure that the selected candidates are stars with disks, and not other celestial objects.

After the initial and subsequent discovery of several Peter Pan disks—M dwarf primordial gas-rich circumstellar disk systems that retain their gas 2 to 10 times longer than that of other disks—by the Disk Detective science team, research began to understand how these unusual systems fit into disk development. On September 29, 2022, NASA announced version 2.1 of the project, releasing new data containing thousands of images of nearby stars located in young star-forming regions and to provide a better view of "extreme" debris disks—circumstellar disks that have brighter than expected luminosity—in the galactic plane. The 2.1 dataset targets stars with brightness at a wavelength of 12 μm in an effort to discover more Peter Pan disks.

== Classification ==
At the Disk Detective website, the images are presented in animated forms which are called flip books. Each image of the flip book is formatted to focus on the subject of interest within a series of circles and crosshairs.

Website visitors—whether or not they are registered member users of Zooniverse—examine the flip book images and classify the target subjects based on simple criteria. Disk Detective 2.0 elimination criteria include whether the subject "moves" off the center crosshairs in 2MASS images only, if it moves off of crosshairs in two or more images, if the subject is not round in Pan-STARRS, SkyMapper, or 2MASS images, if it becomes extended beyond the outer circle in WISE images, and if two or more images show objects between the inner and outer circles. The ideal target is classified as a "good candidate," and is further vetted by the advanced research group into a list of "debris disk of interest" (DDOI) candidates. Particular interest is paid to good candidates that have two or more images where objects other than the subject are present within the inner circle only.

The selected disk candidates will eventually become the future targets for NASA's Hubble Space Telescope and its successor, the James Webb Space Telescope. They will also be the topic for future publications in scientific literature.

== Seeking objects ==
The disks that NASA's scientists at the Goddard Space Flight Center aim to find are debris disks, which are older than 5 million years; and young stellar object (YSO) disks, which are younger than 5 million years.

== Advanced user group ==
Volunteers who have registered as citizen scientists with Zooniverse can join an exclusive group on the Disk Detective project, called "advanced users" or "super users," after they have done 300 classifications. Advanced users might then further vet candidates marked as "good," compare candidate subjects with literature, or analyze follow-up data. This advanced user group is similar to other groups that have formed in citizen science projects, such as the Peas Corps in Galaxy Zoo.

== Discoveries ==
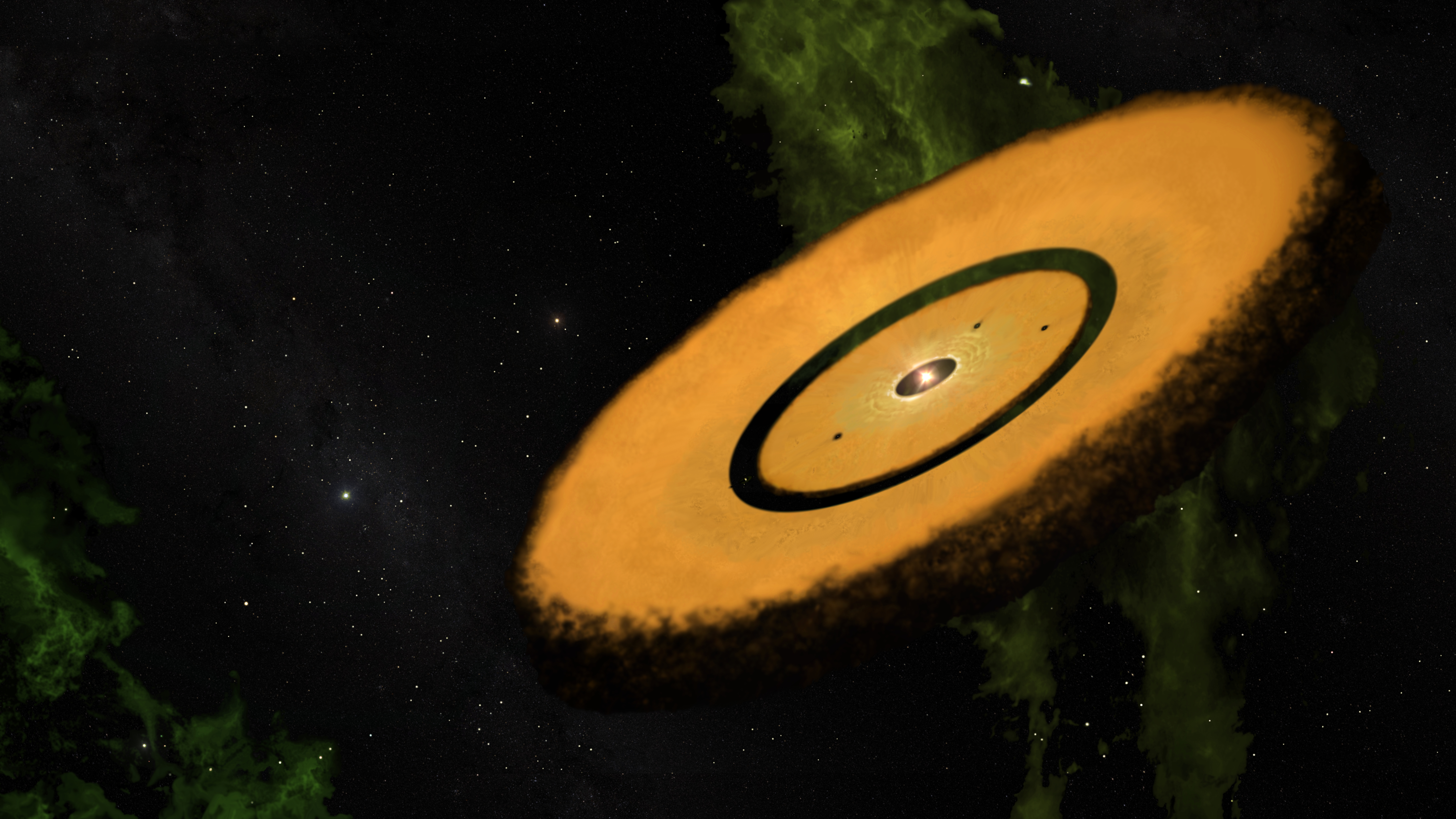
WISE J080822.18-644357.3, a ~45 Myr-old pre-transitional disk discovered by volunteers of Disk Detective

The Disk Detective project discovered the first example of a Peter Pan disk. At the 235th meeting of the American Astronomical Society the discovery of four new Peter Pan disks was presented. Three objects are high-probability members of the Columba and Carina stellar associations. The forth object has an intermediate likelihood of being part of a moving group. All four objects are young M dwarfs.

The project has also discovered the first debris disk with a white dwarf companion (HD 74389) and a new kind of M dwarf disk (WISE J080822.18-644357.3) in a moving group. The project found 37 new disks (including HD 74389) and four Be stars in the first paper and 213 newly-identified disk candidates in the third paper. Together with WISE J080822.18-644357.3, the Disk Detective project found 251 new disks or disk candidates. The third paper also found HD 150972 (WISEA J164540.79-310226.6) as a likely member of the Scorpius–Centaurus moving group, 12 candidates that are co-moving binaries and 31 that are closer than 125 parsec, making them possible targets for direct imaging of exoplanets.

Additionally, the project published the discovery a nearby young brown dwarf with a warm class-II type circumstellar disk, WISEA J120037.79−784508.3 (W1200−7845), located in the ε Chamaeleontis association. Found 102 parsecs (~333 lightyears) from the Sun, this puts it within the solar neighborhood, making it ideal for study since brown dwarfs are very faint due to their low masses of about 13-80 M_{J}. Therefore, it is within distance to observe greater details if viewed with large telescope arrays or space telescopes. W1200-7845 is also very young, with measurements putting it at about 3.7 million years old, meaning that—along with its relatively close proximity—it could serve as a benchmark for future studies of brown dwarf system formation.

A study with JWST MIRI found that the disk around WISEA J044634.16-262756.1B, which was first discovered by the Disk Detective project, has a carbon-rich disk. The study found clear evidence that the disk has long-lived primordial gas. 14 molecules were found within the disk, many of them being hydrocarbons.

== False positive rate and applications ==
The project did make estimates about the amount of high-quality disk candidates in AllWISE and lower-limit false-positive rates for several catalogs, based on classification false-positive rates, follow-up imaging and literature review. Out of the 149,273 subjects on the Disk Detective website 7.9±0.2% are likely candidates. 90.2% of the subjects are eliminated by website evaluation, 1.35% were eliminated by literature review and 0.52% were eliminated by high-resolution follow-up imaging (Robo-AO + Dupont/Retrocam). From this result AllWISE might contain ~21,600 high quality disk candidates and 4-8% of the disk candidates from high-quality surveys might show background objects in high-resolution images, which are bright enough to affect the infrared excess.

The project also has a database that is available through the Mikulski Archive for Space Telescopes (MAST). It contains the "goodFraction", describing how often a source was voted as a good source on the website, as well as other information about the source, such as comments from the science team, machine learned classification, cross-matched catalog information and SED fits.

A group at MIT did use the Disk Detective classifications to train a machine-learning system. They found that their machine-learning system agreed with user identifications of debris disks 97% of the time. The group has found 367 promising candidates for follow-up observations with this method.

== See also ==
- Exoplanet
- Kuiper belt
- Planetesimal
- Protoplanetary disk
- T Tauri star
- WISEA J120037.79-784508.3

Zooniverse projects:

- The Daily Minor Planet
- Asteroid Zoo
- Backyard Worlds: Planet 9
- Backyard Worlds
- Galaxy Zoo
- The Milky Way Project
- Old Weather
- Planet Hunters
- SETILive
