= WISEA J120037.79−784508.3 =

Brown dwarf in the constellation Chamaleon

- WISE bands W1-W4 showing infrared excess around W1200−7845, indicating a primordial disk.

Observation data Epoch J2000.0 Equinox J2000.0
- Constellation: Chamaeleon
- Right ascension: 12^{h} 00^{m} 37.712^{s}
- Declination: −78° 45′ 08.38″

Astrometry
| Proper motion (μ) | RA: –41.664 [0.080] mas/yr Dec.: –6.050 [0.074] mas/yr |
| Parallax (π) | 9.8383±0.0714 mas |
| Distance | 333.73 ± 3.13 ly (102.32 ± 0.96 pc) |

Details
| Mass | 42–58 M_{Jup} |
| Luminosity (bolometric) | 0.078 L_{☉} |
| Temperature | T_{eff, BD} = 2784–2850K: T_{eff,disk} = 521 K |
| Metallicity | 0.7998 Fe abundance (from GSP using BP/RP spectra) |
| Age | 3.7^{+4.6}_{−1.4} Myr |

Database references
| SIMBAD | data |

WISEA J120037.79−784508.3, also called W1200−7845 or 2MASS J12003792−7845082, is a brown dwarf with a primordial disk 333.73 ± 3.13 lightyears from Earth in the 3.7^{+4.6}_{−1.4} Myr-old ε Chamaeleontis (ε Cha) association, currently making it the closest known brown dwarf with an associated circumstellar disk. It was discovered by citizen scientists in 2020 volunteering for the Disk Detective project.

Disk Detective's science team then cross-matched W1200−7845 with BANYAN Σ, a Bayesian analysis tool used to estimate the likelihood that an object is a member of a young moving group based on its position, proper motion, parallax (using Gaia DR2 data, if available) and radial velocity. The analysis revealed (with 99.8% probability) that the brown dwarf was a member of the ε Cha young moving group association.

== Brown dwarf ==
The brown dwarf has a mass of about 42–58 M_{J} and has a spectral type of about M6.0γ. The gamma (γ) signifies the low surface gravity of the object, which is typical for young brown dwarfs. No accretion was detected from paschen and brackett spectral lines.

Later observations by Kubiak et al. 2021 found a strong H-alpha emission line, which indicates strong accretion of material. Named candidate #22 in their sample, it was the strongest accreting object in their entire sample.

== Disk ==
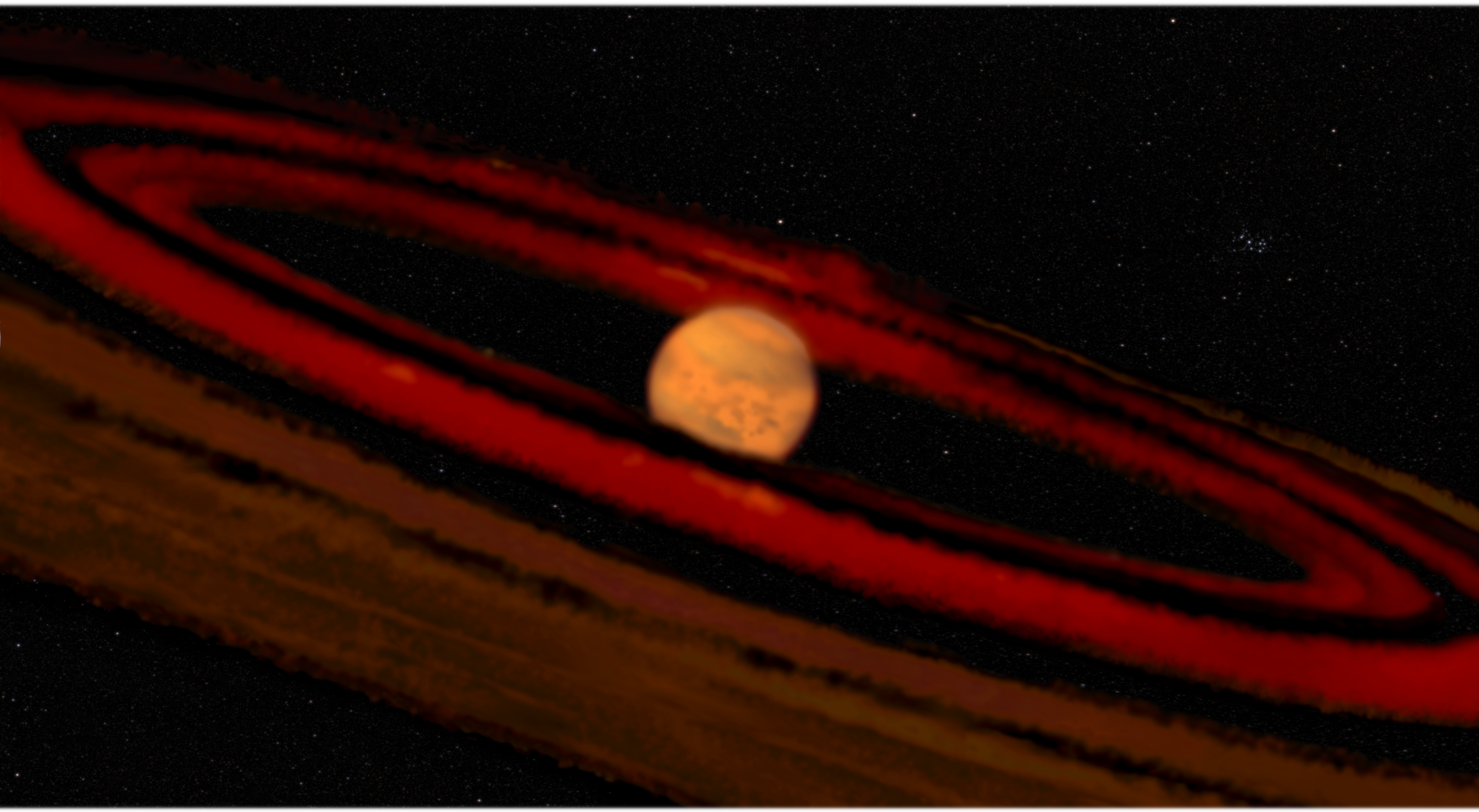
Artist's depiction of brown dwarf W1200−7845. Note that observations of the disk around W1200−7845 showed that it probably does not have a large gap close to the brown dwarf.

Three possible scenarios were considered for the disk: i) A blackbody disk (a disk with uniform temperature), ii) two blackbody disks (a disk with a gap) and iii) a power-law disk.

The blackbody disk model has a temperature of 516 K (243°C; 469°F). The two-blackbodies model compromises of an inner disk with a temperature of 730 K (457°C; 854°F) and an outer disk with a temperature of 230 K (–43°C; –46°F). The best-fit model is a power-law disk with a power-law slope of α = –0.94, which is consistent with a class II disk. The close proximity of this system to the Solar System makes this disk a good candidate to image the disk with ALMA.

== See also ==
- Backyard Worlds: Planet 9
- Cha 110913−773444
- 2MASS J04442713+2512164
- Goddard Space Flight Center
- Wide-field Infrared Survey Explorer
- WISEA 1101+5400
