= V1005 Orionis =

Young flame star in the constellation of Orion

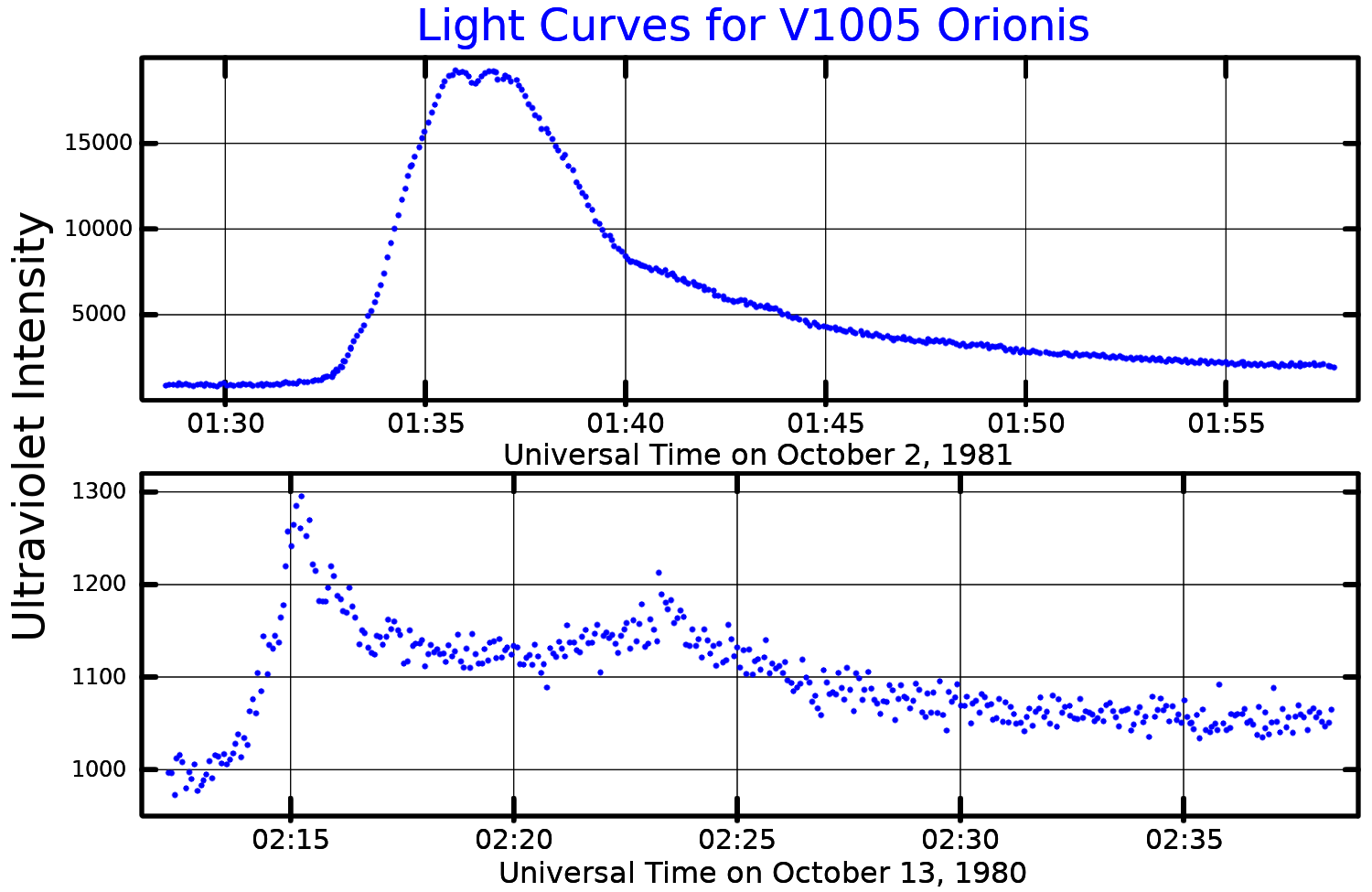
- Ultraviolet (U band) light curves for two flares on V1005 Orionis, adapted from Byrne et al. (1984)

Observation data Epoch J2000.0 Equinox J2000.0
- Constellation: Orion
- Right ascension: 04^{h} 59^{m} 34.834^{s}
- Declination: +01° 47′ 00.67″
- Apparent magnitude (V): 10.107±0.053 (9.96 to 10.17)

Characteristics
- Evolutionary stage: main sequence
- Spectral type: M0Ve
- B−V color index: 1.394±0.020
- Variable type: BY Dra, UV Cet

Astrometry
Radial velocity (R_{v})	19.16±0.0058 km/s
Proper motion (μ)	RA: 39.130 mas/yr Dec.: −94.900 mas/yr
Parallax (π)	40.9899±0.0128 mas
Distance	79.57 ± 0.02 ly (24.396 ± 0.008 pc)
Absolute magnitude (M_{V})	7.96

Details
Mass	0.75±0.01 M_{☉}
Radius	0.74±0.02 R_{☉}
Luminosity	0.12 L_{☉}
Luminosity (bolometric)	0.14±0.01 L_{☉}
Surface gravity (log g)	4.5 cgs
Temperature	3,843±60 K
Metallicity [Fe/H]	0.14±0.11 dex
Rotation	4.4236±0.001 d
Rotational velocity (v sin i)	8.7±1.6 km/s
Age	25 Myr

Other designations
- V1005 Ori, GJ 182, HIP 23200

Database references
SIMBAD	data

V1005 Orionis is a young flare star in the equatorial constellation of Orion. It has the identifier GJ 182 in the Gliese–Jahreiß catalogue; V1005 Ori is its variable star designation. This star is too faint to be visible to the naked eye, having a mean apparent visual magnitude of 10.1. It is located at a distance of 79.6 light years from the Sun and is drifting further away with a radial velocity of 19.2 km/s. The star is a possible member of the IC 2391 supercluster.

Flare activity was first reported for this star by N. I. Shakhovskaya in 1974. B. W. Bopp found anomalously strong lithium lines in the spectrum of GJ 182, a rarity for stars of this class and a possible indicator of a very young star. Together with F. Espenak, in 1977 Bopp demonstrated the star showed periodic variations similar to BY Draconis. In 1984, Byrne and associates found a preliminary rotation period of 4.55 days and showed the star had a normal flare rate.

The stellar classification of V1005 Ori is M0Ve, indicating this is an M-type main-sequence star (a "red dwarf") with emission lines (e) in its spectrum. It is classified as a BY Draconis and UV Ceti variable, which means it is a magnetically active star that exhibits rotational modulation of star spots and undergoes sudden increases in brightness from flares. Because of this activity, the star displays a low level of X-ray emission. The surface magnetic field strength is 2.6±0.6 kG and the magnetic field has multiple poles. It shows a possible activity cycle with a period of 38 years and an amplitude of 0.13 in magnitude.

This star is an estimated 25 million years old and is currently about a half magnitude above the main sequence. However, the high lithium content suggests it may be as young as 10–15 million years, as this element is typically expected to be depleted after 20 million years. It is spinning with a projected rotational velocity of ~9 km/s, and a rotation period of 4.4 days suggests it is being viewed from close to the equatorial plane. The star has less mass, a smaller radius, and a lower luminosity compared to the Sun.

V1005 Ori is surrounded by a circumstellar disk of dust that indicates planetary formation is under way. This disk has a radius of 60 AU, a mean temperature of 27 K, and a dust mass equal to 3.35 times the mass of the Moon. A candidate sub-stellar companion was identified in 2001, but this was determined to be a background object.
