= HD 135344 =

Young star system in the constellation of Lupus

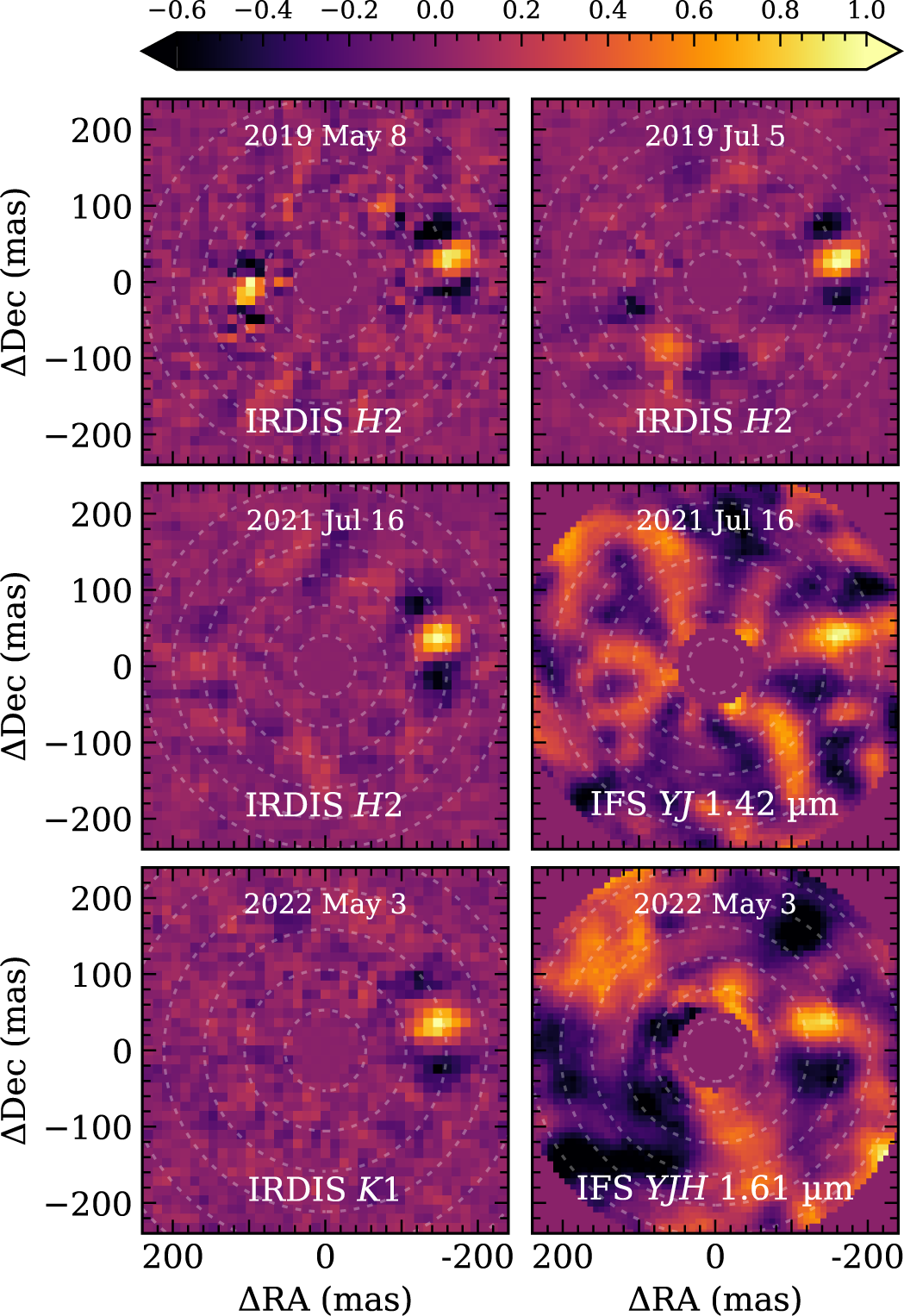
- The orbit of HD 135344 Ab around HD 135344 A (blocked by a coronagraph); Credit: Stolker et al

Observation data Epoch J2000 Equinox ICRS
- Constellation: Lupus
- A
- Right ascension: 15^{h} 15^{m} 48.9463^{s}
- Declination: −37° 08′ 55.731″
- Apparent magnitude (V): 7.76
- B
- Right ascension: 15^{h} 15^{m} 48.4460^{s}
- Declination: −37° 09′ 16.024″
- Apparent magnitude (V): 8.708

Characteristics

A
- Evolutionary stage: main sequence
- Spectral type: A0V

B
- Evolutionary stage: main sequence
- Spectral type: F8V

Astrometry

A
Radial velocity (R_{v})	29.31±3.29 km/s
Proper motion (μ)	RA: −18.738 mas/yr Dec.: −24.008 mas/yr
Parallax (π)	7.4105±0.0403 mas
Distance	440 ± 2 ly (134.9 ± 0.7 pc)

B
Radial velocity (R_{v})	−5.34±1.48 km/s
Proper motion (μ)	RA: −19.210 mas/yr Dec.: −23.268 mas/yr
Parallax (π)	7.4074±0.0240 mas
Distance	440 ± 1 ly (135.0 ± 0.4 pc)

Details

A
Mass	2.32 M_{☉}
Radius	1.50±0.01 R_{☉}
Luminosity	16.6±0.4 L_{☉}
Surface gravity (log g)	4.1±0.1 cgs
Temperature	9540±100 K
Metallicity [Fe/H]	0.10 dex

B
Mass	1.46+0.07 −0.04 M_{☉}
Radius	1.86 ± 0.08 (Note: Calculated, using the Stefan-Boltzmann law and the star's effective temperature and luminosity, with respect to the solar nominal effective temperature of 5,772 K: $$\sqrt{\biggl(\frac{5,772}{6,375}\biggr)^4 \cdot 10^{0.71}} = 1.86\ R_\odot.$$) R_{☉}
Luminosity	5.13±0.12 L_{☉}
Surface gravity (log g)	4.15±0.05 cgs
Temperature	6,375±125 K
Metallicity [Fe/H]	+0.00±0.13 dex
Rotation	0.25±0.03 days
Rotational velocity (v sin i)	70±4 km/s
Age	10.48+0.97 −0.49 Myr

Other designations
- CD−36 10010, HD 135344
- A: CPD−36 6758, SAO 206463, TYC 7324-1671-1
- B: CPD−36 6759, SAO 206462, TYC 7324-1676-1

Database references
SIMBAD	A
- B

HD 135344 is a young binary star system about 440 light-years away from Earth in the constellation Lupus. The primary star hosts a directly imaged gas giant planet, while the secondary star, also known as SAO 206462, is surrounded by a circumstellar disk of gas with clearly defined spiral arms and has three planet candidates.

== HD 135344 A ==
HD 135344 A is an A-type main-sequence star. It hosts a directly imaged gas giant planet, about 10 times the mass of Jupiter, discovered in 2025 with VLT/SPHERE.

The HD 135344 A planetary system
Companion (in order from star)	Mass	Semimajor axis (AU)	Orbital period (years)	Eccentricity	Inclination (°)	Radius
b	10.0+1.4 −1.9 M_{J}	16.5+2.8 −2.0	—	0.5±0.2	73.6+2.8 −4.7	1.45+0.06 −0.03 – 1.60+0.07 −0.06 R_{J}

== HD 135344 B ==
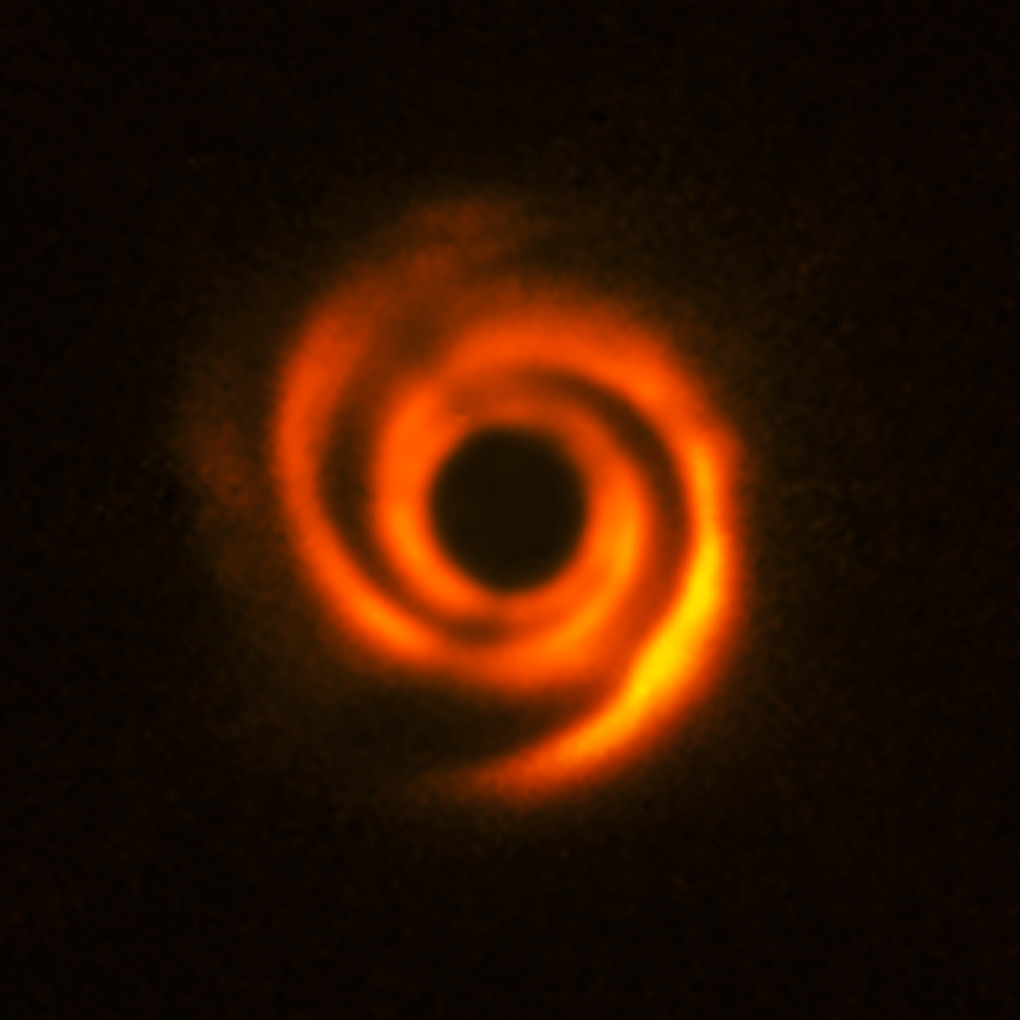
The disk around HD 135344B (SAO 206462) imaged by VLT/SPHERE

HD 135344 B, also known as SAO 206462, has been known to have a circumstellar disk since the 1990s, first detected based on an infrared excess. Observations of the structure of the disk were presented in July 2009 by Carol Grady, astronomer of Eureka Scientific, headquartered in the Goddard Space Flight Center at NASA. It was the first of this class that exhibited a high degree of clarity and was observed using several space telescopes (Hubble, FUSE, Spitzer) and ground-based telescopes (Gemini Observatory and Subaru Telescope, situated in Hawaii), through an international research program of young stars and of stars with planets. A number of astronomers of different observatories collaborated. The disk's diameter is about twice the size of the orbit of Pluto.

=== Evidence of planets ===
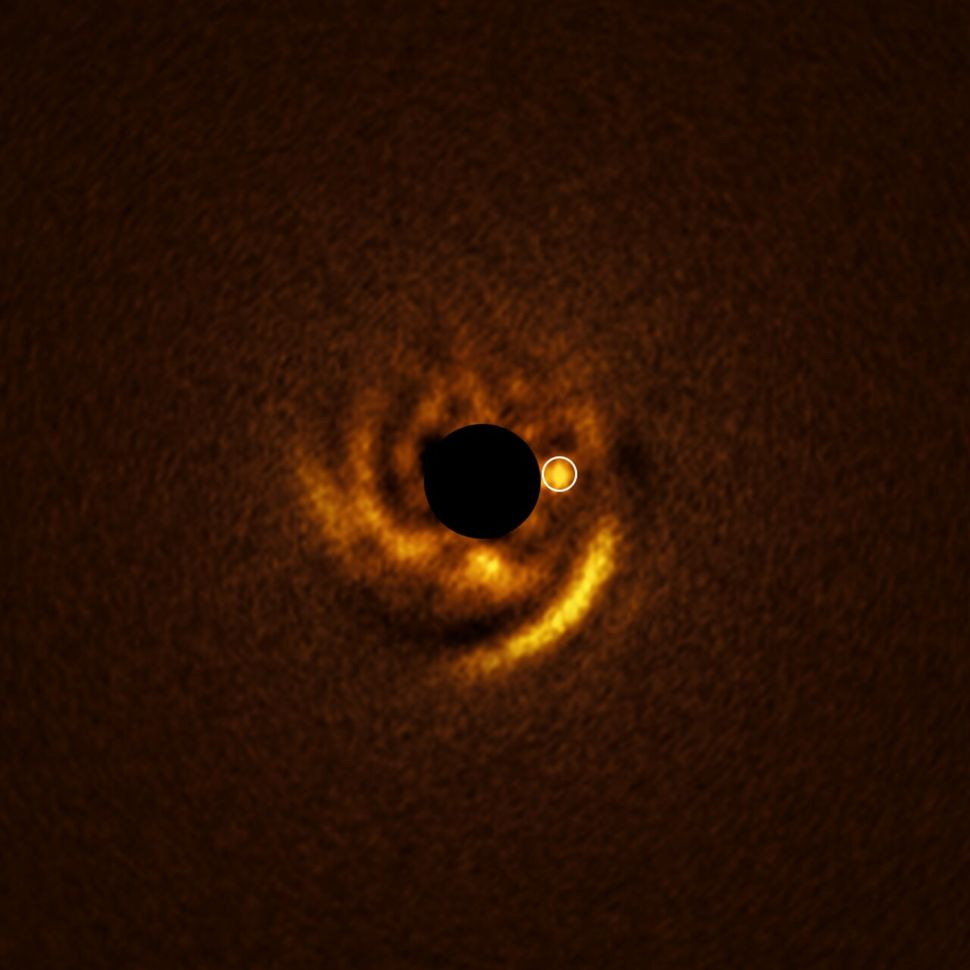
The protoplanetary disk of HD 135344B as seen by the ERIS instrument of the VLT with the position of a potential forming exoplanet indicated

The HD 135344 B (SAO 206462) planetary system
Companion (in order from star)	Mass	Semimajor axis (AU)	Orbital period (years)	Eccentricity	Inclination (°)	Radius
b (disputed)	2 M_{J}	28	—	—	—	2 R_{J}
(unconfirmed)	—	69±4	424±25	—	—	—
CC1 (unconfirmed)	0.8±0.3 M_{J}	300.8+9.9 −9.5	—	—	—	<1 R_{J}

The pair of spiral arms around SAO 206462 have a rotation rate of −0.85 degrees per year, which are thought to be caused by a dynamically driving protoplanet within the disk, at a distance of 66±3 astronomical units and an orbital period of 424±25 years. This planet should be a challenge to be detected using direct imaging due to the presence of dust particles obscuring it, but could be detected and confirmed via high-resolution spectroscopic observations. One 2026 study refined the rotation rate to −0.81±0.05 °/yr and provided new evidence supporting the existence of the planet.

Another planet candidate around SAO 206462 has been detected using observations of the JWST's NIRCam imaging instrument, with low signal-to-noise ratio, a mass of 0.8±0.3 M_{J} and a separation of 300 astronomical units. It has been dubbed CC1 (Companion candidate 1). Objects more massive than 2.2 M_{J} at distances of up to 120 AU have been ruled out by the observations.

A third planet candidate was detected by direct imaging in 2025, at the root of one of the disk's spiral arms. The object has a mass estimated at 2 M_{J}, and is highly embedded in gas and dust, possibly having its own protoplanetary disk. It has a separation of 28 AU from the host star and is likely shepherding the inner part of the disk. This exoplanet has been disputed in 2026, attributed to an artifact in the data processing.
