= 2MASS J04442713+2512164 =

Young brown dwarf with a protoplanetary disk

2M0444
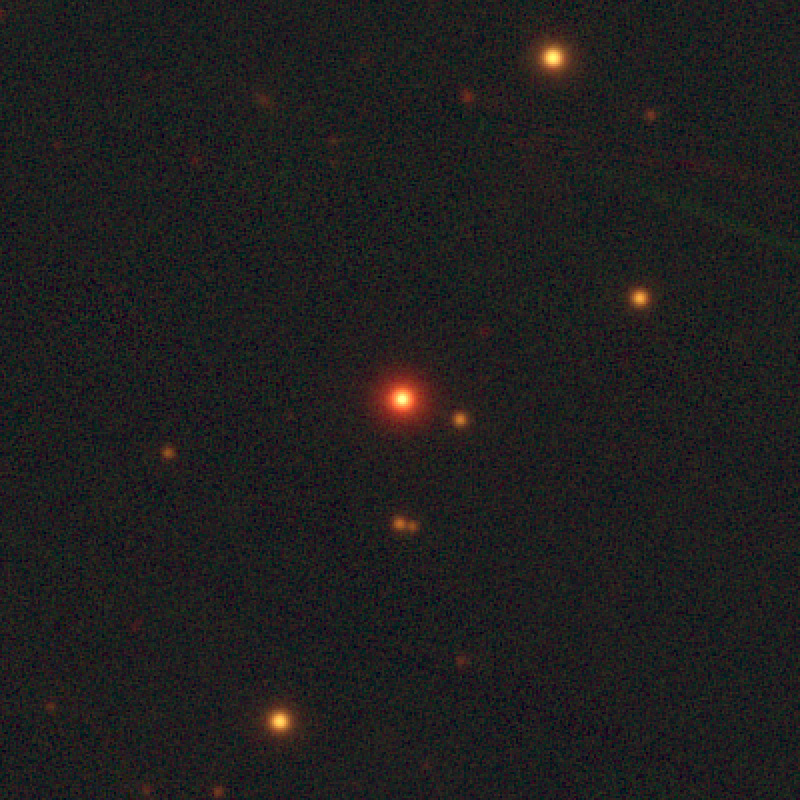
- 2M0444 is the bright red "star" in the center of this PanSTARRS image.

Observation data Epoch J2000 Equinox J2000
- Constellation: Taurus
- Right ascension: 04^{h} 44^{m} 27.143^{s}
- Declination: +25° 12′ 16.44″
- Apparent magnitude (V): 17.65±0.38

Characteristics
- Evolutionary stage: brown dwarf
- Spectral type: M7.25e±0.25

Astrometry
| Proper motion (μ) | RA: +5.760±0.067 mas/yr Dec.: −19.848±0.045 mas/yr |
| Parallax (π) | 6.9855±0.0603 mas |
| Distance | 467 ± 4 ly (143 ± 1 pc) |

Details
| Mass | 0.045 M_{☉}, 0.043–0.092 M_{☉} |
| Mass | 47 M_{J}, 45–96 M_{Jup} |
| Luminosity (bolometric) | 0.028 L_{☉} |
| Temperature | 2838 K |
| Rotation | 4.4300 days |
| Rotational velocity (v sin i) | 12±2 km/s |
| Age | 1 Myr |

Other designations
- IRAS 04414+2506, IRAS S04414+2506, 2MASS J04442713+2512164, EPIC 247915927, SSTtau 044427.1+251216, TIC 125977598, UGCS J044427.14+251216.3, WISE J044427.14+251216.3, Gaia DR2 147441558642852736

Database references
| SIMBAD | data |

2MASS J04442713+2512164 (2M0444, IRAS 04414+2506) is a brown dwarf in the Taurus Molecular Cloud. It is surrounded by a protoplanetary disk, which is resolved by multiple observatories. It is one of the brightest brown dwarf disks in millimeter wavelengths.

IRAS 04414+2506 was first identified as a good pre-main sequence star with IRAS in 1994, resembling a class II disk. In 2004 it was identified as the 2MASS source J04442713+2512164 and identified as a brown dwarf as part of the Taurus Cloud for the first time by Kevin Luhman.

== The brown dwarf ==
The brown dwarf was identified as having a spectral type of M7.25 with the MMT Observatory and the spectrum showed emission lines of H-alpha, oxygen and sulfur. The oxygen and sulfur emission lines are associated with class I objects, Herbig-Haro objects and some T Tauri stars. A detailed first study was published in 2008. This work identified additional emission lines with spectra from the Keck Observatory and Calar Alto Observatory. These are emissions by calcium and nitrogen. The H-alpha line has a broad and asymmetric profile, indicating that gas moves with different velocities around the brown dwarf. The emission lines show that the brown dwarf is accreting material intensely, powering an outflow and astrophysical jet. The mass of the brown dwarf was estimated to be 0.045 M_{☉} (47 M_{J}) for an age of 5 million years. The mass of the brown dwarf was directly measured using the rotation of the gas disk. A mass of 0.043–0.092 M_{☉} (45–96 M_{J}) was measured.

== The protoplanetary disk ==
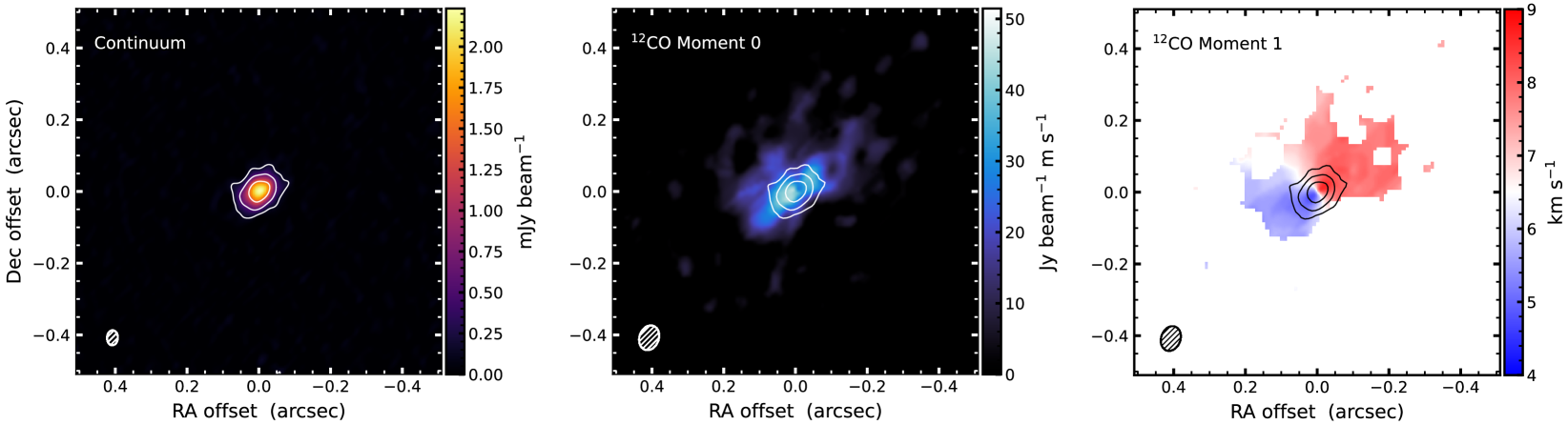
Resolved image of the disk with ALMA. The left image shows the dust. The middle and the right image show CO, with the image on the right showing the velocity of the disk, displaying the rotation of the disk.

Spitzer spectroscopy showed silicate dust grains with sizes of less than a few microns. The crystalline minerals forsterite and enstatite were identified from emission. Most of the dust mass of the disk is stored in grains larger than 1 mm. The disk was first resolved with the CARMA array. Published in 2013, 2M0444 was the first brown dwarf disk that was resolved in thermal emission. The disk radius was determined to be at least 15–30 AU. The observation also found evidence for dust grains larger than 1 mm, which is seen as evidence for dust grain growth. The disk was later also resolved with the Very Large Array (VLA). The observations also detected ionized gas emission from the disk at 1.36 cm.

The disk was first observed with ALMA in 2014, which detected rotational carbon monoxide (CO) emission from the disk. This observation determined an outer disk radius of 139+20
−27 AU and a total disk mass of 1.3±0.2 M_{J}. In 2025 additional high-resolution ALMA observations were published. These have the highest resolution for this disk, with a resolution of 0.046″ (or about 6.4 AU). The CO emission was detected to be rotating around the brown dwarf, a phenomenon also called a Keplerian disk. Researchers tentatively detected a gap at about 13.7 AU, with a width of 2.8 AU. The gap would be adjacent to a ring at around 16.2 AU. The gap was first suspected to exist in 2019 from the spectral energy distribution better fitting a disk with a gap, but this gap was suspected to be between 0.02 and 0.27 AU. This study found a higher disk mass of 2.05 M_{J}, which is enough to form Earth-mass planets.

=== Possible planet ===
The detection of the tentative gap could be explained with a planet that is carving the gap at 13.7 AU. This planet would have a mass of 0.3 to 7.7 M_{🜨} (between sub-Earth and super-Earth).

The 2M0444 planetary system
| Companion (in order from star) | Mass | Semimajor axis (AU) | Orbital period (years) | Eccentricity | Inclination (°) | Radius |
|---|---|---|---|---|---|---|
| gap (from SED fitting) | 0.02–0.27 AU | | | | — | — |
| gap (from ALMA) | 12.3–15.1 AU | | | | — | — |
| b (unconfirmed) | 0.3–7.7 M_{🜨} | 13.7 | — | — | — | — |
| ring (from ALMA) | 16.2 AU | | | | 49.9±0.5° | — |
| outer edge (CO map) | <56 AU | | | | — | — |

== See also ==
- List of resolved circumstellar disks
- WISEA J120037.79-784508.3 is the closest brown dwarf surrounded by a disk
- KPNO-Tau 12 is another brown dwarf in Taurus, also surrounded by a disk
