= HD 32309 =

Star in the constellation Lepus

- Location of HD 32309 (circled in red)

Observation data Epoch J2000 Equinox ICRS
- Constellation: Lepus
- Right ascension: 05^{h} 01^{m} 25.58117^{s}
- Declination: −20° 03′ 06.9054″
- Apparent magnitude (V): 4.91

Characteristics
- Evolutionary stage: main sequence
- Spectral type: B9V
- B−V color index: −0.047±0.002

Astrometry
Radial velocity (R_{v})	+24.2±2.8 km/s
Proper motion (μ)	RA: +36.377 mas/yr Dec.: −15.600 mas/yr
Parallax (π)	16.5337±0.1691 mas
Distance	197 ± 2 ly (60.5 ± 0.6 pc)
Absolute magnitude (M_{V})	1.00

Details
Mass	2.56±0.02 or 3.24 M_{☉}
Radius	3.1 R_{☉}
Luminosity	46.5 L_{☉}
Surface gravity (log g)	4.27±0.14 cgs
Temperature	12,450±423 K
Rotational velocity (v sin i)	293 or 302 km/s
Age	124 Myr

Other designations
- BD−20°990, HD 32309, HIP 23362, HR 1621, SAO 169981

Database references
SIMBAD	data

HD 32309 is a single star in the southern constellation of Lepus. It has a blue-white hue and is visible to the naked eye with an apparent visual magnitude of 4.91. The distance to this object is 197 light years based on parallax. It is drifting further away from the Sun with a radial velocity of +24 km/s. This is a member of the Columba association of co-moving stars.

This is a B-type main-sequence star with a stellar classification of B9V. It is around 124 million years old and is spinning rapidly with a projected rotational velocity of about 300 km/s. Mass estimates range from 2.56 to 3.24 times the mass of the Sun and it has about 3.1 times the Sun's radius. The star is radiating 46.5 times the luminosity of the Sun from its photosphere at an effective temperature of 12,450 K.
