= HD 141943 =

Young Sun-like star with a circumstellar disk

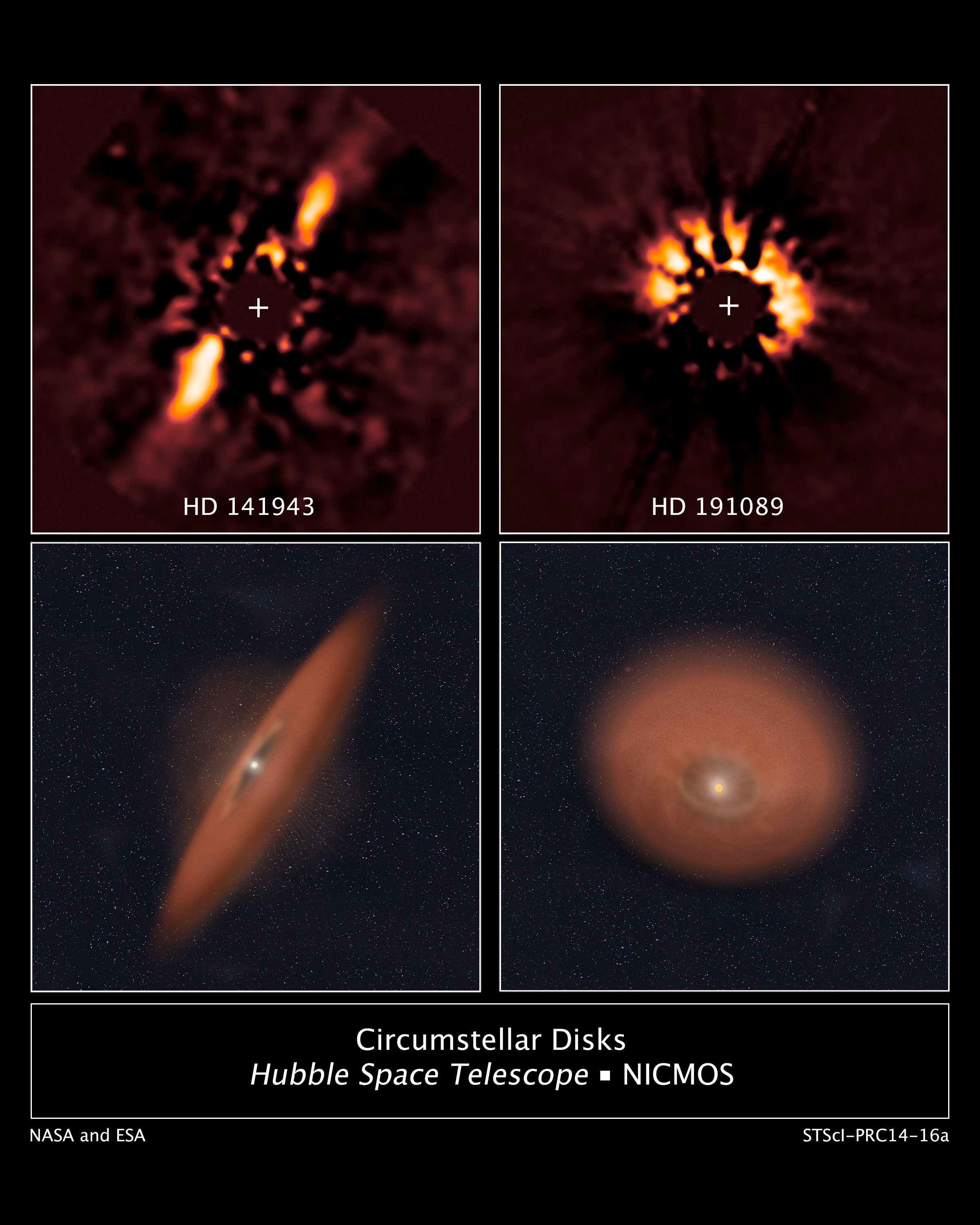
- Image (top) and artistic illustration (bottom) of HD 141943, the two images on the left

Observation data Epoch J2000.0 Equinox J2000.0
- Constellation: Lupus
- Right ascension: 15^{h} 53^{m} 27.29^{s}
- Declination: −42° 16′ 00.7″
- Apparent magnitude (V): 7.98

Characteristics
- Evolutionary stage: PMS
- Spectral type: G2

Astrometry
Proper motion (μ)	RA: −43.236 mas/yr Dec.: −65.588 mas/yr
Parallax (π)	16.6271±0.0221 mas
Distance	196.2 ± 0.3 ly (60.14 ± 0.08 pc)

Details
Mass	1.09 M_{☉}
Radius	1.35 R_{☉}
Luminosity	2.07 L_{☉}
Surface gravity (log g)	4.22 cgs
Temperature	5,963 K
Rotation	2.2 days
Rotational velocity (v sin i)	24.4 km/s
Age	30 Myr

Other designations
- NZ Lup, NSV 20423, CD−41 10403, CPD−41 7375, HD 141943, SAO 226339, PPM 321158, TYC 7846-1538-1

Database references
SIMBAD	data

HD 141943 is a young pre-main sequence G-type star with a circumstellar disk. Due to the similarity between HD 141943 and the Sun (Sun-like), it resembles what the Sun would have looked like during the epoch of terrestrial planet formation in Solar System history. Reconstruction of brightness maps of HD 141943 reveal a weak polar spot that changed little in latitude over the 4 year period in which it was observed. It also revealed significant amounts of low latitude features on HD 141943.

It is a potential excellent candidate for telescopes such as the Hubble Space Telescope (HST), the Gemini Planet Imager (GPI) and the Very-Large Telescope (VLT) for follow-up observations of possible planet formation around HD 141943.

== Magnetic field ==
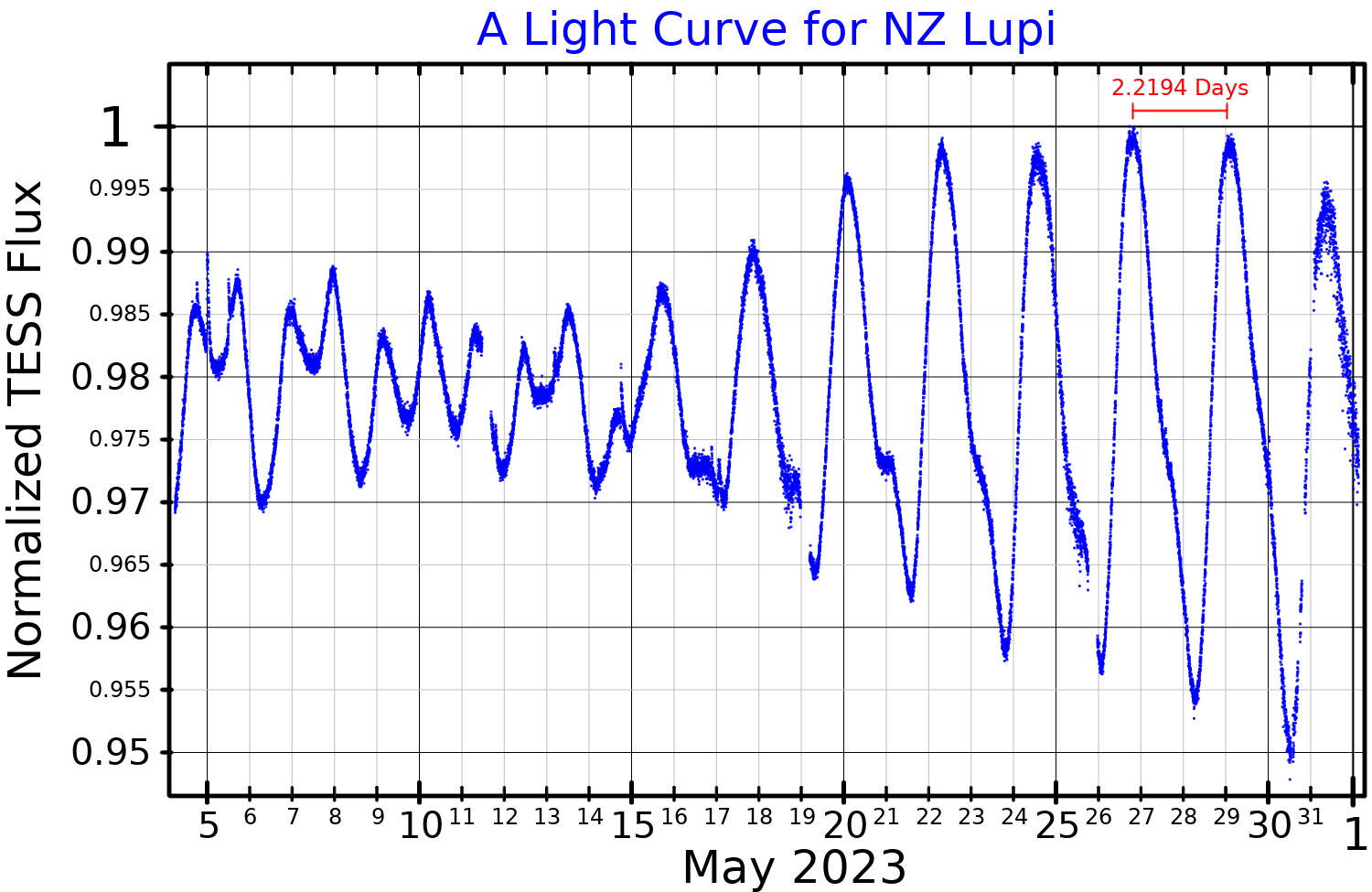
A light curve for NZ Lupi, plotted from TESS data. The 2.2194 day period is marked in red.

The coronal magnetic field of HD 141943 is dominated by a dipole which shows evidence of a possible tilt. The star also has a high differential rotation, about 8 times the value of the magnetic features of the Sun and 5 times the brightness features. This makes it similar to K-type stars.
