= Chi1 Fornacis =

Star in the constellation Fornax

χ^{1} Fornacis
- Location of χ^{1} Fornacis (circled)

Observation data Epoch J2000.0 Equinox J2000.0 (ICRS)
- Constellation: Fornax
- Right ascension: 03^{h} 25^{m} 55.84196^{s}
- Declination: −35° 55′ 15.1876″
- Apparent magnitude (V): 6.39±0.01

Characteristics
- Evolutionary stage: main sequence star
- Spectral type: A1 IV
- B−V color index: +0.08

Astrometry
Radial velocity (R_{v})	19.0±0.5 km/s
Proper motion (μ)	RA: +36.770 mas/yr Dec.: −4.641 mas/yr
Parallax (π)	9.6154±0.0266 mas
Distance	339.2 ± 0.9 ly (104.0 ± 0.3 pc)
Absolute magnitude (M_{V})	+1.42

Details
Mass	2.05±0.08 M_{☉}
Radius	2.20±0.11 R_{☉}
Luminosity	31.24^{+3.43}_{−3.09} L_{☉}
Surface gravity (log g)	4.08±0.07 cgs
Temperature	8,770^{+122}_{−120} K
Metallicity [Fe/H]	0.00^{+0.02}_{−0.04} dex
Rotational velocity (v sin i)	136 km/s
Age	5.5±0.5 Myr

Other designations
- χ^{1} For, 89 G. Fornacis, NSV 1162, CD−36°1290, CPD−36°350, GC 4097, HD 21573, HIP 15987, HR 1042, SAO 194289

Database references
SIMBAD	For data

Chi^{1} Fornacis, Latinised from χ^{1} Fornacis is a solitary white-hued star located in the southern constellation Fornax. It is barely visible to the naked eye with an apparent magnitude of 6.39, which is near the limit for naked eye visibility. Gaia DR3 parallax measurements imply a distance of 339 light-years and it is currently drifting away with a heliocentric radial velocity of 19.0 km/s. At its current distance, Chi^{1} Fornacis' brightness is diminished by an interstellar extinction of 0.08 magnitudes and it has an absolute magnitude of +1.42.

Chi^{1} Fornacis has a stellar classification of A1 IV, indicating that it is a slightly evolved A-type star that is ceasing hydrogen fusion at its core. Alternatively, it has been given a class of A1 Vbn, indicating that it is instead a slightly less luminous A-type main-sequence star with broad or nebulous absorption lines due to rapid rotation. It has 2.05 times the mass of the Sun and 2.20 times the radius of the Sun. It radiates 31.24 times the luminosity of the Sun from its photosphere at an effective temperature of 8,870 K. Chi^{1} Fornacis has a solar metallicity and it is estimated to be only 5.5 million years old. It spins rapidly with a projected rotational velocity of 136 km/s.

It is the brightest star and titular member in the χ^{1} Fornacis cluster, a star cluster around 104 parsecs from Earth.

== χ^{1} Fornacis cluster ==
The χ^{1} Fornacis cluster, or Alessi 13, is one of the four star clusters known within 110 parsecs from Earth. Despite its closeness, the χ^{1} Fornacis cluster has barely been studied. Its age is 40 million years and its distance is 104 parsecs. The χ^{1} Fornacis cluster appears to be closely related to the Tucana–Horologium and Columba associations. A remarkable, unprecedented aspect of the cluster is the large percentage of M-type stars with warm excess infrared emission due to orbiting dust grains.
