= HD 74389 =

Double star system in the constellation Ursa Major

Observation data Epoch J2000.0 Equinox ICRS
- Constellation: Ursa Major
- HD 74389 A
- Right ascension: 08^{h} 45^{m} 46.92304^{s}
- Declination: +48° 52′ 43.5507″
- Apparent magnitude (V): 7.48
- HD 74389 B
- Right ascension: 08^{h} 45^{m} 46.92304^{s}
- Declination: +48° 52′ 43.5507″
- Apparent magnitude (V): 14.62

Characteristics
- Spectral type: A2V + DA1.3 + M?
- U−B color index: +0.05
- B−V color index: +0.07

Astrometry

HD 74389 A
Radial velocity (R_{v})	−15.4 km/s
Proper motion (μ)	RA: −2.097±0.096 mas/yr Dec.: 8.067±0.076 mas/yr
Parallax (π)	7.6401±0.0633 mas
Distance	427 ± 4 ly (131 ± 1 pc)
Absolute magnitude (M_{V})	1.2

HD 74389 B
Proper motion (μ)	RA: −1.437±0.089 mas/yr Dec.: 7.605±0.075 mas/yr
Parallax (π)	7.6689±0.0729 mas
Distance	425 ± 4 ly (130 ± 1 pc)
Absolute magnitude (M_{V})	9.4

Orbit
Period (P)	80,000 yr
Semi-major axis (a)	2488.5 AU

Details

A
Mass	1.71 M_{☉}
Luminosity	9.71 L_{☉}
Temperature	8.200 K

B
Mass	0.69 M_{☉}
Radius	0.015 R_{☉}
Luminosity	0.4 L_{☉}
Surface gravity (log g)	7.85 cgs
Temperature	39,500 K

Other designations
- BD+49°1766, HIP 42994, TYC 3420-1971-1, GSC 03420-01971, 2MASS J08454693+4852435

Database references
SIMBAD	data

HD 74389 is a double star system approximately 425 light years from Earth. The primary, HD 74389 A, was initially listed in the Hipparcos catalog as an A0V spectral type star, but this was subsequently updated in 1990 as A2V when Sanduleak and Pesch imaged it with the Burrell Schmidt telescope at Kitt Peak.

The primary component is a white A-type main sequence star with an apparent magnitude of +7.48. Its furthest companion, HD 74389 B, is a DA-type white dwarf located 20.11 arcseconds west of—at least 190 AU from—HD 74389 A, and has a V magnitude of 14.62.

On August 4, 2016, NASA's Goddard Space Flight Center announced that its citizen science program, Disk Detective, discovered a debris disk orbiting the primary, making this the first disk ever discovered around a star with a companion white dwarf. Cataloged as DDOI AWI00000wz, the disk temperature was observed to be at most 136 K. Although stars with white dwarf companions are common, and there are three known planetary systems with white dwarfs as distant companions (Gl 86, HD 27442, and HD 147513), no debris disks had previously been discovered with a closely associated white dwarf.
