= Columba association =

Stellar association

In astronomy, the Columba association is a nearby 42+6
−4 Myr old stellar association. (Note: A stellar association – sometimes called a moving group – represents a group of stars with similar distance, movement, and age. Since the stars are located in the same general region of space, and moving at the same speed in the same direction, and all formed approximately at the same time, they are suspected of having originally formed together. There is some speculation that many stellar associations are a follow-on stage of open clusters.) The association is named after the constellation Columba which contains many of the stars first recognized in the group.

== Special interest ==
Stars in young associations are a popular target for professional astronomers. The stars are often surrounded by circumstellar disks, discs of dust and other planet forming matter around a young star, and young planets that still glow in the infrared spectrum, which makes it easier to directly image, using the light reflected off of the planets to obtain an image of the planets. The most famous star in the Columba association is HR 8799 which has four directly imaged planets.

The group was at first not recognized as an individual group, but stars within the group were first assigned to the Great Austral Young Association (GAYA), because it showed similar movement and distance compared with two nearby groups. Only later it became clear that GAYA is subdivided into three groups: the Tucana-Horologium association, the Carina association and the Columba association.

The brightest star in the association is the massive star HD 32309, with a spectral type of B9Vann and an apparent magnitude of 4.90 . The association also contains several A-type and F-type stars, such as Omega Aurigae, HR 8799, 26 Geminorum and AS Columbae. It also contains several other variable stars, such as V1358 Orionis, RT Pictoris, DK Leonis, V909 Orionis and GJ 1284. The stars HD 30447 and HD 35847 are members of the group with directly imaged debris disks.

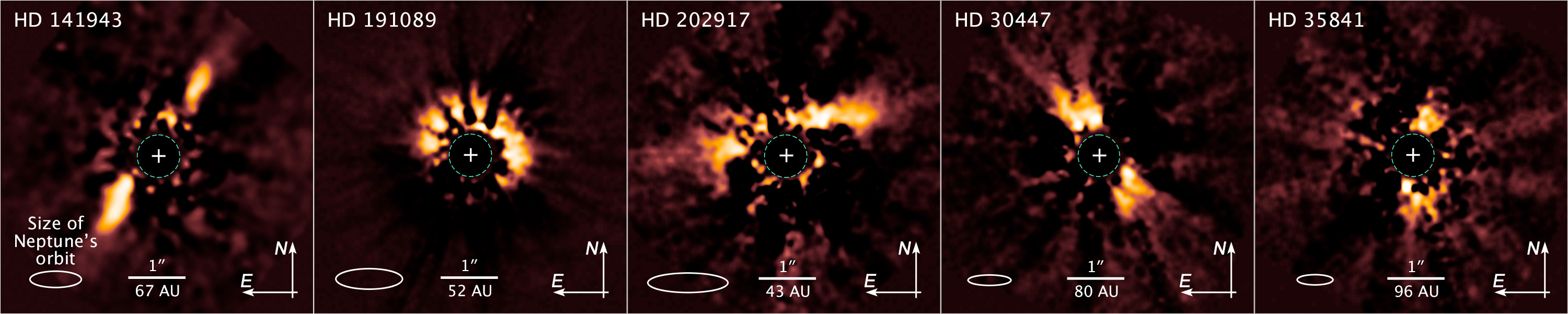
This image shows five debris disks imaged by Hubble/NICMOS. The two disks on the right are around the stars HD 30447 and HD 35847, which are part of the Columba association. HD 202917 in the middle is part of the Tucana-Horologium association and HD 191089 to the left is part of the Beta Pictoris moving group. The star HD 141943 does not belong to any stellar association.

== See also ==
- List of nearby stellar associations and moving groups
- Argus Association
- TW Hydrae association
