= ILT J2336+1842 =

Distant radio galaxy in the constellation of Pegasus

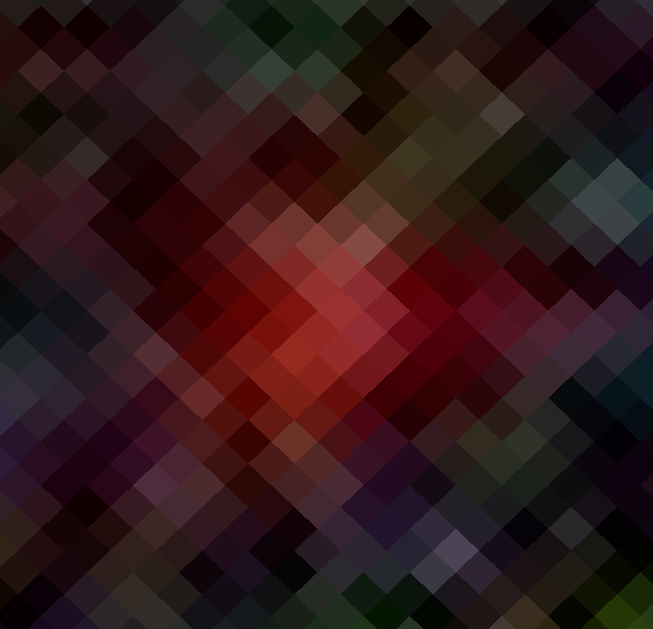
- DESI Legacy DR10 image of ILT J2336+1842

Observation data (J2000 epoch)
- Constellation: Pegasus
- Right ascension: 23^{h} 36^{m} 24.69^{s}
- Declination: +18° 42' 48.71"
- Redshift: 6.6
- Heliocentric radial velocity: 289588
- Distance: 17.547 bly (5,380 mpc)

Characteristics
- Type: QSO
- Size: 8,500 ly (2,600 pc)

Other designations
- ILT J233624.72+184247.9, J2336+1842

ILT J2336+1842 also known as ILT J233624.72+184247.9 is a high-redshift quasar, and radio galaxy at z = 6.6, equivalent to a distance of 17.55 billion light years (5,380 megaparsecs) away. The galaxy has an apparent Z magnitude of 22.04 and is in the constellation of Pegasus. The galaxy was first discovered in 2022 in a survey of 24 radio-bright quasars between redshifts z = 4.9 to z = 6.6. As of 2023, it is believed to be the most distant radio galaxy known, greatly succeeding TGSS J1530+1049.

== Physical properties ==
ILT J2336+1842 is a dwarf galaxy that is not known to be a part of galaxy clusters and it is probably a field galaxy. Using an angular diameter of 0.1 arcsecs from the eight data release from the DESI telescope, and a redshift-based distance of 5,380 megaparsecs, it has an estimated diameter of 8,500 light years (2,600 parsecs).

The galactic center contains a radio-bright quasar with an estimated absolute luminosity of -24.32, equivalent to 457.09 billion L_{☉} making it one of the most luminous high redshift quasars discovered.

In 2023, it was discovered in the second data-release of the LOFAR Two-Metre Sky Survey (LoTSS). The radio lobes have an extent of 54.8 kiloparsecs or 179,000 light years across based on an angular diameter of 10.13 arcsecs. With a predicted redshift of z = 6.6 it is believed to the furthest known radio galaxy being more distant than the previous most distant radio galaxy, TGSS J1530+1049.

== See also ==
- TGSS J1530+1049, previous most distant radio galaxy.
- GLEAM J0917-0012, potentially more distant with a maximum redshift of z = 8.
