= TGSS J1530+1049 =

Distant radio galaxy in the constellation of Serpens

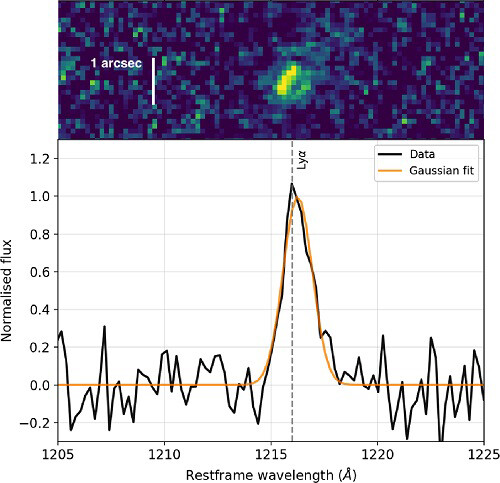
- Here is a two dimensional spectrum with a strong emission line from GMOS of TGSS J1530+1049.

Observation data
- Constellation: Serpens
- Right ascension: 15^{h} 30^{m} 49.44^{s}
- Declination: +10° 49′ 20.0″
- Redshift: 4.0 (according to the observations made by the James Webb Space Telescope). 5.72 (according to the observations made by the Gemini Observatory).
- Distance: 12.5 billion light years (light travel distance)

Characteristics
- Type: High redshift radio galaxy, galaxy merger
- Mass: 10^10.5 solar mass M_{☉}
- Size: 3.5 kiloparsecs (11,415 light years)
- Notable features: Most distant radio galaxy discovered to date

TGSS J1530+1049 was the most distant known radio galaxy when it was discovered in 2018, before it was outplaced by the discovery of the more distant ILT J2336+1842 in 2023. It was discovered at a redshift distance of z=5.72, placing it close to the epoch of reionization and classifying it has a high redshift radio galaxy (HzRG), though recent imaging from the James Webb Space Telescope in 2025 may indicate a closer redshift of z=4.0. The galaxy has a size of 3.5 kiloparsecs, comparable to radio galaxies at z>4 and has a luminosity of 5.7x10^42 ergs, making it comparable in luminosity to non-radio galaxies located at similar redshift distances. In 2023, it was discovered in the LOFAR Two-Metre Sky Survey that a radio galaxy named ILT J2336+1842 was more distant at redshift z = 6.6. However, another radio galaxy named GLEAM J0917-0012 may be farther but its distance is undetermined (likely z=7).

TGSS J1530+1049 is likely early in its phase of evolution and still assembling which was determined due to its relatively low stellar mass compared to other radio galaxies (10^10.5 solar masses). The radio emission is powered by a supermassive black hole (SMBH) consuming material from the surrounding environment. This galaxy's massive black hole provides evidence that black holes had grown very quickly to supermassive sizes in the early universe.

== See also ==
- ILT J2336+1842, current most distant radio galaxy.
- GLEAM J0917-0012, a potentially more distant radio galaxy.
