= Clumping factor =

The clumping factor is a measurement of density variations within a gaseous medium. It is commonly employed in cosmological simulations as a key external parameter involved in modeling reionization. It may also be used in general to describe optically thin clumping. It is commonly given as the ratio of the mean squared number density to the squared mean number density.

== Motivation ==
Ionization within the intergalactic medium is generally modeled via a differential equation relating the rate at which hydrogen is ionized and the rate at which it recombines:
$$\frac{dQ}{dt} = \frac{\dot{n}_\text{ion}}{\langle n_\text{H}\rangle} - \frac{Q}{\bar{t}_\text{rec}}$$
given in terms of volume filling factor $Q(t)$, ionizing photon production rate per volume $\dot{n}_\text{ion}$, mean hydrogen number density $\langle n_\text{H} \rangle$, and volume-averaged recombination time $\bar{t}_\text{rec}$. In astrophysical settings, however, gas is generally turbulent, possessing density structure at all spatial scales. As a result, the recombination rate is sensitive to this small-scale turbulent variation, and is proportional to the square of the local ionized gas density. This small-scale turbulent variation defines the clumping factor, given in terms of spatial averages:
$$C(\rho) = \frac{\langle \rho^2 \rangle}{\langle \rho \rangle^2}.$$
It may also be given in terms of variance and expected value,
$$C(\rho) = \frac{\sigma_\rho^2}{\mathbb{E}(\rho)^2} + 1$$
Estimates for clumping factor in cosmological simulations depend on the prescription defining the intergalactic medium, however, as if recombinations associated with galaxies are counted this leads to double counting and overestimation of the clumping factor. The clumping factor is also generally time-dependent as a result of temperature-dependent density fluctuations.

As emission also scales as the squared mean number density, the clumping factor may be used to convert from inferred uniform density $\rho_\text{obs}$ to true density $\rho_\text{true}$:
$$\rho_\text{true} = \frac{\rho_\text{obs}}{C^{1/2}}$$
using the identity that the square of the smoothed density is equal to the square of the average of the true density.
