= Lyman continuum photons =

Photons emitted from stars at photon energies above the Lyman limit

Lyman continuum photons (abbrev. LyC), shortened to Ly continuum photons or Lyc photons, are the photons emitted from stars or active galactic nuclei at photon energies above the Lyman limit. Hydrogen is ionized by absorbing LyC. Working from Victor Schumann's discovery of ultraviolet light, from 1906 to 1914, Theodore Lyman observed that at wavelengths above the limit atomic hydrogen absorbs light only at specific frequencies (or wavelengths) and the Lyman series is thus named after him. All the wavelengths in the Lyman series are in the ultraviolet band. This quantized absorption behavior occurs only up to an energy limit, known as the ionization energy. In the case of neutral atomic hydrogen, the minimum ionization energy is equal to the Lyman limit, where the photon has enough energy to completely ionize the atom, resulting in a free proton and a free electron. Above this energy (below this wavelength), all wavelengths of light may be absorbed. This forms a continuum in the energy spectrum; the spectrum is continuous rather than composed of many discrete lines, which are seen at lower energies.

The Lyman Series

The Lyman limit is at the wavelength of 91.2 nm (912 Å), corresponding to a frequency of 3.29 million GHz and a photon energy of 13.6 eV. LyC energies are mostly in the ultraviolet C portion of the electromagnetic spectrum (see Lyman series). Although X-rays and gamma-rays will also ionize a hydrogen atom, there are far fewer of them emitted from a star's photosphere—LyC are predominantly UV-C. The photon absorption process leading to the ionization of atomic hydrogen can occur in reverse: an electron and a proton can collide and form atomic hydrogen. If the two particles were traveling slowly (so that kinetic energy can be ignored), then the photon the atom emits upon its creation can be 13.6 eV (but the energy will be less if the atom is formed in an excited state). At faster relative velocity, the energy is radiated as photons of lower wavelength (higher energy). Therefore, photons with energies above 13.6 eV are emitted by energetic protons and electrons forming atomic hydrogen, such as emission from photoionized hydrogen.

== See also ==
- Balmer limit
- Lyman-alpha blob
- Lyman-alpha forest
- Lyman-break galaxy
- Lyman series
- Haro 11 - One of the two galaxies in the local universe that 'leaks' Lyman continuum photons.
- Tololo-1247-232 - The second galaxy in the local universe that 'leaks' Lyman continuum photons.
- Pea galaxy - Many nearby Green Peas are confirmed LyC 'leakers'.
- Reionization
