= Haro 11 =

Galaxy in the constellation Sculptor

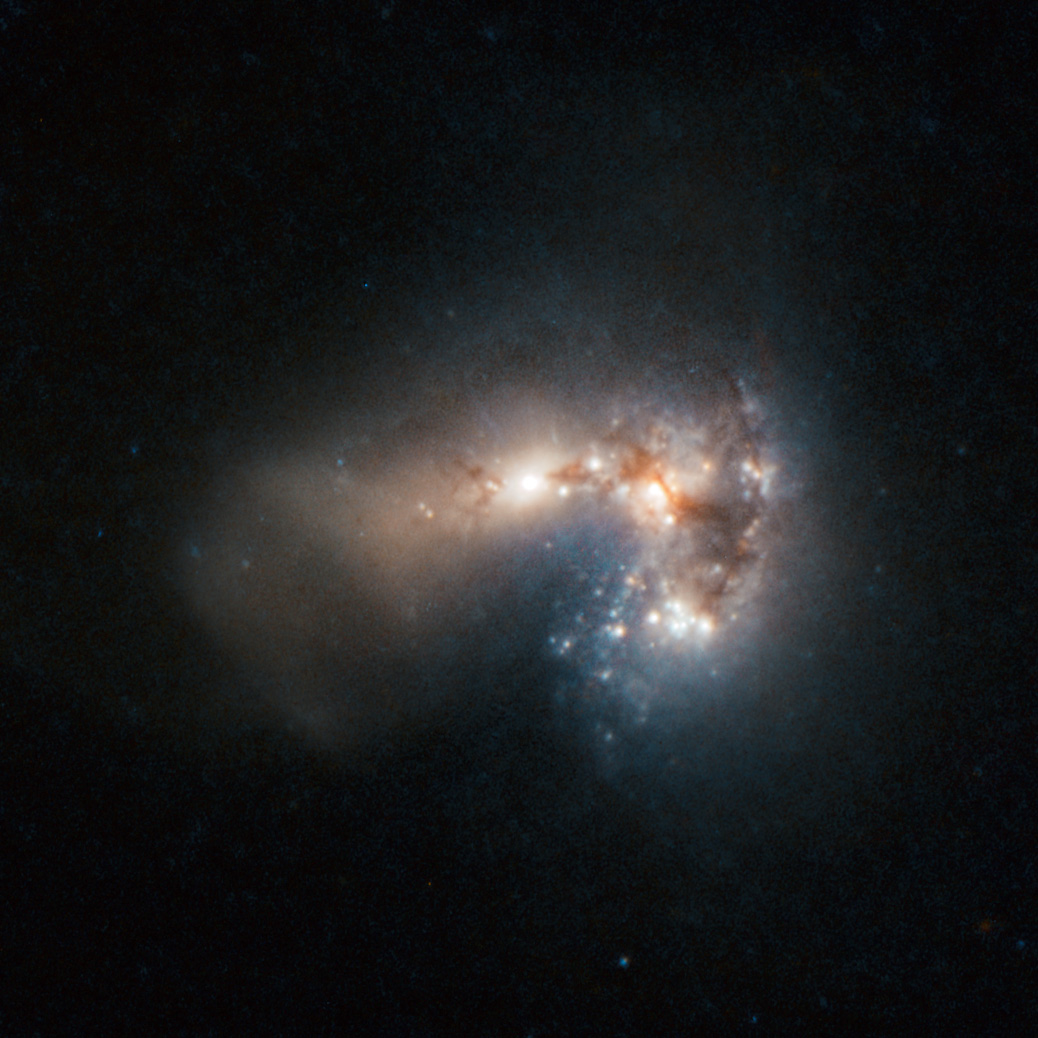
- Starburst Galaxy Haro 11 (ESO)

Observation data (J2000 epoch)
- Constellation: Sculptor
- Right ascension: 00^{h} 36^{m} 52.7^{s}
- Declination: −33° 33′ 17.2″
- Redshift: 0.020598
- Distance: 300 million ly

Characteristics
- Type: Starburst galaxy
- Notable features: Lyman continuum Leaker

Other designations
- ESO 350-IG 038, PGC 002204, AM 0034-334 et al.

Haro 11 (H11) is a small galaxy at a distance of 300,000,000 light-years (92,000,000 parsecs)(redshift z=0.020598). It is situated in the southern constellation of Sculptor. Visually, it appears to be an irregular galaxy, as the ESO image to the right shows. H11 is named after Guillermo Haro, a Mexican astronomer who first included it in a study published in 1956 about blue galaxies. H11 is a starburst galaxy that has 'super star clusters' within it and is one of nine galaxies in the local universe known to emit Lyman continuum photons (LyC).

== Background ==
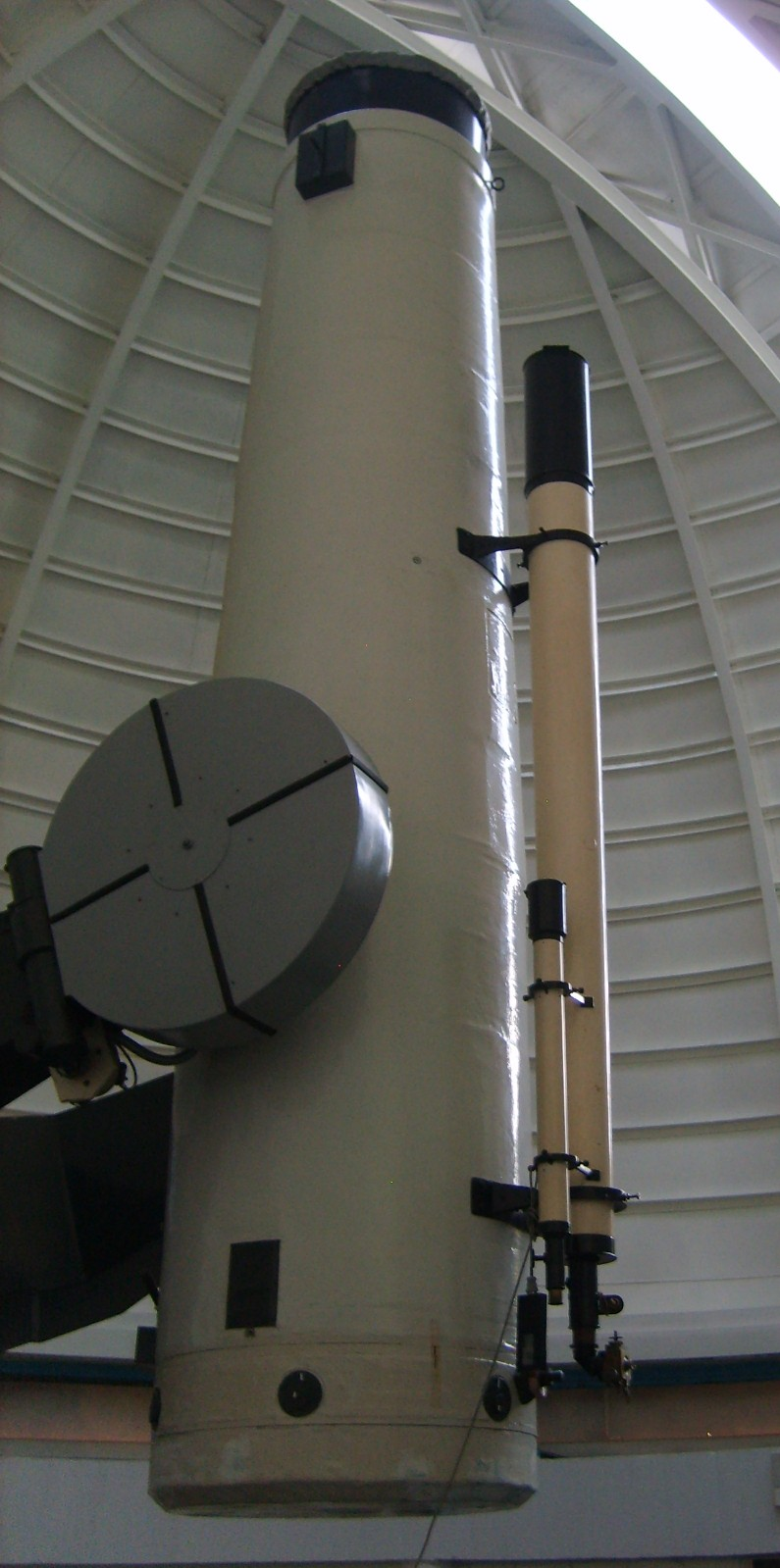
The Schmidt Camera at the Tonantzintla Observatory.

Guillermo Haro first described H11 in a study published in 1956 listing 44 galaxies that were blue. The observations had been carried out at the Tonantzintla Observatory in Mexico using the Schmidt Camera. Since then, The NASA/IPAC Extragalactic Database (NED) gives 123 citations for H11. The first study showing the possible escape of Lyman continuum photons was published in 2006, using data from the Far Ultraviolet Spectroscopic Explorer (FUSE). The study's aim was to select "an extreme starburst dwarf, the Blue Compact Galaxy Haro 11, with the aim of determining the Lyman continuum escape fraction from UV spectroscopy."

The image in the information box above right was made combining data from ESO's Very Large Telescope and the NASA/ESA Hubble Space Telescope. A team of astronomers at Stockholm University, Sweden, and the Geneva Observatory, Switzerland, identified 200 separate clusters of very young, massive stars, many of which are less than 10 million years old. The observations have led the astronomers to conclude that H11 is most likely the result of a merger between a galaxy that is rich in stars and a younger, gas-rich galaxy.

== Lyman continuum photons ==
Haro 11 is one of nine galaxies in the local universe that have been identified as leaking Lyman continuum photons.

LyC leakage is crucial to the process known as reionization which is theorised to have occurred between redshift z=11 and z=7, that is to say within the first 10% of the age of the Universe. Reionization, or The Epoch of Reionization (EofR), is the period during which the gas in the early Universe went from being almost completely neutral to a state in which it became almost completely ionized. The EofR is intimately linked to many fundamental questions in cosmology, structure formation and evolution.

== Kinematics of Haro 11 ==
In November 2015, a study was published in the journal Astronomy and Astrophysics by Göran Östlin et al. which examined the kinematics of H11 using observations collected at the European Southern Observatory, Paranal, Chile. The study also compared H11 to The Antennae Galaxies (NGC 4038), a pair of interacting galaxies. The abstract states: "In this work, we investigate the kinematics of stars and ionised gas in Haro 11, one of the most luminous blue compact galaxies in the local Universe." Further on, the abstract states: "Hence the complexities reveal real dynamical disturbances providing further evidence for a merger in Haro 11." The abstract finishes with: "Haro 11 shows many resemblances with the famous Antennae galaxies both morphologically and kinematically, but it is much denser, which is the likely explanation for the higher star formation efficiency in Haro 11."

== Further studies ==
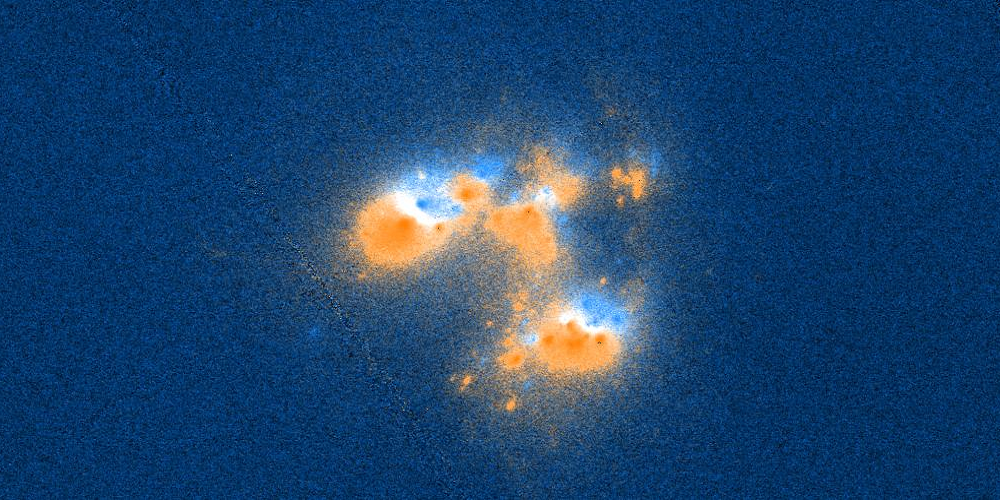
A picture of Haro 11 taken in 2002 by Daniel Kunth and team with the HST ACS as part of program 9470.

In September 2003, as a result of Program 9470, Daniel Kunth and team published the first images of Haro 11 using the then newly installed ACS on the HST (specifically the Solar Blind Channel) in a study titled: "The First Deep Advanced Camera for Surveys Lyalpha Images of Local Starburst Galaxies". The abstract for Kunth et al. states: "The ACS imaging reveals a complex Lyalpha morphology, with sometimes strong offsets between the emission of Lyalpha and the location of stellar light, ionized gas traced by Halpha, and the neutral gas. Overall, more Lyalpha photons escape from the more metal- and dust-rich galaxy ESO 350-IG038 [Haro 11]."

== See also ==
- Lyman series
- Lyman-alpha forest
- Pea galaxy
- Precision Array for Probing the Epoch of Reionization (PAPER)
- Tololo 1247-232
