= Tololo 1247−232 =

Galaxy in the constellation Hydra

Tololo 1247−232 (T1247)
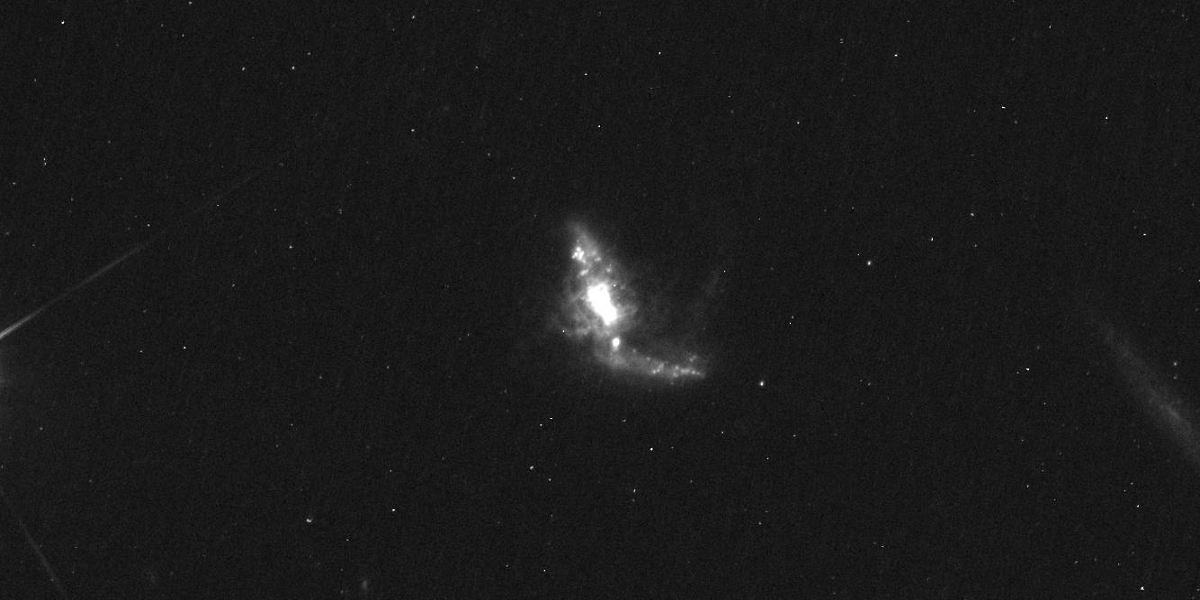
- An image from the HST WFC of T1247, which was observed in 2013 as part of Program 13027. This is a combination image (by stacking) made by William Keel (University of Alabama) in 2015. The images used are taken from Program 13027.

Observation data (J2000 epoch)
- Constellation: Hydra
- Right ascension: 12^{h} 50^{m} 18.80^{s}
- Declination: −23° 33′ 57.0″
- Redshift: 0.0480
- Distance: 652 million ly
- Apparent magnitude (V): −21

Characteristics
- Type: Starburst galaxy
- Notable features: Lyman Continuum leaker

Other designations
- Tol 1247, EC 12476−2317, To 1247, PGC 83589

Tololo 1247−232 (Tol 1247 or T1247) is a small galaxy at a distance of 652 million light-years (200 million parsecs) (redshift z=0.0480). It is situated in the southern equatorial constellation of Hydra. Visually, Tol 1247 appears to be an irregular or possibly a barred spiral galaxy. Tol 1247 is named after the surveys that were carried at the Cerro Tololo Inter-American Observatory (CTIO), the first of which was in 1976. It is one of nine galaxies in the local universe known to emit Lyman continuum photons.

== Background ==
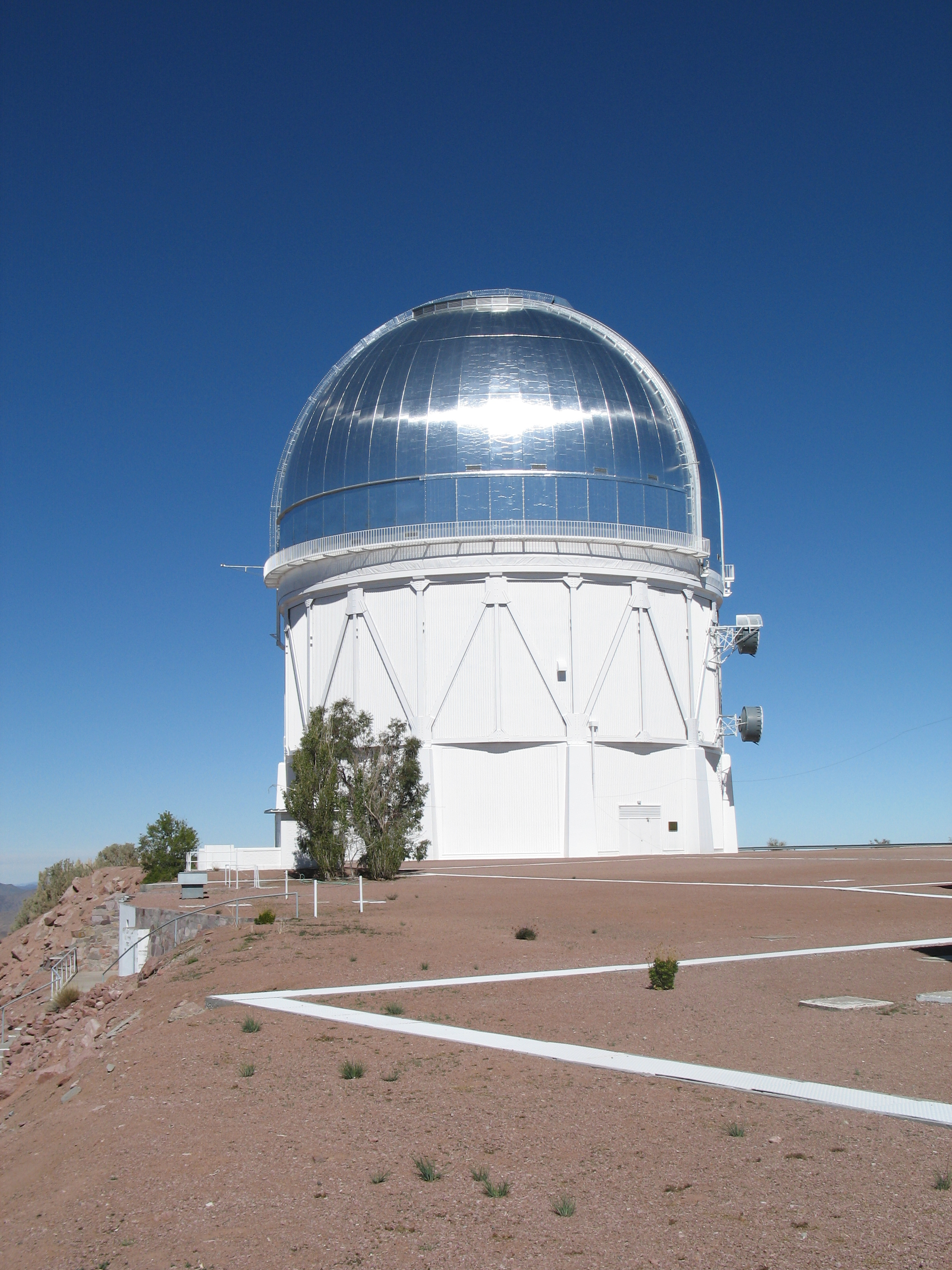
The Victor M. Blanco Telescope at CTIO

Tol 1247−232 (T1247) was first described in 1985. It was observed in the infrared using the Cerro Tololo Inter-American Observatory (CTIO) 4m telescope, as part of a study of regions of intense star formation.

Six years later, T1247 was identified as an HII galaxy in the paper 'A spectrophotometric catalogue of HII galaxies', a study of 425 emission-line galaxies. T1247 has also been classified as a starburst galaxy, a blue compact dwarf and a Wolf–Rayet galaxy.

== Lyman continuum leakage ==
T1247 is one of nine galaxies in the local universe that have been identified as leaking Lyman continuum (LyC) photons. The first published detection of Lyman continuum photons from T1247 was made in 2013 by Leitet et al. using data from the Far Ultraviolet Spectroscopic Explorer (FUSE). It was the second-known LyC-leaking source in the local universe.

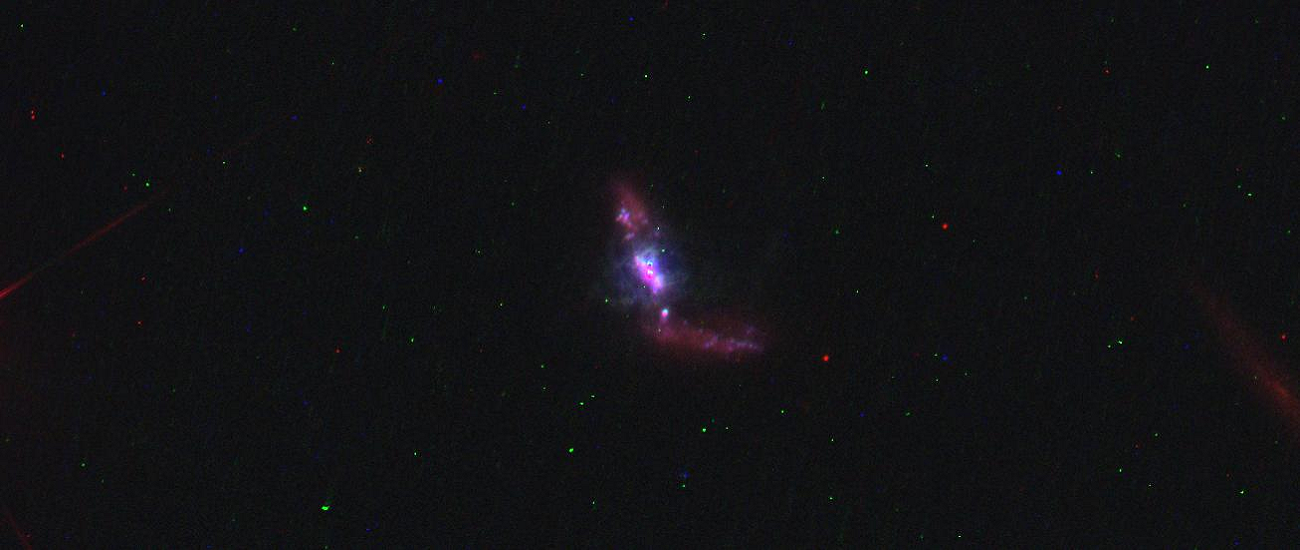
An image from the HST WFC (using the UVIS channel) taken in 2013 as part of Program 13027

LyC leakage is crucial to the process known as reionization which is believed to have occurred within the first 10% of the age of the universe. The cosmic reionization is, after recombination, the second major phase-change of hydrogen in the universe. The epoch of reionization began when the first sources appeared which produced photons capable of ionizing the surrounding medium, and ended when all of the intergalactic medium (IGM) was ionized. LyC photons are responsible for this process. However, to date it is unclear which physical mechanisms effectively produce large amounts of LyC photons, such that the reionization of the universe could be powered. Two processes are currently discussed and under evaluation: active galactic nuclei (AGN) and starbursts in dwarf galaxies. AGNs are known to produce large amounts of LyC emission, but in the early universe the number of AGNs is unknown, and often believed to be too small to power the reionization. On the other side, dwarf starbursts are known to be numerous in the early universe, but their LyC emission is unknown. For that reason local galaxies such as TOL1247 are studied in detail, in order to understand physical processes that produce escaping LyC photons. In TOL1247 it was found that bulk of the LyC photons emerges from two massive stellar clusters located in the central region of the galaxy. The escape is supported by the structure of the interstellar medium of the galaxy, which appears to be clumpy and highly ionized. Although Puschnig et al. (2017) could verify that LyC indeed escapes from TOL1247, their new spectroscopic data obtained with the Cosmic Origins Spectrograph of the Hubble Space Telescope indicates a relatively low number of escaping LyC photons (only 1.5% escape fraction). Thus, if galaxies in the early universe were similar to TOL1247, they would indeed contribute to reionization, but not sufficiently to explain the second major phase-change in the universe.

== See also ==
- Pea galaxy
- Haro 11
- Lyman-alpha forest
- Lyman series
- Precision Array for Probing the Epoch of Reionization
