= Pea galaxy =

Possible type of luminous blue compact galaxy

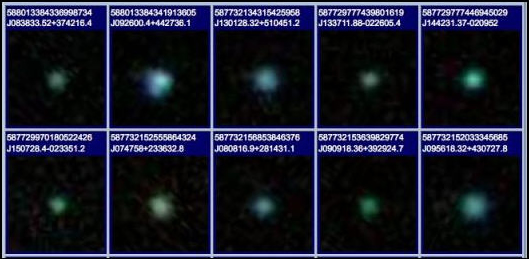
Galaxy Zoo green peas

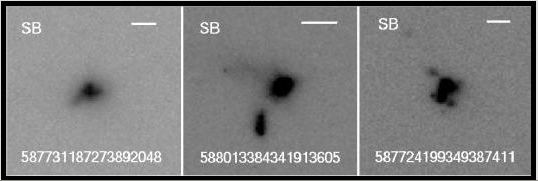
Three Hubble Space Telescope pictures of green peas

A pea galaxy, also referred to as a pea or green pea, might be a type of luminous blue compact galaxy that is undergoing very high rates of star formation. Pea galaxies are so-named because of their small size and greenish appearance in the images taken by the Sloan Digital Sky Survey (SDSS).

"Pea" galaxies were first discovered in 2007 by the volunteer citizen scientists within the forum section of the online astronomy project Galaxy Zoo (GZ), part of the Zooniverse web portal.

== Description ==
The pea galaxies, also known as green peas (GPs), are compact oxygen-rich emission line galaxies that were discovered at redshift between z = 0.112 and 0.360. These low-mass galaxies have an upper size limit generally no bigger than 16,300 light-years (5,000 pc) across, and typically they reside in environments less than two-thirds the density of normal galaxy environments. An average GP has a redshift of z = 0.258, a mass of ~3,200 million M_{☉} (~3,200 million solar masses), a star formation rate of ~10 M_{☉}/yr (~10 solar masses a year), an [O III] equivalent width of 69.4 nm and a low metallicity. They have a strong emission line at the [OIII] wavelength of 500.7 nm. [OIII], O^{++} or doubly ionized oxygen, is a forbidden mechanism of the visible spectrum and is only possible at very low density. When the entire photometric SDSS catalogue was searched, 40,222 objects were returned, which leads to the conclusion the GPs are rare objects.

GPs are the least massive and most actively star-forming galaxies in the local universe. "These galaxies would have been normal in the early Universe, but we just don't see such active galaxies today", said astrophysicist Dr. Kevin Schawinski. "Understanding the green peas may tell us something about how stars were formed in the early Universe and how galaxies evolve".

GPs exist at a time when the universe was three-quarters of its current age and so are clues as to how galaxy formation and evolution took place in the early universe. With the publication of Amorin's GTC paper in February 2012, it is now thought that GPs might be old galaxies having formed most of their stellar mass several billion years ago. Old stars have been spectroscopically confirmed in one of the three galaxies in the study by the presence of magnesium.

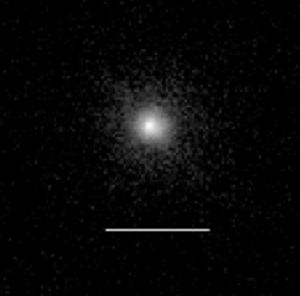
A Hubble Space Telescope Cosmic Origins Spectrograph near-UV image of pea galaxy GP_J1219

In January 2016, a study was published in the journal Nature identifying J0925+1403 as a Lyman continuum photons (LyC) 'leaker' with an escape fraction of ~8% (see section below). A follow-up study using the same Hubble Space Telescope (HST) data identifies four more LyC leakers, described as GPs. In 2014–15, two separate sources identified two other GPs to be likely LyC leaking candidates (GP J1219 and GP J0815), suggesting that these two GPs are also low-redshift analogs of high-redshift Lyman-alpha and LyC leakers. Finding local LyC leakers is crucial to theories about the early universe and reionization. (for more details see Izotov et al. 2016)

The image to the right shows pea galaxy GP_J1219. This was observed in 2014 by a HST team whose principal investigator was Alaina Henry, using the Cosmic Origins Spectrograph and the near ultraviolet channel. The scale bar in the image shows 1 arc second (1"), which corresponds to ~10,750 light years at the distance of 2.69 billion light years for GP_J1219. When using the COS Multi-Anode Micro-channel Array, in NUV imaging mode, the detector plate scale is ~40 pixels per arcsecond (0.0235 arcseconds per pixel).

GPs feature significantly within the Zoogems project, which uses HST to examine images of interest from the citizen science websites Galaxy Zoo and Radio Galaxy Zoo, collected since 2007. Among the ~300 possible candidates for the Zoogems observations are 75 GPs. The original GP classifications used SDSS images, which are not as good quality as the HST examples.

== History of discovery ==
=== Years 2007 to 2009 ===
Galaxy Zoo (GZ) is a project online since July 2007 that seeks to classify up to one million galaxies. On July 28, 2007, two days after the start of the Galaxy Zoo Internet forum, citizen scientist 'Nightblizzard' posted two green objects thought to be galaxies. A discussion, or thread, was started on this forum by Hanny Van Arkel (cf. Hanny's Voorwerp) on the 12th of August 2007 called "Give peas a chance" in which various green objects were posted. This thread started humorously, as the name is a word play of the title of the John Lennon song "Give Peace a Chance", but by December 2007, it had become clear that some of these unusual objects were a distinct group of galaxies. These "pea galaxies" appear in the SDSS as unresolved green images. This is because the peas have a very bright, or powerful, spectral line in their spectra for highly-ionized oxygen, which in SDSS color composites increases the luminosity, or brightness, of the "r" color band with respect to the two other color bands "g" and "i". The "r" color band shows as green in SDSS images. Enthusiasts, calling themselves the "Peas Corps" (another humorous play on the Peace Corps), collected over a hundred of these peas, which were eventually placed together into a dedicated discussion thread started by Carolin Cardamone in July 2008. The collection, once refined, provided values that could be used in a systematic computer search of the GZ database of one million objects, which eventually resulted in a sample of 251 pea galaxies, also known as green peas (GPs).

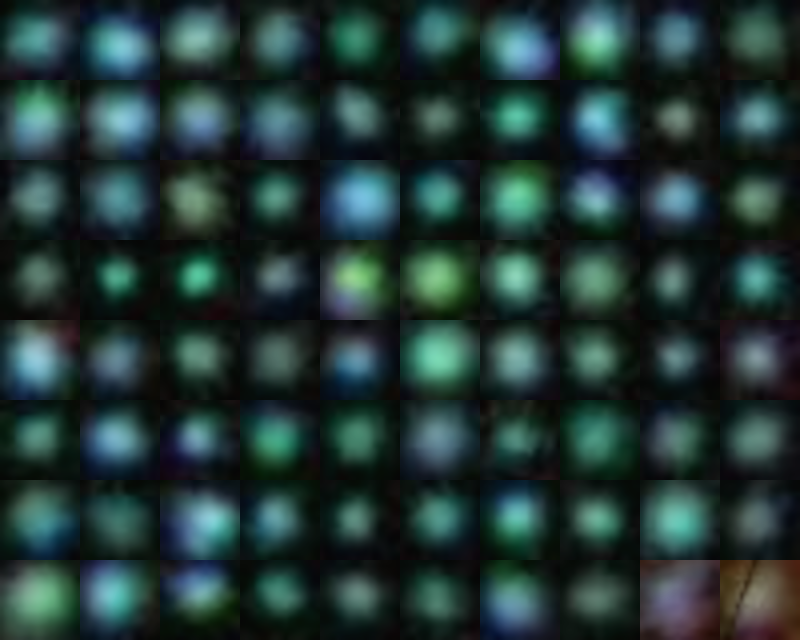
A composite of images from SDSS DR7 showing the 80 green pea galaxies listed in Cardamone et al. (2009).

In November 2009, authors C. Cardamone et al. published a paper in the MNRAS titled "Galaxy Zoo Green Peas: Discovery of A Class of Compact Extremely Star-Forming Galaxies". Within this paper, 10 Galaxy Zoo volunteers are acknowledged as having made a particularly significant contribution. They are: Elisabeth Baeten, Gemma Coughlin, Dan Goldstein, Brian Legg, Mark McCallum, Christian Manteuffel, Richard Nowell, Richard Proctor, Alice Sheppard and Hanny Van Arkel. They are thanked for "giving peas a chance". For more details see: Cardamone 2009 Physics

The original 80 GPs were part of a sample from the SDSS data-release 7 (DR7), but did not include galaxies from other sources which might have been classed as GPs if they were in the SDSS sample. One example of a paper that demonstrates this is: In April 2009, J. J. Salzer et al. published a paper in the Astrophysical Journal Letters titled "A Population of Metal-Poor Galaxies with ~L* Luminosities at Intermediate Redshifts". In this paper, "new spectroscopy and metallicity estimates for a sample of 15 star-forming galaxies with redshifts in the range 0.29 – 0.42" were presented. These objects were selected using the KPNO International Spectroscopic Survey (KISS). 3 of these 15 when viewed as objects in SDSS are green (KISSR 1516, KISSR 2042 and KISSRx 467). Quoting from Salzer et al. 2009 "A New Class of Galaxy? Given the large number of studies of metal abundances in galaxies with intermediate and high redshift mentioned in the Introduction, it may seem odd that systems similar to those described here have not been recognized previously."

=== 2010 - 2012 ===
In June 2010, authors R. Amorin et al. published a paper in ApJ Letters titled "On the oxygen and nitrogen chemical abundances and the evolution of the "green pea" galaxies". In it they explore issues concerning the metallicity of 79 GPs, disputing the original findings in Cardamone et al. They conclude, "arguing that recent interaction-induced inflow of gas, possibly coupled with a selective metal-rich gas loss drive by supernova winds may explain our findings and the known galaxy properties". For more details see: Two papers by Amorin

In February 2011, authors Y. Izotov et al. published a paper in the ApJ titled "Green Pea Galaxies and Cohorts: Luminous Compact Emission-line Galaxies in the Sloan Digital Sky Survey". They find that the 80 GPs are not a rare class of galaxies on their own, but rather a subset of a class known as 'Luminous Compact Galaxies' (LCGs), of which there are 803. For more details see: Luminous compact galaxies

In November 2011, authors Y. Izotov et al. published a paper in A&A titled 'Star-forming galaxies with hot dust emission in the SDSS discovered by the Wide-field Infrared Survey Explorer (WISE)'. In this paper, they find four galaxies that have very red colours in the wavelength range 3.4 micrometres (W1) and 4.6 micrometres (W2). This implies that the dust in these galaxies is at temperatures up to 1000K. These four galaxies are GPs and more than double the number of known galaxies with these characteristics.

In January 2012, authors R. Amorin et al. published a 'Conference proceeding' titled "Unveiling the Nature of the "Green Pea" galaxies". In this publication, they announce that they have conducted a set of observations using the Optical System for Imaging and low Resolution Integrated Spectroscopy (OSIRIS) at the Gran Telescopio Canarias, and that there is a forthcoming paper about their research. These observations "will provide new insights on the evolutionary state of the green peas. In particular, we will be able to see whether the green peas show an extended, old stellar population underlying the young starbursts, like those typically dominant in terms of stellar mass in most blue compact galaxies". For more details see: Two papers by Amorin

In January 2012, authors L. Pilyugin et al. published a paper in the MNRAS titled: "Abundance determination from global emission-line SDSS spectra: exploring objects with high N/O ratios". In it they compare the oxygen and nitrogen abundances derived from global emission-line SDSS spectra of galaxies using (i) the electron temperature method and (ii) two recent strong line O/N and N/S calibrations. Three sets of objects were compared: i) Composite hydrogen-rich nebula, ii) 281 SDSS galaxies and iii) A sample of GPs with detectable [OIII]-4363 auroral lines. Among the questions surrounding the GPs is how much nebulae influence their spectra and results. Through comparisons of the three objects using proven methodology and analysis of metallicity, they conclude that "the high nitrogen-to-oxygen ratios derived in some green pea galaxies may be caused by the fact that their SDSS spectra are spectra of composite nebulae made up of several components with different physical properties (such as metallicity). However, for the hottest green pea galaxies, which appear to be dwarf galaxies, this explanation does not seem to be plausible."

In January 2012, author S. Hawley published a paper in the PASP titled "Abundances in "Green Pea" Star-forming Galaxies". In this paper, former NASA astronaut Steven Hawley compares the results from previous GP papers regarding their metallicities. Hawley compares different ways of calibrating and interpreting the various results, mainly from Cardamone et al. and Amorin et al. but some from Izotov et al., and suggests why the various discrepancies between these papers' findings might be. He also considers such details as the contribution of Wolf–Rayet stars to the gas ionization, and which sets of emission lines give the most accurate results for these galaxies. He ends by writing: "The calibrations derived from the green peas differ from those commonly utilized and would be useful if star-forming galaxies like the green peas with extremely hot ionizing sources are found to be more common."

In February 2012, authors S. Chakraborti et al. published a paper in The ApJ Letters titled 'Radio Detection of Green Peas: Implications for Magnetic Fields in Young Galaxies'. In this paper, magnetism studies using new data from the Giant Metrewave Radio Telescope describe various observations based around the GPs. They show that the three "very young" starburst galaxies that were studied have magnetic fields larger than the Milky Way. This is at odds with the current understanding that galaxies build up their magnetic properties over time. For more details see: Radio detection

In April 2012, authors R. Amorin et al. published a paper in the ApJ titled "The Star Formation History and Metal Content of the 'Green Peas'. New Detailed GTC-OSIRIS spectrophotometry of Three Galaxies". They give the results for the deep broad-band imaging and long-slit spectroscopy for 3 GPs that had been observed using the OSIRIS instrument, mounted on the 10.4m Gran Telescopio Canarias at the Roque de los Muchachos Observatory. For more details see: GTC-OSIRIS

In August 2012, authors R. Amorín et al. published a paper in the ApJ Letters titled "Complex gas kinematics in compact, rapidly assembling star-forming galaxies". Using the ISIS spectrograph on the William Herschel Telescope, they publish results of the high-quality spectra that they took of six galaxies, five of which are GPs. After studying the hydrogen alpha emission lines (ELs) in the spectra of all six, it is shown that these ELs are made up of multiple lines, meaning that the GPs have several chunks of gas and stars moving at large velocities relative to each other. These ELs also show that the GPs are effectively a 'turbulent mess', with parts (or clumps) moving at speeds of over 500 km/s (five hundred km/s) relative to each other.

=== 2013–2015 ===
In January 2013, authors S. Parnovsky et al. published a paper in A&SS titled "H alpha and UV luminosities and star formation rates in a large sample of luminous compact galaxies". In it, they present a statistical study of the star formation rates (SFR) derived from the GALEX observations in the Ultraviolet continuum and in the H alpha emission line for a sample of ~800 luminous compact galaxies (LCGs). Within the larger set of LCGs, including the GPs, SFR of up to ~110 M_{☉}/yr (~110 solar masses a year) are found, as well as estimates of the ages of the starbursts.

In April 2013, authors A. Jaskot and M. Oey published a paper in the ApJ titled "The Origin and Optical Depth of Ionizing Radiation in the "Green Pea" Galaxies". Six "extreme" GPs are studied. Using these, the authors endeavour to narrow down the list of possibilities about what is producing the radiation and the substantial amounts of high-energy photon that might be escaping from the GPs. Following on from this paper, observations on the Hubble Space Telescope, totalling 24 orbits, were taken in December 2013. The Cosmic Origins Spectrograph and the Advanced Camera for Surveys were used on four of the "extreme" GPs. For more details see: Two papers by Jaskot and Oey

In January 2014, authors Y. Izotov et al. published a paper in A&A entitled "Multi-wavelength study of 14000 star-forming galaxies from the Sloan Digital Sky Survey". In it they use a variety of sources to demonstrate "that the emission emerging from young star-forming regions is the dominant dust-heating source for temperatures to several hundred degrees in the sample star-forming galaxies". The first source of data is SDSS from which 14,610 spectra with strong emission lines are selected. Those spectra were then cross-identified with sources from photometric sky surveys in other wavelength ranges, which are: i) GALEX for the ultraviolet, ii) The 2MASS survey for the near-infrared, iii) The WISE All-Sky Source Catalog for infrared at differing wavelengths, iv) The IRAS survey for the far-infrared and the v) NVSS Survey at radio-wavelengths. Only a small fraction of the SDSS objects were detected in the last two surveys. Among the results is a list of 20 galaxies with the highest magnitudes which have hot dust of several hundred degrees. Of these 20, all could be classified as GPs and/or LCGs. Also among the results, the luminosity is obtained in the sample galaxies in a wide wavelength range. At the highest luminosities, the sample galaxies had luminosites approaching those of high-redshift Lyman-break galaxy.

In January 2014, authors A. Jaskot et al. gave a presentation titled "Neutral Gas and Low-Redshift Starbursts: From Infall to Ionization" to the AAS at their meeting #223. The presentation included data from The Arecibo Observatory Legacy Fast ALFA Survey (ALFALFA). The authors analyzed the optical spectra of the GPs and concluded "While the ALFALFA survey demonstrates the role of external processes in triggering starbursts, the green peas show that starbursts' radiation can escape to affect their external environment", finding "that the peas are likely optically thin to Lyman continuum (LyC) radiation."

In June 2014, authors A. Jaskot and M. Oey published a conference report titled "The Origin and Optical Depth of Ionizing Photons in the Green Pea Galaxies". This appears in "Massive Young Star Clusters Near and Far: From the Milky Way to Reionization", based on the 2013 Guillermo Haro Conference. For more details see: Two papers by Jaskot and Oey.

In May 2015, authors A. Henry, C et al. published a paper in the ApJ entitled, "Lyα Emission from Green Peas: The Role of Circumgalactic Gas Density, Covering, and Kinematics". In this paper, ten green peas were studied in the ultraviolet, using high-resolution spectroscopy with the Hubble Space Telescope using the Cosmic Origins Spectrograph. This study showed, for the first time, that green peas have strong Lyα emission much like distant, high-redshift galaxies observed in a younger universe. Henry et al. explored the physical mechanisms that determine how Lyα escapes from the green peas, and concluded that variations in the neutral hydrogen column density were the most important factor. For more details see: Lyman Alpha Emission from Green Peas.

=== 2016–2017 ===
In May 2016, author Miranda C. P. Straub published a research paper in the open access journal Citizen Science: Theory and Practice called 'Giving Citizen Scientists a Chance: A Study of Volunteer-led Scientific Discovery'. The abstract states: "The discovery of a class of galaxies called green peas provides an example of scientific work done by volunteers. This unique situation arose out of a science crowdsourcing website called Galaxy Zoo."

In April 2016, Yang et al. published "Green Pea Galaxies Reveal Secrets of Lyα Escape." Archival Lyman-alpha spectra of 12 GPs that have been observed with the HST/COS were analysed and modelled with radiative transfer models. The dependence of Lyman-alpha (LyA) escape fractions on various properties were explored. All 12 GPs show LyA lines in emission, with a LyA equivalent width distribution similar to high-redshift emitters. Among the findings are that the LyA escape fraction depends strongly on metallicity and moderately on dust extinction. The papers results suggest that low H1 column density and low metallicity are essential for LyA escape. "In conclusion, GPs provide an unmatched opportunity to study LyA escape in LyA Emitters."

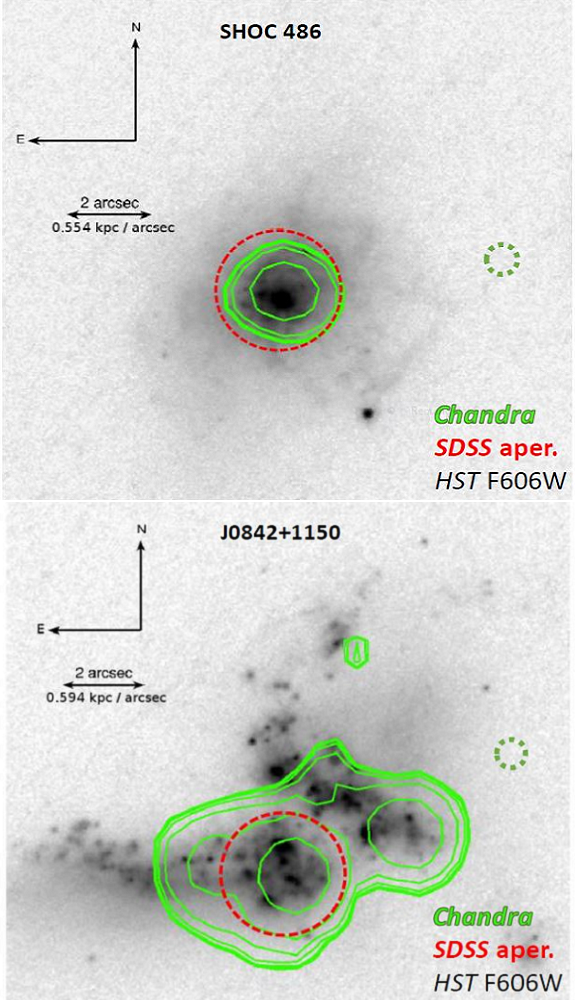
Combined images of J0842+1150 and SHOC 486 using Chandra x-ray and Hubble Space Telescope data. From Brorby and Kaaret AAS#229 2017

In a presentation to the AAS Meeting #229 in January 2017, Matt Brorby and Philip Kaaret describe the observations of two GPs and their x-ray emission. Using both space telescope programs Chandra GO: 16400764 and Hubble GO: 13940, they examine Luminous Compact Galaxies, both GPs, J0842+1150 and SHOC 486. They conclude: i) These are the first x-ray observations of GPs. ii) The two GPs studied are the first test of Lx-SFR-Z planar relation and that they are consistent with this. iii) Low-metallicity galaxies exhibit enhanced x-ray emission relative to normal metallicity starforming galaxies. iv) GPs are useful for predictions of X-ray output in the early universe.

In March 2017, Yang et al. published a paper in the ApJ called: "Lyα and UV Sizes of Green Pea Galaxies". The authors studied the Lyman-alpha (LyA) escape in a statistical sample of 43 GPs with HST/COS LyA spectra, taken from 6 HST programs. Their conclusions include: i) Using GPs that cover the whole ranges of dust extinction and metallicity, they find about two-thirds are strong LyA emitters. This confirms that GPs generally are "the best analogs of high-z (redshift) Lyman-alpha Emitters (LAEs) in the nearby universe." ii) The authors find many correlations regarding the dependence of LyA escape on galactic properties, such as dust extinction and metallicity. iii) The single shell radiative transfer model can reproduce most LyA profiles of GPs. iv) An empirical linear relation between the LyA escape fraction, dust extinction and the LyA red peak velocity.

In August 2017, Yang et al. published a study in the ApJ called: "Lyα profile, dust, and prediction of Lyα escape fraction in Green Pea Galaxies". The authors state that GPs are nearby analogues of high-redshift Lyman-alpha (LyA)- emitting galaxies. Using spectral data from the HST-COS MAST archive, 24 GPs were studied for their LyA escape and the spatial profiles of LyA and UV continuum emissions. Results include: i) Having compared LyA and UV sizes from the 2D spectra and 1D spatial profiles, it is found that most GPs show more extended LyA emission than the UV continuum. ii) 8 GPs had their spatial profiles of LyA photons at blueshifted and redshifted velocities compared. iii) The LyA escape fraction was compared with the size ration of LyA to UV. It was found that GPs that have LyA escape fractions greater than 10% "tend to have more compact LyA morphology".

In October 2017, Lofthouse et al. published a study in MNRAS named: The authors used integral field spectroscopy, from the SWIFT and Palm 3K instruments, to perform a spatially-resolved spectroscopic analysis of four GPs, numbered 1,2,4 and 5. Among the results are that GPs 1 & 2 are rotationally-supported (they have a rotating centre), while GPs 4 & 5 are dispersion-dominated systems. GPs 1 & 2 show morphologies indicative of ongoing or mergers. However, GPs 4 & 5 show no signs of recent interactions and have similar star-forming rates. This indicates mergers are not "a necessary requirement for driving the high star formation in these types of galaxies".

In December 2017, authors Jaskot et al. published a paper in the ApJ Letters titled:"Kinematics and Optical Depth in the Green Peas: Suppressed Superwinds in Candidate LyC Emitters". Within the paper, they say that current thinking describes how superwinds clear neutral gas away from young starburst galaxies, which in turn regulates the escape of Lyman continuum photons from star-forming galaxies. Models predict however that in the most extreme compact starbursts, those superwinds may not launch. The authors explore the role of outflows in generating low optical depth in GPs, using observations from the Hubble Space Telescope. They compare the kinematics of ultraviolet absorption and with Lyman alpha escape fraction, Lyman alpha peak separation or low-ionisation absorption. The most extreme GPs show the slowest velocities, which "are consistent with models for suppressed superwinds, which suggests that outflows may not be the only cause of LyC escape from galaxies."

=== 2021–2024 ===
In this study using images of peas taken as part of the Zoogems project, Leonardo Clarke et al. examine PG content to find out about the different ages of the stars and find that, while the central star-forming clusters were up to 500 million years old, there are stars, possibly the host galaxy stars, which are older and are thought to be more than 1 billion years old. Peas have been intensively studied as they are the only population that has hydrogen-ionizing radiation escaping in large amounts and so are substitutes for the earliest galaxies. Yet Clarke et al. argue the substantial presence of old stars would not have been possible at the earliest stages of the first galaxies. The mix of old and new stars within pea galaxies could create different gravitational conditions which might influence galactic winds and element retention. Their conclusions imply that pea galaxies are not real analogs of the galaxies responsible for the Epoch of Reionisation.

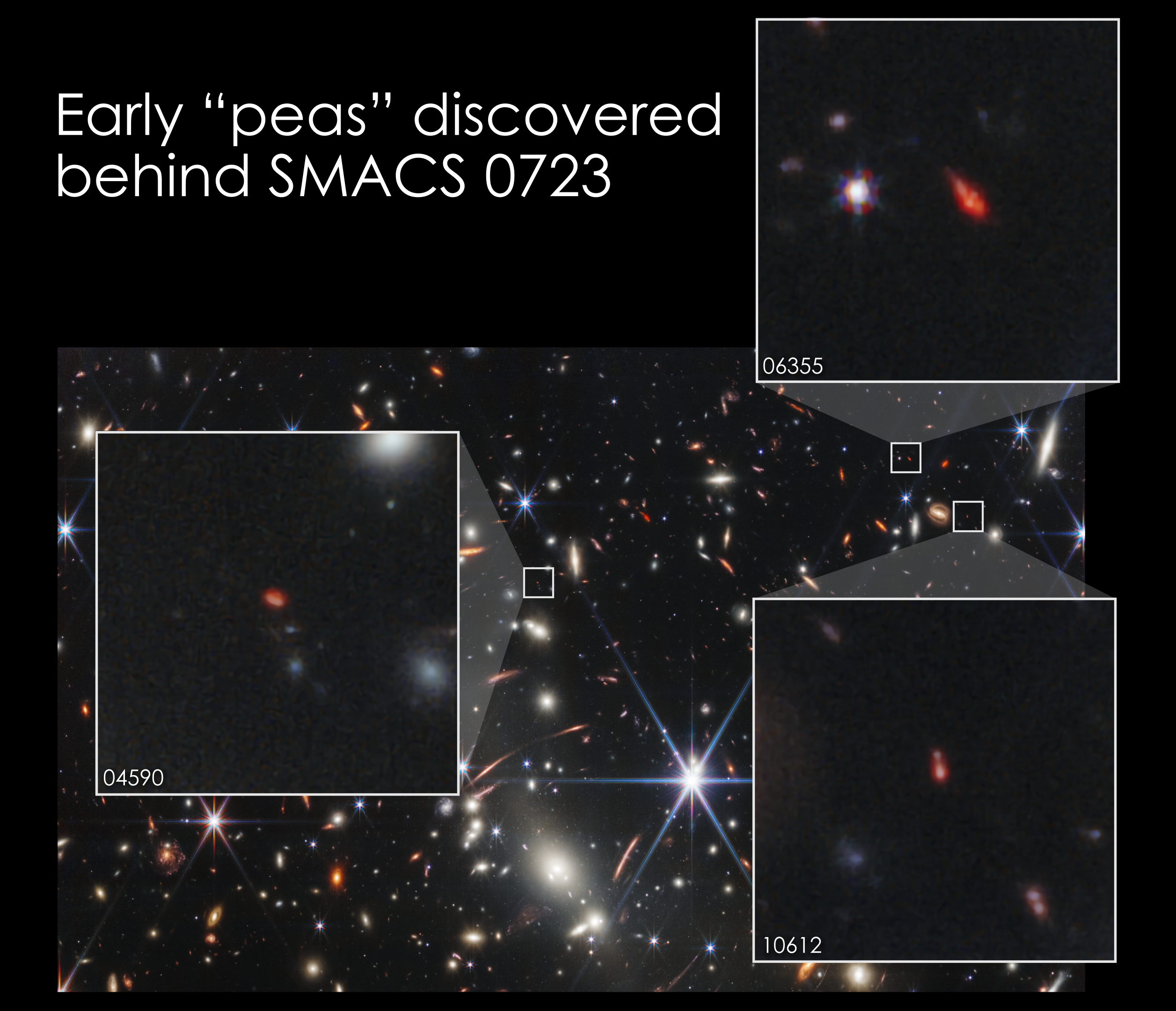
NASA's Webb Telescope Links Galaxies Near and Far (SVS14269 – early peas behind SMACS 0723 IDs 2160). Credit: NASA, ESA, CSA, and STScI

This study from January 2023 uses Early Release Observations from the James Webb Space Telescope to analyse the Near Infrared Spectrograph data of three galaxies at a redshift of z~8 to determine their metallicities, gas temperatures and ionisation. Using robust measurement procedures, the scientists compare the abundances and emission-line ratios to a nearby sample of green pea galaxies. JWST data shows further similarities between these GPs and the three high-redshift galaxies. These three galaxies show a compact morphology typical of emission-line-dominated galaxies at all redshifts and based on similarities with GPs, "it is likely that these are the first rest-optical spectra of galaxies that are actively driving cosmological reionization".

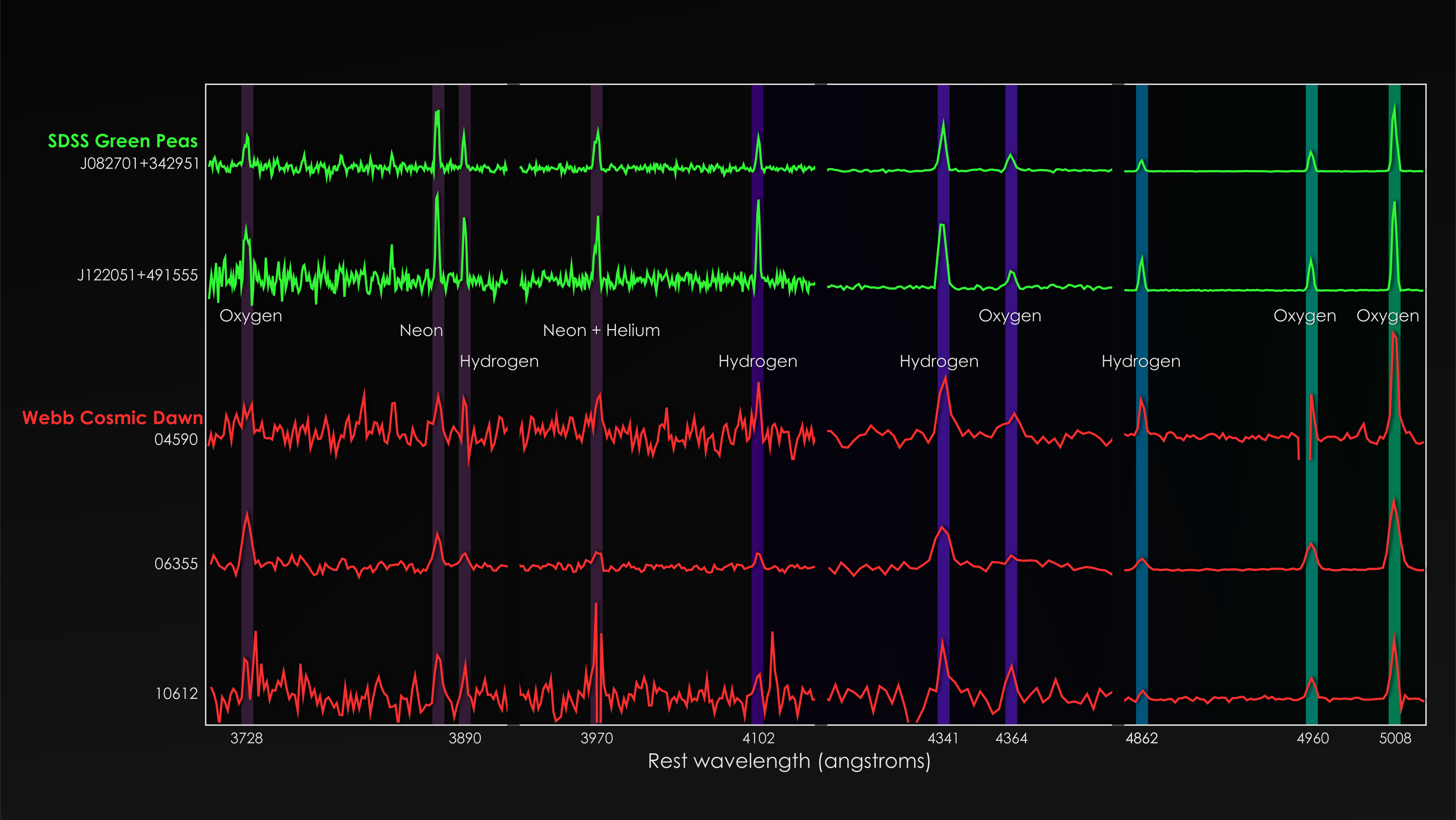
Comparison between 2 GPs' spectra as observed by SDSS and 3 early galaxies' spectra as observed by JWST. Credit: NASA's Goddard Space Flight Center/Rhoads et al. 2023

The JWST image used by Rhoads et al. is called SMACS 0723 and within it three galaxies that looked particularly far away were followed up using spectroscopic observations. This caught the attention of Rhoads et al. as the spectra of the three galaxies resembled GPs. Astronomer Trinh Thuan from the University of Virginia says he was amazed to see the similarity between the distant trio and GPs. Before JWST, the furthest GPs were measured at about 10 billion years after the Big Bang. Daniel Schaerer, an astronomer at the University of Geneva said that GPs can now be measured from only 700 million years after the Big Bang – "It's completely mind-boggling". As reported in Nature back in 2016, GPs are strong sources of ionizing radiation that are thought to be able to free the early universe from its 'dark ages'. Thuan said: "Now I really do think that these star-forming dwarf galaxies are the agent of reionization".

A study published in the ApJ by Bhat et al. in January 2024 investigates the influence of jets on GPs and Green Beans. Using 12 subjects selected from the SDSS and Radio Sky at 20 cm survey, the team use the Large Binocular Telescope–Multi-Object Double Spectrograph long-slit spectroscopy at two position angles for each galaxy: one aligned with the jet direction and another perpendicular to it. By tracing the [OIII] emission along these slits, the team aimed to assess the extension of the jets, which revealed that there was no preferred direction on the EELRs. When comparing the extension of [OIII] emission with that [OII], it was found that [OII] emission extended along a greater extension along the galactic plane, suggesting a stronger association of [OII] with stellar processes.

In the 2024 study "Ubiquitous broad-line emission and the relation between ionized gas outflows and Lyman continuum escape in Green Pea galaxies" R. Amorin et al. report evidence obtained by observations of ionized gas kinematics in a sample of 20 LyC emitters. These were made up of GPs from 3 different studies i) 14 from the Low-z Lyman Continuum (Flury et al. 2022a,b & Saldana-Lopez et al. 2022.) ii) 5 from Izotov et al. (2016a,b & 2018a) iii) 1 from Wang et al. (2021). A subsample of 13 spectra were obtained with the X-shooter instrument at the Very Large Telescope, while a subsample of 7 used spectra from the William Herschel Telescope's ISIS. Presenting new high-resolution optical spectra of 6 strong, 11 weak and 3 insignificant LyC leakers, they performed a first kinematic analysis of resolved emission-line profiles using multicomponent Gaussian fitting. They find a significant correlation between the intrinsic velocity dispersion and maximum line-width velocities of galaxies and their LyC escape fraction. Their results strongly suggest "that the physical mechanisms driving the observed kinematic complexity play a significant role in the escape of ionizing photons in galaxies."

== Blueberry galaxies ==
Blueberry galaxies (BBs) are fainter, less massive and lower distance counterparts of GPs. They are generally very small dwarf starburst galaxies that have very high ionisation rates and also have some of the lowest stellar masses and metallicities of starburst galaxies, although a massive BB has been studied. Two BBs are among the most metal-poor galaxies known, while the larger sample exist in low-density environments, similar to GPs. BBs are more compact than GPs being less than 1/3000 the size of the Milky Way. BBs form one of the youngest classes of star-forming galaxies with median ages ≤70 Myr. In 2011, Izotov and fellow authors wrote that GPs, BBs and 'Purple Grapes' were Luminous Compact Galaxies at different distances (see below).

While Huan (2017) identified a sample of 40 BBs, a much larger sample was acquired using data from the LAMOST DR9 survey. Siqi Liu and fellow authors found 270 BBs, as well as GPs and purple grapes. The observations found 1,417 new compact galaxies, nearly twice as many as formerly known. Researchers undertook a systematic study of the star formation rates, metallicities and environments of the compact galaxies that have different colours because of the different positions of emission lines in the photometric bands.

== Little red dots ==
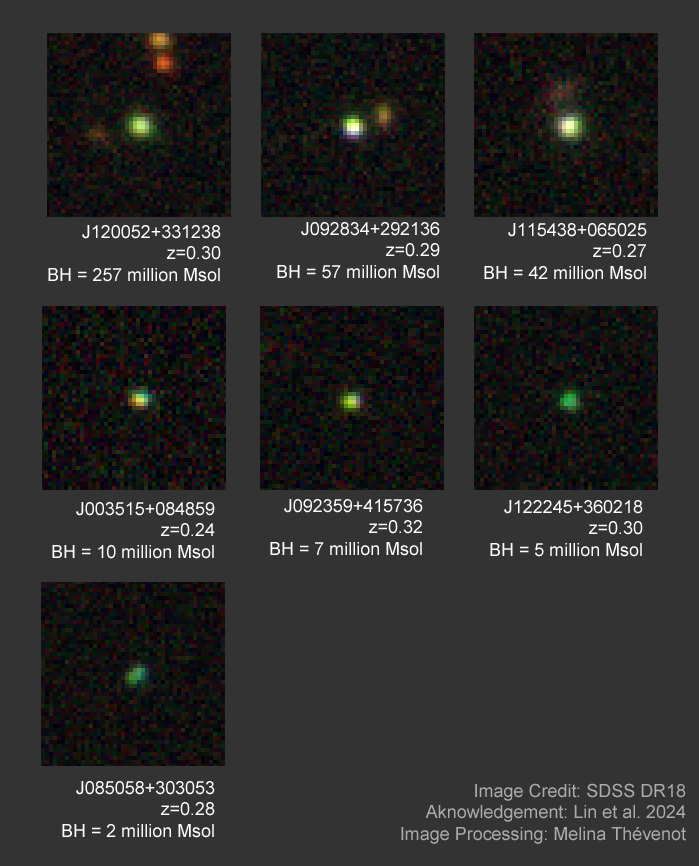
V-shaped broad-line GPs (local little red dots)

Recent observations by the JWST have revealed a population of small red galaxies known as little red dots (LRD) that exist between 600 million years and 1.5 billion years after the Big Bang . It is thought that these objects have AGN within them caused by supermassive black holes, though other theories exist.

A study published in the ApJ letters by Ruqiu Lin et al. (2025) link LRDs to GPs. Using data gathered from previous work, Lin et al. theorise local analog GPs that host broad-line AGNs (BLGPs) are similar to LRDs. These galaxies with 'over massive' black holes have spectra similar to that found with LRDs. They conclude: "GPs provide a local subsample that can be considered analogs to LRDs and high-z broad-line AGNs. Combined with follow-up observation, including spectroscopic and imaging observations with high sensitivity and high spatial resolution in the UV and optical bands, this V-shaped BLGP sample can help to address several unclear questions for LRDs, such as the UV emission origin."

== J0925+1403 and LyC leakage ==
In January 2016, a letter was published in the journal Nature called: "Eight per cent leakage of Lyman continuum photons from a compact, star-forming dwarf galaxy" by authors Y.I. Izotov et al. which was a result of observations carried out using the COS aboard the HST. The abstract states: "One of the key questions in observational cosmology is the identification of the sources responsible for ionisation of the Universe after the cosmic Dark Ages". It also states: "Here we present far-ultraviolet observations of a nearby low-mass star-forming galaxy, J0925+1403, selected for its compactness and high excitation... The galaxy is 'leaking' ionising radiation, with an escape fraction of 7.8%." These levels of radiation are thought to be similar to those of the first galaxies in the universe, which emerged in a time known as reionization. These findings have led the research team to conclude that J0925 can ionise intergalactic material up to 40 times its own stellar mass.

GP J0925 is thought to be similar to the most distant, and thus earliest, galaxies in the universe and has been shown to 'leak' LyC. It is about 3 billion light years away (redshift z=0.301), or approximately 75% of the current age of the universe. Co-author Trinh Thuan said that i) The finding is significant because it gives us a good place to look for probing the reionization phenomenon, which took place early in the formation of the universe that became the universe we have today, ii) As we make additional observations using Hubble, we expect to gain a much better understanding of the way photons are ejected from this type of galaxy, and the specific galaxy types driving cosmic reionization, and iii) These are crucial observations in the process of stepping back in time to the early universe.

=== LyC detection in J1152+3400, J1333+6246, J1442-0209, J1503+3644 ===
In October 2016, a study was published in the MNRAS entitled: "Detection of high Lyman continuum leakage from four low-redshift compact star-forming galaxies". Its authors are Y. I. Izotov et al. The abstract states: "Following our first detection reported in Izotov et al. (2016) [as above], we present the detection of Lyman continuum (LyC) radiation of four other compact star-forming galaxies observed with the Cosmic Origins Spectrograph (COS) onboard the Hubble Space Telescope (HST)".

This study contains the methods and findings from Izotov et al. 2016 (a) which concentrated on one galaxy, whereas the above paper, Izotov et al. 2016 (b) has findings for four galaxies, all of which have LyC leakage. When compared with other known local galaxies that leak LyC, as listed in this article, Izotov et al. 2016 (a & b) doubled the numbers of known leakers.

== Lyman alpha emission ==
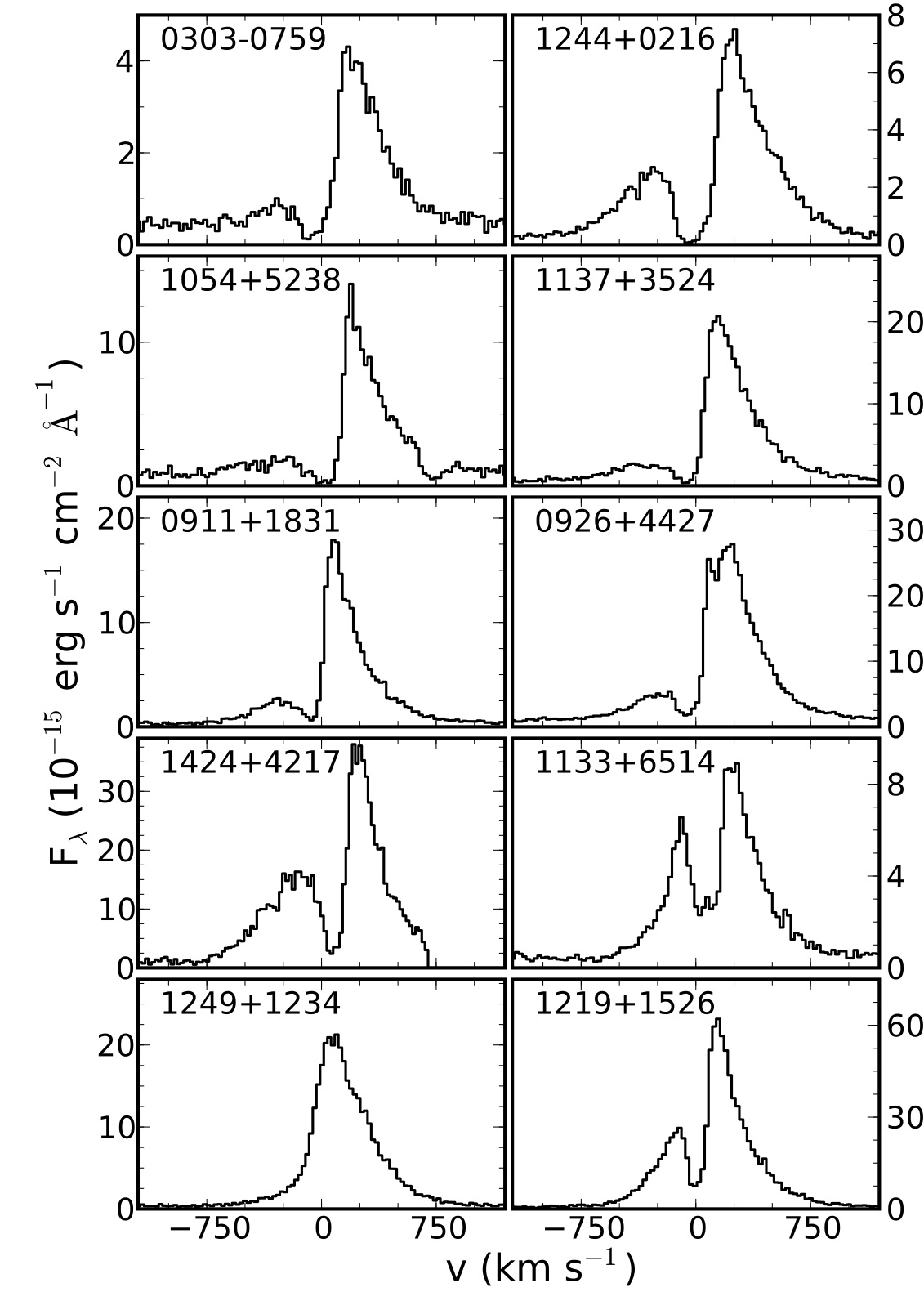
GP spectra indicating the resonant scattering of Lyα photons

In May 2015, authors Alaina Henry et al. published a paper titled: "Lyα Emission from Green Peas: The Role of Circumgalactic Gas Density, Covering, and Kinematics". The motivation of this work was to understand why some galaxies have Lyα emission, while others don't. A host of physical conditions in galaxies regulate the output of this spectral feature; hence, understanding its emission is fundamentally important for understanding how galaxies form and how they impact their intergalactic surroundings.

Henry et al. hypothesized that, since the GPs seem more like galaxies at redshift=z>2, and Lyα is common at these redshifts, that Lyα would be common in the GPs as well. Observations with the HST using the COS, as in 'Description', proved this to be true for a sample of 10 GPs. The spectra, shown here to the right, indicate resonant scattering of Lyα photons that are emitted near zero velocity. The wealth of data existing on the GPs, combined with the COS spectra, allowed Henry et al. to explore the physical mechanisms that regulate the Lyα output. These authors concluded that variations in the amount of neutral hydrogen gas, which scatters Lyα photons, are the cause of a factor of 10 difference in Lyα output in their sample.

The spectrum of GP J1219 (an image of which is in 'Description') shows its very strong flux measurements when compared to other 9 GPs. Indeed, only GP J1214 has a value approaching that of J1219. Note also the double peaks in some GPs and the velocity values of the emissions, indicating the inflow and outflow of matter in the GPs.

== Papers by A. Jaskot and M.S. Oey ==
In April 2013, authors A. Jaskot and M. Oey published a paper in ApJ titled "The Origin and Optical Depth of Ionizing Radiation in the "Green Pea" Galaxies". Six "extreme" GPs are studied. Using these, they endeavour to narrow down the list of possibilities about what is producing the UV-radiation and the substantial amounts of high-energy photon that might be escaping from the GPs. Through trying to observe these photons in nearby galaxies such as the GPs, our understanding of how galaxies behaved in the early Universe might well be revolutionised. It is reported that the GPs are exciting candidates to help astronomers understand a major milestone in the development of the cosmos 13 billion years ago, during the epoch of reionization.

In February 2014, authors A. Jaskot and M. Oey published a conference report titled "The Origin and Optical Depth of Ionizing Photons in the Green Pea Galaxies". This will appear in "Massive Young Star Clusters Near and Far: From the Milky Way to Reionization", based on the 2013 Guillermo Haro Conference. In the publication, Jaskot and Oey write: "We are currently analyzing observations from IMACS and MagE on the Magellan Telescopes and COS and ACS on Hubble Space Telescope (HST) to distinguish between WR (Wolf-Rayet star) and the shock ionization scenarios and confirm the GPs' optical depths. The absence of WR features in the deeper IMACS spectra tentatively supports the shock scenario, although the detection limits do not yet definitively rule out the WR photoionization hypothesis."

== Physics from the Cardamone 2009 paper ==
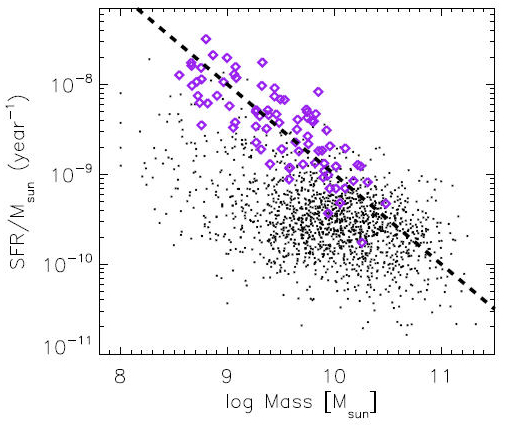
Graph showing specific star formation rate plotted against galaxy mass, with the GPs (purple diamonds) and the Galaxy Zoo Merger Sample (black points)

At the time this paper was published, only five green peas (GPs) had been imaged by the Hubble Space Telescope (HST). Three of these images reveal GPs to be made up of bright clumps of star formation and low surface density features indicative of recent or ongoing galaxy mergers. These three HST images were imaged as part of a study of local ultraviolet (UV-luminous) galaxies in 2005. Major mergers are frequently sites of active star-formation and to the right a graph is shown that plots specific star formation rate (SFR / galaxy mass) against galaxy mass. In this graph, the GPs are compared to the 3003 mergers from the Galaxy Zoo Merger Sample (GZMS). It shows that the GPs have low masses typical of dwarf galaxy and much higher star-forming rates (SFR) when compared to the GZMS. The black, dashed line shows a constant SFR of 10 M_{☉}/yr (~10 solar masses). Most GPs have a SFR between 3 and 30 M_{☉}/yr (between ~3 and ~30 solar masses).

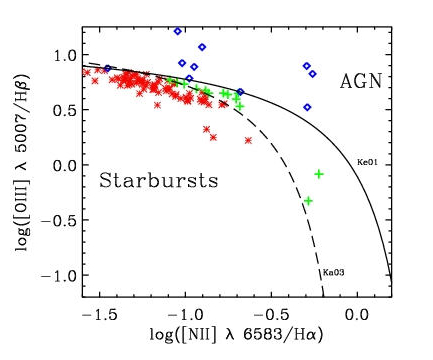
Graph showing 103 GPs plotted as starburst galaxies (red stars), transition objects (green crosses) or A.G.N. (blue diamonds)

GPs are rare. Of the one million objects that make up GZ's image bank, only 251 GPs were found. After having to discard 148 of these 251 because of atmospheric contamination of their stellar spectra, the 103 that were left, with the highest signal-to-noise ratio, were analyzed further using the classic emission line diagnostic by Baldwin, Phillips and Terlevich which separates starbursts and active galactic nuclei. 80 were found to be starburst galaxies. The graph to the left classifies 103 narrow-line GPs (all with SNR ≥ 3 in the emission lines) as 10 active galactic nuclei (blue diamonds), 13 transition objects (green crosses) and 80 starbursts (red stars). The solid line is: Kewley et al. (2001) maximal starburst contribution (labelled Ke01). The dashed line is: Kauffmann et al. (2003) separating purely star-forming objects from AGN (labelled Ka03).

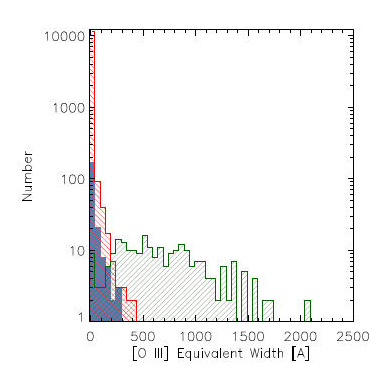
Histogram showing [OIII] Eq.Wth. of 10,000 comparison galaxies (red); 215 UV-luminous galaxies (blue); GPs (green)

GPs have a strong [OIII] emission line when compared to the rest of their spectral continuum. In a SDSS spectrum, this shows up as a large peak with [OIII] at the top. The wavelength of [OIII] (500.7 nm) was chosen to determine the luminosities of the GPs using equivalent width (Eq.Wth.). The histogram on the right shows on the horizontal scale the Eq.Wth. of a comparison of 10,000 normal galaxies (marked red), UV-luminous galaxies (marked blue) and GPs (marked green). As can be seen from the histogram, the Eq.Wth. of the GPs is much larger than normal for even prolific starburst galaxies such as UV-luminous galaxies.

Within the Cardamone et al. paper, comparisons are made with other compact galaxies, namely blue compact dwarfs galaxies and UV-luminous galaxies, at local and much higher distances. The findings show that GPs form a different class of galaxies than ultra blue compact dwarfs, but may be similar to the most luminous members of the blue compact dwarf galaxy category. The GPs are also similar to UV-luminous high-redshift galaxies such as Lyman-break galaxies and Lyman-alpha emitters. It is concluded that if the underlying processes occurring in the GPs are similar to that found in the UV-luminous high-redshift galaxies, the GPs may be the last remnants of a mode of star formation common in the early Universe.

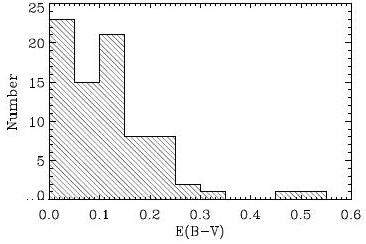
Histogram showing reddening values for GPs

GPs have low interstellar reddening values, as shown in the histogram on the right, with nearly all GPs having E(B−V) ≤ 0.25. The distribution shown indicates that the line-emitting regions of star-forming GPs are not highly reddened, particularly when compared to more typical star-forming or starburst galaxies. This low reddening combined with very high UV luminosity is rare in galaxies in the local Universe and is more typically found in galaxies at higher redshifts.

Cardamone et al. describe GPs as having a low metallicity, but that the oxygen present is highly ionized. The average GP has a metallicity of log[O/H]+12~8.69, which is solar or sub-solar, depending on which set of standard values is used. Although the GPs are in general consistent with the mass-metallicity relation, they depart from it at the highest mass end and thus do not follow the trend. GPs have a range of masses, but a more uniform metallicity than the sample compared against. These metallicities are common in low-mass galaxies such as peas.

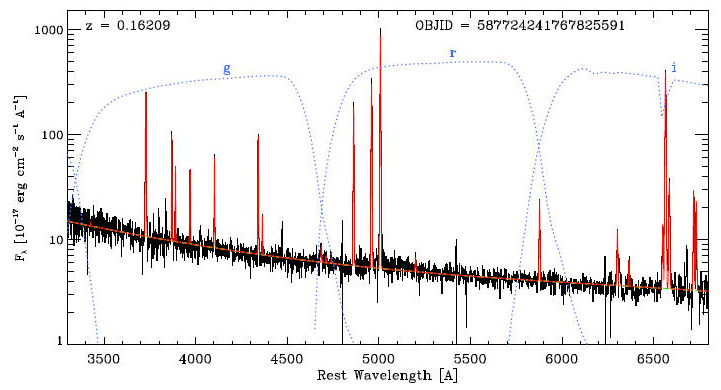
An example of a GP spectrum made using GANDALF

As well as the optical images from the SDSS, measurements from the GALEX survey were used to determine the ultraviolet values. This survey is well matched in depth and area, and 139 of the sampled 251 GPs are found in GALEX Release 4 (G.R.4). For the 56 of the 80 star-forming GPs with GALEX detections, the median luminosity is ~30,000 million $L_{\odot}$ (~30,000 million solar luminosities).

When compiling the Cardamone paper, spectral classification was made using Gas And Absorption Line Fitting (GANDALF). This sophisticated computer software was programmed by Marc Sarzi, who helped analyze the SDSS spectra.

== Analysis of the Cardamone 2009 paper ==
These values are from Table 4, pages 16–17 of Cardamone 2009 et al., which shows the 80 GPs that have been analysed here. The long 18-digit numbers are the SDSS DR7 reference numbers.

	Greatest	Least	Average	Nearest to Average
Distance	z=0.348 (587732134315425958)	z=0.141 (587738947196944678)	z=0.2583	z=0.261 (587724240158589061)
Mass	10^{10.48} M_{☉} (588023240745943289)	10^{8.55} M_{☉} (587741392649781464)	10^{9.48} M_{☉}	10^{9.48} M_{☉} (587724241767825591)
Rate of star-forming	59 M_{☉}/yr (587728906099687546)	2 M_{☉}/yr (588018090541842668)	13.02 M_{☉}/yr	13 M_{☉}/yr (588011122502336742)
Luminosity ([OIII] Eq.Wth.)	238.83 nm (587738410863493299)	1.2 nm (587741391573287017)	69.4 nm	67.4 nm (588018090541842668)
Luminosity (UV)	36.1×10^{36} W (587733080270569500)	1.9×10^{36} W (588848899919446344)	12.36×10^{36} W	12.3×10^{36} W (588018055652769997)

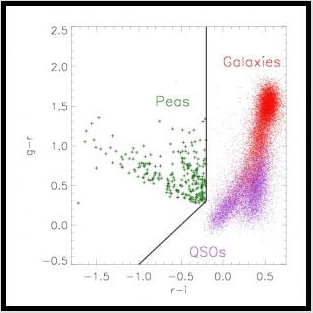
r−i vs. g−r color-color diagram for 251 GPs (green crosses), a sample of normal galaxies (red points) and all quasar (purple points)

Color selection was by using the difference in the levels of three optical filters, in order to capture these color limits: u−r ≤ 2.5 (1), r−i ≤ −0.2 (2), r−z ≤ 0.5 (3), g−r ≥ r−i + 0.5 (4), u−r ≥ 2.5 (r−z) (5). If the diagram on the right (one of two in the paper) is looked at, the effectiveness of this color selection can be seen. The color-color diagram shows ~100 GPs (green crosses), 10,000 comparison galaxies (red points) and 9,500 comparison quasar (purple stars) at similar redshifts to the GPs. The black lines show how these figures are on the diagram.

Comparing a GP to the Milky Way can be useful when trying to visualize these star-forming rates. An average GP has a mass of ~3,200 million M_{☉} (~3,200 million solar masses). The Milky Way (MW) is a spiral galaxy and has a mass of ~1,125,000, million M_{☉} (~1,125,000 million solar masses). So the MW has the mass of ~390 GPs.

Research has shown that the MW converts ~2 M_{☉}/yr (~2 solar masses per year) worth of interstellar medium into stars. An average GP converts ~10 M_{☉}/yr (~10 solar masses) of interstellar gas into stars, which is ~5 times the rate of the MW.

One of the original ways of recognizing GPs, before SQL programming was involved, was because of a discrepancy about how the SDSS labels them within Skyserver. Out of the 251 of the original GP sample that were identified by the SDSS spectroscopic pipeline as having galaxy spectra, only 7 were targeted by the SDSS spectral fibre allocation as galaxies i.e. 244 were not.

== Later studies ==
In June 2010, authors R. Amorín et al. published a paper in ApJ letters titled "On the Oxygen and Nitrogen Chemical Abundances and the Evolution of the "Green Pea" Galaxies", which disputes the metallicities calculated in the original Cardamone et al. GPs paper Amorin et al. use a different methodology from Cardamone et al. to produce metallicity values more than one fifth (20%) of the previous values (about 20% solar or one fifth solar) for the 80 'starburst' GPs. These mean values are log[O/H]+12~8.05, which shows a clear offset of 0.65dex between the two papers' values. For these 80 GPs, Amorin et al., using a direct method, rather than strong-line methods as used in Cardamone et al., calculate physical properties, as well as oxygen and nitrogen ionic abundances. These metals pollute hydrogen and helium, which make up the majority of the substances present in galaxies. As these metals are produced in supernovae, the more recent a galaxy is, the fewer metals it would have. As GPs are in the nearby, or recent, Universe, they should have more metals than galaxies at an earlier time.

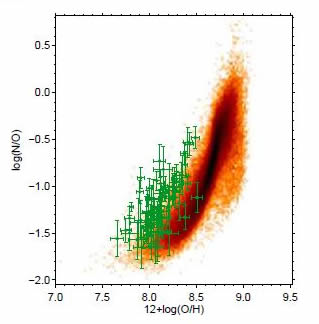
N/O vs. O/H abundance ratio

Amorin et al. find that the amount of metals, including the abundance of nitrogen, is different from normal values and that GPs are not consistent with the mass-metallicity relation, as concluded by Cardamone et al. This analysis indicates that GPs can be considered as genuine metal-poor galaxies. They then argue that this oxygen under-abundance is due to a recent interaction-induced inflow of gas, possibly coupled with a selective metal-rich gas loss driven by supernovae winds and that this can explain their findings. This further suggests that GPs are likely very short-lived as the intense star formation in them would quickly enrich the gas.

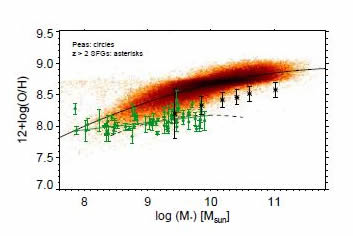
O/H vs. stellar mass

In May 2011, R.Amorin et al. published a conference proceeding paper titled "Unveiling the Nature of the "Green Pea" galaxies". In it they review recent scientific results and announcing a forthcoming paper on their recent observations at the Gran Telescopio Canarias. They conclude that GPs are a genuine population of metal-poor, luminous and very compact starburst galaxies. Amongst the data, five graphs illustrate the findings they have made. Amorin et al. use masses calculated by Izotov, rather than by Cardamone. The metallicities that Amorin et al. use agree with Izotov's findings, or vice versa, rather than Cardamone's.

The first graph (on the left; fig.1 in paper) plots the nitrogen/oxygen vs. oxygen/hydrogen abundance ratio. The 2D histogram of SDSS star forming galaxies is shown in logarithmic scale while the GPs are indicated by circles. This shows that GPs are metal-poor.

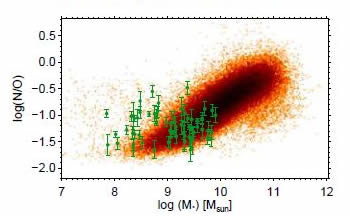
N/O vs. stellar mass

The second graph (on the right; fig.2 in paper) plots O/H vs. stellar mass. The 2D histogram of SDSS SFGs is shown in logarithmic scale and their best likelihood fit is shown by a black solid line. The subset of 62 GPs are indicated by circles and their best linear fit is shown by a dashed line. For comparison we also show the quadratic fit presented in Amorin et al. 2010 for the full sample of 80 GPs. SFGs at z ≥ 2 by Erb et al. are also shown by asterisks for comparison.

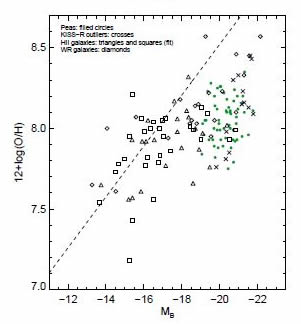
O/H vs. B-band (rest-frame) absolute magnitude

The third graph (on the left; fig.3 in paper) plots N/O vs. stellar mass. Symbols as in fig.1.

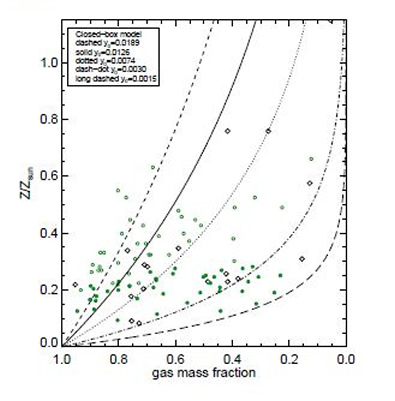
Gas mass fraction v. metallicity

The fourth graph (on the right; fig.4 in paper) plots O/H vs. B-band (rest-frame) absolute magnitude. The meaning of symbols is indicated. Distances used in computing (extinction corrected) absolute magnitudes were, in all cases, calculated using spectroscopic redshifts and the same cosmological parameters. The dashed line indicates the fit to the HII galaxies in the luminosity-metallicity relationship (MZR) given by Lee et al. 2004.

The fifth graph (on the left; fig.5 in paper) plots gas mass fraction vs. metallicity. Different lines correspond to closed-box models at different yields, as indicated in the legend. Open and filled circles are GPs that are above and below the fit to their MZR. Diamonds are values for the same Wolf-Rayet galaxies as in Fig. 4.

== GTC-OSIRIS spectrophotometry ==
In February 2012, authors R. Amorin et al. published a paper titled "The star formation history and metal content of the green peas". New detailed GTC-OSIRIS spectrophotometry of three galaxies" in which they presented the findings of observations carried out using the Gran Telescopio Canarias at the Roque de los Muchachos Observatory. They gather deep broad-band imaging and long-slit spectroscopy of 3 GPs using high-precision equipment.

Their findings show that the three GPs display relatively low extinction, low oxygen abundances and high nitrogen-to-oxygen ratios. Also reported are the clear signatures of Wolf–Rayet stars, of which a population are found (between ~800 and ~1200). A combination of population and evolutionary synthesis models strongly suggest a formation history dominated by starbursts. These models show that these three GPs currently undergo a major starburst producing between ~4% and ~20% of their stellar mass. However, as these models imply, they are old galaxies having formed most of their stellar mass several billion years ago. The presence of old stars has been spectroscopically verified in one of the three galaxies by the detection of magnesium. Surface photometry, using data from the Hubble Space Telescope archive, indicates that the three GPs possess an exponential low surface brightness envelope (see Low-surface-brightness galaxy). This suggests that GPs are identifiable with major episodes in the assembly history of local blue compact dwarf galaxies.

The three galaxies are (using SDSS references):

- 587724199349387411
- 587729155743875234
- 587731187273892048

== Comparison to luminous compact galaxies ==
In February 2011, Izotov et al. published a paper titled "Green Pea Galaxies and Cohorts: Luminous Compact Emission-line Galaxies in the Sloan Digital Sky Survey", examining the GPs and comparing these to a larger set of 803 Luminous Compact Galaxies (LCGs). They use a different set of selection criteria from Cardamone et al. These are: a) a high extinction-corrected luminosity > 3×10^{40} ergs/s of the hydrogen beta emission line; (see hydrogen spectral series) b) a high equivalent width greater than 5 nm; c) a strong [OIII] wavelength at the 436.3 nm emission line allowing accurate abundance determination; d) a compact structure on SDSS images; and e) an absence of obvious active galactic nuclei spectroscopic features.

Its conclusions (shortened) are:

1. The selected galaxies have redshifts between 0.02 and 0.63, a range equal or greater than a factor of 2 when compared to the GPs. They find the properties of LCGs and GPs are similar to blue compact dwarf galaxies. Explaining how the colours of emission-line galaxies change with distance using SDSS, they conclude that GPs are just subsamples within a narrow redshift range of their larger LCG sample.
2. Although there were no upper limits on the hydrogen beta luminosities, it was found that there was a 'self-regulating' mechanism which bound the LCGs to a limit of ~3×10^{42} ergs/s.
3. In the [OIII] wavelength 500.7 nm ratio to hydrogen beta vs. [NII] wavelength 658.3 nm ratio to hydrogen alpha, LCGs occupy the region, in the diagnostic diagram, of star-forming galaxies with the highest excitation. However, some active galactic nuclei also lie in this region in the diagnostic diagram.
4. The oxygen abundances 12 + log O/H in LCGs are in the range 7.6–8.4 with a median value of ~8.11, confirming Amorin et al.'s analysis of a subset of GPs. This range of oxygen abundances is typical of nearby lower-luminosity blue compact dwarfs. These results show that the original Cardamone et al. median oxygen abundance of 12 + log O/H = ~8.7 is overestimated, as a different, empirical method was originally used, rather than the direct method by Amorin et al. and Izotov et al. There is no dependence of oxygen abundance on redshift.
5. In the luminosity-metallicity diagram (fig. 8 in paper), LCGs are shifted by ~2 magnitudes brighter when compared to nearby emission-line galaxies. LCGs form a common luminosity-metallicity relation, as for the most actively star-forming galaxies. Some LCGs have oxygen abundances and luminosities similar to Lyman-break galaxies (LBGs), despite much lower redshifts, thus enabling the study of LBGs through LCGs.

== Radio detection ==
=== Chakraborti et al. ===
In February 2012, authors Sayan et al. published a paper titled "Radio Detection of Green Peas: Implications for Magnetic Fields in Young Galaxies" which deals with the magnetic properties of the GPs. In it, they describe observations which have produced some unexpected results raising puzzling questions about the origin and evolution of magnetism in young galaxies. The ages are estimated from looking at the star formation that the GPs currently have ongoing and then estimating the age of the most recent starburst. GPs are very young galaxies, with models of the observed stellar populations indicating that they are around 10^8 (one hundred million) years old (1/100 the age of the Milky Way). There is some question as to whether the GPs all started from the same starburst or if multiple starbursts went on (much older stellar populations are hidden as we can't see the light from these).

Using data from the Giant Metrewave Radio Telescope (GMRT) and archive observations from the Karl G. Jansky Very Large Array (VLA), Chakraborti et al. produced a set of results which are based around the VLA FIRST detection of stacked flux from 32 GPs and three 3-hour low-frequency observations from the GMRT which targeted the three most promising candidates which had expected fluxes at the milli-Jansky (mJy) level.

Chakraborti et al. find that the three GPs observed by the GMRT have a magnetic field of B~39 μG, and more generally a figure of greater than B~30μG for all the GPs. This is compared to a figure of B~5μG for the Milky Way. The present understanding is of magnetic field growth based on the amplification of seed fields by dynamo theory and its action over a galaxy's lifetime. The observations of GPs challenge that thinking.

=== Others ===
In 2021, Kanekar et al. reported the first detection of HI 21 cm line emission in 19 GPs using the Green Bank Telescope and Arecibo Observatory. Their results give the first estimates of atomic gas mass in Green Pea galaxies.

In a study "Radio properties of green pea galaxies", authors Borkar et al. examine the radio properties of GPs using the Jansky Very Large Array. They observe 3 GPs to build their radio spectral energy distributions to verify the presence of AGN. Using new and archival data from both GPs and Blueberry galaxies, they assess the detectability of these sources, comparing radio luminosities with expectations from theoretical and empirical relations. They find that the majority of the sampled dwarf galaxies are highly underluminous and that their radio luminosity is significantly lower than empirical expectations.

== See also ==
- Blue compact dwarf galaxy – Small galaxy composed of up to several billion stars
- Dwarf galaxy – Small galaxy composed of up to several billion stars
- Galaxy formation and evolution – Subfield of cosmology
- Green bean galaxy – Very rare astronomical objects that are thought to be quasar ionization echos
- Haro 11 – Galaxy in the constellation Sculptor – One of nine galaxies shown to leak Lyman Continuum photons
- List of galaxies
- Reinventing Discovery – Book on the benefits of applying the philosophy of open science to research
- Tololo 1247-232 – Galaxy in the constellation Hydra – One of nine galaxies shown to 'leak' Lyman continuum photons
- Ultraviolet astronomy – Observation of electromagnetic radiation at ultraviolet wavelengths
