= GLEAM J0917−0012 =

Potential farthest radio galaxy with young and powerful jets

Observation data
- Constellation: Hydra
- Right ascension: 09^{h} 17^{m} 34.42^{s}
- Declination: −00° 12′ 42.5″
- Redshift: 2-8 (likely 7)

Characteristics
- Type: Radio galaxy
- Notable features: Potentially that most distant radio galaxy with a young but powerful jet quenching star formation

GLEAM J0917−0012 is a candidate radio galaxy located at the constellation Hydra with a ultra-high uncertain redshift distances. It could exist somewhere between redshift distances of z=2 to z=8, potentially making it the most distant radio galaxy. The most likely distance seems to be around redshift z=7. For reference, the farthest confirmed radio galaxy is located at the constellation Serpens with a redshift of z=5.72 and it's named TGSS J1530+1049.

== Jet ==
The jet of GLEAM J0917−0012 is only around 50,000 years old, making it one of the youngest jets in the universe's cosmic noon. It is also very powerful, being one of the most powerful jets discovered in the cosmic noon. This jet is speculated to be on its way to quenching star formation in the galaxy. The jet is being produced by a large black hole with a mass tentatively placed with a mass of 10^9 or one billion solar masses.
