= Reionization =

Cosmological process in the early universe

Nature timeline
← / Earliest stars; ← / Earliest galaxy; ← / Earliest quasar / black hole; ← / Omega Centauri; ← / Andromeda Galaxy; ← / Milky Way spirals; ← / NGC 188 star cluster; ← / Alpha Centauri; ← / Accelerated expansion; ← / Earth / Solar System; ← / Earliest known life; ← / Atmospheric oxygen; ← / Sexual reproduction; ← / Earliest fungi; ← / Earliest land plants; ← / Cambrian explosion; ← / Earliest mammals; ← / Earliest apes / humans
(billion years ago)

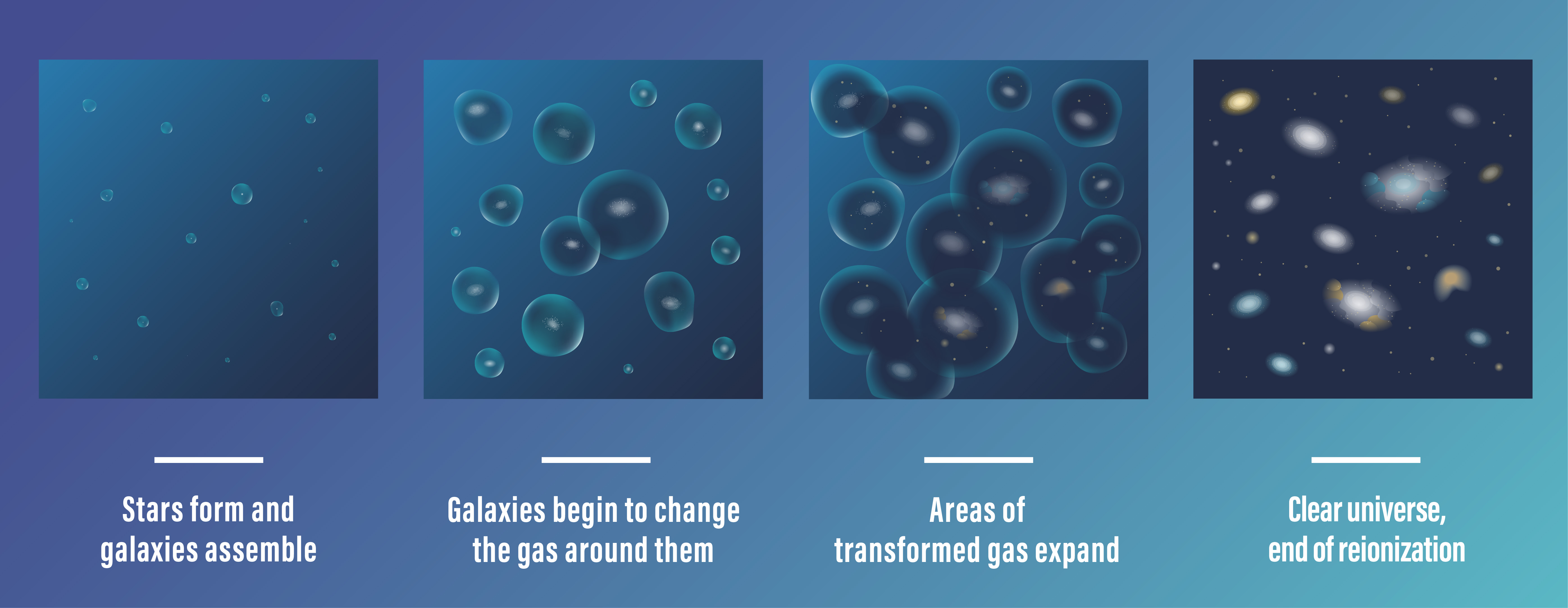
Phases of the reionization

In the fields of Big Bang theory and cosmology, reionization is the process that caused electrically neutral atoms in the primordial universe to reionize after the lapse of the "dark ages". Detecting and studying the reionization process is challenging but multiple avenues have been pursued. This reionization was driven by the formation of the first stars and galaxies.

== Concept ==
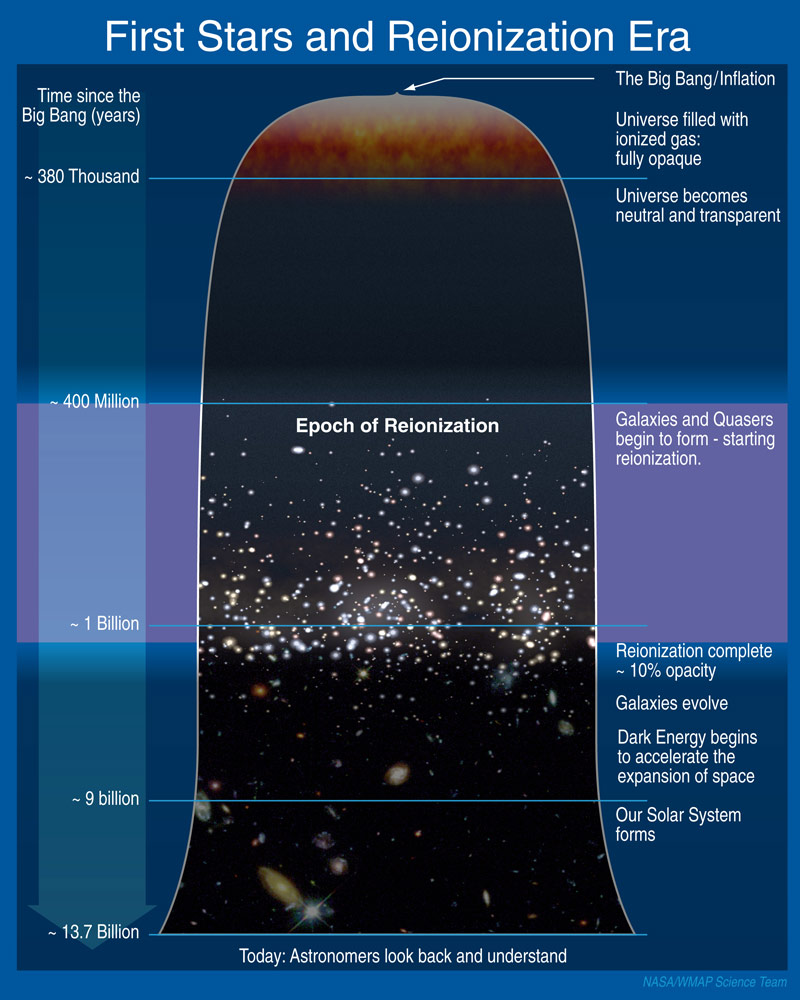
Schematic timeline of the universe, depicting reionization's place in cosmic history.

Reionization refers to a change in the intergalactic medium from neutral hydrogen to ions. The neutral hydrogen had been ions at an earlier stage in the history of the universe, thus the conversion back into ions is termed a reionization. The reionization was driven by energetic photons emitted by the first stars and galaxies.

In the timeline of the universe, neutral hydrogen gas was originally formed when primordial hydrogen nuclei (protons) combined with electrons. Light with sufficient energy will ionize neutral hydrogen gas. At early times, light was so dense and energetic that hydrogen atoms would be immediately re-ionized. As the universe expanded and cooled, the rate of recombination of electrons and protons to form neutral hydrogen was higher than the ionization rate. At around 379,000 years after the Big Bang (redshift z = 1089), this recombination left most normal matter in the form of neutral hydrogen.

The universe was opaque before the recombination, due to the scattering of photons of all wavelengths off free electrons (and free protons, to a significantly lesser extent), but it became increasingly transparent as more electrons and protons combined to form neutral hydrogen atoms. While the electrons of neutral hydrogen can absorb photons of some wavelengths by rising to an excited state, a universe full of neutral hydrogen will be relatively opaque only at those few wavelengths. The remaining light could travel freely and become the cosmic microwave background radiation. The only other light at this point would be provided by those excited hydrogen atoms, marking the beginning of an era called the Dark Ages of the universe.

The second phase change occurred once objects started to form in the early universe emitting radiation energetic enough to re-ionize neutral hydrogen. As these objects formed and radiated energy, the universe reverted from being composed of neutral atoms, to once again being an ionized plasma. This occurred between 150 million and one billion years after the Big Bang (at a redshift 20 > z > 6) At that time, however, matter had been diffused by the expansion of the universe, and the scattering interactions of photons and electrons were much less frequent than before electron-proton recombination. Thus, the universe was full of low density ionized hydrogen and remained transparent, as is the case today.

It is believed that the primordial helium also experienced a similar reionization phase change, but at a later epoch in the history of the universe.

== Stages ==
Theoretical models give a timeline of the reionization process. In the first stage of reionization, each new star is surrounded by neutral hydrogen. Light emitted by the star ionizes gas immediately around the star. Then light can reach further out to ionize gas. The ions can recombine, competing with the ionization process. The ionized gas will be hot and it will expand, clearing out the region around the star. The sphere of ionized gas expands until the amount of light from the star that can cause ionizations balances the recombination, a process that takes hundreds of millions of years. (The time is so long that stars die before the full extent of the reionization completes for that star.) At some point the shell of ionization from each star in a galaxy begin to overlap and the ionization frontier pushes out into the intergalactic medium.

== Detection methods ==
Looking back so far in the history of the universe presents some observational challenges. There are, however, a few observational methods for studying reionization.

=== Quasars and the Gunn-Peterson trough ===
One means of studying reionization uses the spectra of distant quasars. Quasars release an extraordinary amount of energy, being among the brightest objects in the universe. As a result, some quasars are detectable from as long ago as the epoch of reionization. Quasars also happen to have relatively uniform spectral features, regardless of their position in the sky or distance from the Earth. Thus it can be inferred that any major differences between quasar spectra will be caused by the interaction of their emission with atoms along the line of sight. For wavelengths of light at the energies of one of the Lyman transitions of hydrogen, the scattering cross-section is large, meaning that even for low levels of neutral hydrogen in the intergalactic medium (IGM), absorption at those wavelengths is highly likely.

For nearby objects in the universe, spectral absorption lines are very sharp, as only photons with energies just right to cause an atomic transition can cause that transition. However, the large distances between the quasars and the telescopes which detect them mean that the expansion of the universe causes light to undergo noticeable redshifting. This means that as light from the quasar travels through the IGM and is redshifted, wavelengths which had been below the Lyman alpha wavelength are stretched, and will at some point be just equal to the wavelength needed for the Lyman Alpha transition. This means that instead of showing sharp spectral absorption lines, a quasar's light which has traveled through a large, spread out region of neutral hydrogen will show a Gunn-Peterson trough.

The redshifting for a particular quasar provides temporal information about reionization. Since an object's redshift corresponds to the time at which it emitted the light, it is possible to determine when reionization ended. Quasars below a certain redshift (closer in space and time) do not show the Gunn-Peterson trough (though they may show the Lyman-alpha forest), while quasars emitting light prior to reionization will feature a Gunn-Peterson trough. In 2001, four quasars were detected by the Sloan Digital Sky Survey with redshifts ranging from z = 5.82 to z = 6.28. While the quasars above z = 6 showed a Gunn-Peterson trough, indicating that the IGM was still at least partly neutral, the ones below did not, meaning the hydrogen was ionized. As reionization is expected to occur over relatively short timescales, the results suggest that the universe was approaching the end of reionization at z = 6. This, in turn, suggests that the universe must still have been almost entirely neutral at z > 10. On the other hand, long absorption troughs persisting down to z < 5.5 in the Lyman-alpha and Lyman-beta forests suggest that reionization potentially extends later than z = 6.

=== CMB anisotropy and polarization ===
The anisotropy of the cosmic microwave background on different angular scales can also be used to study reionization. Photons undergo scattering when there are free electrons present, in a process known as Thomson scattering. However, as the universe expands, the density of free electrons will decrease, and scattering will occur less frequently. In the period during and after reionization, but before significant expansion had occurred to sufficiently lower the electron density, the light that composes the CMB will experience observable Thomson scattering. This scattering will leave its mark on the CMB anisotropy map, introducing secondary anisotropies (anisotropies introduced after recombination). The overall effect is to erase anisotropies that occur on smaller scales. While anisotropies on small scales are erased, polarization anisotropies are actually introduced because of reionization. By looking at the CMB anisotropies observed, and comparing with what they would look like had reionization not taken place, the electron column density at the time of reionization can be determined. With this, the age of the universe when reionization occurred can then be calculated.

The Wilkinson Microwave Anisotropy Probe allowed that comparison to be made. The initial observations, released in 2003, suggested that reionization took place from 30 > z > 11. This redshift range was in clear disagreement with the results from studying quasar spectra. However, the three year WMAP data returned a different result, with reionization beginning at z = 11 and the universe ionized by z = 7. This is in much better agreement with the quasar data.

Results in 2018 from Planck mission, yield an instantaneous reionization redshift of z = 7.68 ± 0.79.

The parameter usually quoted here is τ, the "optical depth to reionization," or alternatively, z_{re}, the redshift of reionization, assuming it was an instantaneous event. While this is unlikely to be physical, since reionization was very likely not instantaneous, z_{re} provides an estimate of the mean redshift of reionization.

=== Lyman alpha emission ===
Lyman alpha light from galaxies offers a complementary tool set to study reionization. The Lyman alpha line is the n=2 to n=1 transition of neutral hydrogen and can be produced copiously by galaxies with young stars. Moreover, Lyman alpha photons interact strongly with neutral hydrogen in intergalactic gas through resonant scattering, wherein neutral atoms in the ground (n=1) state absorb Lyman alpha photons and almost immediately re-emit them in a random direction. This obscures Lyman alpha emission from galaxies that are embedded in neutral gas. Thus, experiments to find galaxies by their Lyman alpha light can indicate the ionization state of the surrounding gas. An average density of galaxies with detectable Lyman alpha emission means the surrounding gas must be ionized, while an absence of detectable Lyman alpha sources may indicate neutral regions. A closely related class of experiments measures the Lyman alpha line strength in samples of galaxies identified by other methods (primarily Lyman break galaxy searches).

The earliest application of this method was in 2004, when the tension between late neutral gas indicated by quasar spectra and early reionization suggested by CMB results was strong. The detection of Lyman alpha galaxies at redshift z=6.5 demonstrated that the intergalactic gas was already predominantly ionized at an earlier time than the quasar spectra suggested. Subsequent applications of the method suggested some residual neutral gas as recently as z=6.5, but still indicate that a majority of intergalactic gas was ionized prior to z=7.

Lyman alpha emission can be used in other ways to probe reionization further. Theory suggests that reionization was patchy, meaning that the clustering of Lyman alpha selected samples should be strongly enhanced during the middle phases of reionization. Moreover, specific ionized regions can be pinpointed by identifying groups of Lyman alpha emitters.

=== 21-cm line ===
Even with the quasar data roughly in agreement with the CMB anisotropy data, there are still a number of questions, especially concerning the energy sources of reionization and the effects on, and role of, structure formation during reionization. The 21-cm line in hydrogen is potentially a means of studying this period, as well as the "dark ages" that preceded reionization. The 21-cm line occurs in neutral hydrogen, due to differences in energy between the spin triplet and spin singlet states of the electron and proton. This transition is forbidden, meaning it occurs extremely rarely. The transition is also highly temperature dependent, meaning that as objects form in the "dark ages" and emit Lyman-alpha photons that are absorbed and re-emitted by surrounding neutral hydrogen, it will produce a 21-cm line signal in that hydrogen through Wouthuysen-Field coupling. By studying 21-cm line emission, it will be possible to learn more about the early structures that formed. Observations from the Experiment to Detect the Global Epoch of Reionization Signature (EDGES) points to a signal from this era, although follow-up observations will be needed to confirm it. Several other projects hope to make headway in this area in the near future, such as the Precision Array for Probing the Epoch of Reionization (PAPER), Low Frequency Array (LOFAR), Murchison Widefield Array (MWA), Giant Metrewave Radio Telescope (GMRT), Mapper of the IGM Spin Temperature (MIST), the Dark Ages Radio Explorer (DARE) mission, and the Large-Aperture Experiment to Detect the Dark Ages (LEDA).

== Energy sources ==
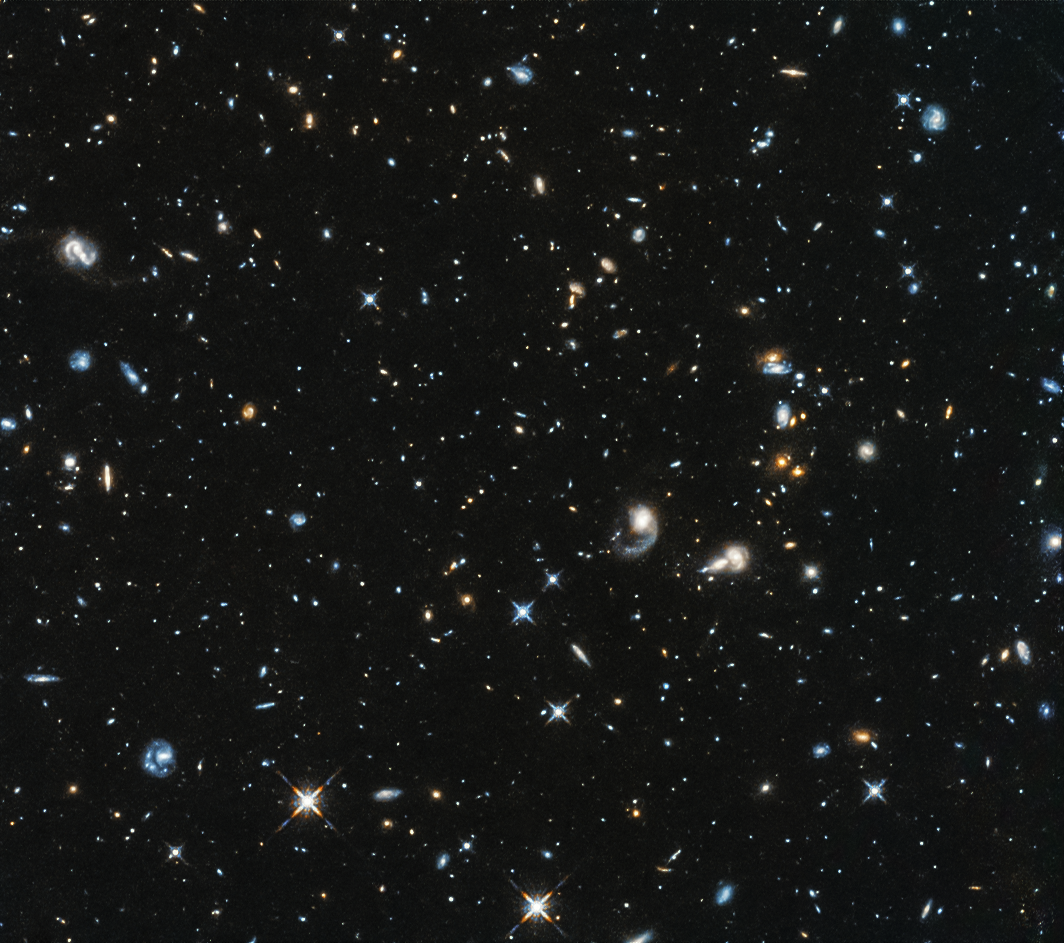
Astronomers hope to use observations such as this 2018 Hubble Space Telescope image to answer the question of how the Universe was reionised.

While observations have come in which narrow the window during which the epoch of reionization could have taken place, it is still uncertain which objects provided the photons that reionized the IGM. To ionize neutral hydrogen, an energy larger than 13.6 eV is required, which corresponds to photons with a wavelength of 91.2 nm or shorter. This is in the ultraviolet part of the electromagnetic spectrum, which means that the primary candidates are all sources which produce a significant amount of energy in the ultraviolet and above. How numerous the source is must also be considered, as well as the longevity, as protons and electrons will recombine if energy is not continuously provided to keep them apart. Altogether, the critical parameter for any source considered can be summarized as its "emission rate of hydrogen-ionizing photons per unit cosmological volume." With these constraints, it is expected that quasars and first generation stars and galaxies were the main sources of energy.

=== Dwarf galaxies ===
Dwarf galaxies are currently considered to be the primary source of ionizing photons during the epoch of reionization. For most scenarios, this would require the log-slope of the UV galaxy luminosity function, often denoted α, to be steeper than it is today, approaching α = -2. With the advent of the James Webb Space Telescope (JWST), constraints on the UV luminosity function at the Epoch of Reionization have become commonplace, allowing for better constraints on the faint, low-mass population of galaxies.

In 2014, two separate studies identified two Green Pea galaxies (GPs) to be likely Lyman Continuum (LyC)-emitting candidates. Compact dwarf star-forming galaxies like the GPs are considered excellent low-redshift analogs of high-redshift Lyman-alpha and LyC emitters (LAEs and LCEs, respectively). At that time, only two other LCEs were known: Haro 11 and Tololo-1247-232. Finding local LyC emitters has thus become crucial to the theories about the early universe and the epoch of reionization.

A subsequent series of surveys has been conducted using Hubble Space Telescope's Cosmic Origins Spectrograph (HST/COS) to measure the LyC directly. These efforts culminated in the Low-redshift Lyman Continuum Survey, a large HST/COS program which nearly tripled the number of direct measurements of the LyC from dwarf galaxies. To date, at least 50 LCEs have been confirmed using HST/COS with LyC escape fractions anywhere from ≈ 0 to 88%. The results from the Low-redshift Lyman Continuum Survey have provided the empirical foundation necessary to identify and understand LCEs at the Epoch of Reionization. With new observations from JWST, populations of LCEs are now being studied at cosmological redshifts greater than 6, allowing for the first time a detailed and direct assessment of the origins of cosmic Reionization. Combining these large samples of galaxies with new constraints on the UV luminosity function indicates that dwarf galaxies overwhelmingly contribute to Reionization.

=== Quasars ===
Quasars, a class of active galactic nuclei (AGN), were considered a good candidate source because they are highly efficient at converting mass to energy, and emit a great deal of light above the threshold for ionizing hydrogen. It is unknown, however, how many quasars existed prior to reionization. Only the brightest of quasars present during reionization can be detected, which means there is no direct information about dimmer quasars that existed. However, by looking at the more easily observed quasars in the nearby universe, and assuming that the luminosity function (number of quasars as a function of luminosity) during reionization will be approximately the same as it is today, it is possible to make estimates of the quasar populations at earlier times. Such studies have found that quasars do not exist in high enough numbers to reionize the IGM alone, saying that "only if the ionizing background is dominated by low-luminosity AGNs can the quasar luminosity function provide enough ionizing photons."

=== Population III stars ===
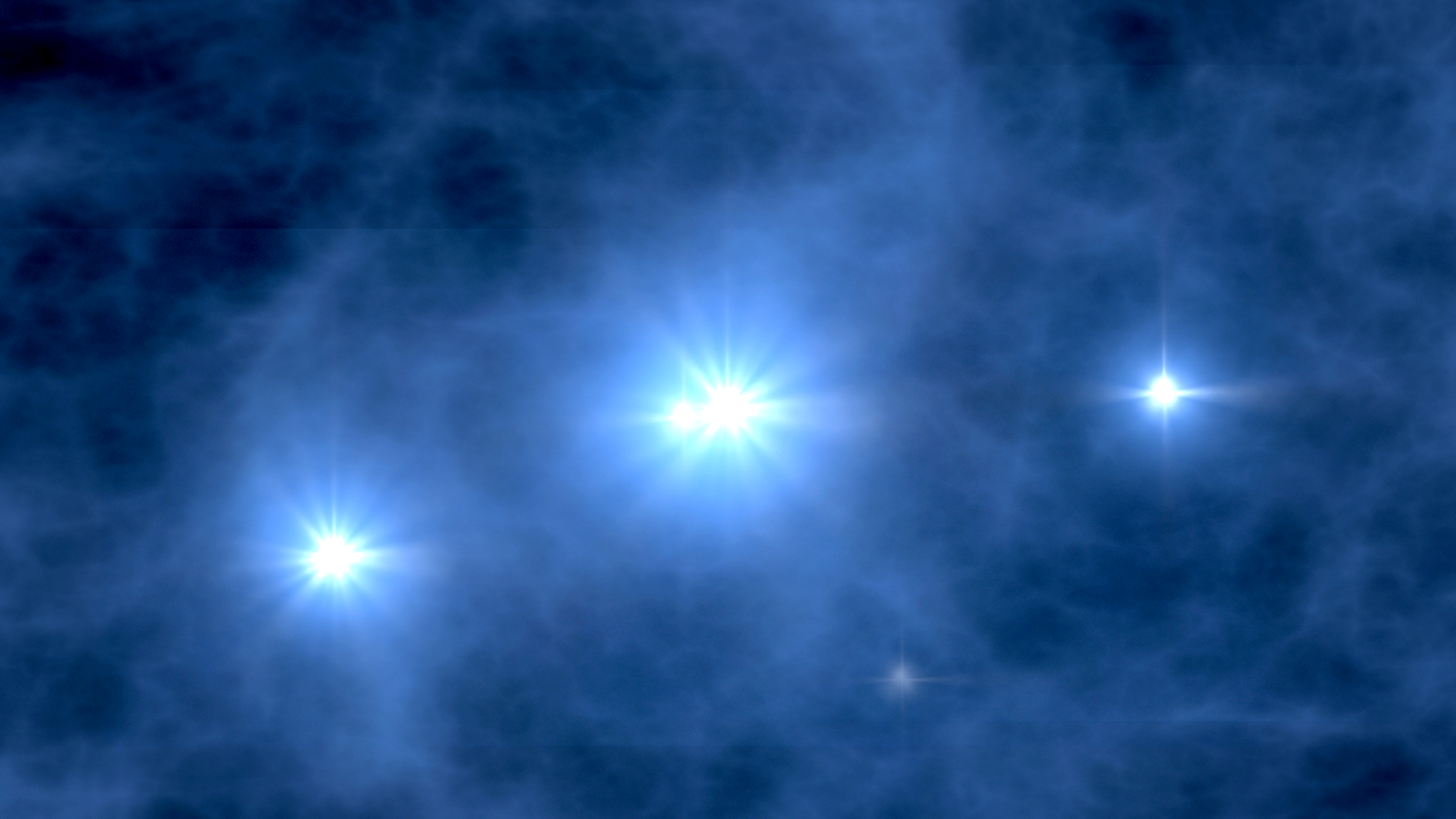
Simulated image of the first stars, 400 million years after the Big Bang.

Population III stars were the earliest stars, which had no elements more massive than hydrogen or helium. During Big Bang nucleosynthesis, the only elements that formed aside from hydrogen and helium were trace amounts of lithium. Yet quasar spectra have revealed the presence of heavy elements in the intergalactic medium at an early era. Supernova explosions produce such heavy elements, so hot, large, Population III stars which will form supernovae are a possible mechanism for reionization. While they have not been directly observed, they are consistent according to models using numerical simulation and current observations. A gravitationally lensed galaxy also provides indirect evidence of Population III stars. Even without direct observations of Population III stars, they are a compelling source. They are more efficient and effective ionizers than Population II stars, as they emit more ionizing photons, and are capable of reionizing hydrogen on their own in some reionization models with reasonable initial mass functions. As a consequence, Population III stars are currently considered the most likely energy source to initiate the reionization of the universe, though other sources are likely to have taken over and driven reionization to completion.

In June 2015, astronomers reported evidence for Population III stars in the Cosmos Redshift 7 galaxy at z = 6.60. Such stars are likely to have existed in the very early universe (i.e., at high redshift), and may have started the production of chemical elements heavier than hydrogen that are needed for the later formation of planets and life as we know it.

== See also ==
- Big Bang
- Chronology of the universe
- Clumping factor – statistic key to modeling reionization
- Galaxies in the local universe that 'leak' Lyman continuum photons.
  - Haro 11 – first of two galaxies
  - Tololo-1247-232 – second of two galaxies
- List of the most distant astronomical objects
- Pea galaxy
- Quasars
- Strömgren sphere
