= List of galaxies =

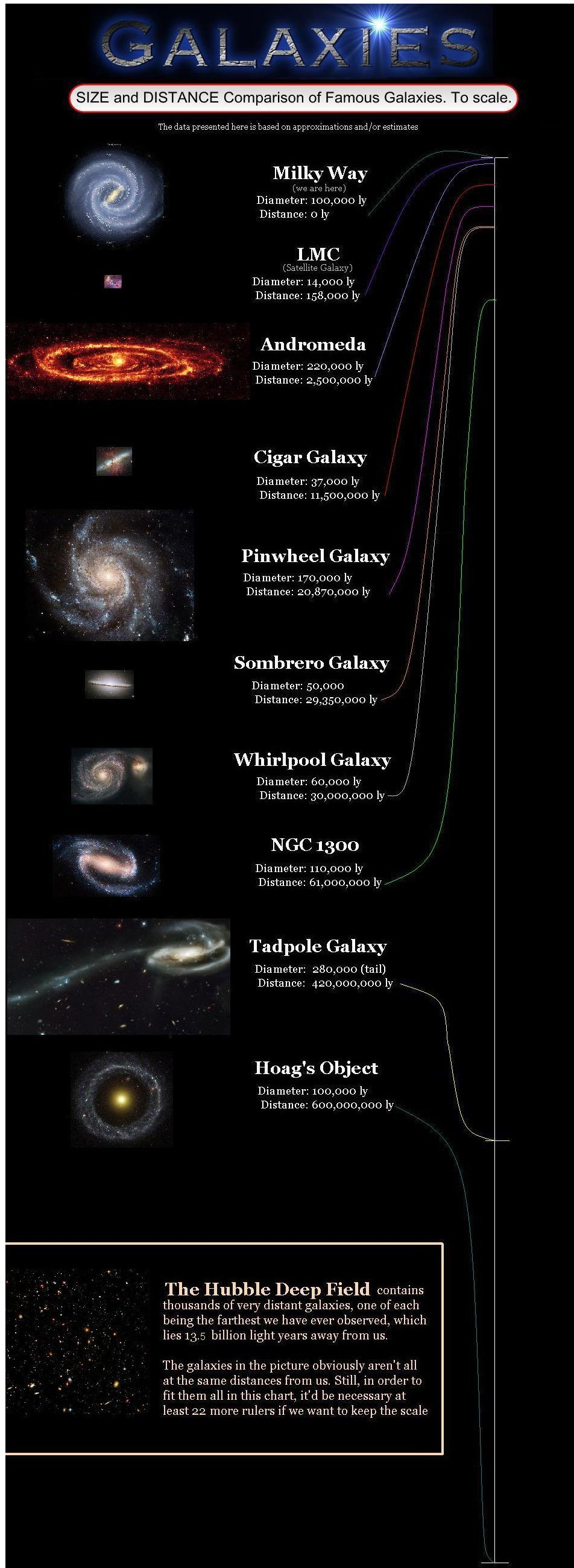
Size (left) and distance (right) of a few well-known galaxies put to scale

An estimated 2 trillion+ galaxies occupy the observable universe. On the order of 100,000 galaxies make up the Local Supercluster, and about 51 galaxies are in the Local Group (see list of nearest galaxies for a complete list).

The first attempts at systematic catalogues of galaxies were made in the 1960s, with the Catalogue of Galaxies and Clusters of Galaxies listing 29,418 galaxies and galaxy clusters, and with the Morphological Catalogue of Galaxies, a putatively complete list of galaxies with photographic magnitude above 15, listing 30,642. In the 1980s, the Lyons Groups of Galaxies listed 485 galaxy groups with 3,933 member galaxies. Galaxy Zoo is a project aiming at a more comprehensive list: launched in July 2007, it has classified over one million galaxy images from The Sloan Digital Sky Survey, The Hubble Space Telescope and the Cosmic Assembly Near-Infrared Deep Extragalactic Legacy Survey.

== Named galaxies ==
This is a list of galaxies that are well known by something other than an entry in a catalog or list, or a set of coordinates, or a systematic designation.

Image	Galaxy	Constellation	Origin of name	Notes
False-colour image showing Alcyoneus with LOFAR radio data at 144 MHz (orange) and WISE infrared data at 3.4 micron (blue) overlaid.	Alcyoneus	Lynx		A low-exitation, Fanaroff and Riley Class II radio galaxy, one of the largest discovered.
	Andromeda I	Andromeda	Andromeda I was named because the galaxy is in the constellation Andromeda	Andromeda I is a dwarf spheroidal galaxy (dSph) about 2.40 million light-years away in the constellation Andromeda. Andromeda I is part of the local group of galaxies and a satellite galaxy of the Andromeda Galaxy (M31). It is roughly 3.5 degrees south and slightly east of M31. As of 2005, it is the closest known dSph companion to M31 at an estimated projected distance of ~40 kpc or ~150,000 light-years.
	Andromeda Galaxy	Andromeda	Andromeda, which is shortened from "Andromeda Galaxy", gets its name from the area of the sky in which it appears, the constellation of Andromeda.	Andromeda is the closest big galaxy to the Milky Way and is expected to collide with the Milky Way around 4.5 billion years from now. The two will eventually merge into a single new galaxy called Milkdromeda According to simulations, this object would probably be a giant elliptical galaxy, but with a centre showing less stellar density than current elliptical galaxies.
	Ambartsumian's Knot	Ursa Major	Appearance is similar to Ambartsumian's knot	NGC 3561, also known as Arp 105, is a pair of interacting galaxies NGC 3561A and NGC 3561B within the galaxy cluster Abell 1185 in Ursa Major. It was discovered by British astronomer John Herschel on 30 March 1827.[6] Its common name is "the Guitar" and contains a small tidal dwarf galaxy known as Ambartsumian's Knot that is believed to be the remnant of the extensive tidal tail pulled out of one of the galaxies.
	Antennae Galaxies	Corvus	Appearance is similar to an insect's antennae.	Two colliding galaxies
	Backward Galaxy	Centaurus	It appears to rotate backwards, as the tips of the spiral arms point in the direction of rotation.	
	Barnard's Galaxy		Named after Edward Emerson Barnard.	
	Bear Paw Galaxy	Lynx	It resembles the appearance of a bear's claw.	Also known as "Bear Claw Galaxy."
	Black Eye Galaxy	Coma Berenices	It has a spectacular dark band of absorbing dust in front of the galaxy's bright nucleus, giving rise to its nicknames of the "Black Eye" or "Evil Eye" galaxy.	Also known as "Sleeping Beauty Galaxy."
	Blinking Galaxy	Serpens	Its difficulty of viewing in a small telescope and tendency to go in and out of view.	
	Bode's Galaxy	Ursa Major	Named for Johann Elert Bode who discovered this galaxy in 1774.	Also known as Messier 81. The largest galaxy in the M81 Group. It harbors a supermassive black hole 70 million times the mass of the Sun.
	Butterfly Galaxies	Virgo	Looks are similar to a butterfly.	
	Cartwheel Galaxy	Sculptor	Its visual appearance is similar to that of a spoked cartwheel.	The largest in the Cartwheel Galaxy group, made up of four spiral galaxies
	Cigar Galaxy	Ursa Major	Appears similar in shape to a cigar.	Also known as Messier 82 or M82
	Circinus Galaxy	Circinus	Named after the constellation it is located in (Circinus).	
	Cocoon Galaxy	Canes Venatici	Its resemblance in shape to a cocoon	
	Coma Pinwheel Galaxy	Coma Berenices	Named after its resemblance to the Pinwheel Galaxy and its location in the Coma Berenices constellation.	Also known as Messier 99 or M99
	Comet Galaxy	Sculptor	This galaxy is named after its unusual appearance, looking like a comet.	The comet effect is caused by tidal stripping by its galaxy cluster, Abell 2667.
	Condor Galaxy	Pavo	Named after a condor, a type of vulture that is one of the largest flying birds.	The largest known spiral galaxy, it has a diameter of over 665,300 light-years (204.0 kiloparsecs). It is tidally disturbed by the smaller lenticular galaxy IC 4970.
	Cosmos Redshift 7	Sextans	The name of this galaxy is based on a Redshift (z) measurement of nearly 7 (actually, z = 6.604).	Galaxy Cosmos Redshift 7 is reported to be the brightest of distant galaxies (z > 6) and to contain some of the earliest first stars (first generation; Population III) that produced the chemical elements needed for the later formation of planets and life as we know it.
	Dusty Hand Galaxy	Camelopardalis	Named after the dust lanes and spiral arms of the galaxy.	
	Dusty Spiral Galaxy	Coma Berenices	Named after the dust lanes and spiral arms of the galaxy.	
	Eye of God	Eridanus	Named after its structural appearance	A prototype for multi-arm spiral galaxies
	Eye of Sauron	Canes Venatici	Due to its resemblance to the Eye of Sauron from The Lord of the Rings.	
	Fireworks Galaxy	Cygnus and Cepheus	Due to its bright and spotty appearance	Active starburst galaxy
	Fried Egg Galaxy	Pegasus	Due to its similar appearance to a fried egg	
	Godzilla Galaxy	Perseus	Its extremely large size	
	Grasshopper	Lynx	Named after its appearance to a grasshopper	Two colliding galaxies
	Hamburger Galaxy	Leo	Named after its resemblance to a Hamburger.	
	Helix Galaxy	Ursa Major	Its shape resembles a helix	
	Hidden Galaxy	Camelopardalis	The difficulty in observing this object makes it 'hidden' though it can readily be detected even with binoculars.	
	Hockey Stick Galaxies	Canes Venatici	Its elongated and curved appearance resembles a hockey stick.	Also known as Crowbar Galaxy
	Hoag's Object	Serpens Caput	This is named after Art Hoag, who discovered this ring galaxy.	It is of the subtype Hoag-type galaxy, and may in fact be a polar-ring galaxy with the ring in the plane of rotation of the central object.
	Knife Edge Galaxy	Draco	Named after its thin shape, similar to knife's edge.	
	Large Magellanic Cloud	Dorado/Mensa	Named after Ferdinand Magellan	This is the fourth-largest galaxy in the Local Group, and forms a pair with the SMC, and from recent research, may not be part of the Milky Way system of satellites at all.
	Lindsay-Shapley Ring	Volans	Named after its discoverer, Eric Lindsay, his professor Harlow Shapley, and its nature as a ring galaxy.	The ring is the result of collision with another galaxy
	Little Sombrero Galaxy	Pegasus	Named after its similarity to the Sombrero Galaxy.	
	Malin 1	Coma Berenices	Discovered and named by David Malin.	
	Meathook Galaxy	Volans	After its appearance resembling a meathook.	
	Medusa Merger	Ursa Major	Ejected dust from the merging galaxies is said to look like the snakes that the Gorgon Medusa from Greek mythology had on her head.	
	Sculptor Dwarf Galaxy	Sculptor	Similar to the Sculpture Galaxies	Also known as Sculptor Dwarf Elliptical Galaxy, Sculptor Dwarf Spheroidal Galaxy, and formerly as the Sculptor System
	Mice Galaxies	Coma Berenices	Appearance is similar to a mouse.	
	Small Magellanic Cloud	Tucana	Named after Ferdinand Magellan	This forms a pair with the LMC, and from recent research, may not be part of the Milky Way system of satellites at all.
	Mayall's Object	Ursa Major	This is named after Nicholas Mayall, of the Lick Observatory, who discovered it.	Also called VV 32 and Arp 148, this is a very peculiar looking object, and is likely to be not one galaxy, but two galaxies undergoing a collision. Event in images is a spindle shape and a ring shape.
	Milky Way	Sagittarius (centre)	The appearance from Earth of the galaxy—a band of light	The galaxy containing the Sun and its Solar System, and therefore Earth.
	Needle Galaxy	Coma Berenices	Named due to its slender appearance.	Also known as Caldwell 38
	Wolf-Lundmark-Melotte	Cetus	Named for the three astronomers instrumental in its discovery and identification.	
	Paramecium Galaxy	Pegasus	Named after its appearance to the organism Paramecium	It is included in the Atlas of Peculiar Galaxies in the category galaxies with detached segments.
	Peekaboo Galaxy	Hydra	Galaxy (aka HIPASS J1131-31) was hidden behind a relatively fast-moving foreground star (TYC 7215–199–1) and became observable when the star moved aside.	Galaxy, relatively nearby, is considered one of the most metal-poor ("extremely metal-poor" (XMP)), least chemically enriched, and seemingly primordial, galaxies known.
	Pinwheel Galaxy	Ursa Major	Similar in appearance to a pinwheel.	Also known as Messier 101 or M101.
Radio image of Porphyrion, a black hole jet system spanning an estimated 23 million light-years.	Porphyrion	Draco		
	Porpoise Galaxy	Hydra	Its appearance resembles a porpoise	Also known as the Penguin Galaxy
	Sculptor Galaxy	Sculptor	Named after its location in the Sculptor Constellation. Also called the Silver Dollar or Silver Coin Galaxy, because of its light and circular appearance.	Also known as the Silver Coin, Silver Dollar Galaxy or Caldwell 65
	Sculptor Pinwheel Galaxy	Sculptor	Named after its resemblance to a pinwheel and its location in the Sculptor Constellation.	Also known as NGC 300 and Caldwell 70.
	Skyrocket Galaxy	Ursa Major	Its resemblance to a July 4th skyrocket	
	Sombrero Galaxy	Virgo	Similar in appearance to a sombrero.	Also known as Messier Object 104 or M104
	Southern Pinwheel Galaxy	Hydra	Named after its resemblance to the Pinwheel Galaxy and its location in the southern celestial hemisphere.	
	Spider Galaxy	Boötes	Named after its appearance of a spider	
	Spiderweb Galaxy	Hydra	Its irregular shape and continuous structure resembles a spiderweb.	
	Starfish Galaxy	Ophiuchus	Similar in appearance to a starfish.	Merger of 3 galaxies
	Sunflower Galaxy	Canes Venatici	Similar in appearance to a sunflower.	
	Surfboard Galaxy	Ursa Major	Similar in appearance to a surfboard.	Also known as Messier 108 or M108.
	Tadpole Galaxy	Draco	The name comes from the resemblance of the galaxy to a tadpole.	This shape resulted from tidal interaction that drew out a long tidal tail.
	Topsy Turvy Galaxy	Reticulum	The disorganized and chaotic appearance makes it look topsy turvy.	
	Trekkie Galaxy	Caelum	Its NGC number almost matches the serial number of the spaceship USS Enterprise from Star Trek	
	Triangulum Galaxy	Triangulum	Named after its location within the Triangulum constellation.	
	UFO Galaxy	Lynx	Named after its resemblance to a UFO.	
	Whale Galaxy	Canes Venatici	Named after its supposed resemblance to a whale.	
	Whirlpool Galaxy	Canes Venatici	From the whirlpool appearance this gravitationally disturbed galaxy exhibits.	

== Naked-eye galaxies ==
This is a list of galaxies that are visible to the naked eye, for at the very least, keen-eyed observers in a very dark-sky environment that is high in altitude, during clear and stable weather.

Naked-eye galaxies
Galaxy	Apparent Magnitude	Distance	Constellation	Notes
Milky Way	−6.5 (Note: Excluding the Sun. Using the formula for addition of apparent magnitudes, the added magnitudes of all stars in the Milky Way but the Sun (−6.50) and the Sun (−26.74) differs from the apparent magnitude of just the sun by less than 10^-8.)	0	Sagittarius (centre)	This is the galaxy containing the Sun and its Solar System, and therefore Earth. Most things visible to the naked eye in the sky are part of it, including the Milky Way composing the Zone of Avoidance.
Large Magellanic Cloud	0.9	160 kly (49 kpc)	Dorado/Mensa	Visible only from the southern hemisphere. It is also the brightest patch of nebulosity in the sky.
Small Magellanic Cloud (NGC 292)	2.7	200 kly (61 kpc)	Tucana	Visible only from the southern hemisphere.
Andromeda Galaxy (M31, NGC 224)	3.4	2.5 Mly (770 kpc)	Andromeda	Once called the Great Andromeda Nebula, it is situated in the Andromeda constellation.
Triangulum Galaxy (M33, NGC 598)	5.7	2.9 Mly (890 kpc)	Triangulum	Being a diffuse object, its visibility is strongly affected by even small amounts of light pollution, ranging from easily visible in direct vision in truly dark skies to a difficult averted vision object in rural/suburban skies.
Centaurus A (NGC 5128)	6.84	13.7 Mly (4.2 Mpc)	Centaurus	Centaurus A has been spotted with the naked eye by Stephen James O'Meara.
Bode's Galaxy (M81, NGC 3031)	6.94	12 Mly (3.7 Mpc)	Ursa Major	Highly experienced amateur astronomers may be able to see Messier 81 under exceptional observing conditions.

- Sagittarius Dwarf Spheroidal Galaxy is not listed, because it is not discernible as being a separate galaxy in the sky.

== Observational firsts ==
First	Galaxy	Constellation	Year	Notes
First spiral galaxy	Whirlpool Galaxy	Canes Venatici	1845	Lord William Parsons, Earl of Rosse discovered the first spiral nebula from observing M51 (recognition of the spiral shape without the recognition of the object as outside the Milky Way).
Notion of galaxy	Milky Way & Andromeda Galaxy	Sagittarius (centre) & Andromeda	1923	Recognition of the Milky Way and the Andromeda nebula as two separate galaxies by Edwin Hubble.
First Seyfert galaxy	NGC 1068 (M77)	Cetus	1943 (1908)	The characteristics of Seyfert galaxies were first observed in M77 in 1908; however, Seyferts were defined as a class in 1943.
First radio galaxy	Cygnus A	Cygnus	1951	Of several items, then called radio stars, Cygnus A was identified with a distant galaxy, being the first of many radio stars to become a radio galaxy.
First quasar	3C 273	Virgo	1962	3C273 was the first quasar with its redshift determined, and by some considered the first quasar.
First quasar	3C 48	Triangulum	1960	3C48 was the first "radio-star" with an unreadable spectrum, and by others considered the first quasar.
First superluminal galactic jet	3C 279	Virgo	1971	The jet is emitted by a quasar
First low surface brightness galaxy	Malin 1	Coma Berenices	1986	Malin 1 was the first verified LSB galaxy. LSB galaxies had been first theorized in 1976.
First superluminal jet from a Seyfert	III Zw 2	Pisces	2000	

== Prototypes ==
This is a list of galaxies that became prototypes for a class of galaxies.

Prototype Galaxies
Class	Galaxy	Constellation	Date	Notes
BL Lac object	BL Lacertae (BL Lac)	Lacerta		This AGN was originally catalogued as a variable star, and "stars" of its type are considered BL Lac objects.
Hoag-type Galaxy	Hoag's Object	Serpens Caput		This is the prototype Hoag-type ring galaxy
Giant LSB galaxy	Malin 1	Coma Berenices	1986	
FR II radio galaxy (double-lobed radio galaxy)	Cygnus A	Cygnus	1951	
Starburst galaxy	Cigar Galaxy	Ursa Major		
Flocculent spiral galaxy	NGC 2841	Ursa Major		

== Closest and most distant-known galaxies by type ==
Title	Galaxy	Constellation	Distance	Notes
Closest galaxy	Ursa Major III	Ursa Major	32,600 light-years (10 kiloparsecs)	A proposed dwarf galaxy known as the Canis Major Overdensity may lie closer at 25,000 light-years, however its status as a galaxy is disputed.
Most distant galaxy	MoM-z14	Sextans	z=14.44	Existed 280 million years after the Big Bang.
Closest quasar	Markarian 231	Ursa Major	z=0.0415	Sometimes classified as a Type-2 Seyfert galaxy, though mostly considered to be the nearest quasar.
Most distant quasar	UHZ1	Sculptor	z=10.1	Gravitationally lensed quasar behind Pandora's Cluster (Abell 2744). It is also the first quasar observed beyond a redshift of 10.
Closest radio galaxy	Centaurus A (NGC 5128, PKS 1322–427)	Centaurus	13.7 Mly	
Most distant radio galaxy	ILT J2336+1842	Pegasus	z=6.6	Another radio galaxy, GLEAM J0917-0012, may either lie at z=2.01 or as distant as z=8.21.
Closest Seyfert galaxy	Circinus Galaxy	Circinus	13 Mly	Closest undisputed Seyfert galaxy. It has been proposed that the nearby (2.05 Mly) dwarf galaxy NGC 185 may also be a Seyfert, though this status has been disputed.
Most distant Seyfert galaxy	HSC 0921+0007	Hydra	z=6.56	Seyfert 1 galaxy; also a low-luminosity quasar.
Closest blazar	Markarian 421 (Mrk 421, Mkn 421, PKS 1101+384, LEDA 33452)	Ursa Major	z=0.030	This is a BL Lac object.
Most distant-known blazar	Q0906+6930	Ursa Major	z=5.47	This is a flat spectrum radio-loud quasar-type blazar.
Closest BL Lac object	Centaurus A	Centaurus	13.7 Mly	Misaligned BL Lac nucleus. Also the closest radio galaxy (see above)
Most distant BL Lac object	FIRST J233153.20+112952.11	Pegasus	z=6.57	
Closest LINER				
Most distant LINER			z=	
Closest LIRG				
Most distant LIRG			z=	
Closest ULIRG	IC 1127 (Arp 220/APG 220)	Serpens Caput	z=0.018	
Most distant ULIRG			z=	
Closest starburst galaxy	IC 10 (UGC 192, PGC 1305)	Cassiopeia	750 ± 150 kpc (2,450,000 ± 489,000 ly)	A mild starburst galaxy, this is the only such galaxy within the Local Group.
Most distant starburst galaxy	SPT 0243-49	Horologium	z=5.698	
Most distant spiral galaxy	Zhúlóng	Sextans	z=5.2	
Closest jellyfish galaxy	IC 3418	Virgo	17 Mpc	
Most distant jellyfish galaxy	COSMOS2020-635829	Sextans	z=1.156	A candidate jellyfish galaxy.

=== Closest galaxies ===
5 Closest Galaxies
Rank	Galaxy	Distance	Notes
1	Milky Way Galaxy	0	This is the galaxy containing the Sun and its Solar System, and therefore Earth.
2	Ursa Major III	0.032 Mly	
3	Sagittarius Dwarf Spheroidal Galaxy	0.081 Mly	
4	Large Magellanic Cloud	0.163 Mly	Largest satellite galaxy of the Milky Way
5	Small Magellanic Cloud	0.197 Mly	
Mly represents millions of light-years, a measure of distance.; Distances are measured from Earth, with Earth being at zero.

Nearest Galaxies by Type
Title	Galaxy	Date	Distance	Notes
Nearest galaxy	Milky Way	always	0	This is the galaxy containing the Sun and its Solar System, and therefore Earth.
Nearest galaxy to the Milky Way	Sagittarius Dwarf Spheroidal Galaxy	1994	0.070 Mly	The closest, undisputed galaxy. The disputed dwarf galaxy Canis Major Overdensity is even closer at 25,000 light-years.
Nearest dwarf galaxy	Sagittarius Dwarf Spheroidal Galaxy	1994	0.070 Mly	
Nearest major galaxy to the Milky Way	Andromeda Galaxy	always	2.54 Mly	First identified as a separate galaxy in 1923
Nearest giant galaxy	Maffei 1	1967	11 Mly	Nearest major elliptical galaxy to the Milky Way

Nearest Neighboring Galaxy Title-holder
Galaxy	Date	Distance	Notes
Ursa Major III	2023	0.01 Mly	
Sagittarius Dwarf Spheroidal Galaxy	1994–2023	0.026 Mly	
Large Magellanic Cloud	antiquity–1994	0.163 Mly	This is the upper bound, as it is the nearest galaxy observable with the naked eye.
Small Magellanic Cloud	1913–1914	0.197 Mly	This was the first intergalactic distance measured. In 1913, Ejnar Hertzsprung measured the distance to SMC using Cepheid variables. In 1914, he did it for LMC.
Andromeda Galaxy	1923	2.5 Mly	This was the first galaxy determined to not be part of the Milky Way.
Mly represents millions of light-years, a measure of distance.; Distances are measured from Earth, with Earth being at zero.

=== Most distant galaxies ===
Most Remote Galaxies by Type
Title	Galaxy	Date	Redshift (Note: z represents redshift, a measure of recessional velocity and inferred distance due to cosmological expansion.)	Notes
Most remote galaxy of any type, confirmed (spectroscopic redshift)	MoM-z14	2025	z=14.44	As of its announcement in May 2025.
Most remote quasar	UHZ1	2023	z=10.3	Further information: List of quasars As of its announcement in 2023.
Most distant Lyman-break galaxy	MoM-z14	2025	z=14.44	

Timeline of Most Remote Galaxy Record-holders (Note: quasars and other AGN are not included on this list, since they are only galactic cores, unless the host galaxy was observed when it was most distant.)
Galaxy	Date	Distance (z=Redshift)	Notes
MoM-z14	2025–	z=14.44	
JADES-GS-z14-0	2024–2025	z=14.32	
JADES-GS-z13-0	2022–2024	z=13.20	
GN-z11	2016–2022	z=11.09	Announced March 2016.
EGSY8p7 (EGSY-2008532660)	2015–2016	z=8.68	This galaxy's redshift was determined by examining its Lyman-alpha emissions, which were released in August 2015.
EGS-zs8-1	2015–2015	z=7.730	This was the most distant galaxy as of May 2015.
Z8 GND 5296	2013–2015	z=7.51	
SXDF-NB1006-2	2012–2013	z=7.215	
GN-108036	2012–2012	z=7.213	
BDF-3299	2012–2013	z=7.109	
IOK-1	2006–2010	z=6.96	This was the most remote object known at the time of discovery. In 2009, gamma ray burst GRB 090423 was discovered at z=8.2, taking the title of most distant object. The next galaxy to hold the title also succeeded GRB 090423, that being UDFy-38135539.
SDF J132522.3+273520	2005–2006	z=6.597	This was the remotest object known at time of discovery.
SDF J132418.3+271455	2003–2005	z=6.578	This was the remotest object known at time of discovery.
HCM-6A	2002–2003	z=6.56	This was the remotest object known at time of discovery. The galaxy is lensed by galaxy cluster Abell 370. This was the first galaxy, as opposed to quasar, found to exceed redshift 6. It exceeded the redshift of quasar SDSSp J103027.10+052455.0 of z=6.28
SSA22−HCM1	1999–2002	z=5.74	This was the remotest object known at time of discovery. In 2000, the quasar SDSSp J104433.04-012502.2 was discovered at z=5.82, becoming the most remote object in the universe known. This was followed by another quasar, SDSSp J103027.10+052455.0 in 2001, the first object exceeding redshift 6, at z=6.28
HDF 4-473.0	1998–1999	z=5.60	This was the remotest object known at the time of discovery.
RD1 (0140+326 RD1)	1998	z=5.34	This was the remotest object known at time of discovery. This was the first object found beyond redshift 5.
CL 1358+62 G1 & CL 1358+62 G2	1997–1998	z=4.92	These were the remotest objects known at the time of discovery. The pair of galaxies were found lensed by galaxy cluster CL1358+62 (z=0.33). This was the first time since 1964 that something other than a quasar held the record for being the most distant object in the universe. It exceeded the mark set by quasar PC 1247-3406 at z=4.897
From 1964 to 1997, the title of most distant object in the universe were held by a succession of quasars. That list is available at list of quasars.
8C 1435+63	1994–1997	z=4.25	This is a radio galaxy. At the time of its discovery, quasar PC 1247-3406 at z=4.73, discovered in 1991 was the most remote object known. This was the last radio galaxy to hold the title of most distant galaxy. This was the first galaxy, as opposed to quasar, that was found beyond redshift 4.
4C 41.17	1990–1994	z=3.792	This is a radio galaxy. At the time of its discovery, quasar PC 1158+4635, discovered in 1989, was the most remote object known, at z=4.73 In 1991, quasar PC 1247-3406, became the most remote object known, at z=4.897
1 Jy 0902+343 (GB6 B0902+3419, B2 0902+34)	1988–1990	z=3.395	This is a radio galaxy. At the time of discovery, quasar Q0051-279 at z=4.43, discovered in 1987, was the most remote object known. In 1989, quasar PC 1158+4635 was discovered at z=4.73, making it the most remote object known. This was the first galaxy discovered above redshift 3. It was also the first galaxy found above redshift 2.
3C 256	1984–1988	z=1.819	This is a radio galaxy. At the time, the most remote object was quasar PKS 2000-330, at z=3.78, found in 1982.
3C 241	1984	z=1.617	This is a radio galaxy. At the time, the most remote object was quasar PKS 2000-330, at z=3.78, found in 1982.
3C 324	1983–1984	z=1.206	This is a radio galaxy. At the time, the most remote object was quasar PKS 2000-330, at z=3.78, found in 1982.
3C 65	1982–1983	z=1.176	This is a radio galaxy. At the time, the most remote object was quasar OQ172, at z=3.53, found in 1974. In 1982, quasar PKS 2000-330 at z=3.78 became the most remote object.
3C 368	1982	z=1.132	This is a radio galaxy. At the time, the most remote object was quasar OQ172, at z=3.53, found in 1974.
3C 252	1981–1982	z=1.105	This is a radio galaxy. At the time, the most remote object was quasar OQ172, at z=3.53, found in 1974.
3C 6.1	1979 –	z=0.840	This is a radio galaxy. At the time, the most remote object was quasar OQ172, at z=3.53, found in 1974.
3C 318	1976 –	z=0.752	This is a radio galaxy. At the time, the most remote object was quasar OQ172, at z=3.53, found in 1974.
3C 411	1975 –	z=0.469	This is a radio galaxy. At the time, the most remote object was quasar OQ172, at z=3.53, found in 1974.
From 1964 to 1997, the title of most distant object in the universe were held by a succession of quasars. That list is available at list of quasars.
3C 295	1960–	z=0.461	This is a radio galaxy. This was the remotest object known at time of discovery of its redshift. This was the last non-quasar to hold the title of most distant object known until 1997. In 1964, quasar 3C 147 became the most distant object in the universe known.
LEDA 25177 (MCG+01-23-008)	1951–1960	z=0.2 (V=61000 km/s)	This galaxy lies in the Hydra Supercluster. It is located at B1950.0 08^{h} 55^{m} 4^{s} +03° 21′ and is the BCG of the fainter Hydra Cluster Cl 0855+0321 (ACO 732).
LEDA 51975 (MCG+05-34-069)	1936–	z=0.13 (V=39000 km/s)	The brightest cluster galaxy of the Bootes cluster (ACO 1930), an elliptical galaxy at B1950.0 14^{h} 30^{m} 6^{s} +31° 46′ apparent magnitude 17.8, was found by Milton L. Humason in 1936 to have a 40,000 km/s recessional redshift velocity.
LEDA 20221 (MCG+06-16-021)	1932 –	z=0.075 (V=23000 km/s)	This is the BCG of the Gemini Cluster (ACO 568) and was located at B1950.0 07^{h} 05^{m} 0^{s} +35° 04′
BCG of WMH Christie's Leo Cluster	1931–1932	z= (V=19700 km/s)	
BCG of Baede's Ursa Major Cluster	1930–1931	z= (V=11700 km/s)	
NGC 4860	1929–1930	z=0.026 (V=7800 km/s)	
NGC 7619	1929	z=0.012 (V=3779 km/s)	Using redshift measurements, NGC 7619 was the highest at the time of measurement. At the time of announcement, it was not yet accepted as a general guide to distance; however, later in the year, Edwin Hubble described redshift in relation to distance, leading to a seachange, and having this being accepted as an inferred distance.
NGC 584 (Dreyer nebula 584)	1921–1929	z=0.006 (V=1800 km/s)	At the time, nebula had yet to be accepted as independent galaxies. However, in 1923, galaxies were generally recognized as external to the Milky Way.
M104 (NGC 4594)	1913–1921	z=0.004 (V=1180 km/s)	This was the second galaxy whose redshift was determined; the first being Andromeda—which is approaching us and thus cannot have its redshift used to infer distance. Both were measured by Vesto Melvin Slipher. At this time, nebula had yet to be accepted as independent galaxies. NGC 4594 was originally measured as 1000 km/s, then refined to 1100, and then to 1180 in 1916.
M81	antiquity – 20th century (Note: antiquity – 1913 (based on redshift); antiquity – 1930 (based on Cepheids))	11.8 Mly z=-0.10)	This is the lower bound, as it is remotest galaxy observable with the naked eye. It is 12 million light-years away. Redshift cannot be used to infer distance, because it is moving toward us faster than cosmological expansion.
Messier 101	1930–		Using the pre-1950s Cepheid measurements, M101 was one of the most distant so measured.
Triangulum Galaxy	1924–1930		In 1924, Edwin Hubble announced the distance to M33 Triangulum.
Andromeda Galaxy	1923–1924		In 1923, Edwin Hubble measured the distance to Andromeda, and settled the question of whether or not there were galaxies, or if everything was in the Milky Way.
Small Magellanic Cloud	1913–1923		This was the first intergalactic distance measured. In 1913, Ejnar Hertzsprung measures the distance to SMC using Cepheid variables.

==== Timeline notes ====
- MACS0647-JD, discovered in 2012, with z=10.7, does not appear on this list because it has not been confirmed with a spectroscopic redshift.
- UDFy-38135539, discovered in 2009, with z=8.6, does not appear on this list because its claimed redshift is disputed. Follow-up observations have failed to replicate the cited redshift measurement.
- A1689-zD1, discovered in 2008, with z=7.6, does not appear on this list because it has not been confirmed with a spectroscopic redshift.
- Abell 68 c1 and Abell 2219 c1, discovered in 2007, with z=9, do not appear on this list because they have not been confirmed.
- IOK4 and IOK5, discovered in 2007, with z=7, do not appear on this list because they have not been confirmed with a spectroscopic redshift.
- Abell 1835 IR1916, discovered in 2004, with z=10.0, does not appear on this list because its claimed redshift is disputed. Some follow-up observations have failed to find the object at all.
- STIS 123627+621755, discovered in 1999, with z=6.68, does not appear on this list because its redshift was based on an erroneous interpretation of an oxygen emission line as a hydrogen emission line.
- BR1202-0725 LAE, discovered in 1998 at z=5.64 does not appear on the list because it was not definitively pinned. BR1202-0725 (QSO 1202-07) refers to a quasar that the Lyman alpha emitting galaxy is near. The quasar itself lies at z=4.6947
- BR2237-0607 LA1 and BR2237-0607 LA2 were found at z=4.55 while investigating around the quasar BR2237-0607 in 1996. Neither of these appear on the list because they were not definitively pinned down at the time. The quasar itself lies at z=4.558
- Two absorption dropouts in the spectrum of quasar BR 1202-07 (QSO 1202-0725, BRI 1202-0725, BRI1202-07) were found, one in early 1996, another later in 1996. Neither of these appear on the list because they were not definitively pinned down at the time. The early one was at z=4.38, the later one at z=4.687, the quasar itself lies at z=4.695
- In 1986, a gravitationally lensed galaxy forming a blue arc was found lensed by galaxy cluster CL 2224-02 (C12224 in some references). However, its redshift was only determined in 1991, at z=2.237, by which time, it would no longer be the most distant galaxy known.
- An absorption drop was discovered in 1985 in the light spectrum of quasar PKS 1614+051 at z=3.21 This does not appear on the list because it was not definitively fixed down. At the time, it was claimed to be the first non-QSO galaxy found beyond redshift 3. The quasar itself is at z=3.197
- In 1975, 3C 123 was incorrectly determined to lie at z=0.637 (actually z=0.218).
- From 1964 to 1997, the title of most distant object in the universe was held by a succession of quasars. That list is available at list of quasars.
- In 1958, clusters Cl 0024+1654 and Cl 1447+2619 were estimated to have redshifts of z=0.29 and z=0.35, respectively. However, no galaxy was spectroscopically determined.

== Galaxies by brightness and power ==
Title	Galaxy	Data	Notes
Intrinsically brightest galaxy	Baby Boom Galaxy		Starburst galaxy located 12 billion light-years away
Brightest galaxy to the naked eye	Large Magellanic Cloud	Apparent magnitude 0.6	This galaxy has high surface brightness combined with high apparent brightness.
Intrinsically faintest galaxy	Ursa Major III	Absolute magnitude +2.2	This does not include dark galaxies.
Lowest surface brightness galaxy	Andromeda IX		
Most luminous galaxy	WISE J224607.57−052635.0		As of 21 May 2015, WISE-J224607.57-052635.0-20150521 is the most luminous galaxy discovered and releases 10,000 times more energy than the Milky Way galaxy, although smaller. Nearly 100 percent of the light escaping from this dusty galaxy is Infrared radiation. (Image)
Brightest distant galaxy (z > 6)	Cosmos Redshift 7		Galaxy Cosmos Redshift 7 is reported to be the brightest of distant galaxies (z > 6) and to contain some of the earliest first stars (first generation; Population III) that produced the chemical elements needed for the later formation of planets and life as we know it.

== Galaxies by mass and density ==
Title	Galaxy	Data	Notes
Least massive galaxy	Segue 2	~550,000 M_{Sun}	This is not considered a star cluster, as it is held together by the gravitational effects of dark matter rather than just the mutual attraction of the constituent stars, gas and black holes.
Most massive galaxy	ESO 146-5	27×10^{12} M_{Sun}	Central galaxy in Abell 3827, 1.4 Gly distant.
Most dense galaxy	M85-HCC1		This is an ultra-compact dwarf galaxy
Least dense galaxy			
Most massive spiral galaxy	ISOHDFS 27	1.04×10^{12} M_{Sun}	The preceding most massive spiral was UGC 12591
Least massive galaxy with globular cluster(s)	Andromeda I		

== Galaxies by size ==
Title	Galaxy	Constellation	Diameter	Estimation method	Notes
Smallest known galaxy	Ursa Major III	Ursa Major	3 parsecs (9.8 light-years)	Half-light radius	A Milky Way satellite dwarf galaxy.
Largest known galaxy	SDSS J132951.17+575357.3	Ursa Major	1,178.33 kiloparsecs (3,843,000 light-years)	2MASS K-band total mag	
Largest brightest cluster galaxy	WHL J010417.6+135921 BCG	Pisces	837.08 kiloparsecs (2,730,200 ly)	2MASS K-band total mag	
Largest spiral galaxy	ESO 71-9	Octans	879.02 kiloparsecs (2,867,000 light-years)	90% total B-light	
Largest irregular galaxy	UGC 6697	Leo	62.82 kiloparsecs (205,000 light-years)	D_{25} isophote	Disrupted spiral-like galaxy, possible jellyfish galaxy.
Largest lenticular galaxy	ESO 248-6	Eridanus	530.62 kiloparsecs (1,731,000 light-years)	90% total B-light	Central galaxy of Abell 3112.
Largest starburst galaxy	Abell 2125 BCG	Ursa Minor	219.28 kiloparsecs (715,000 light-years)	2MASS K-band total mag	
Largest radio galaxy	TXS 0033+252	Andromeda	7,985 kiloparsecs (26,044,000 light-years)		Length of radio jets.
Largest GLSB galaxy	Malin 1	Coma Berenices	240 kiloparsecs (783,000 light-years)		Malin 1 has a radial extent of ∼120 kpc at least.

== Interacting galaxies ==
Galaxies in tidal interaction
Galaxies	Data	Notes
Milky Way Galaxy; Large Magellanic Cloud; Small Magellanic Cloud		The Magellanic Clouds are being tidally disrupted by the Milky Way Galaxy, resulting in the Magellanic Stream drawing a tidal tail away from the LMC and SMC, and the Magellanic Bridge drawing material from the clouds to the Milky Way galaxy.
Whirlpool Galaxy (NGC 5194, M51a); NGC 5195 (M51b)		The smaller galaxy NGC 5195 is tidally interacting with the larger Whirlpool Galaxy, creating its grand design spiral galaxy architecture.
M81; M82; NGC 3077		These three galaxies interact with each other and draw out tidal tails, which are dense enough to form star clusters. The bridge of gas between these galaxies is known as Arp's Loop.
NGC 6872 and IC 4970; NGC 6872; IC 4970		NGC 6872 is a barred spiral galaxy with a grand design spiral nucleus, and distinct well-formed outer barred-spiral architecture, caused by tidal interaction with satellite galaxy IC 4970.
Tadpole Galaxy		The Tadpole Galaxy tidally interacted with another galaxy in a close encounter, and remains slightly disrupted, with a long tidal tail.

Galaxies in non-merger significant collision
Galaxies	Data	Notes
Arp 299 (NGC 3690 & IC 694)		These two galaxies have recently collided and are now both barred irregular galaxies.

Galaxies disrupted post significant non-merger collisions
Galaxies	Data	Notes
Mayall's Object		This is a pair of galaxies, one which punched through the other, resulting in a ring galaxy.

=== Galaxy mergers ===
Galaxies undergoing near-equal merger
Galaxies	Data	Notes
Antennae Galaxies (Ringtail Galaxy, NGC 4038 & NGC 4039, Arp 244)	2 galaxies	Two spiral galaxies currently starting a collision, tidally interacting, and in the process of merger.
Eyes Galaxies (NGC 4435 & NGC 4438, Arp 120)	2 galaxies	Two galaxies which have interacted or still interacting via an off-center collision, both had interacted with M86 in the past.
Butterfly Galaxies (Siamese Twins Galaxies, NGC 4567 & NGC 4568)	2 galaxies	Two spiral galaxies in the process of starting to merge.
Mice Galaxies (NGC 4676, NGC 4676A & NGC 4676B, IC 819 & IC 820, Arp 242)	2 galaxies	Two spiral galaxies currently tidally interacting and in the process of merger.
NGC 520	2 galaxies	Two spiral galaxies undergoing collision, in the process of merger.
NGC 2207 and IC 2163 (NGC 2207 & IC 2163)	2 galaxies	These are two spiral galaxies starting to collide, in the process of merger.
NGC 5090 and NGC 5091 (NGC 5090 & NGC 5091)	2 galaxies	These two galaxies are in the process of colliding and merging.
NGC 7318 (Arp 319, NGC 7318A & NGC 7318B)	2 galaxies	These are two starting to collide
Four galaxies in CL0958+4702	4 galaxies	These four near-equals at the core of galaxy cluster CL 0958+4702 are in the process of merging.
Galaxy protocluster LBG-2377	z=3.03	This was announced as the most distant galaxy merger ever discovered. It is expected that this proto-cluster of galaxies will merge to form a brightest cluster galaxy, and become the core of a larger galaxy cluster.
Galaxy protocluster SPT2349-56	z=4.3 (14 galaxies)	This protocluster is located at 12.4 billion light years from the Earth. Each of these galaxies are forming stars at 1000 times that of the Milky Way, nicknamed the Dusty Red Core.

Recently merged galaxies of near-equals
Galaxy	Data	Notes
Starfish Galaxy (NGC 6240, IC 4625)		This recently coalesced galaxy still has two prominent nuclei.

Galaxies undergoing disintegration by cannibalization
Disintegrating Galaxy	Consuming Galaxy	Notes
Canis Major Dwarf Galaxy	Milky Way Galaxy	The Monoceros Ring is thought to be the tidal tail of the disrupted CMa dg.
Virgo Stellar Stream	Milky Way Galaxy	This is thought to be a completely disrupted dwarf galaxy.
Sagittarius Dwarf Elliptical Galaxy	Milky Way Galaxy	M54 is thought to be the core of this dwarf galaxy.

Objects considered destroyed galaxies
Defunct Galaxy	Destroyer	Notes
Omega Centauri	Milky Way Galaxy	This is now categorized a globular cluster of the Milky Way. However, it is considered the core of a dwarf galaxy that the Milky Way cannibalized.
Mayall II	Andromeda Galaxy	This is now categorized a globular cluster of Andromeda. However, it is considered the core of a dwarf galaxy that Andromeda cannibalized.
Gaia Sausage	Milky Way Galaxy	It is now considered a remnant of a dwarf galaxy that collided with the Milky Way about 8–11 billion years ago. It is the last major merger of the Milky Way in its lifetime.

== Galaxies with some other notable feature ==
Galaxy name	Distance	Constellation	Property	Notes
SDSS J081421.68+522410		Lynx	Giant radio lobes	Also termed Alcyoneus. Its radio lobes are some of the largest known structure made by a single galaxy.
M87		Virgo		This is the central galaxy of the Virgo Cluster, the central cluster of the Local Supercluster It contains the first black hole ever imaged, in April 2019, by the Event Horizon Telescope.
M102		Draco (Ursa Major)		This galaxy cannot be definitively identified, with the most likely candidate being NGC 5866, and a good chance of it being a misidentification of M101. Other candidates have also been suggested.
NGC 2770		Lynx	"Supernova Factory"	NGC 2770 is referred to as the "Supernova Factory" due to three recent supernovae occurring within it.
Arp 122				Arp 122 is a collision of NGC 6040 and PGC 56942 or NGC 6039.
NGC 3314 (NGC 3314a and NGC 3314b)		Hydra	exact visual alignment	This is a pair of spiral galaxies, one superimposed on another, at two separate and distinct ranges, and unrelated to each other. It is a rare chance visual alignment.
ESO 137-001		Triangulum Australe	"tail" feature	Lying in the galaxy cluster Abell 3627, this galaxy is being stripped of its gas by the pressure of the intracluster medium (ICM), due to its high speed traversal through the cluster, and is leaving a high density tail with large amounts of star formation. The tail features the largest amount of star formation outside of a galaxy seen so far. The galaxy has the appearance of a comet, with the head being the galaxy, and a tail of gas and stars.
Comet Galaxy		Sculptor	interacting with a galaxy cluster	Lying in galaxy cluster Abell 2667, this spiral galaxy is being tidally stripped of stars and gas through its high speed traversal through the cluster, having the appearance of a comet.
4C +37.11	230 Mpc	Perseus	Least separation between binary central black holes, at 24 ly (7.4 pc)	OJ 287 has an inferred pair with a 12-year orbital period, and thus would be much closer than 4C 37.11's pair.
SDSS J150636.30+540220.9; 15^{h} 06^{m} 36.30^{s}+54° 02′ 20.9″ ("SDSS J1506+54")	z = 0.608	Boötes	Most efficient star production	Most extreme example in the list of moderate-redshift galaxies with the highest density starbursts yet observed found in the Wide-field Infrared Survey Explorer data (Diamond-Stanic et al. 2012).
Cosmos Redshift 7	z = 6.604	Sextans	Brightest distant galaxy (z > 6, 12.9 billion light-years)	Galaxy Cosmos Redshift 7 is reported to be the brightest of distant galaxies (z > 6) and to contain some of the earliest first stars (first generation; Population III) that produced the chemical elements needed for the later formation of planets and life as we know it.
RUBIES-UDS-QG-z7	z = 7.29	Cetus	Earliest known massive quiescent galaxy	This galaxy is reported to be the most distant and therefore earliest (700 million years after the Big Bang) massive galaxy where star formation stopped, contrary to expectations based on current models of galaxy formation.
AMORE6	z = 5.725	Sculptor	Most pristine galaxy	This galaxy is reported to be very metal poor, with the oxygen abundance of 12+log(O/H) < 5.8 (2 sigma), or <0.12% of Solar abundance, measured via JWST spectroscopy. This metallicity measurement is the lowest in the literature, making it the most pristine galaxy to date.

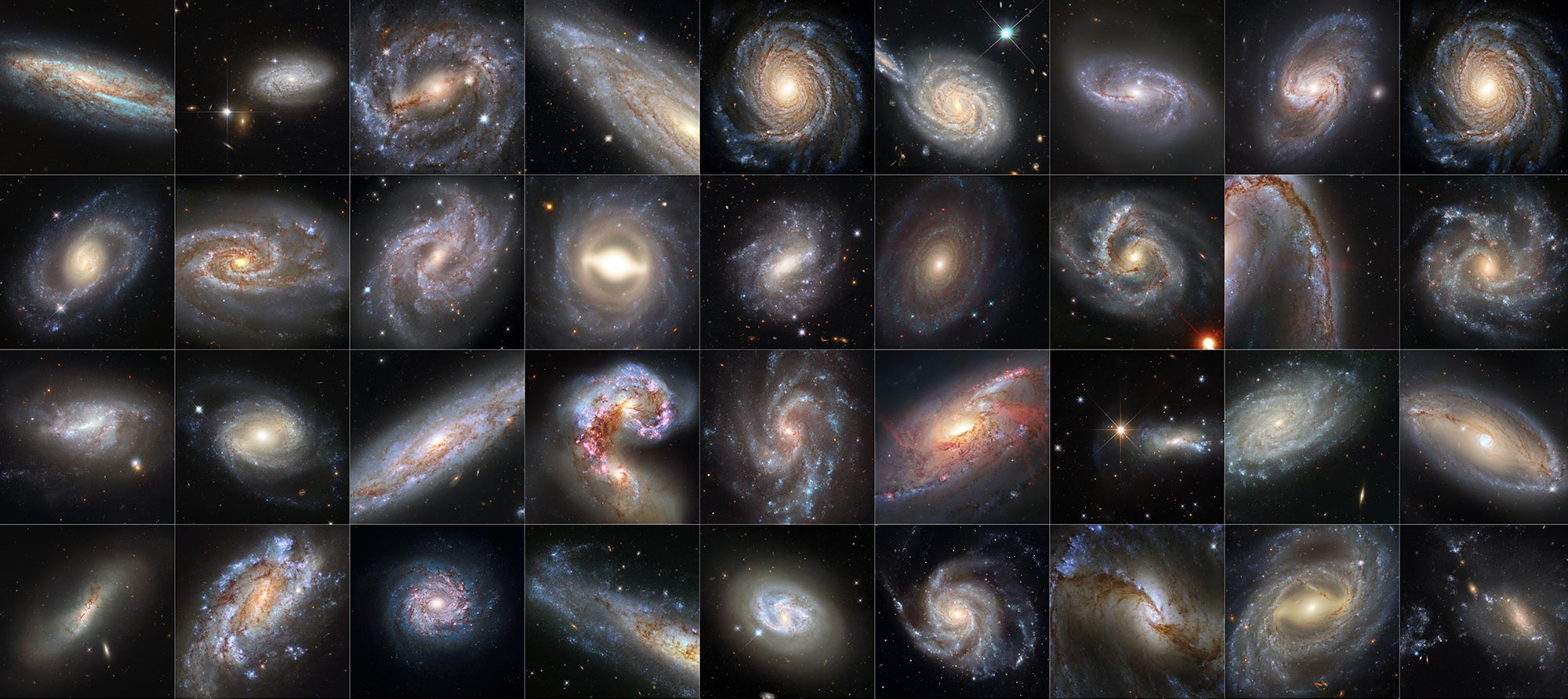
Galaxies (left/top, right/bottom): NGC 7541, NGC 3021, NGC 5643, NGC 3254, NGC 3147, NGC 105, NGC 2608, NGC 3583, NGC 3147, MRK 1337, NGC 5861, NGC 2525, NGC 1015, UGC 9391, NGC 691, NGC 7678, NGC 2442, NGC 5468, NGC 5917, NGC 4639, NGC 3972, The Antennae Galaxies, NGC 5584, M106, NGC 7250, NGC 3370, NGC 5728, NGC 4424, NGC 1559, NGC 3982, NGC 1448, NGC 4680, M101, NGC 1365, NGC 7329, NGC 3447

== See also ==
- Infinity galaxy - First galaxy to show evidence of formation of supermassive black holes, through the direct collapse mechanism.
- Blueberry galaxy - Small and very active galaxies.
- Galaxy
- Galaxy groups and clusters
- Illustris project
- List of galaxy groups and clusters
- List of galaxy superclusters
- Lists of astronomical objects
- Local Group
- Milky Way Galaxy
- Supercluster
- Virgo Supercluster

=== Lists of galaxies ===
- Local Group
- List of largest galaxies
- List of smallest galaxies
- List of nearest galaxies
- List of polar-ring galaxies
- List of spiral galaxies
- List of ring galaxies
- List of quasars
