= NGC 481 =

Elliptical galaxy in the constellation Cetus

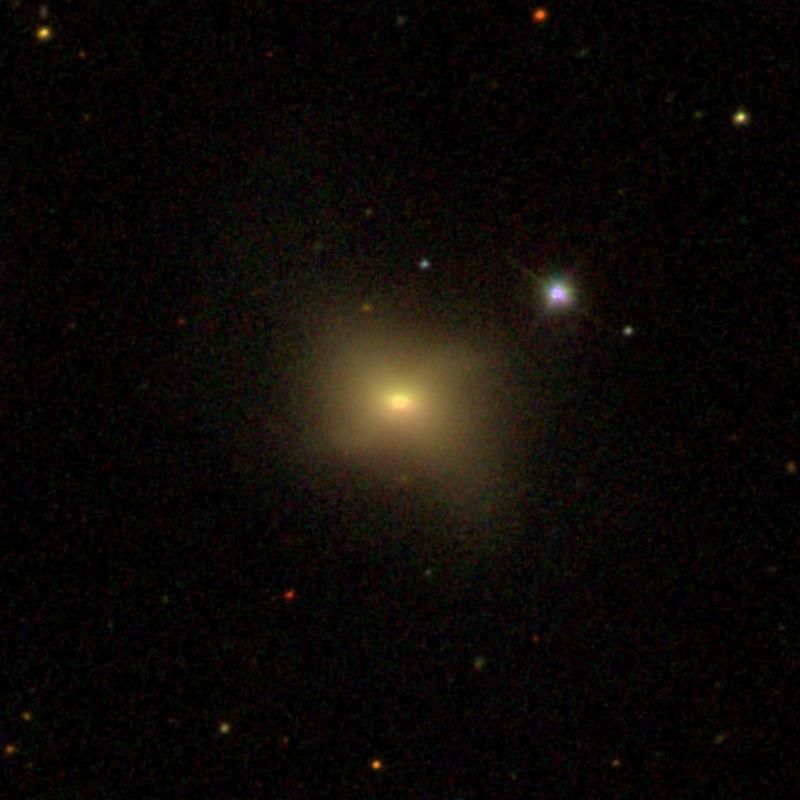
- SDSS view of NGC 481

Observation data (J2000 epoch)
- Constellation: Cetus
- Right ascension: 01^{h} 21^{m} 12.54^{s}
- Declination: −09° 12′ 39.9″
- Redshift: 0.01846 ± 0.00010
- Heliocentric radial velocity: (5482 ± 30) km/s
- Distance: 229 Mly
- Apparent magnitude (V): 13.5

Characteristics
- Type: SA(r)0- pec?
- Apparent size (V): 1.7′ × 1.3′

Other designations
- PGC 4899, MCG -02-04-030, 2MASX J01211246-091240

NGC 481 is an elliptical galaxy in the constellation Cetus. It is located approximately 229 million light-years from Earth and was discovered on November 20, 1886 by astronomer Lewis A. Swift.

== See also ==
- List of galaxies
- List of NGC objects (1–1000)

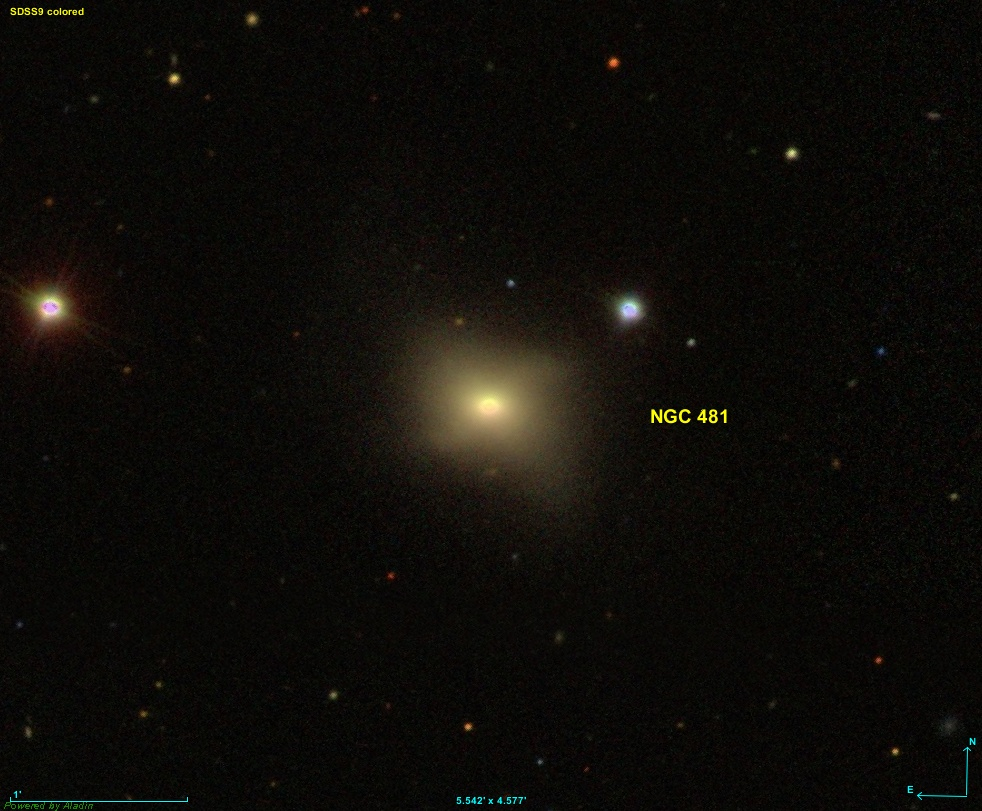
NGC 481 (SDSS)
