= TN J0924−2201 =

Galaxy in the constellation Hydra

Observation data (J2000 epoch)
- Constellation: Hydra
- Right ascension: 09^{h} 24^{m} 19.92^{s}
- Declination: −22° 01′ 41.5″
- Redshift: 5.19
- Distance: 12.5 billion ly (3.8 billion pc) (light travel distance); 26.2 billion ly (8.0 billion pc) (comoving distance)
- Apparent magnitude (V): 24

Characteristics
- Type: radio galaxy

Other designations
- OMB2006 1396

TN J0924−2201 is one of the most distant radio galaxies known to date. It was discovered by Wil van Breugel in 1999.

== See also ==
- List of galaxies

| Preceded by | Most distant radio galaxy | Succeeded by current |
