= 3C 411 =

Radio galaxy located in the constellation Delphinus

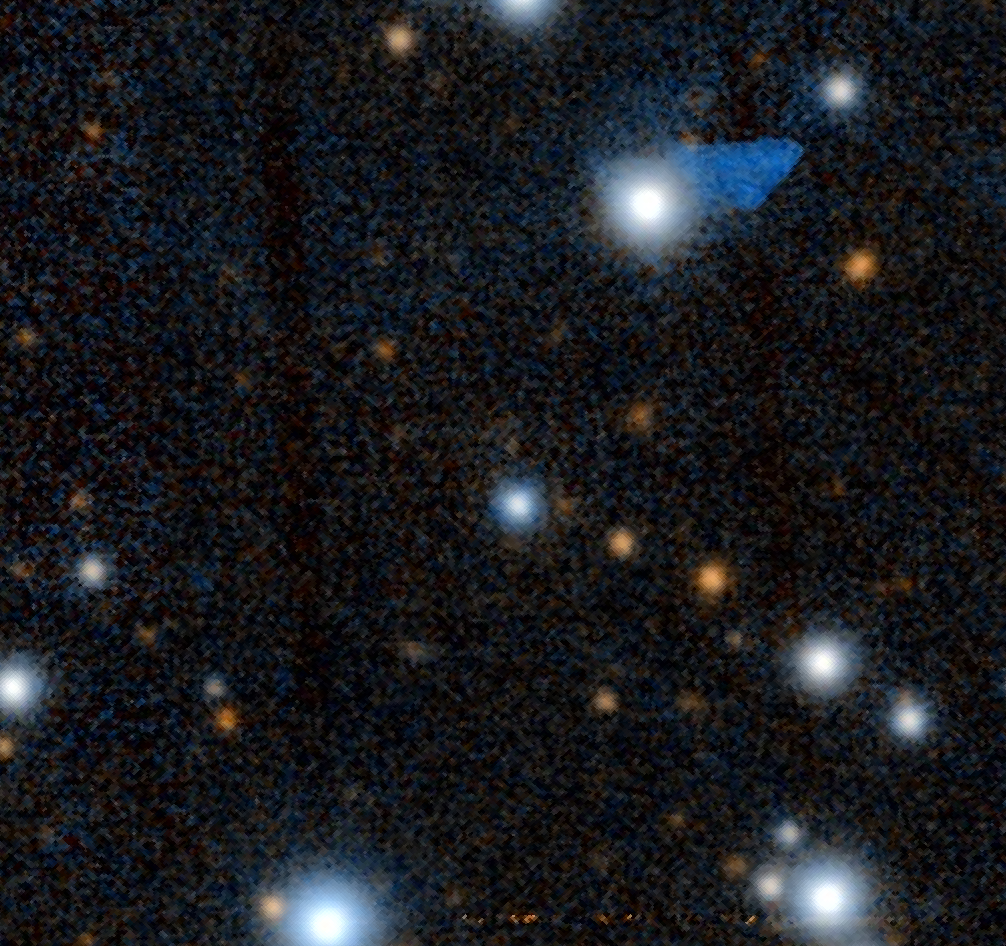
- Pan-STARRS image of 3C 411.

Observation data (J2000.0 epoch)
- Constellation: Delphinus
- Right ascension: 20^{h} 22^{m} 08.43^{s}
- Declination: +10° 01′ 11.26″
- Redshift: 0.467000
- Heliocentric radial velocity: 140,003 km/s
- Distance: 4.947 Gly
- Apparent magnitude (B): 19.70

Characteristics
- Type: N galaxy HEG

Other designations
- 4C +09.67, PKS 2019+09, LEDA 2817722, PKS B2019+098, NVSS J202208+100110, OW +032, DA 512, NRAO 0627, TXS 2019+098

3C 411 is a high-excitation Fanaroff-Riley class Type 2 radio galaxy (HEG) located in the constellation of Delphinus. The estimated redshift for this galaxy is (z) 0.467 and it was first recorded in the Third Cambridge Catalogue of Radio Sources in 1962. It was classified as an extragalactic radio source in 1974 by astronomers, before being identified as an N galaxy, that is described to have a distant redshift based on an observation by Hyron Spinrad.

== Description ==
3C 411 is a broad-line radio galaxy (BLRG). It is found to contain a double lobed source. When observed through radio mapping, the source is found to contain a radio emission bridge of low surface brightness connecting the components, with a nuclear point source dominating over the optical object. Imaging by the Very Large Array (VLA) in 1984 showed the source is heavily depolarized with the radio spectrum steepening outside the location of its hotspots. A radio jet is also shown linking with a central component with the hotspot feature that is located in the western radio lobe. At 15 GHz the source also shows signs of spectra steepening in both of its lobes.

An observation conducted in 2014 by XMM Newton found 3C 411 is a flat-spectrum radio quasar. It is found to have a cold accretion disk around its central supermassive black hole. The estimated mass of the black hole is 3 × 10^{7} M_{☉}, and the object has a total flux density of 2.20 ± 0.16 × 10^{−12} erg cm^{−2} s^{−1}. A double power-law component was also found in 3C 411, mainly made up of a hard component and a Seyfert type-like component.

In March 2019 the object was thought to have a blazar core in its center. However when observed, its jet is shown as straight on a trajectory path with an inclination angle at 50°. Although Very Long Baseline Interferometry (VLBI) observations found the core as compact, it is found to be modelled by multiple jet components instead of a blazar jet, ruling out the possibly of it being classified as a blazar.
