= 3C 318 =

Quasar in the constellation Serpens

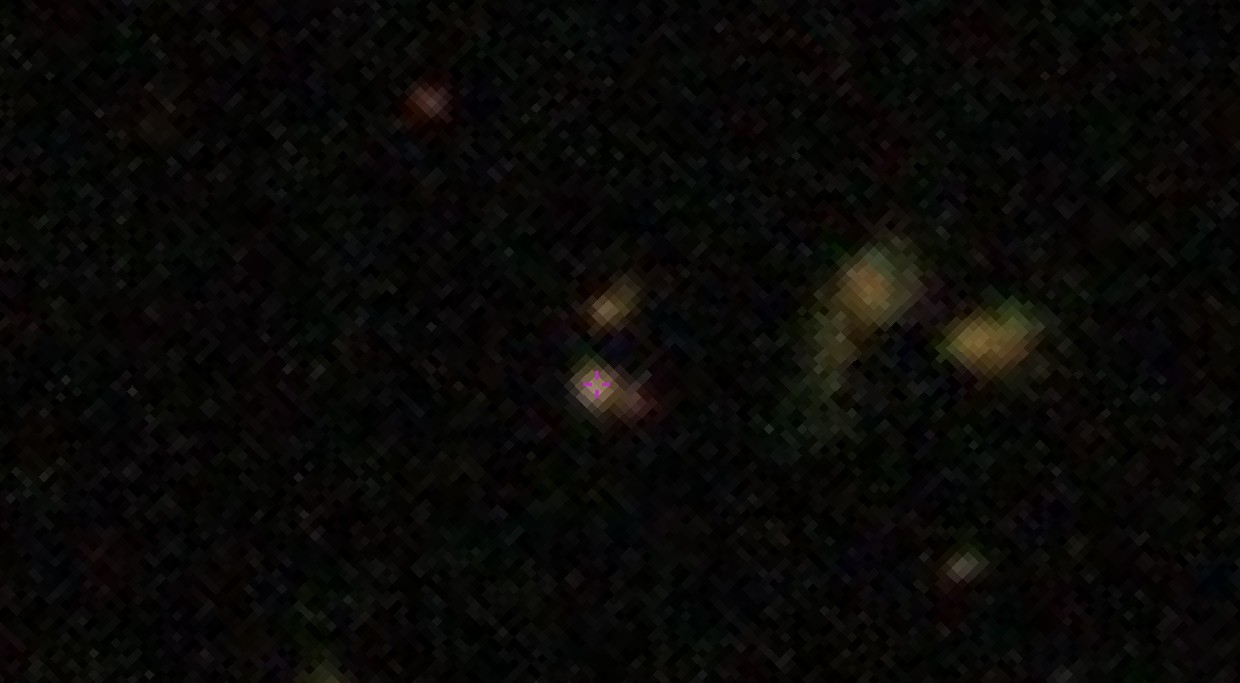
- The quasar 3C 318.

Observation data (J2000.0 epoch)
- Constellation: Serpens
- Right ascension: 15^{h} 20^{m} 05.460^{s}
- Declination: +20° 16′ 05.58″
- Redshift: 1.572248
- Heliocentric radial velocity: 471,348 km/s
- Distance: 9.235 Gly
- Apparent magnitude (V): 20.9
- Apparent magnitude (B): 21.93

Characteristics
- Type: CSS

Other designations
- LEDA 2817670, OHIO R 229, DA 381, CTA 68, 4C 20.35, NRAO 476, TXS 1517+204, PKS 1517+204

3C 318 is a quasar located 9.2 billion light years in the constellation of Serpens. This radio-loud and luminous object has a redshift of (z) 1.574, and is classified as a compact steep-spectrum source (CSS). It is described as an N galaxy, first discovered by astronomers, Hyron Spinard and H.E. Smith in 1976 but also a radio galaxy.

== Description ==
3C 318 contains a triple source with an inclusion of a much weaker component located north based on Very Large Array (VLA) observations. A polarization observation by MERLIN also suggested the source has a weak radio core, an extended southwest radio lobe and a jet that is one-sided towards northeast. Very Long Baseline Interferometry radio imaging also found the quasar has a triple structure described as asymmetric with a central component likely containing the core. There is a jet emerging from the north-eastern component of the core region. The brightest component found at 8.4 GHz, has a polarization percentage of 10. There is an offset continuum-subtracted line emitter from its nucleus by 0.33 arcseconds with a projection of 2.82 kiloparsecs.

Molecular gas observations on the quasar showed it to have an estimated mass of (3.0 ± 0.6) × 10^{10} M_{☉}. In additional, there are both position and velocity offsets between the gas and the quasar itself, indicating it might be undergoing a major galaxy merger. Results also showed the object also has a gas depletion timescale of 20 million years and a star formation rate of 1700 M_{☉} yr^{−1}. The quasar is also thought to be one of the infrared sources; however later observations showed that most emission originated from a pair of interacting galaxies at redshift (z) 0.35.

Ionized gas outflows were also discovered in the quasar by Atacama Large Millimeter Array (ALMA). These outflows are estimated to extending towards both northeast and southwest directions with an extent of 3.2 kiloparsecs. Band 4 observations conducted by ALMA also showed the quasar has an extended molecular emission with two offset components located west and south by 1.7 and 17 kiloparsecs respectively.
