= LBG-2377 =

Distant galaxy merger

Observation data (J2000 epoch)
- Constellation: Hercules
- Right ascension: 16^{h} 44^{m} 48.3^{s}
- Declination: +46° 27′ 08.2″
- Redshift: 3.03
- Distance: 11.4 billion light-years (3.5 billion parsecs) (light travel distance); ~21.2 billion light-years (6.5 billion parsecs) (present proper distance)
- Apparent magnitude (V): 22.6

Characteristics
- Type: Galaxy merger, Lyman-break galaxy, galaxy protocluster

Other designations
- PC 1643+4631A-2377

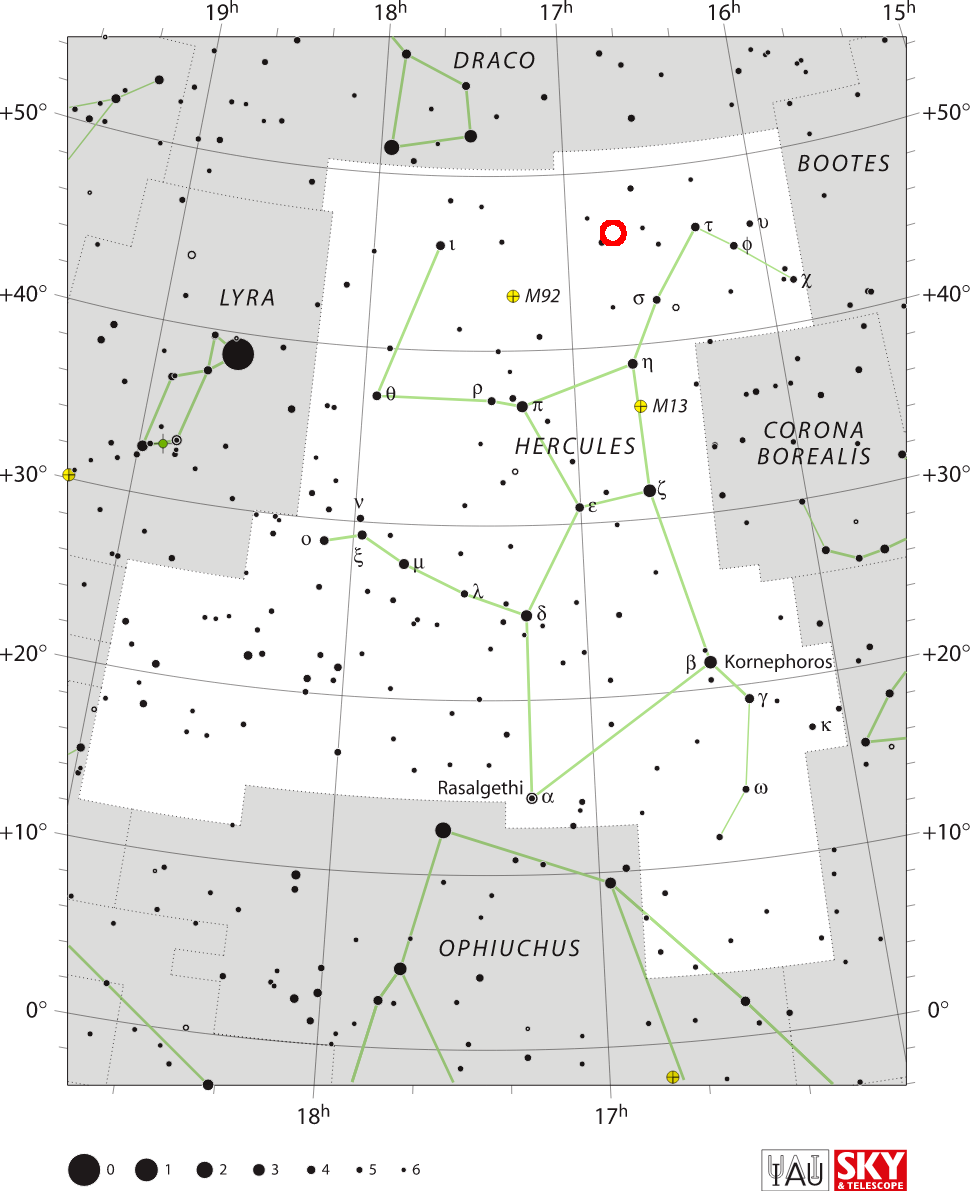
The location of LBG-2377 (circled in red)

LBG-2377 is the most distant galaxy merger discovered, as of 2008, at a distance of 11.4 billion light years. This galaxy merger is so distant that the universe was in its infancy when its light was emitted. It is expected that this galaxy proto-cluster will merge to form a brightest cluster galaxy, and become the core of a larger galaxy cluster.

== Discovery ==
Observations were conducted with the Keck Telescope in Hawaii by Jeff Cooke, a McCue Postdoctoral Fellow in physics and astronomy at UCI. While looking for single galaxies, Cooke found something that at first appeared like a bright, single object. However, further analysis of wavelengths of the emitted light proved that they were three galaxies merging, and likely two smaller galaxies.

== See also ==
- List of galaxies
- Antennae Galaxies
- Galaxy cluster
