= NGC 4860 =

Galaxy in the constellation Coma Berenices

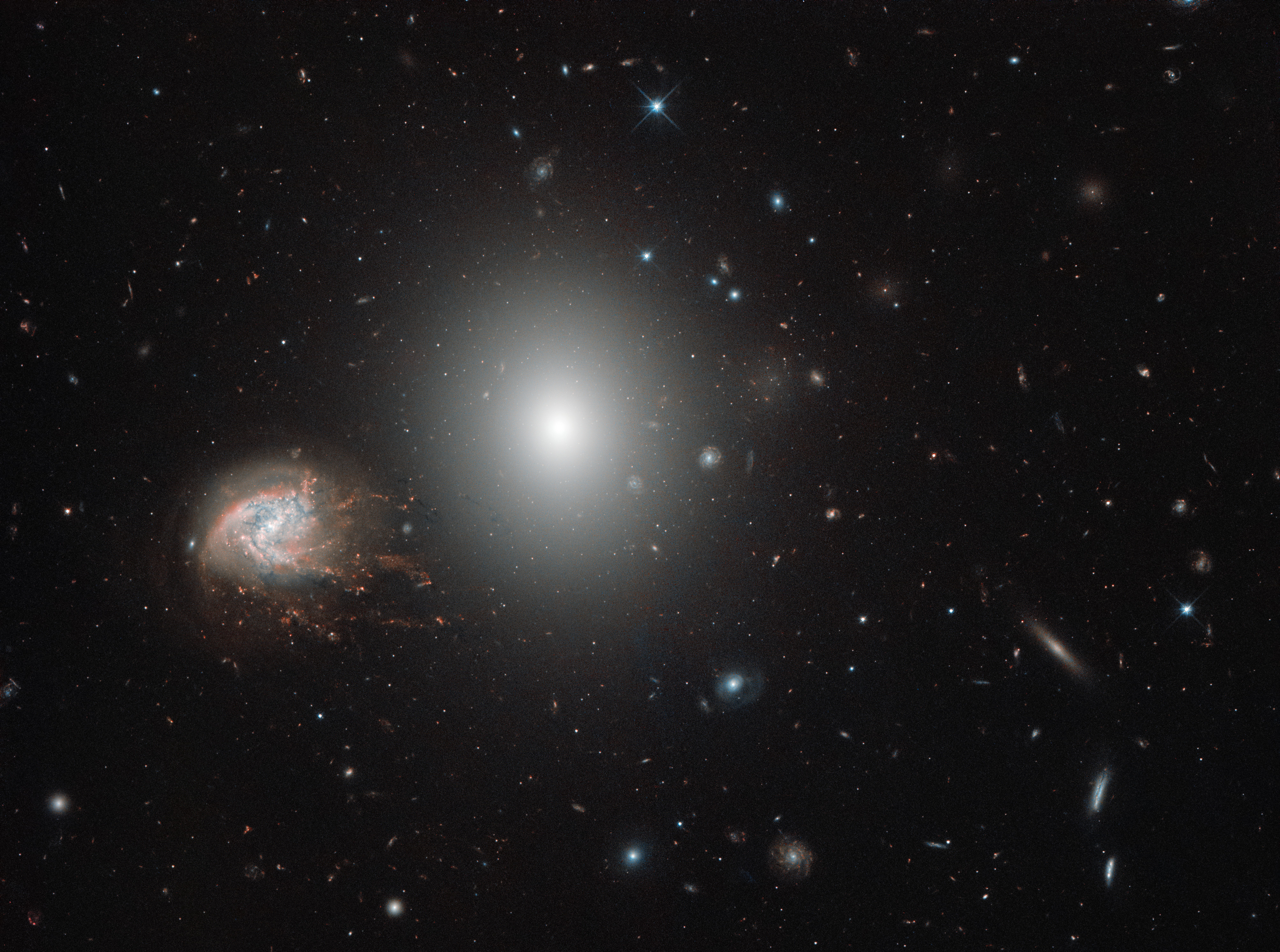
- Elliptical galaxy NGC 4860 (center) and spiral galaxy NGC 4858 (left).

Observation data (J2000 epoch)
- Constellation: Coma Berenices
- Right ascension: 12^{h} 59^{m} 03.91^{s}
- Declination: +28° 07′ 25.3″
- Redshift: 0.02645
- Heliocentric radial velocity: 7825 km/s
- Distance: 360 Mly (110 Mpc)
- Group or cluster: Coma Cluster
- Apparent magnitude (V): 13.5
- Apparent magnitude (B): 14.5

Characteristics
- Type: E2
- Apparent size (V): 0.8' × 0.65'

Other designations
- MCG +05-31-054, PGC 44539

NGC 4860 is an elliptical galaxy in the constellation Coma Berenices. The galaxy was discovered on 21 April 1865 by Heinrich Louis d'Arrest.

With its distance from Earth being approximately 110 million parsecs, NGC 4860 belongs to the Coma Cluster, which consists of over 1,000 identified galaxies.

== See also ==
- List of galaxies
- Comet Galaxy
