= PKS 1614+051 =

Quasar in the constellation of Hercules

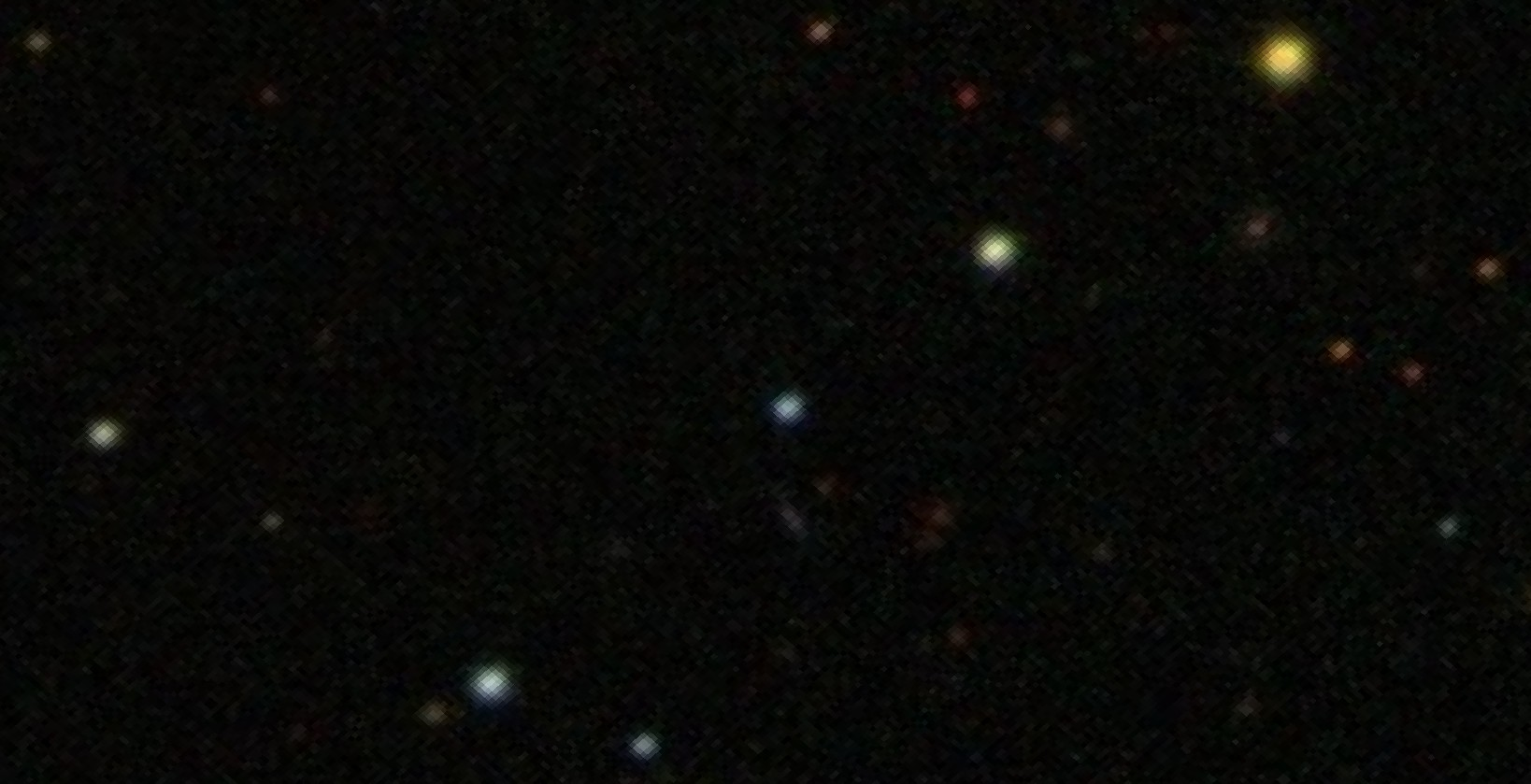
- The quasar PKS 1614+051.

Observation data (J2000.0 epoch)
- Constellation: Hercules
- Right ascension: 16^{h} 16^{m} 37.556^{s}
- Declination: +04° 59′ 32.736″
- Redshift: 3.215000
- Heliocentric radial velocity: 963,833 km/s
- Distance: 11.323 Gly
- Apparent magnitude (V): 19.17

Characteristics
- Type: GPS FRSQ

Other designations
- PMN J1616+0459, OS +023, IRCF J161637.5+045932, RX J1616.6+0459, FIRST J61637.5+045932, NVSS J161637+045933, TXS 1614+051

PKS 1614+051 is a distant quasar located in the constellation of Hercules. The redshift for this object is (z) 3.21 and it was first identified by astronomers in 1983. It is classified as a radio-loud quasar and contains a radio spectrum that appears as flat. It is also referred as a high frequency peaker and a gigahertz peaked-spectrum source, making it one of the most powerful sources known.

== Description ==
PKS 1614+051 is variable on the electromagnetic spectrum. When shown on a multi-wavelength light curve, the object displays flux density variations usually slow, with one flaring period which was detected at 5–22 GHz frequencies and started towards the end of 2009. At 37 GHz, PKS 1614+051 showed a flare in January 2014 and several faint localized flares detected in 2009, 2020 and 2022. Observations also showed it has a low variability level of 0.02 and a short variability time of 12 days.

The structure of PKS 1614+051 is compact. When detected in radio imaging, the source is found to have double morphology, consisting of an inverted spectrum radio core and a secondary component which is located 0.8 arcseconds away from it at a position angle of -30°. Very Long Baseline Interferometry (VLBI) observations conducted in 1992, found an elongated beam in the structure, orientated at -11°. This suggests the structure might be aligned together with its arc-scale structure. When imaged by Very Long Baseline Array (VLBA) at 8.4 GHz, the source shows a bright north component and a slightly resolved structure located south-west. Polarization was also detected in several components inside the core region.

Two Faraday components were detected in PKS 1614+051 with rotation measures (RM) of 2100 rad m^{−2} and 500 rad m^{−2}. These suggested two reasons; either they are associated with two foreground layers (depolarization by RM gradients or through external beam depolarization) or by two inner layers which emit radiation and rotate at same time intervals, via two synchrotron components present in the quasar's radio spectrum.

== Companion galaxy ==
A narrow emission line object was discovered close to PKS 1614+051 at redshift (z) 3.218 in 1985. Based on spectroscopy and photometry studies, the object was found not a separate quasar nor a gravitational lensed image, but a mildly active galaxy of either LINER or Type 2 seyfert, proposed by S. Djorgovski. Named 1614+051A, the galaxy is described to be radio-quiet and shows detections of doubly ionized oxygen and Hydrogen beta emission.

Ground-based observations suggested the galaxy might be interacting with PKS 1614+051. A detection of a 50 kiloparsec Lyman-alpha gas bridge between it and the quasar by Multi-Object Spectroscopic Explorer (MUSE) would later confirm this theory. Evidence also points out that the gas is extending towards two other companion galaxies, suggesting the interaction is not affecting only the main companion galaxy.
