= NGC 1701 =

Spiral galaxy in the constellation Caelum

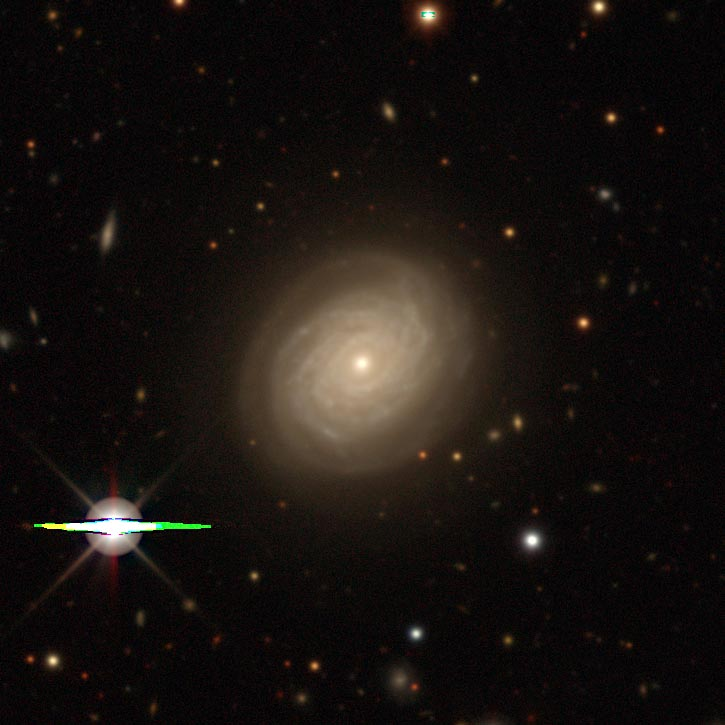
- NGC 1701 imaged by Legacy Surveys

Observation data (J2000 epoch)
- Constellation: Caelum
- Right ascension: 04^{h} 55^{m} 51.1486^{s}
- Declination: −29° 53′ 00.980″
- Redshift: 0.019467±0.0000800
- Heliocentric radial velocity: 5,836±24 km/s
- Distance: 280.8 ± 19.7 Mly (86.08 ± 6.05 Mpc)
- Apparent magnitude (V): 12.8
- Apparent magnitude (B): 13.6
- Surface brightness: 22.65 mag/arcsec^{2}

Characteristics
- Type: (R)SA(r)b
- Size: ~170,500 ly (52.28 kpc) (estimated)
- Apparent size (V): 1.2′ × 0.9′

Other designations
- ESO 422-11, IRAS 04539-2957, MCG -05-12-10, PGC 16352

NGC 1701, also known as the Trekkie Galaxy, is a large unbarred spiral galaxy located in the constellation Caelum. Its speed relative to the cosmic microwave background is 5,836 ± 24 km/s, which corresponds to a Hubble distance of 86.1 ± 6.0 Mpc (~281 million ly). It was discovered by British astronomer John Herschel on 6 November 1834.

The luminosity class of NGC 1701 is II and it has a broad HI line.

The galaxy's nickname is a reference to the registry of the fictional USS Enterprise (NCC-1701) from the Star Trek media franchise.

== Supernova ==
One supernova has been observed in NGC 1701:

- SN 2026dpg (Type Ia-91T-like, mag. 16.949) was discovered by ATLAS on 18 February 2026.

== See also ==
- List of NGC objects (1001–2000)
- List of spiral galaxies
