= B2 0902+34 =

Radio galaxy located in the constellation Lynx

Observation data (J2000.0 epoch)
- Constellation: Lynx
- Right ascension: 09^{h} 05^{m} 30.10^{s}
- Declination: +34° 07′ 56.92″
- Redshift: 3.395
- Heliocentric radial velocity: 1,013,898 km/s
- Distance: 11.440 Gly (light travel time-distance)
- Apparent magnitude (V): 23.80
- Apparent magnitude (B): 24.0

Characteristics
- Type: Radio galaxy HEG

Other designations
- NVSS J090530.1+340756, 7C 0902+3420, TXS 0902+343, VLSS J0905.5+3407, 87GB 090225.3+341952, IVS B0902+343

B2 0902+34 is a radio galaxy located in the constellation of Lynx. The redshift of the object is (z) 3.395 and it was discovered in October 1988, by S. J. Lilly who identified its astronomical radio source with a faint galaxy counterpart, making it the most distant when found at that period.

== Description ==
B2 0902+34 is classified as a high redshift radio galaxy with a small radio source. Its radio structure is bizarre with a long radio emission plume described as extending beyond the hot spot regions located in northern direction. There is a bright jet found having a knotty appearance with an extent of 1.5 arcseconds in length. Radio imaging showed the jet has a bending angle of almost 90° at its northern end, while the source's southern half shows two distinctive components separated by 1 arcsecond from each other. A flat-spectrum radio core is located between the optical peaks, in a valley area. The most interesting feature of B2 0902+34, are the large observed rotation measures and rotation gradients, as seen in the northern hot spot region, by multifrequency polarized imaging. A fuzzy emission region is located north-east of the galaxy's two regions according to Hubble Space Telescope imaging.

Observations by Very Large Array made in February 2024, showed there are detections of absorption lines due to presence of carbon monoxide and cyano radical elements, associated together with B2 0902+34. The carbon absorption of the galaxy has two components with one of them located at the same redshift as the 21 centimeter neutral hydrogen gas absorption. Non-continuum emission at 2.9 millimeters was detected as well apart from carbon absorption, with source coinciding with a component seen on centimeter wavelengths. This component is likely interpreted as either the nucleus or the base of the jet.

It is theorized B2 0902+34 might be a giant elliptical protogalaxy based on its spectrum, its luminosity of its continuum source, and the fact it shows a collapsing structure and large quantity of interstellar gas. Apart from that, the galaxy has a Lyman-alpha emission halo with an extended radius of 50 kiloparsecs and velocity dispersion of 250 kilometer per seconds. Located in its spatially resolved region, a second feature is detected with a blueshifted line profile. It is suggested as either H I absorption or secondary emission. According to studies, the galaxy is undergoing a wave of star formation which started 3 billion years ago.

An observation by Chandra X-ray Observatory found B2 0902+34 is an obscured active galaxy. Based on studies, it has an unresolved X-ray source located in the center of its active galactic nucleus, with the spectrum of the source having well-fitted power law photon index measuring Γ~ 1.1 and intrinsic luminosity of 3.3 × 10^{45} erg s^{−1}. A large emission-line nebula is seen surrounding the galaxy, extending 10" × 8" on the sky's projection.
