= NGC 5861 =

Galaxy in the constellation Libra

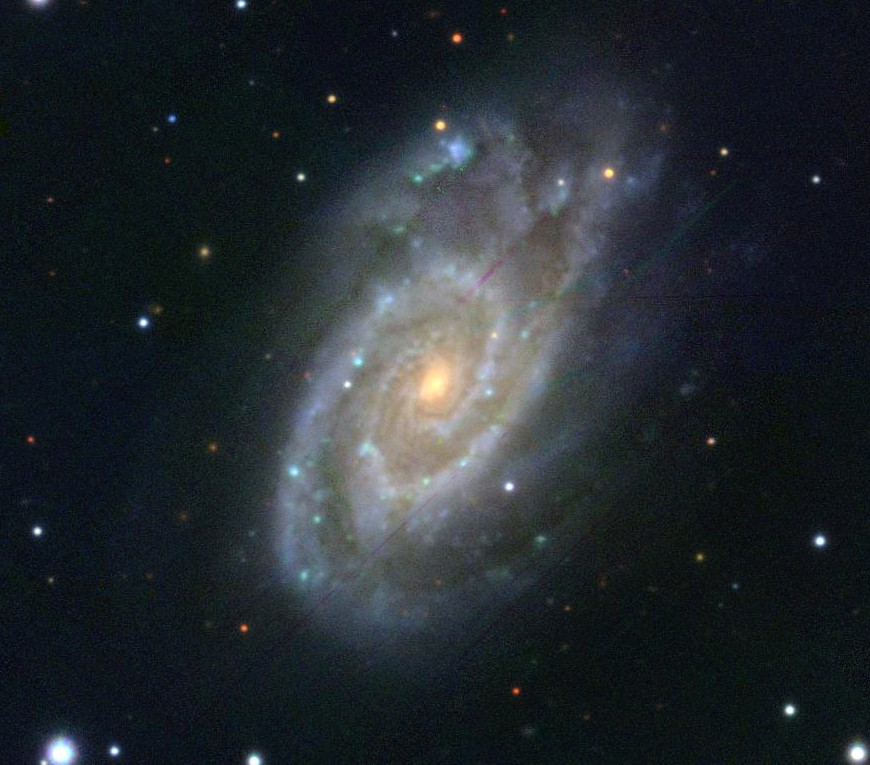
- NGC 5861 imaged by PanSTARRS

Observation data (J2000 epoch)
- Constellation: Libra
- Right ascension: 15^{h} 09^{m} 16.0974^{s}
- Declination: −11° 19′ 18.089″
- Redshift: 0.006174±0.000003
- Heliocentric radial velocity: 1,851±1 km/s
- Distance: 82.80 ± 2.64 Mly (25.387 ± 0.809 Mpc)
- Apparent magnitude (V): 11.6
- Magnitude (J): 9.623
- Magnitude (H): 8.941
- Magnitude (K): 8.699

Characteristics
- Type: SAB(rs)c
- Size: ~108,000 ly (33.11 kpc) (estimated)
- Apparent size (V): 3.0′ × 1.7′

Other designations
- IRAS 15065-1107, MCG -02-39-003, PGC 54097

NGC 5861 is an intermediate spiral galaxy in constellation Libra. It is located at a distance of about 85 million light years from Earth, which, given its apparent dimensions, means that NGC 5861 is about 80,000 light years across.

Center image by Hubble Space Telescope

The galaxy features two long spiral arms that dominate the optical disk. The one arm can be traced from its beginning at the center for nearly one and a half revolutions without branching, whereas the other starts to form fragments after one revolution, forming a moderately chaotic pattern. The galaxy hosts a hydroxyl megamaser.

NGC 5861 is the foremost member of a small galaxy group that also includes NGC 5858, which lies 9.6 arcmin north, forming a non-interactive pair. It is located within the same galaxy cloud with NGC 5878.

NGC 5861 is considered to be a Seyfert II Galaxy and HII galaxy.

== Supernovae ==
Two supernovae have been observed in NGC 5861:

- SN 1971D (type unknown, mag. 15.5) was discovered by Glenn Jolly and Justus R. Dunlap on 24 February 1971. Observations by Hubble Space Telescope indicate that possibly there is a light echo created by SN 1971D.
- SN 2017erp (Type Ia, mag. 16.8) was discovered by Kōichi Itagaki on 13 June 2017.

== See also ==
- List of NGC objects (5001–6000)
