= Q0051-279 =

Distant quasar

Observation data (Epoch J2000)
- Constellation: Sculptor
- Right ascension: 00^{h} 54^{m} 15.4^{s}
- Declination: −27° 42′ 08″
- Redshift: 4.43

Q0051-279 is a distant quasar. At the time of its discovery in 1987, the quasar was the furthest astronomical objects ever discovered, with a redshift of 4.43.
