= NGC 5917 =

Spiral galaxy in the constellation Libra

- NGC 5917 imaged by the Hubble Space Telescope

Observation data (J2000 epoch)
- Constellation: Libra
- Right ascension: 15^{h} 21^{m} 32.550^{s}
- Declination: −07° 22′ 37.52″
- Redshift: 0.00635
- Heliocentric radial velocity: 1,934.1
- Distance: 90.4 ± 6.2 Mly (27.73 ± 1.90 Mpc)
- Apparent magnitude (V): 14.5
- Apparent magnitude (B): 13.7

Characteristics
- Type: Sb pec:
- Apparent size (V): 1.60′ × 0.9′
- Notable features: Interacting galaxy

Other designations
- GSC 05014-00224, IRAS F15188-0711, 2MASX J15213256-0722376, NGC 5917, LEDA 54809, MCG -01-39-002, PGC 54809

NGC 5917 is a spiral galaxy located in the constellation of Libra. It was discovered by English astronomer John Herschel on 16 July 1835. This galaxy is located at a distance of 90.4 ± 6.2 million light-years (27.73 ± 1.90 Mpc) from the Milky Way, and is receding with a heliocentric radial velocity of 1,934.1 km/s. It is interacting with the neighboring galaxy, PGC 54817, at an angular separation of 4.2′. Tidal tails extend from PGC 54817 to the halo of NGC 5917.

One supernova has been observed in NGC 5917. SN 1990Q (Type II, mag. 18) was discovered by Christian Pollas on 24 June 1990.
