= UGC 9391 =

Magellanic spiral galaxy in the constellation Draco

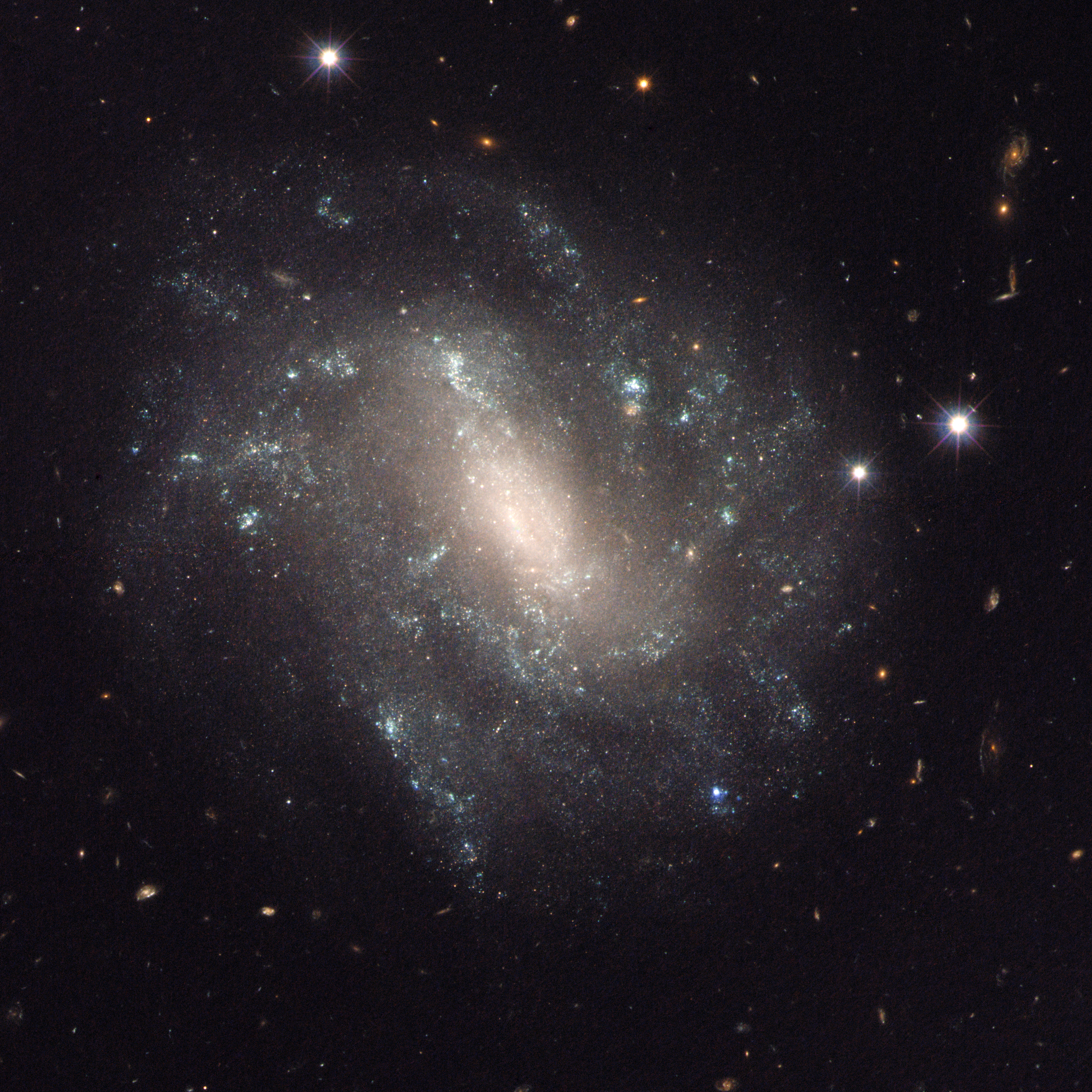
- UGC 9391 imaged by the Hubble Space Telescope

Observation data (J2000 epoch)
- Constellation: Draco
- Right ascension: 14^{h} 34^{m} 37.013^{s}
- Declination: 59° 20^{m} 16.174^{s}
- Redshift: 0.00649
- Heliocentric radial velocity: 1,939 km/s
- Distance: 78.8 Mly (24.15 Mpc)
- Apparent magnitude (B): 15.5

Characteristics
- Type: SBdm
- Apparent size (V): 1.85′ × 1.85′

Other designations
- UGC 9391, MCG +10-21-011, PGC 52091

UGC 9391 is a Magellanic spiral galaxy in constellation Draco. 130 million light years from Earth, it is not a member of any group of galaxies, and is moving away from the Earth at 1939 km/s.

In 2003, a supernova catalogued as SN 2003du was detected within the galaxy, with an apparent magnitude of 15.9.

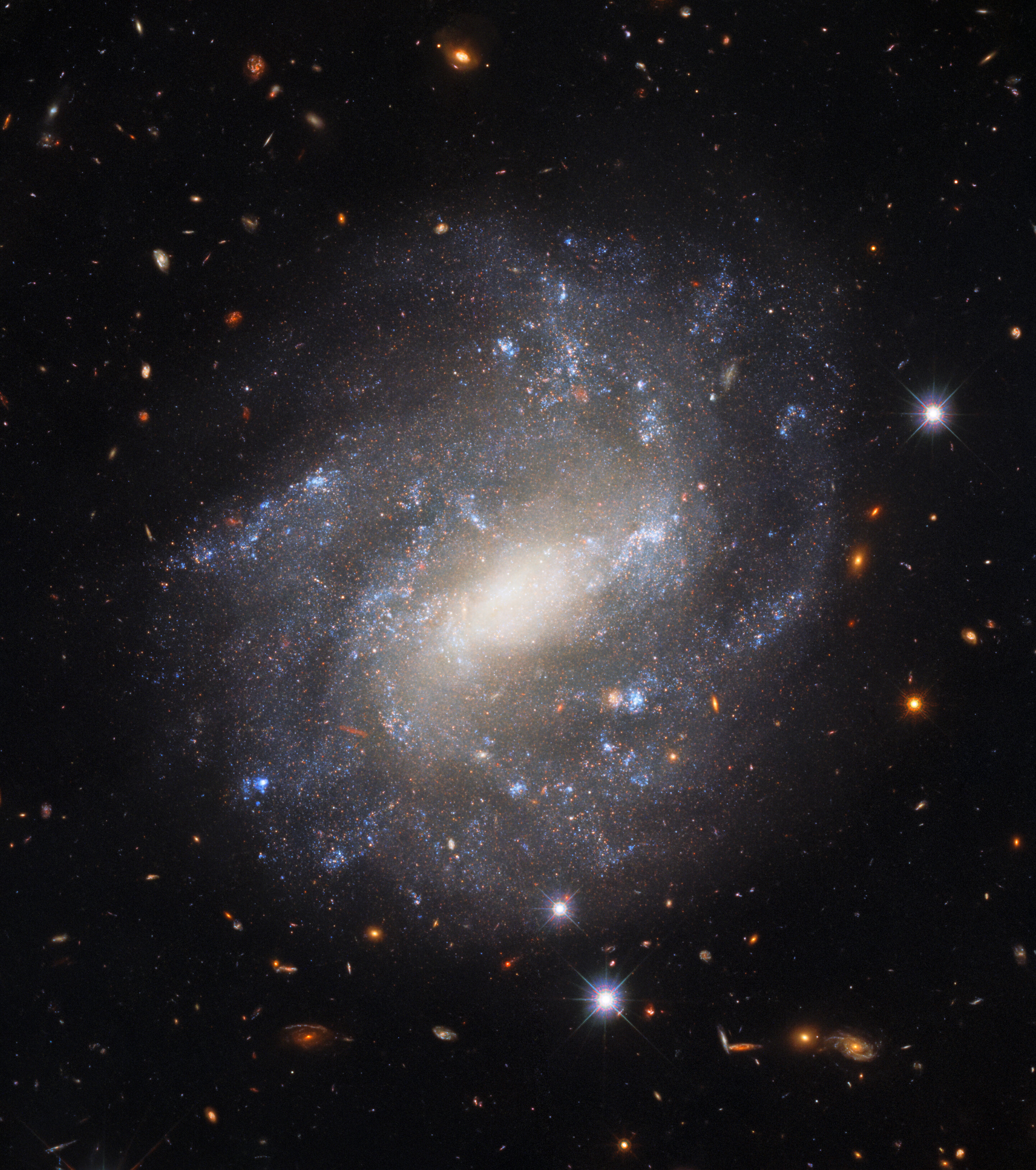
This galaxy resides 130 million light-years from Earth in the constellation Draco near the north celestial pole.
