= NGC 5829 =

Galaxy in the constellation Boötes

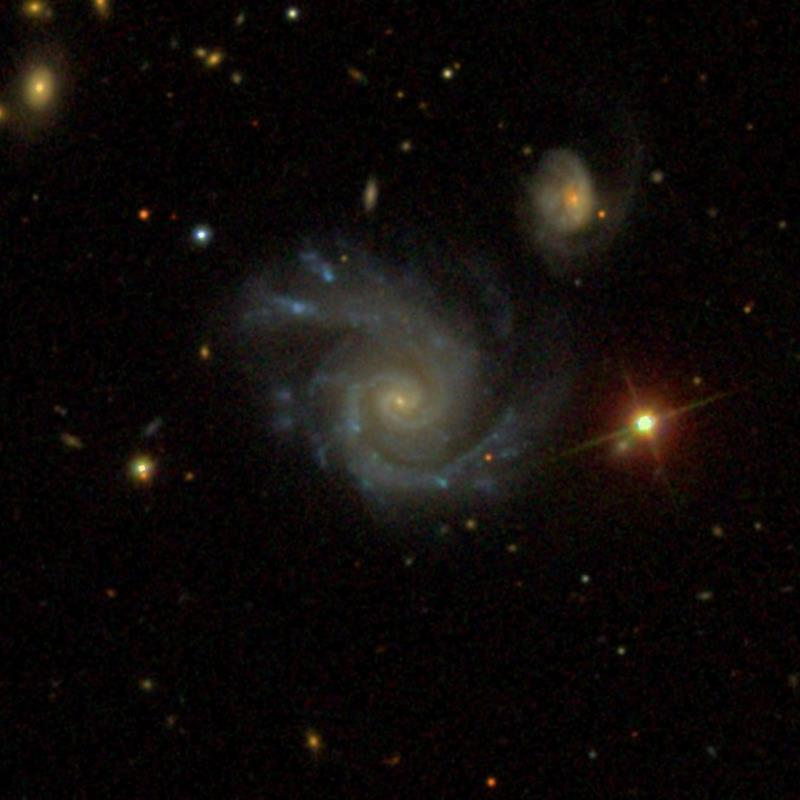
- NGC 5829 by SDSS

Observation data (J2000 epoch)
- Constellation: Boötes
- Right ascension: 15^{h} 02^{m} 42.0^{s}
- Declination: +23° 20′ 00.0″
- Redshift: 0.018797
- Apparent magnitude (V): 14.1

Characteristics
- Type: SA(s)c
- Apparent size (V): 81.20″ by 63.64″
- Notable features: Interacting with the galaxy IC 4526

Other designations
- VV 7, LEDA 53709, Z 134-70, Arp 42, 2MASX J15024196+2320009, UGC 9673, HCG 73a, MCG+04-35-027, Z 1500.4+2331, CGCG 134.070, PGC 53709

NGC 5829 is a spiral galaxy located in the constellation Boötes. It is 281 million light-years away from Earth and was discovered by astronomer, Edouard Stephan in May 1882.

The luminosity class of NGC 5829 is III and it has an HI line with regions of ionized hydrogen. With a surface brightness of only 14.42 magnitude, NGC 5829 can be classified as a low-surface brightness galaxy.

NGC 5829 forms a galaxy pair Arp 42 with the irregular galaxy IC 4526. Although interacting, the two are not close since IC 4526 is located at a much further distance at 665 million light-years compared to NGC 5829.

== Hickson 73 ==
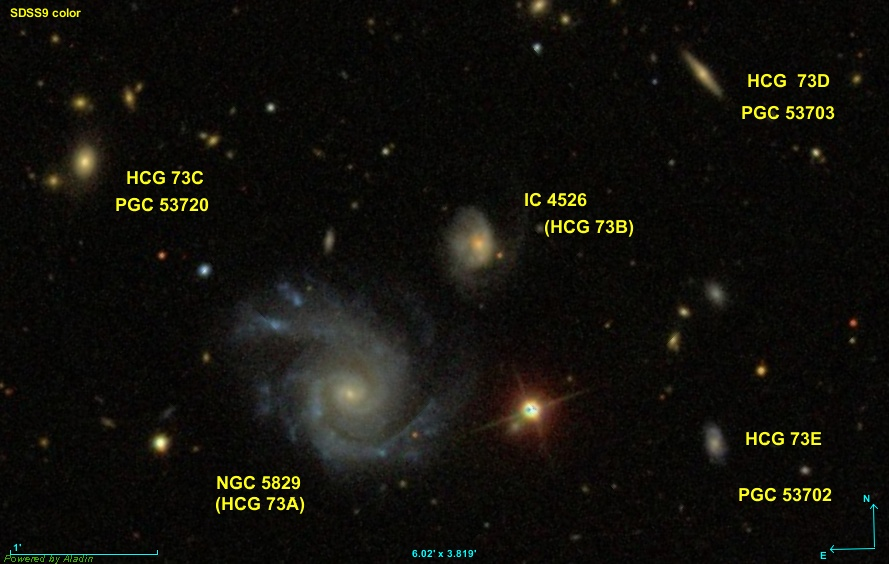
The five galaxies in Hickson Compact Group 73.

NGC 5829 is a member of Hickson Compact Group 73 alongside IC 4526. There are three other galaxies in the group: HCG 73C (PGC 53720), HCG 73D (PGC 53703) and HCG 73E (PGC 53702). But they are not an actual galaxy group since they lie at different redshifts.

== Supernova ==
One supernova has been discovered so far in NGC 5829: SN 2008B. It was found by a Japanese astronomer, Koichi Itagaki via unfiltered images taken in January 2008 in Yamagata, Japan. The supernova was located 23" east and 7" north of the nucleus, and confirmed to be classified as Type IIn.

== See also ==
- List of NGC objects (5001–6000)
