= UGC 4881 =

Peculiar galaxies in the constellation Lynx

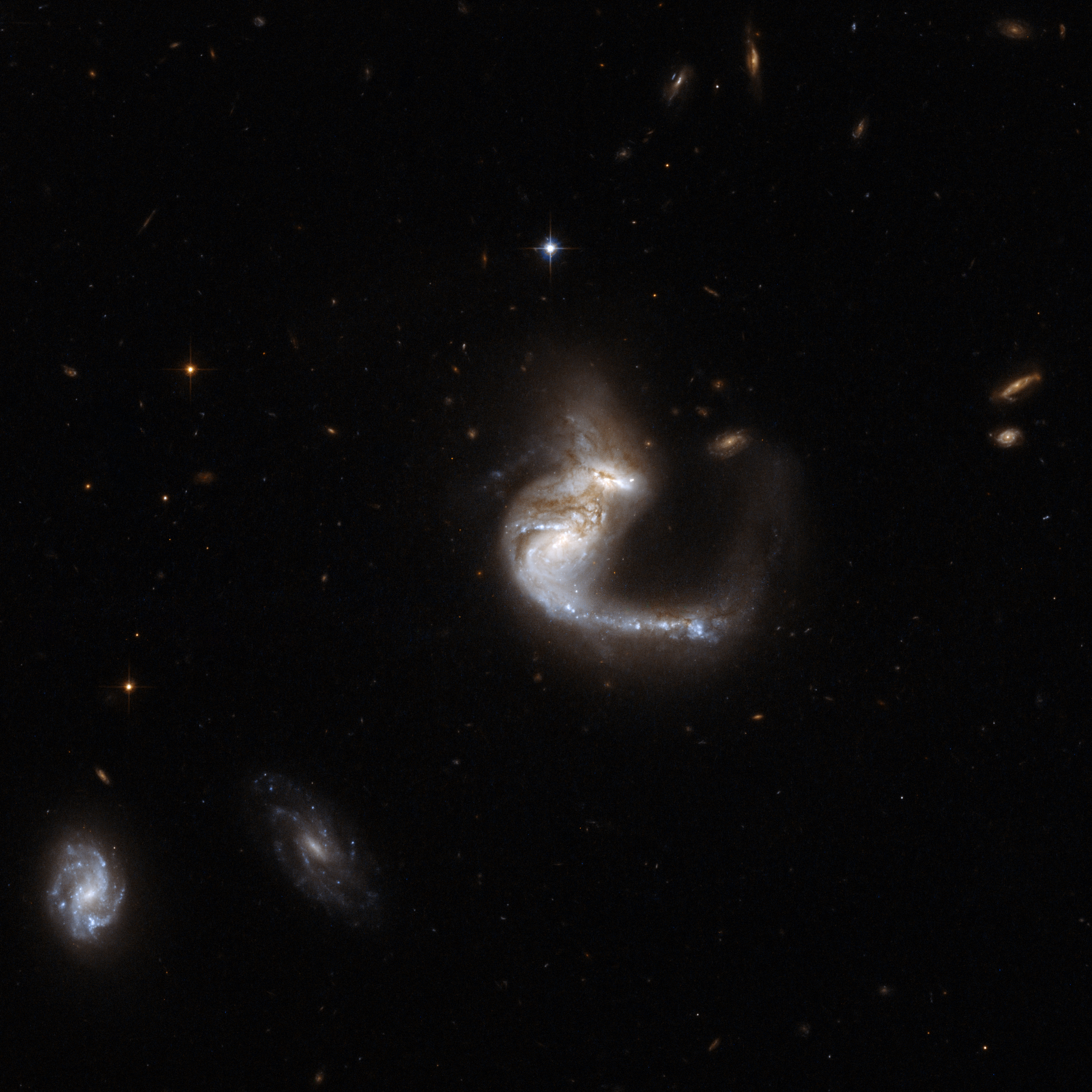
- UGC 4881 imaged by the Hubble Space Telescope. Note the long "tail".

Observation data (J2000 epoch)
- Constellation: Lynx
- Right ascension: 09^{h} 15^{m} 55.1918^{s}
- Declination: +44° 19′ 55.301″
- Redshift: 0.039270
- Heliocentric radial velocity: 11,773 km/s
- Distance: 575.9 ± 40.5 Mly (176.57 ± 12.41 Mpc)

Other designations
- IRAS 09126+4432, Arp 55, MCG +08-17-065, PGC 26132, CGCG 238-025, VV 155

UGC 4881 (also known as The Grasshopper) is a pair of interacting galaxies, UGC 4881A and UGC 4881B. They are located in the constellation Lynx, some 575 million light-years away. UGC 4881, the brighter, is a peculiar spiral galaxy. It has been heavily documented by the Hubble Space Telescope, and is cataloged in the Atlas of Peculiar Galaxies.

== Etymology ==
UGC 4881 was first given the nickname "The Grasshopper" by astrophysicist Dr. Boris Vorontsov-Velyaminov in a 1977 paper due to its resemblance to a grasshopper larva. It has also been informally called the "Shrimp galaxy" due to the curvature of the arm resembling a shrimp.

== Morphology ==
The two galaxy cores are the two brightest regions in the object. The cores of each merging galaxy are separated and distinct, but the disks of the galaxies have started to merge. Intense star formation is occurring, as seen by the bright blue line of clusters along the grasshopper's "tail". Three other faint galaxies are visible near UGC 4881 and form a group with it.

== Formation ==
UGC 4881 is believed to be in the process of merging, but the discs of the parent galaxies are overlapping while the cores are separated. A supernova exploded inside of UGC 4881 in 1999 and the galaxy is in the beginning of star formation.

== See also ==
- Halton Arp
- Starburst galaxy
