= NGC 4194 =

Interacting galaxy pair in the constellation of Ursa Major

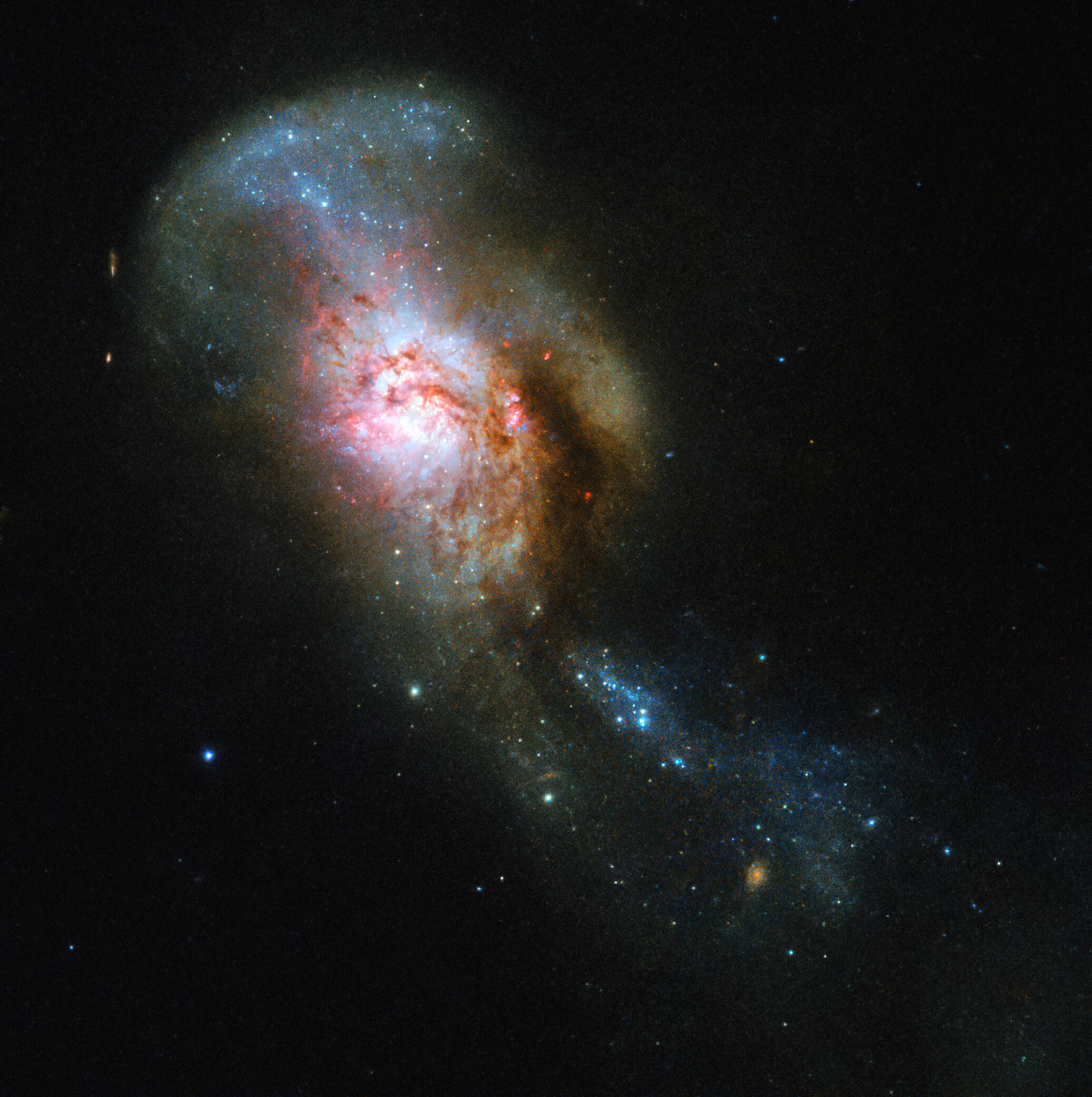

Observation data (J2000 epoch)
- Constellation: Ursa Major
- Right ascension: 12^{h} 14^{m} 09.64^{s}
- Declination: +54° 31′ 34.60″
- Redshift: 0.008433
- Heliocentric radial velocity: 2,511±12 km/s
- Distance: 128 Mly (39.1 Mpc)
- Apparent magnitude (V): 13.30
- Apparent magnitude (B): 13.79

Characteristics
- Type: Imeger
- Apparent size (V): 0.14′ × 0.13′
- Notable features: Interacting, starburst

Other designations
- Medusa galaxy merger, NGC 4194, Arp 160, UGC 7241, Mrk 201, PGC 39068

NGC 4194, the Medusa merger, is a galaxy merger in the constellation Ursa Major about 128 million light-years (39.1 Mpc) away. It was discovered on April 2, 1791 by German-British astronomer William Herschel. Due to its disturbed appearance, it is object 160 in Halton Arp's 1966 Atlas of Peculiar Galaxies.

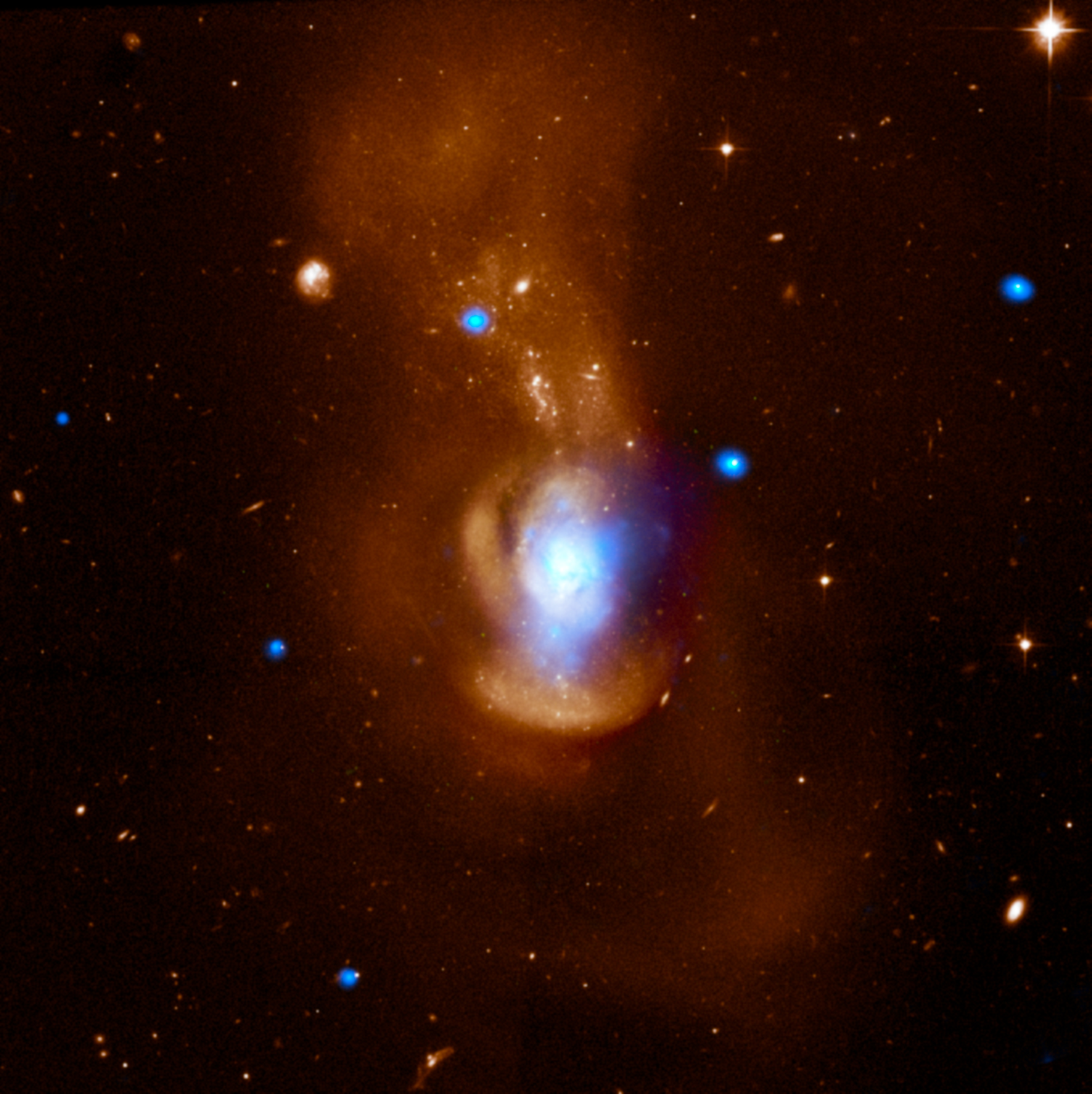
A black hole in Medusa's tail

The morphological classification of NGC 4194 is Imeger, indicating an irregular form. This galaxy consists of a brighter central region spanning an angular size 9″ across, with an accompanying system of loops and arcs. Additional material is thinly spread out to a radius of 75″ from the central region. There is a tidal tail and regions undergoing high levels of star formation, making this a starburst galaxy. It is a source for strong infrared and radio emission. These features indicate NGC 4194 is a late-stage galaxy merger. A region of extreme star formation 500 ly (150 pc) across exists in the center of the Eye of Medusa, the central gas-rich region.

Within 1.2 kpc (3.9 kly) of the dynamic center of NGC 4194, star formation is occurring at a rate of 8 M_{☉}·yr^{−1}. The star forming regions in this volume range from 5 to 9 million years in age, with the youngest occurring in areas of the highest star formation rate. As of 2014, no galactic nucleus has been detected based on radio emissions, nor have the respective nuclei of the merger galaxies. However, X-ray emission from a black hole in the tidal tail was detected by Chandra in 2009.
