= Ursa Major III =

Extremely faint candidate satellite galaxy of the Milky Way

Ursa Major III / UNIONS 1
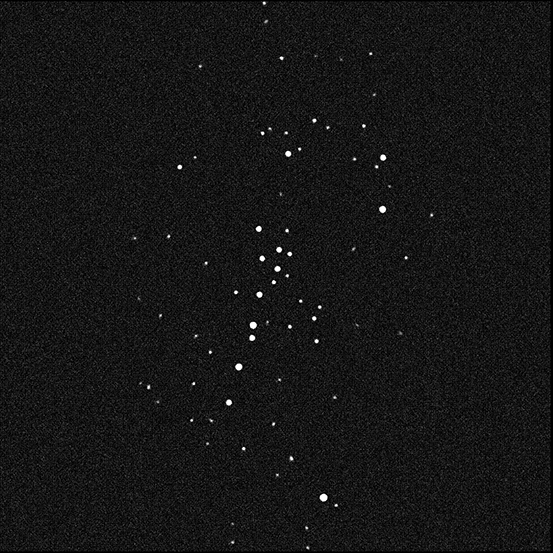
- Ursa Major III

Observation data (J2000 epoch)
- Constellation: Ursa Major
- Right ascension: 11^{h} 38^{m} 49.8^{s}
- Declination: +31° 04′ 42″
- Distance: 32.6±3.3 kly (10±1 kpc)
- Absolute magnitude (V): +2.2+0.4 −0.3

Characteristics
- Type: dSph
- Mass/Light ratio: 6500 M_{☉}/L_{☉}
- Number of stars: 57+21 −19
- Half-light radius (physical): 4.8 pc
- Half-light radius (apparent): 0.9′

Other designations
- UMa III, UNIONS 1

Location of Ursa Major III / UNIONS 1, a possible dwarf satellite galaxy near the Milky Way

Ursa Major III / UNIONS 1 (UMa III / U1) is a dwarf satellite galaxy of the Milky Way or a stellar cluster. If confirmed as a galaxy it would represent the smallest and faintest galaxy ever discovered, containing only about 60 star systems as opposed to hundreds of billions. It was found by the deep, wide field Ultraviolet Near Infrared Optical Northern Survey (UNIONS), a collaboration between the Canada–France–Hawaii Telescope and Pan-STARRS (two observatories in Hawaii) and spectroscopically confirmed as a real satellite based on data obtained with the Keck Observatory's Deep Imaging Multi-Object Spectrograph (DEIMOS).

Ursa Major III's discovery was announced in November 2023, with a paper appearing in The Astrophysical Journal in January 2024. It contains a metal-poor stellar population, indicating an extreme age of 11 billion years. Located about 32,600 light years away, it has a diameter of just 19.6 light years and is thought to contain only about 60 stars. Combined with its absolute magnitude of only +2.2, this makes it by far the Milky Way's dimmest satellite, and only about as bright as Altair. This absolute magnitude corresponds to a total luminosity of 11.4 L_{☉}.

Dynamical measurements of Ursa Major III / UNIONS 1's stars suggest it may have a mass-to-light ratio of about 6,500. However, this becomes only 1,900 with the removal of one of the stars suspected to be part of the system. This very high value may indicate the presence of a massive dark matter halo, suggesting that Ursa Major III could indeed be a true dwarf galaxy, albeit one with an extremely low stellar mass of 16 M_{☉}, making it the least massive Milky Way satellite known.

A 2025 study found the previous estimate of the stellar mass to be highly underestimated, since it does not account for the large number of compact stars within the galaxy, which make 50 to 80% of Ursa Major III's mass and are invisible by UNIONS. Accounting for this the stellar mass would be 142 M_{☉}. Simulations show UNIONS 1, without dark matter, can survive for 2.7 billion years with this higher mass. This is substantially larger than the 400 to 800 million years previously estimated, and as of such it can be a star cluster rather than a galaxy.
