= PKS 2000−330 =

Quasar

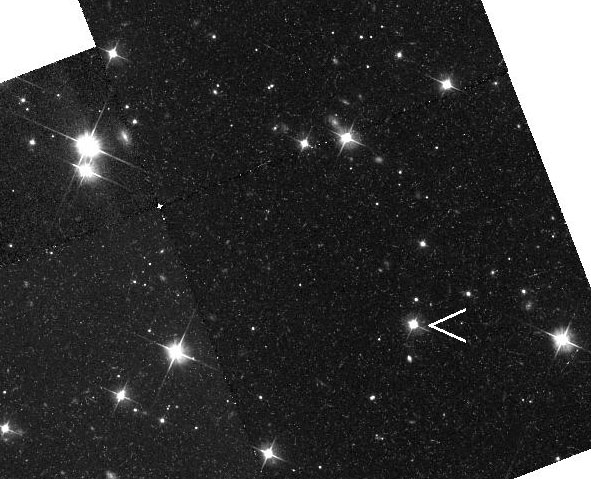
- Hubble Legacy Archive WFPC2 image of PKS 2000−330

Observation data (Epoch J2000)
- Constellation: Sagittarius
- Right ascension: 20^{h} 03^{m} 24.116^{s}
- Declination: −32° 51′ 45.13″
- Redshift: 3.773; 274,681 km/s
- Distance: 11.7 billion light-years (Light travel time); 22.7 billion light-years (present)
- Type: Quasar
- Apparent magnitude (V): 18.4 (SIMBAD); 19.0 (NED); 17.3 - 19.0

Other designations
- 2MASS J20032410−3251452, QSO B2000−330

PKS 2000−330 (also known as QSO B2000−330) is a quasar located in the constellation Sagittarius. When identified in 1982, it was the most distant and most luminous object known.

== Distance measurements ==
The "distance" of a far away galaxy depends on the distance measurement used. With a redshift of 3.77, light from this active galaxy is estimated to have taken around 11.7 billion years to reach us. But since this galaxy is receding from Earth at an estimated rate of 274,681 km/s (the speed of light is 299,792 km/s), the present (co-moving) distance to this galaxy is estimated to be around 22.7 billion light-years (6947 Mpc).

== See also ==
- List of the most distant astronomical objects
