= III Zw 2 =

Seyfert galaxy in the constellation Pisces

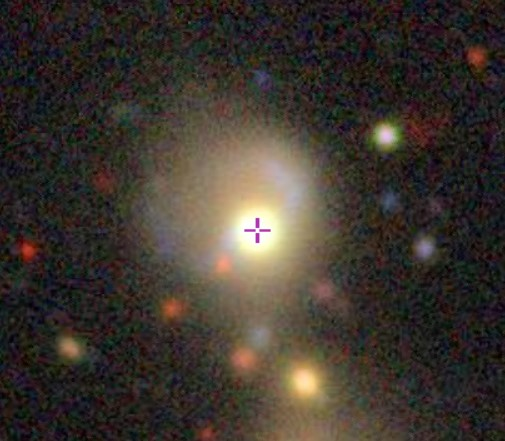
- III Zw 2 captured by DESI Legacy Surveys

Observation data (J2000.0 epoch)
- Constellation: Pisces
- Right ascension: 00^{h} 10^{m} 31.0^{s}
- Declination: 10° 58′ 29.5″
- Redshift: 0.089
- Distance: 1.09 Gly (334.2 Mpc)
- Apparent magnitude (V): 0.27
- Apparent magnitude (B): 0.36

Characteristics
- Type: Sy1.2
- Size: 67,500 ly in diameter
- Notable features: First seyfert galaxy to show a superluminal jet

Other designations
- PG 0007+106, Mrk 1501, PGC 737, RBS 0019, 2E 0029, NVSS J001030+105827

III Zw 2 is a Seyfert 1 galaxy located in the constellation Pisces. It has a redshift of 0.089 and is notable as the first of its kind to exhibit a superluminal jet.

== Discovery ==
III Zw 2 was first discovered by Fritz Zwicky via a 48-inch Schmidt survey as a stellar object with faint wisps. However, it was confirmed to have a Seyfert morphology with classical broadline characteristic based on further spectroscopic studies. It was also included in Palomar Green quasar sample.

== Characteristics ==
The host galaxy of III Zw 2 was initially classified as a spiral galaxy. However according to a recent study made on its budge and disk decomposition via Hubble Space Telescope in 2009, it has since been reclassified as an elliptical galaxy. It has a star-forming tidal bridge feature indicating a merger with a companion galaxy. Furthermore, III Zw 2 belongs to a class of radio-intermediate quasars and is a member of a triple galaxy system.

=== Active nucleus ===
The nucleus of III Zw 2 is active. In additional, to its superluminal jet, the galaxy shows two distinctive γ-ray flares happening between November 2009 and May 2010, according to observations by Fermi-LAT. It is also known to have a highly variable radio core flux density between factor of 20-30.

== Black hole ==
III Zw 2 contains a supermassive black hole of 7.4 × 10^{8} M_{☉}. The black hole is responsible for producing an ionized wind outflow with a velocity of (−1780 ± 670) km s^{−1}. Approximately every five years the galaxy emits dramatic radio outbursts.
