= NGC 105 =

Spiral Galaxy in the constellation Perseus

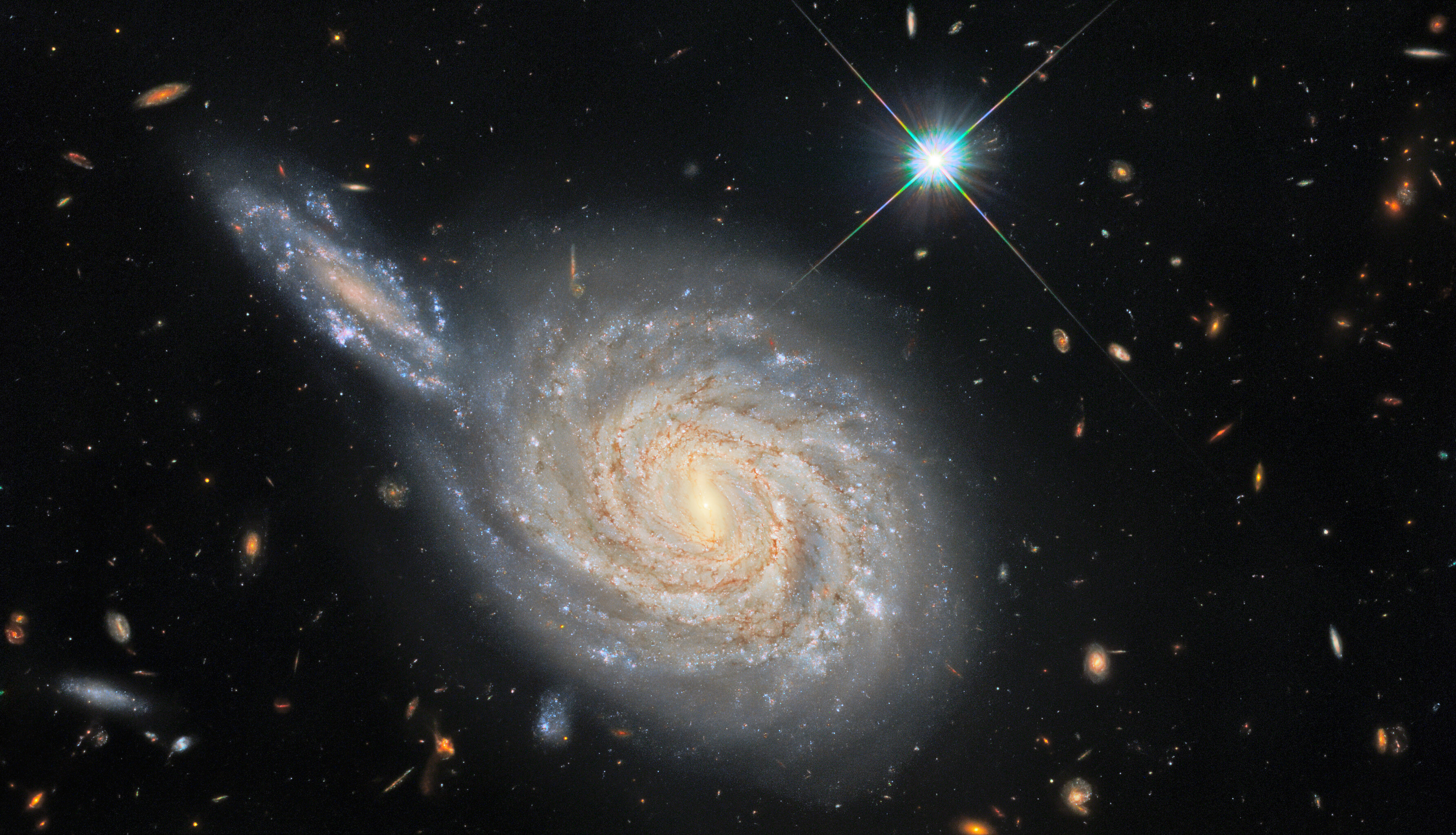
- Hubble Space Telescope image of NGC 105 (center) and PGC 212515 (upper left)

Observation data (J2000 epoch)
- Constellation: Pisces
- Right ascension: 00^{h} 25^{m} 16.791^{s}
- Declination: +12° 53′ 01.82″
- Redshift: 0.017646
- Heliocentric radial velocity: 5290 km/s
- Distance: 221.34 ± 34.29 Mly (67.864 ± 10.514 Mpc)
- Apparent magnitude (B): 14.1

Characteristics
- Type: Sab:
- Size: 83,700 ly (25,660 pc) (Note: POSS1 103a-O values used.)
- Apparent size (V): 1.1′

Other designations
- IRAS 00226+1236, UGC 241, MCG +02-02-008, PGC 1583, CGCG 434-009

NGC 105 is a spiral galaxy estimated to be about 240 million light-years away in the constellation of Pisces. It was discovered by Édouard Stephan in 1884 and its apparent magnitude is 14.1.

== Supernovae ==
Two supernovae have been observed in NGC 105:

- SN 1997cw (Type Ia, mag. 16.5) was discovered by the BAO Supernova Survey on 10 July 1997.
- SN 2007A (Type Ia, mag. 16) was discovered by Tim Puckett and Tom Orff, and independently discovered by the Lick Observatory Supernova Search (LOSS), on 2 January 2007.

== See also ==
- List of NGC objects (1–1000)
