= NGC 7250 =

Irregular galaxy in the constellation Lacerta

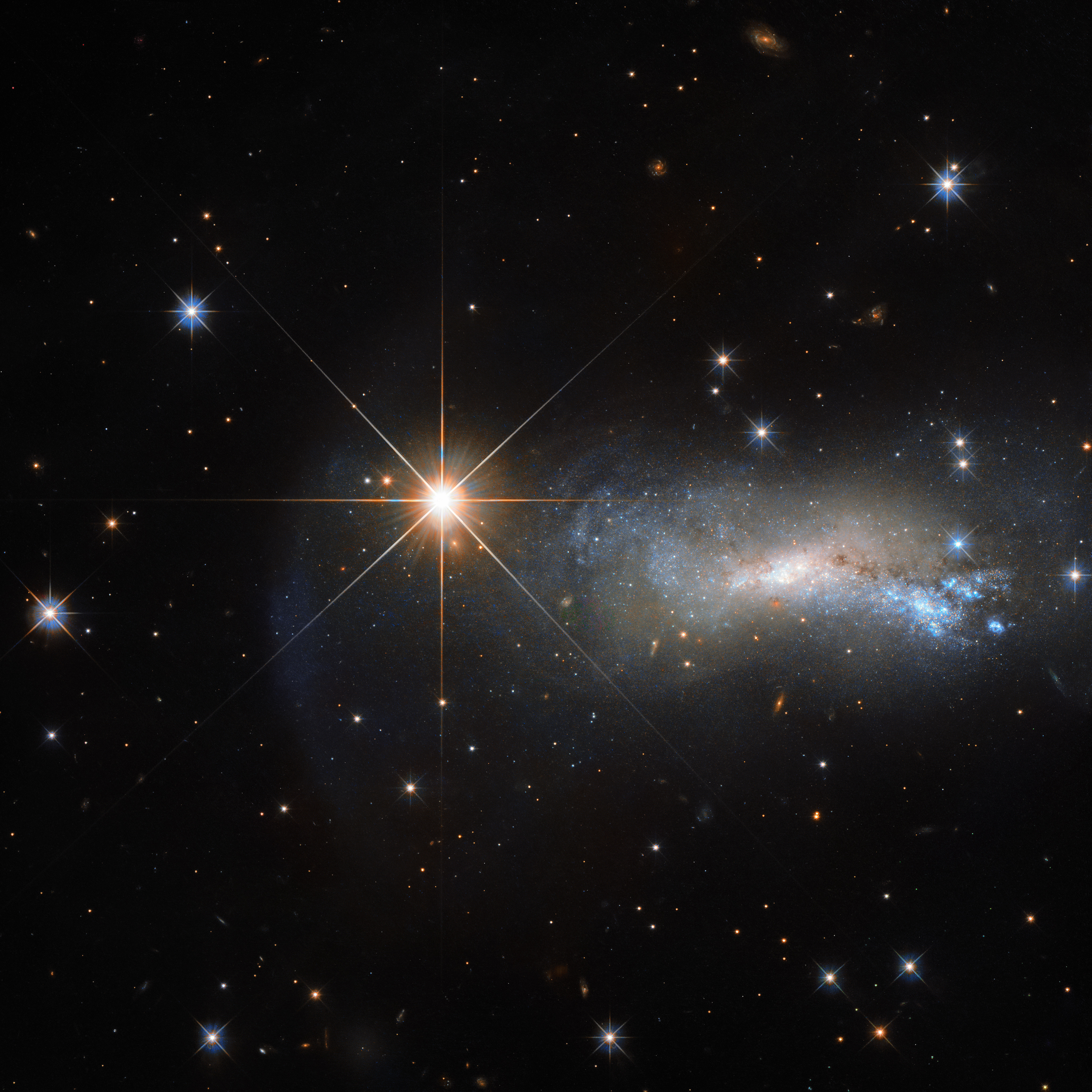
- NGC 7250 imaged by the Hubble Space Telescope

Observation data (J2000 epoch)
- Constellation: Lacerta
- Right ascension: 22^{h} 18^{m} 17.776^{s}
- Declination: +40° 33′ 44.66″
- Redshift: 0.0039
- Heliocentric radial velocity: 1,168 km/s
- Distance: 49.99 ± 14.37 Mly (15.328 ± 4.407 Mpc)
- Apparent magnitude (V): 12.58
- Apparent magnitude (B): 13.22

Characteristics
- Type: Irr
- Mass: 4.7×10^{8} M_{☉}
- Size: ~42,300 ly (12.97 kpc) (estimated)
- Apparent size (V): 1.7′ × 0.8′

Other designations
- PGC 68535, UGC 11980, MCG+07-45-024, Mrk 907, Z 530-22

NGC 7250 is an irregular galaxy located in the constellation Lacerta. It is a blue-colored galaxy with bright bursts of star formation: its star-forming rate is more than an order of magnitude greater than that of the Milky Way. It was discovered by German-British astronomer William Herschel on 8 November 1790.

The brighter star located in front of the galaxy is named TYC 3203-450-1, and is barely studied. It is about a million times closer to Earth than it the galaxy itself.

== Supernova ==
One supernova has been observed in NGC 7250. SN 2013dy (Type Ia, mag. 17) was discovered by the Lick Observatory Supernova Search (LOSS) on 10 July 2013. It was detected about 2.4 hours after the explosion, making it the earliest-known detection of a supernova at the time.

== See also ==
- List of NGC objects (7001–7840)
