= NGC 1015 =

Galaxy in the constellation Cetus

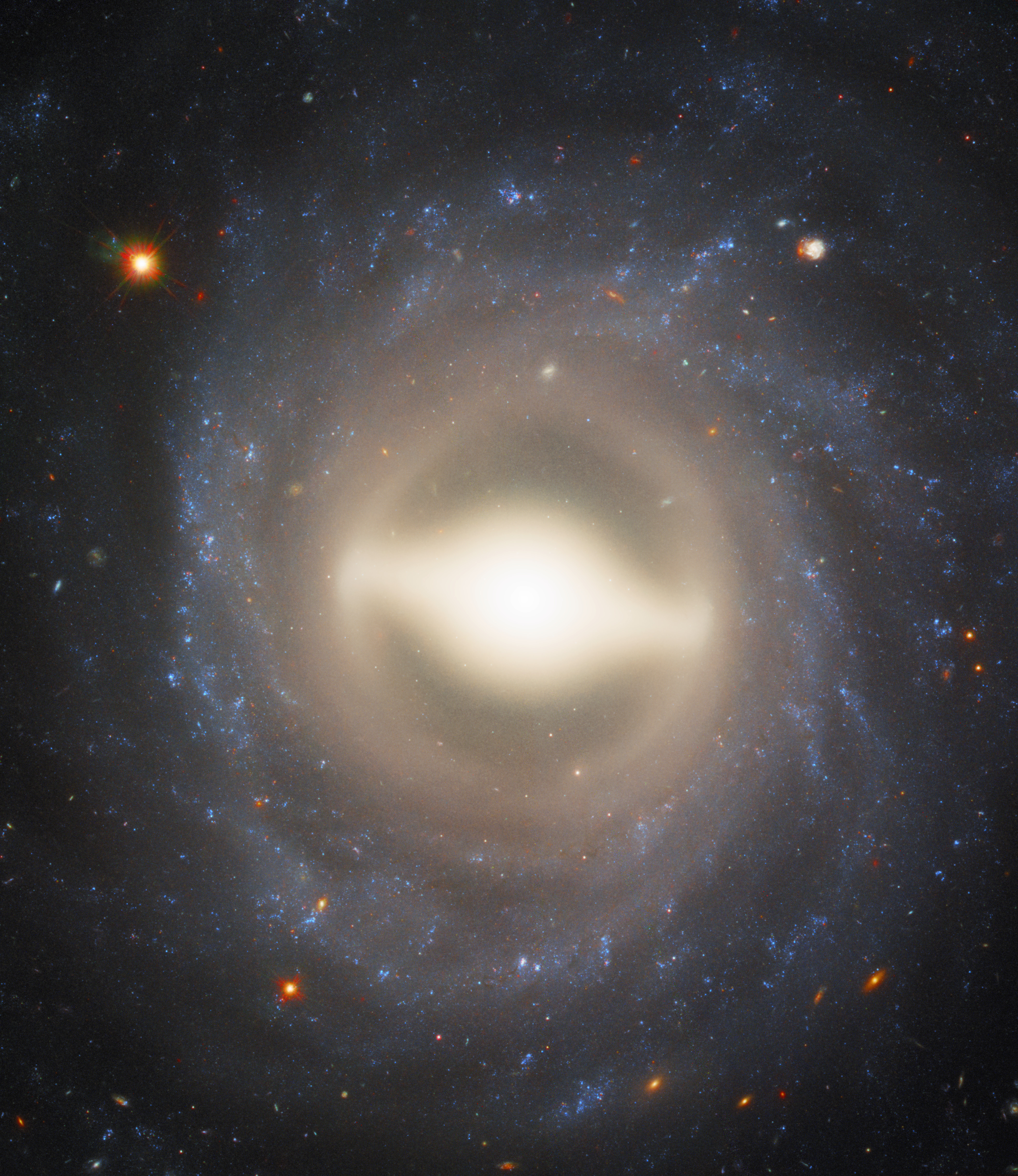
- NGC 1015 imaged by the Hubble Space Telescope

Observation data (J2000 epoch)
- Constellation: Cetus
- Right ascension: 02^{h} 38^{m} 11.552^{s}
- Declination: −01° 19′ 07.60″
- Redshift: 0.008776(4)
- Heliocentric radial velocity: 2625.7km/s
- Distance: 118 Mly (36.3 Mpc)
- Apparent magnitude (B): 12.8

Characteristics
- Type: Sb
- Apparent size (V): 163.88″

Other designations
- 2MASX J02381156-0119070, UGC 2124, LEDA 9988, MCG +00-07-066, SDSS J023811.55-011907.5

NGC 1015 is a barred spiral galaxy, at a distance of 118 million light years in the constellation of Cetus (The Whale). It was discovered by German astronomer Wilhelm Tempel on 27 December 1875. Emissions from the core region satisfy the criteria for an active galactic nucleus of type 2 Seyfert and a LINER galaxy.

== Supernova ==
One supernova has been observed in NGC 1015. SN 2009ig (Type Ia, mag. 17.5) was discovered by the Lick Observatory Supernova Search (LOSS) on 20 August 2009. It got as bright as magnitude 13, making it the brightest supernova of 2009.

== See also ==
- List of NGC objects (1001-2000)
