= Hyron Spinrad =

American astronomer

Hyron Spinrad (February 17, 1934 – December 7, 2015) was an American astronomer. His research has ranged from the study of planet atmospheres to the evolution of galaxies. From 2010 until his death in late 2015 he was an emeritus professor of astronomy at the University of California, Berkeley.

== Biography ==
Spinrad was born in New York in 1934. After his family moved to California, he received a Bachelor of Arts in astronomy at the University of California, Berkeley. Following graduation, he enrolled in the United States Army, and began work in the Army Map Service. After two years in the Army, he applied to and was accepted to the graduate program at Berkeley in 1957. He earned his Ph.D. in 1961, writing his thesis on stellar populations in galactic nuclei. He then took a position as a research scientist at the Jet Propulsion Laboratory, where he performed spectroscopic studies of Solar System planets and smaller bodies. In 1964 Spinrad was invited to return to Berkeley as a professor, and in 1968 he received tenure. He died December 7, 2015.

== Research ==
Spinrad pursued research in a variety of areas of astronomy, including stellar composition, the formation and evolution of galaxies, and the composition of the atmospheres of Solar System planets and comets. These diverse topics are united in that Spinrad primarily relied upon measurements of spectral lines (spectroscopy) in his work.

=== Galaxy formation and evolution ===
To study the formation of galaxies, Spinrad looked for distant galaxies. The more distant an object, the longer it takes light to reach Earth as a result of the speed of light being finite. In general, this allows astronomers to study objects as they were many millions or even billions of years ago. Spinrad originally selected targets by looking at the position of members of the Third Cambridge Catalogue of Radio Sources, as the catalogue included many radio galaxies that he thought would be at high redshift. The search was successful, and Spinrad found the galaxy with the highest identified redshift in 1975, and then found several more with greater redshifts, including the first identification of a galaxy with a redshift larger than z = 1. These discoveries helped show how galaxies have evolved throughout the history of the universe. For example, by measuring redshifts of sources in the Third Cambridge Catalogue of Radio Sources, it was possible to establish the number of such bright radio galaxies per volume in the universe as a function of its age, and find that there were hundreds as times as many radio galaxies at z $\approx$ 1 as there are today.

=== Solar System bodies ===
Spinrad spent much of his time at the Jet Propulsion Laboratory looking at the atmospheres of Solar System planets. He discovered water vapor in the atmosphere of Mars, and derived the abundance of carbon dioxide in Mars' atmosphere, from which he and his collaborators inferred that Mars has an atmosphere very much more tenuous than Earth's.

== Honors ==
- Asteroid 3207 Spinrad, discovered in 1981, was named for Hyron Spinrad
- Heineman Prize in 1986 for outstanding work in astrophysics
- Member of the National Academy of Sciences
