= List of the most distant astronomical objects =

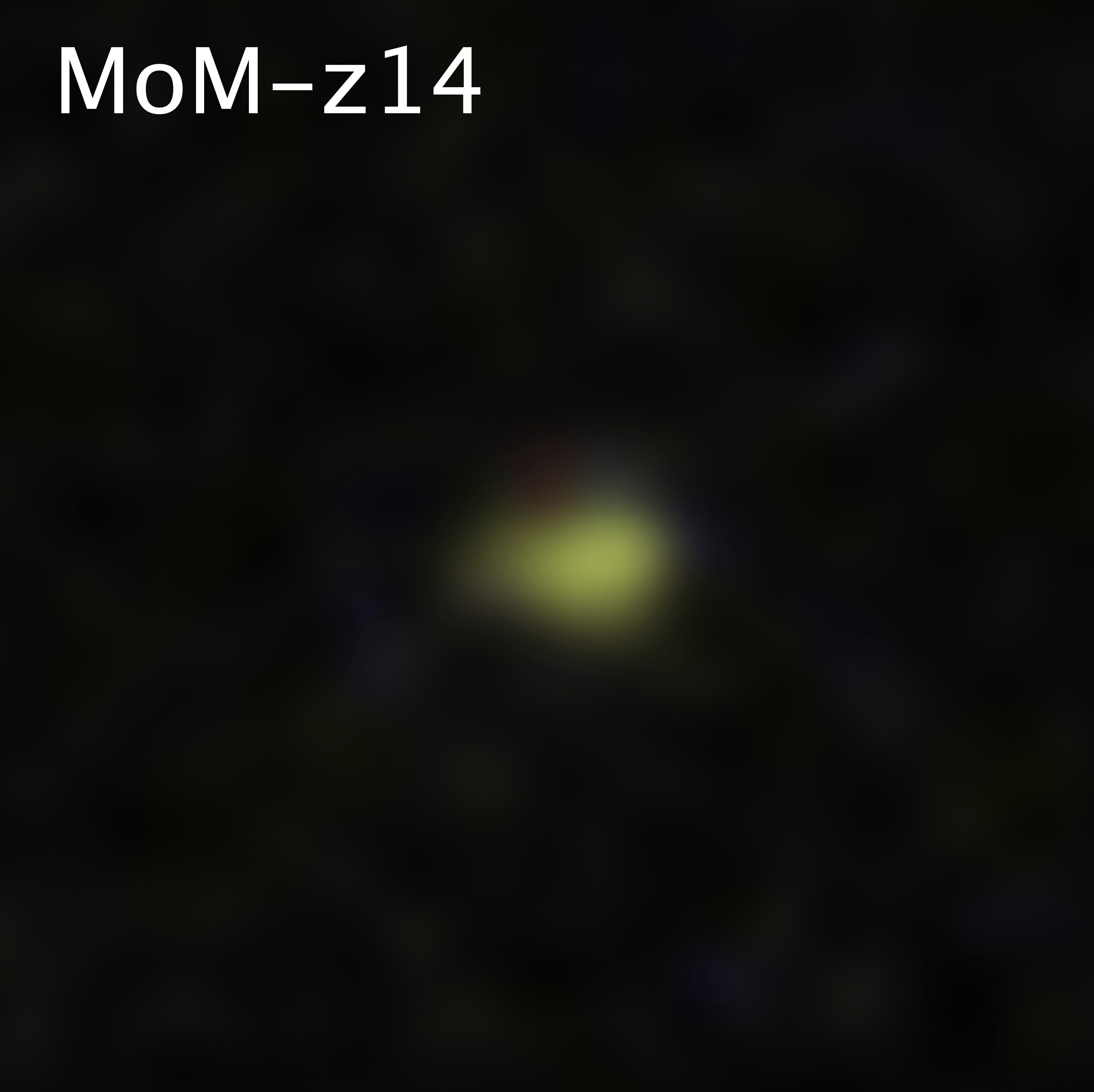
MoM-z14 has a redshift of 14.44, making it the most distant known galaxy as of May 2025. This image represents the galaxy as it was less than 280 million years after the Big Bang.

This article lists the most distant astronomical objects discovered and verified so far, and the time periods in which they were so classified.

An alternative to the most commonly used distance measurements for high redshift objects is to calculate their ages in relation to the Big Bang. For comparisons with the years after the Big Bang of the astronomical objects listed below, the age of the universe is currently estimated as 13.787 ± 0.020 billion years. However, the estimated age of the universe has increased over the years as the observational techniques have been refined. At the time of the discovery of IOK-1 in 2006, the estimated age was just 13.66 billion years.

Distances to remote objects, other than those in nearby galaxies, are nearly always inferred by measuring the cosmological redshift of their light. By their nature, very distant objects tend to be very faint, so these distance determinations are difficult and subject to errors. An important distinction is whether the distance is determined via spectroscopic or photometric redshift techniques. The former is generally both more precise and also more reliable, as photometric redshifts can be more prone to confusion with lower redshift sources that may have unusual spectra. For that reason, a spectroscopic redshift is conventionally regarded as being necessary for an object's distance to be considered definitely known, whereas photometrically determined redshifts identify "candidate" very distant sources. Here, this distinction is indicated by a "p" subscript for photometric redshifts.

== Most distant spectroscopically-confirmed objects ==
Most distant astronomical objects with spectroscopic redshift determinations
Image	Name	Redshift (z)	Years after the Big Bang (millions)	Type	Notes
	MoM-z14	z = 14.44+0.02 −0.02	280	Galaxy	Luminous Lyman-break galaxy, detection of the Lyman break with JWST/NIRSpec.
	JADES-GS-z14-0	z = 14.1796+0.0007 −0.0007	290	Galaxy	The detection of [OIII]88μm line emission with a significance of 6.67σ and at a frequency of 223.524 GHz, corresponding to a redshift of 14.1796 ± 0.0007, using ALMA.
	JADES-GS-z14-1	z = 13.90+0.17 −0.17	300	Galaxy	Lyman-break galaxy, detection of the Lyman break with JWST/NIRSpec.
	PAN-z14-1	z = 13.53+0.05 −0.06	310	Galaxy	Lyman-break galaxy, detection of the Lyman break with JWST/NIRSpec.
	JADES-GS-z13-0	z = 13.20+0.04 −0.07	330	Galaxy	Lyman-break galaxy, detection of the Lyman break with JWST/NIRSpec.
	UNCOVER-z13	z = 13.079+0.014 −0.001	330	Galaxy	Lyman-break galaxy, detection of the Lyman break with JWST/NIRSpec.
	JADES-GS-z13-1	z = 13.0	330	Galaxy	Lyman-alpha emitter, discovered by JWST in 2025.
	JADES-GS-z12-0	z = 12.63+0.24 −0.08	350	Galaxy	Lyman-break galaxy, detection of the Lyman break with JWST/NIRCam and JWST/NIRSpec, and CIII] line emission with JWST/NIRSpec.
	UNCOVER-z12	z = 12.393+0.004 −0.001	350	Galaxy	Lyman-break galaxy, detection of the Lyman break with JWST/NIRSpec.
	GLASS-z12 (GHZ2)	z = 12.3327+0.0035 −0.0035	367	Galaxy	Detection of the rest-frame 88 μm atomic transition from doubly ionized oxygen using ALMA.
	UDFj-39546284	z = 11.58+0.05 −0.05	380	Galaxy	Lyman-break galaxy, detection of the Lyman break with JWST/NIRSpec.
	EGS-z11-R0	z = 11.452 ± 0.021	386	Galaxy	Hot, dust-obscured galaxy, detected with JWST/NIRSpec.
	CEERS J141946.36+525632.8 (Maisie's Galaxy)	z = 11.44+0.09 −0.08	390	Galaxy	Lyman-break galaxy discovered by JWST.
	CEERS2-588	z = 11.04	410	Galaxy	Lyman-break galaxy discovered by JWST.
	GN-z11	z = 10.6034 ± 0.0013	430	Galaxy	Lyman-break galaxy; detection of the Lyman break with HST at 5.5σ and carbon emission lines with Keck/MOSFIRE at 5.3σ. Conclusive redshift by JWST in February 2023
	JADES-GS-z10-0 (UDFj-38116243)	z = 10.38+0.07 −0.06	450	Galaxy	Lyman-break galaxy, detection of the Lyman break with JWST/NIRSpec
	CW-LRD-z10	z = 10.361+0.003 −0.002	450	Little red dot candidate	Candidate little red dot, detection of the lyman break with JWST/NIRSpec.
	JD1	z = 9.793±0.002	480	Galaxy	Lyman-break galaxy, detection of the Lyman break with JWST/NIRSpec
	Gz9p3	z = 9.3127 ± 0.0002	510	Galaxy	A galaxy merger with a redshift estimated from [OII], Ne and H emission lines detected with JWST.
	CAPERS-LRD-z9	z = 9.288 ± 0.003	500	Galaxy / Little red dot	Galaxy / little red dot discovered by JWST.
	MACS1149-JD1	z = 9.1096±0.0006	500	Galaxy	Detection of hydrogen emission line with the VLT, and oxygen line with ALMA
	EGSY8p7 (CEERS_1019)	z = 8.683+0.001 −0.004	570	Galaxy	Lyman-alpha emitter; detection of Lyman-alpha with Keck/MOSFIRE at 7.5σ confidence
	SMACS-4590	z = 8.496		Galaxy	Detection of hydrogen, oxygen, and neon emission lines with JWST/NIRSpec
	A2744 YD4	z = 8.38	600	Galaxy	Lyman-alpha and [O III] emission detected with ALMA at 4.0σ confidence
	MACS0416 Y1	z = 8.3118±0.0003	600	Galaxy	[O III] emission detected with ALMA at 6.3σ confidence
	GRB 090423	z = 8.23+0.06 −0.07	630	Gamma-ray burst	Lyman-alpha break detected
	RXJ2129-11002	z = 8.16±0.01	613	Galaxy	[O III] doublet, Hβ, and [O II] doublet as well as Lyman-alpha break detected with JWST/NIRSpec prism.
	RXJ2129-11022	z = 8.15±0.01		Galaxy	[O III] doublet and Hβ as well as Lyman-alpha break detected with JWST/NIRSpec prism.
	MoM-BH*-1	z = 7.7569+0.0013 −0.0012	660	Little red dot	Candidate to black hole star, detected by JWST.
	EGS-zs8-1	z = 7.7302±0.0006	670	Galaxy	Lyman-break galaxy
	SMACS-0723-6355	z = 7.665		Galaxy	Detection of hydrogen, oxygen, and neon emission lines with JWST/NIRSpec
	z7 GSD 3811	z = 7.6637±0.0011		Galaxy	Lyman-alpha emitter
	SMACS-0723-10612	z = 7.658		Galaxy	Detection of hydrogen, oxygen, and neon emission lines with JWST/NIRSpec
	QSO J0313–1806	z = 7.6423±0.0013	670	Quasar	Lyman-alpha break detected
	ULAS J1342+0928	z = 7.5413±0.0007	690	Quasar	Redshift estimated from [C II] emission
	z8 GND 5296	z = 7.51	700	Galaxy	Lyman-alpha emitter
	A1689-zD1	z = 7.5±0.2	700	Galaxy	Lyman-break galaxy
	GS2_1406	z = 7.452±0.003		Galaxy	Lyman-alpha emitter
	GN-108036	z = 7.213	750	Galaxy	Lyman alpha emitter
	SXDF-NB1006-2	z = 7.2120±0.0003	800	Galaxy	[O III] emission detected
	BDF-3299	z = 7.109±0.002	800	Galaxy	Lyman-break galaxy
	ULAS J1120+0641	z = 7.085±0.003	770	Quasar	Redshift estimated from Si III]+C III] and Mg II emission lines
	A1703 zD6	z = 7.045±0.004		Galaxy	Gravitationally-lensed Lyman-alpha emitter
	BDF-521	z = 7.008±0.002		Galaxy	Lyman-break galaxy
	IOK-1	z = 6.965	780	Galaxy	Lyman-alpha emitter
	GDS 1408 (G2 1408)	z = 6.82±0.1		Galaxy	Lyman-alpha emitter and VLT spectroscopy.

== Candidate most distant objects ==
Since the beginning of the James Webb Space Telescope's (JWST) science operations in June 2022, numerous distant galaxies far beyond what could be seen by the Hubble Space Telescope (z = 11) have been discovered thanks to the JWST's capability of seeing far into the infrared.

Previously in 2012, there were about 50 possible objects z = 8 or farther, and another 100 candidates at z = 7, based on photometric redshift estimates released by the Hubble eXtreme Deep Field (XDF) project from observations made between mid-2002 and December 2012.

Some objects included here have been observed spectroscopically, but had only one emission line tentatively detected, and are therefore still considered candidates by researchers.

Notable candidates for most distant astronomical objects
Name	Redshift (z)	Type	Notes
MIDIS-z25-3 (midisred0049147)	z_{p} = 25.6+1.5 −1.6	Galaxy	A selection based on photometry, photometric redshift probability distributions and visual inspection, based on the JWST/NIRCam data provided by the MIRI Deep Imaging Survey (MIDIS).
F200DB-045	z_{p} = 20.4+0.3 −0.3 or 0.70+0.19 −0.55 or 0.40+0.15 −0.26	Galaxy	Lyman-break galaxy discovered by JWST. Note: The redshift value of the galaxy presented by the procedure in one study may differ from the values presented in other studies using different procedures.
Lizzan (CEERS U-75985)	z_{p} = 17.80+1.48 −1.45	Galaxy	Two photometric catalogs were optimized for detecting faint, red objects. Primarily relying on NIRCam photometry from the latest CEERS data release, mid-infrared/(sub)millimeter data was used when available.
Budiara (CEERS U-31863)	z_{p} = 17.76+1.6 −1.5	Galaxy	Two photometric catalogs were optimized for detecting faint, red objects. Primarily relying on NIRCam photometry from the latest CEERS data release, mid-infrared/(sub)millimeter data was used when available.
Viciadgo (CEERS U-34120)	z_{p} = 17.56+1.4 −1.3	Galaxy	Two photometric catalogs were optimized for detecting faint, red objects. Primarily relying on NIRCam photometry from the latest CEERS data release, mid-infrared/(sub)millimeter data was used when available.
Naspe (CEERS U-80918)	z_{p} = 17.55+1.47 −1.30	Galaxy	Two photometric catalogs were optimized for detecting faint, red objects. Primarily relying on NIRCam photometry from the latest CEERS data release, mid-infrared/(sub)millimeter data was used when available.
Arcerio (CEERS A-22691)	z_{p} = 17.32+2.05 −2.98	Galaxy	Two photometric catalogs were optimized for detecting faint, red objects. Primarily relying on NIRCam photometry from the latest CEERS data release, mid-infrared/(sub)millimeter data was used when available.
GLIMPSE 70467	z_{p} = 16.4+1.8 −1.8	Galaxy	Lyman-break selection and photometry
F200DB-175	z_{p} = 16.2+0.3 −0.0	Galaxy	Lyman-break galaxy discovered by JWST
S5-z17-1	z = 16.0089±0.0004 or 4.6108±0.0001	Galaxy	Lyman-break galaxy discovered by JWST; tentative (5.1σ) ALMA detection of a single emission line possibly attributed to either [C II] (z = 4.6108±0.0001) or [O III] (z = 16.0089±0.0004).
F150DB-041	z_{p} = 16.0+0.2 −0.2 or 3.70+0.02 −0.59	Galaxy	Lyman-break galaxy discovered by JWST
SMACS-z16a	z_{p} = 15.92+0.17 −0.15 or 2.96+0.73 −0.21	Galaxy	Lyman-break galaxy discovered by JWST
F200DB-015	z_{p} = 15.8+3.4 −0.1	Galaxy	Lyman-break galaxy discovered by JWST
F200DB-181	z_{p} = 15.8+0.5 −0.3	Galaxy	Lyman-break galaxy discovered by JWST
F200DB-159	z_{p} = 15.8+4.0 −15.2	Galaxy	Lyman-break galaxy discovered by JWST
GLIMPSE 72839	z_{p} = 15.8+0.8 −0.8	Galaxy	Lyman-break selection and photometry
F200DB-086	z_{p} = 15.4+0.6 −14.6 or 3.53+10.28 −1.84	Galaxy	Lyman-break galaxy discovered by JWST
SMACS-z16b	z_{p} = 15.32+0.16 −0.13 or 15.39+0.18 −0.26	Galaxy	Lyman-break galaxy discovered by JWST
F150DB-048	z_{p} = 15.0+0.2 −0.8	Galaxy	Lyman-break galaxy discovered by JWST
F150DB-007	z_{p} = 14.6+0.4 −0.4	Galaxy	Lyman-break galaxy discovered by JWST

== List of most distant objects by type ==
Most distant object by type
Type	Object	Redshift (distance)	Notes
Any astronomical object, no matter what type	MoM-z14	z = 14.4	This is a galaxy discovered by JWST-based "Mirage or Miracle" (MoM) survey.
Galaxy cluster	CL J1001+0220	z ≅ 2.506	As of 2016 See also: List of galaxy clusters
Galaxy supercluster	Hyperion proto-supercluster	z = 2.45	This supercluster at the time of its discovery in 2018 was the earliest and largest proto-supercluster found to date. See also: List of superclusters
Galaxy protocluster	A2744z7p9OD	z = 7.88	This protocluster at the time of its discovery in 2023 was the most distant protocluster found and spectroscopically confirmed to date. See also: List of galaxy groups and clusters
Galaxy or protogalaxy	MoM-z14	z = 14.4	
Quasar	UHZ1	z ≅ 10.0	See also: List of quasars
Black hole	GN-z11	z = 10.6034±0.0013	
Little red dot	CAPERS-LRD-z9	z = 9.288	The candidate CW-LRD-z10 might be more distant at z = 10.361.
Star or protostar or post-stellar corpse (detected by an event)	Progenitor of GRB 090423	z = 8.26+0.07 −0.08	Note, GRB 090429B has a photometric redshift z_{p}≅9.4, and so is most likely more distant than GRB 090423, but is lacking spectroscopic confirmation. Estimated an approximate distance of 13 billion lightyears from Earth. See also: List of gamma-ray bursts
Star or protostar or post-stellar corpse (detected as a star)	WHL0137-LS (Earendel)	z = 6.2 ± 0.1 (12.9 Gly)	Most distant individual star detected when discovered March 2022. Previous records include SDSS J1229+1122 and MACS J1149 Lensed Star 1. See also: List of most distant stars
Star cluster	The Sparkler	z = 1.378 (13.9 Gly)	Galaxy with globular clusters gravitationally lensed in SMACS J0723.3-7327
System of star clusters	The Sparkler	z = 1.378 (13.9 Gly)	Galaxy with globular clusters gravitationally lensed in SMACS J0723.3-7327
X-ray jet	PJ352–15 quasar jet	z = 5.831 (12.7 Gly)	The previous recordholder was at 12.4 Gly.
Microquasar	XMMU J004243.6+412519	(2.5 Mly)	First extragalactic microquasar discovered
Nebula-like object	Himiko	z = 6.595	Possibly one of the largest objects in the early universe.
Magnetic field	9io9	z = 2.554 (11.1 Gly)	Observations from ALMA has shown that the lensed galaxy 9io9 contains a magnetic field.
Planet	SWEEPS-11 / SWEEPS-04	(27,710 ly)	An analysis of the lightcurve of the microlensing event PA-99-N2 suggests the presence of a planet orbiting a star in the much farther Andromeda Galaxy.; A controversial microlensing event of lobe A of the double gravitationally lensed Q0957+561 suggests that there is a planet in the lensing galaxy lying at redshift 0.355 (3.7 Gly).
Brown dwarf	JWSTJ033240.07−274907.8	21,500 ± 1,000 ly	Several Tidal disruption events have been found to likely involve brown dwarfs.

Most distant event by type
Type	Event	Redshift	Notes
Gamma-ray burst	GRB 090423	z = 8.26+0.07 −0.08	Note, GRB 090429B has a photometric redshift z_{p} ≅ 9.4, and so is most likely more distant than GRB 090423, but is lacking spectroscopic confirmation. See also: List of gamma-ray bursts
Supernova (any type)	SN Eos	z = 5.133±0.001	A strongly lensed, multiply imaged Type II supernova
Core collapse supernova	SN 1000+0216	z = 3.8993	See also: List of most distant supernovae
Type Ia supernova	SN UDS10Wil	z = 1.914	See also: List of supernovae

== Timeline of most distant astronomical object recordholders ==
Objects in this list were found to be the most distant object at the time of determination of their distance. This is frequently not the same as the date of their discovery.

Distances to astronomical objects may be determined through parallax measurements, use of standard references such as cepheid variables or Type Ia supernovas, or redshift measurement. Spectroscopic redshift measurement is preferred, while photometric redshift measurement is also used to identify candidate high redshift sources. The symbol z represents redshift.

Most distant object titleholders (not including candidates based on photometric redshifts)
Object	Type	Date	Distance (z = redshift)	Notes
MoM-z14	Galaxy	2025–present	z = 14.44	
JADES-GS-z14-0	Galaxy	2024–2025	z = 14.32	
JADES-GS-z13-0	Galaxy	2022–2024	z = 13.20	
GN-z11	Galaxy	2016–2022	z = 10.6	
EGSY8p7	Galaxy	2015−2016	z = 8.68	
Progenitor of GRB 090423 / remnant of GRB 090423	Gamma-ray burst progenitor / gamma-ray burst remnant	2009–2015	z = 8.2	
IOK-1	Galaxy	2006−2009	z = 6.96	
SDF J132522.3+273520	Galaxy	2005−2006	z = 6.597	
SDF J132418.3+271455	Galaxy	2003−2005	z = 6.578	
HCM-6A	Galaxy	2002−2003	z = 6.56	The galaxy is lensed by galaxy cluster Abell 370. This was the first non-quasar galaxy found to exceed redshift 6. It exceeded the redshift of quasar SDSSp J103027.10+052455.0 of z = 6.28
SDSS J1030+0524 (SDSSp J103027.10+052455.0)	Quasar	2001−2002	z = 6.28	
SDSS 1044–0125 (SDSSp J104433.04–012502.2)	Quasar	2000−2001	z = 5.82	
SSA22-HCM1	Galaxy	1999–2000	z ≥ 5.74	
HDF 4-473.0	Galaxy	1998–1999	z = 5.60	
RD1 (0140+326 RD1)	Galaxy	1998	z = 5.34	
CL 1358+62 G1 & CL 1358+62 G2	Galaxies	1997−1998	z = 4.92	These were the most remote objects discovered at the time. The pair of galaxies were found lensed by galaxy cluster CL1358+62 (z = 0.33). This was the first time since 1964 that something other than a quasar held the record for being the most distant object in the universe.
PC 1247–3406	Quasar	1991−1997	z = 4.897	
PC 1158+4635	Quasar	1989−1991	z = 4.73	
Q0051–279	Quasar	1987−1989	z = 4.43	
Q0000–26 (QSO B0000–26)	Quasar	1987	z = 4.11	
PC 0910+5625 (QSO B0910+5625)	Quasar	1987	z = 4.04	This was the second quasar discovered with a redshift over 4.
Q0046–293 (QSO J0048–2903)	Quasar	1987	z = 4.01	
Q1208+1011 (QSO B1208+1011)	Quasar	1986−1987	z = 3.80	This is a gravitationally-lensed double-image quasar, and at the time of discovery to 1991, had the least angular separation between images, 0.45″.
PKS 2000-330 (QSO J2003–3251, Q2000–330)	Quasar	1982−1986	z = 3.78	
OQ172 (QSO B1442+101)	Quasar	1974−1982	z = 3.53	
OH471 (QSO B0642+449)	Quasar	1973−1974	z = 3.408	Nickname was "the blaze marking the edge of the universe".
4C 05.34	Quasar	1970−1973	z = 2.877	Its redshift was so much greater than the previous record that it was believed to be erroneous, or spurious.
5C 02.56 (7C 105517.75+495540.95)	Quasar	1968−1970	z = 2.399	
4C 25.05 (4C 25.5)	Quasar	1968	z = 2.358	
PKS 0237–23 (QSO B0237–2321)	Quasar	1967−1968	z = 2.225	
4C 12.39 (Q1116+12, PKS 1116+12)	Quasar	1966−1967	z = 2.1291	
4C 01.02 (Q0106+01, PKS 0106+1)	Quasar	1965−1966	z = 2.0990	
3C 9	Quasar	1965	z = 2.018	
3C 147	Quasar	1964−1965	z = 0.545	
3C 295	Radio galaxy	1960 − 1964	z = 0.461	
LEDA 25177 (MCG+01-23-008)	Brightest cluster galaxy	1951−1960	z = 0.2 (V = 61000 km/s)	This galaxy lies in the Hydra Supercluster. It is located at B1950.0 08^{h} 55^{m} 4^{s} +03° 21′ and is the BCG of the fainter Hydra Cluster Cl 0855+0321 (ACO 732).
LEDA 51975 (MCG+05-34-069)	Brightest cluster galaxy	1936–	z = 0.13 (V = 39000 km/s)	The brightest cluster galaxy of the Bootes Cluster (ACO 1930), an elliptical galaxy at B1950.0 14^{h} 30^{m} 6^{s} +31° 46′ apparent magnitude 17.8, was found by Milton L. Humason in 1936 to have a 40,000 km/s recessional redshift velocity.
LEDA 20221 (MCG+06-16-021)	Brightest cluster galaxy	1932–	z = 0.075 (V = 23000 km/s)	This is the BCG of the Gemini Cluster (ACO 568) and was located at B1950.0 07^{h} 05^{m} 0^{s} +35° 04′
BCG of WMH Christie's Leo Cluster	Brightest cluster galaxy	1931−1932	z = (V = 19700 km/s)	
BCG of Baede's Ursa Major Cluster	Brightest cluster galaxy	1930−1931	z = (V = 11700 km/s)	
NGC 4860	Galaxy	1929−1930	z = 0.026 (V = 7800 km/s)	
NGC 7619	Galaxy	1929	z = 0.012 (V = 3779 km/s)	Using redshift measurements, NGC 7619 was the highest at the time of measurement. At the time of announcement, it was not yet accepted as a general guide to distance, however, later in the year, Edwin Hubble described redshift in relation to distance, which became accepted widely as an inferred distance.
NGC 584 (Dreyer nebula 584)	Galaxy	1921−1929	z = 0.006 (V = 1800 km/s)	At the time, nebula had yet to be accepted as independent galaxies. However, in 1923, galaxies were generally recognized as external to the Milky Way.
M104 (NGC 4594)	Galaxy	1913−1921	z = 0.004 (V = 1180 km/s)	This was the second galaxy whose redshift was determined; the first being Andromeda – which is approaching the Milky Way and thus cannot have its redshift used to infer distance. Both were measured by Vesto Melvin Slipher. At this time, nebula had yet to be accepted as independent galaxies. NGC 4594 was measured originally as 1000 km/s, then refined to 1100, and then to 1180 in 1916.
Arcturus (Alpha Bootis)	Star	1891−1910	160 ly (18 mas) (this is inaccurate, true = 37 ly)	This number is wrong; originally announced in 1891, the figure was corrected in 1910 to 40 ly (60 mas). From 1891 to 1910, it had been thought this was the star with the smallest known parallax, hence the most distant star whose distance was known. Prior to 1891, Arcturus had previously been recorded of having a parallax of 127 mas.
Capella (Alpha Aurigae)	Star	1849–1891	72 ly (46 mas)	
Polaris (Alpha Ursae Minoris)	Star	1847–1849	50 ly (80 mas) (this is inaccurate, true = ~440 ly)	
Vega (Alpha Lyrae)	Star (part of a double star pair)	1839–1847	7.77 pc (125 mas)	
61 Cygni	Binary star	1838−1839	3.48 pc (313.6 mas)	This was the first star other than the Sun to have its distance measured.
Uranus	Planet of the Solar System	1781−1838	18 AU	This was the last planet discovered before the first successful measurement of stellar parallax. It had been determined that the stars were much farther away than the planets.
Saturn	Planet of the Solar System	1619−1781	10 AU	From Kepler's Third Law, it was finally determined that Saturn is indeed the outermost of the classical planets, and its distance derived. It had only previously been conjectured to be the outermost, due to it having the longest orbital period, and slowest orbital motion. It had been determined that the stars were much farther away than the planets.
Mars	Planet of the Solar System	1609−1619	2.6 AU when Mars is diametrically opposed to Earth	Kepler correctly characterized Mars and Earth's orbits in the publication Astronomia nova. It had been conjectured that the fixed stars were much farther away than the planets.
Sun	Star	3rd century BC − 1609	380 Earth radii (this is inaccurate, true = 16000 Earth radii)	Aristarchus of Samos made a measurement of the distance of the Sun from Earth in relation to the distance of the Moon from Earth. The distance to the Moon was described in Earth radii (20, also inaccurate). The diameter of Earth had been calculated previously. At the time, it was assumed that some of the planets were further away, but their distances could not be measured. The order of the planets was conjecture until Kepler determined the distances from the Sun of the five known planets that were not Earth. It had been conjectured that the fixed stars were much farther away than the planets.
Moon	Moon of a planet	3rd century BC	20 Earth radii (this is inaccurate, true = 64 Earth radii)	Aristarchus of Samos made a measurement of the distance between Earth and the Moon. The diameter of Earth had been calculated previously.
z represents redshift, a measure of recessional velocity and inferred distance due to cosmological expansion; mas represents parallax, a measure of angle and distance that can be determined through trigonometry

== See also ==
- Age of the universe
- List of largest cosmic structures
- List of exoplanet extremes
- Lists of astronomical objects
- List of most distant stars
- Timeline of knowledge about galaxies, clusters of galaxies, and large-scale structure
