= PAN-z14-1 =

Lyman-break galaxy in the constellation Aquarius

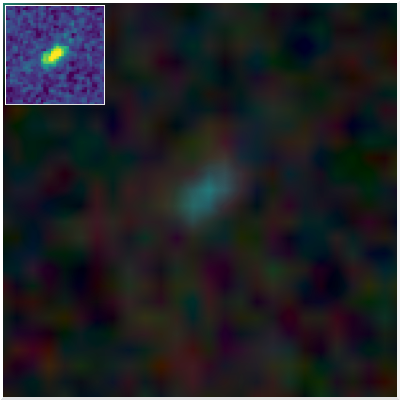
- Image of PAN-z14-1, obtained with the JWST/NIRCam telescope as part of the PANORAMIC Survey project.

Observation data (J2000 epoch)
- Constellation: Aquarius
- Right ascension: 22^{h} 17^{m} 00.11^{s} (334.25035598 deg)
- Declination: +00° 22′ 44.7″ (0.3792145611 deg)
- Redshift: 13.53+0.05 −0.06
- Distance: 13.482 billion light-years (light travel distance); 33.428 billion light-years (proper distance)
- Apparent magnitude (V): 20.6±0.2

Characteristics
- Type: Lyman-break galaxy
- Half-light radius (physical): 760±33 ly (233±10 pc)
- Notable features: It is the fourth most distant confirmed discovered galaxy.

PAN-z14-1 is a high-redshift Lyman-break galaxy in the constellation Aquarius, discovered in late 2023 by the James Webb Space Telescope as part of a pure parallel observation program and spectroscopically confirmed in mid-January 2026. Its redshift is z = 13.53, making it the fourth most distant galaxy known to date. According to the modern Lambda-CDM model, this redshift corresponds to a time approximately 310 million years after the Big Bang.

== Discovery ==
PAN-z14-1 was first observed in November 2023 as part of the PANORAMIC program, using the NIRCam digital camera on the James Webb Space Telescope.

In January 2026, an international team of researchers published the results of a spectroscopic analysis conducted using the NIRSpec instrument. The spectrum confirmed the presence of a sharp Lyman break, caused by the absorption of short-wavelength radiation by neutral hydrogen in the intergalactic medium. Based on the measurements, the precise redshift value was determined to be 13.53.

== Physical Characteristics ==
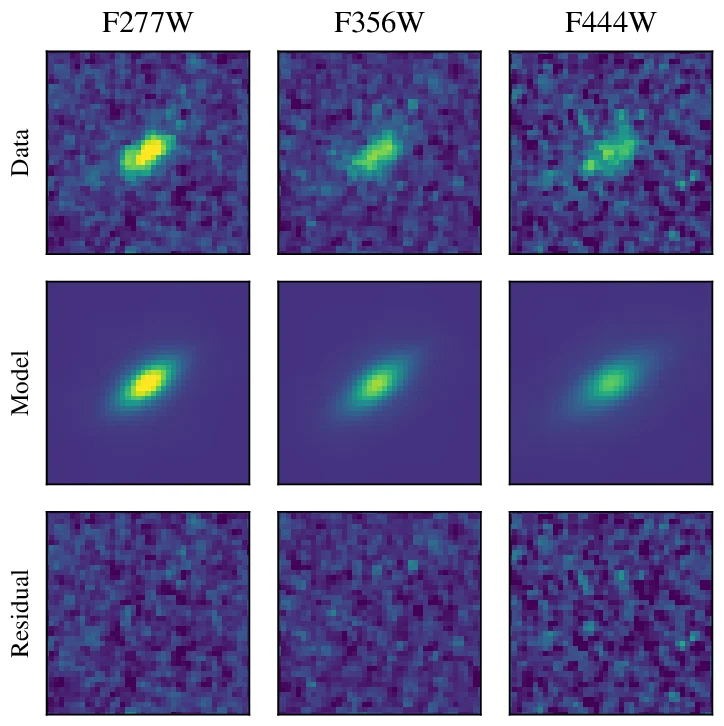
The morphological fits to PAN-z14-1. The top row shows postage stamps of PAN-z14-1 (1.2 × 1.2 arcsec). The middle and bottom rows show the best-fitting galfit model and corresponding residuals, respectively

PAN-z14-1 is classified as an anomalously bright galaxy in the ultraviolet, with an effective radius of just 233±10 parsecs, or 760±33 light-years. The galaxy's absolute stellar magnitude is −20.6±0.2, making it one of the brightest galaxies with a redshift of z > 10. The slope of the continuum in the galaxy's ultraviolet emission lines is β = −2.26±0.08, meaning it is negative or blue. This indicates the presence of a moderately metal-enriched stellar population and possible traces of primordial interstellar dust, which is uncharacteristic of hypothetical metal-free Population III stars. The spectrum exhibits a strong Lyman-alpha break, typical of objects at high redshifts, as well as signs of ionized hydrogen.

The stellar mass of this galaxy is estimated at log(M⋆/M_{⊙}) = 8.23+1.14
−0.21, which is equivalent to 169,824,000 solar masses.

NIRCam data reveal that the galaxy is not a homogeneous sphere. Its structure shows distinct knots or clumps. This could be interpreted either as the result of a merger of two smaller protogalaxies or as the fragmentation of dense gas clouds within a single dark matter halo.

The star formation rate of PAN-z14-1 is estimated at 4.8+13.6
−4.8 solar masses per year. This star formation intensity, combined with its relatively small size, results in an extremely high surface brightness.

According to the current ΛCDM parameters, this redshift of 13.53 corresponds to a light-travel time (lookback time) of 13.482 billion years. However, due to the expansion of the Universe, its comoving distance is 33.428 Gly.

In terms of physical properties, PAN-z14-1 is strikingly similar to the previously confirmed galaxy JADES-GS-z14-0. The absence of strong emission lines and its large physical size are consistent with a forming picture of two potentially distinct galaxy populations at z > 10, differing in their star formation rate surface density. In this scenario, PAN-z14-1 is the second example of a "normal," extended, bright, star-forming galaxy at z ≈ 14, and it notably differs from another class of extremely compact galaxies with strong emission lines recently discovered at extreme redshifts by JWST.

== See also ==
- List of the most distant astronomical objects
- MoM-z14 - the most distant known galaxy.
- JADES-GS-z14-0 - similar in parameters to PAN-z14-1.

== Image gallery ==
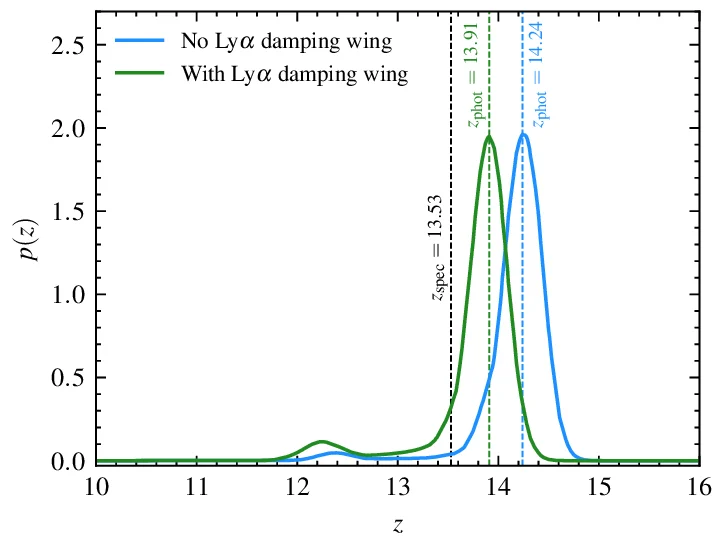
The p(z) distribution from SED fitting the NIRCam photometry of PAN-z14-1 using the code from R. J. McLure et al. (2011), both with (green) and without (blue) accounting for the Lyman-α damping wing.

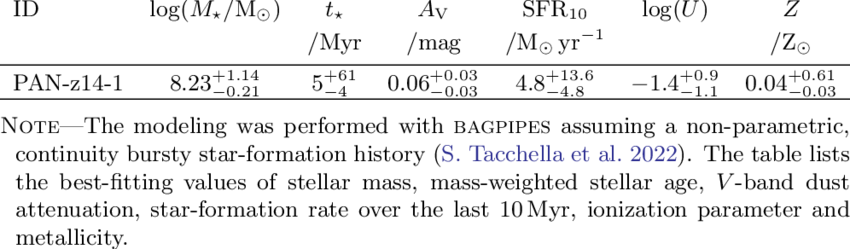
Properties derived from spectro-photometric modeling of PAN-z14-1.
