= Maisie's Galaxy =

Extremely distant galaxy in constellation Boötes

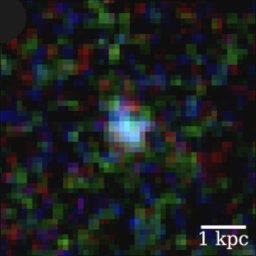
- A picture of Maisie's galaxy made by combining images from three different filters.

Observation data (J2000 epoch)
- Constellation: Boötes
- Right ascension: 14^{h} 19^{m} 46.36^{s}
- Declination: +52° 56′ 32.8″
- Redshift: 11.4

Characteristics
- Type: Lyman-break galaxy

Other designations
- CEERS J141946.36+525632.8, [HOO2023] CR2-z12-1

Maisie's Galaxy (also known as CEERS J141946.36+525632.8 or CR2-z12-1) is a distant galaxy located in constellation Boötes with a redshift of z=11.4 dating from approximately 390 million years after the Big Bang.

== Background ==
Discovered in 2022 using the James Webb Space Telescope (JWST) in the CEERS field, Maisie's Galaxy has high star formation rates. It was named after the nine-year-old daughter of the person who discovered it, Steve Finkelstein, an astronomer at the University of Texas at Austin.

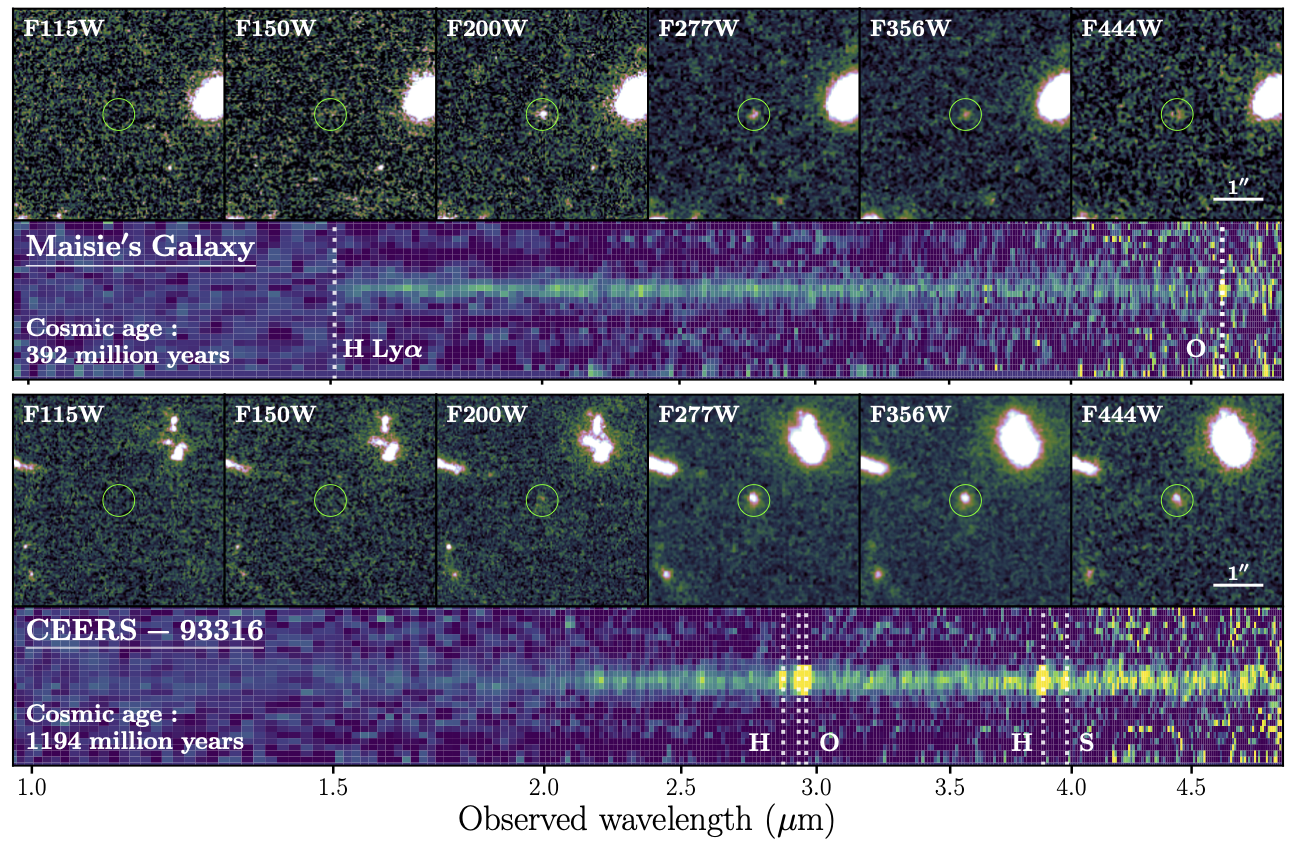
Maisie’s Galaxy and CEERS-93316 shown at six infrared wavelengths, with small circles highlighting each object.

In February 2023, the CEERS teams followed up their high-redshift candidates with observatory's NIRSpec (Near-Infrared Spectrograph) instrument to measure precise, spectroscopic redshifts. One candidate (Maisie's Galaxy) has been confirmed to be at redshift 11.4 (when the universe was 390 million years old), while the second candidate was discovered to actually be at a lower redshift of 4.9 (when the universe was 1.2 billion years old).

== See also ==
- List of the most distant astronomical objects
