= EGS-z11-R0 =

Massive galaxy in the constellation Boötes

- RGB NIRCam image of EGS-z11-R0

Observation data (J2000 epoch)
- Constellation: Boötes
- Right ascension: 14^{h} 19^{m} 26.81^{s}
- Declination: +52° 51′ 42.66″
- Redshift: 11.452±0.021
- Distance: 13.401 billion light-years (light travel distance); 32.342 billion light-years (proper distance)
- Apparent magnitude (V): 22.86±4.92 (F200W)

Characteristics
- Type: Massive dust-rich starburst galaxy
- Mass: 1.6×10^{9} – 4×10^{9} M_{☉}
- Notable features: The most distant red galaxy ever detected and confirmed

EGS-z11-R0 is a high-redshift galaxy located in the constellation Boötes. It was discovered in March 2026 using the James Webb Space Telescope. The object stands out among other galaxies from that period due to an anomalously high concentration of cosmic dust and a mature chemical composition, earning it the unofficial nickname "red monster".

== Discovery ==
The galaxy was identified between 2024 and 2026 by an international team of astronomers led by Giulia Rodighiero from the University of Padua.

The object was discovered in the Extended Groth Strip region of the sky during the analysis of data from the "Cosmic Evolution Early Release Science Survey" program. Initial identification was made from images captured by the NIRCam camera, and final confirmation of its redshift was obtained using the NIRSpec spectrograph. The research findings were detailed in a paper published on March 18, 2026, on the arXiv preprint server.

== Physical characteristics ==
Observed 2D spectrum (top panel) and extracted 1D spectrum (bottom panel) of EGS-z11-R0

The object is classified as a massive dust-rich starburst galaxy. Its redshift is 11.452, meaning we are observing it as it was 390 million years after the Big Bang. According to current ΛCDM parameters, this corresponds to a light-travel distance of 13.401 billion years. However, due to the expansion of the Universe, its comoving distance is 32.342 Gly. The stellar mass of this galaxy is estimated to be in the range of log(M⋆/M_{⊙}) = 9.1 - 9.6, which is equivalent to a range of 1.6 to 4 billion solar masses. Analysis of the spectral energy distribution indicates the presence of both young massive stars and a forming layer of older stars, suggesting a continuous and intense star formation process. The star formation rate (SFR) is approximately 10–40 solar masses per year. According to the study, EGS-z11-R0 has an UV slope of about -1.0, what is in contrast to the majority of galaxies with redshifts higher than 10, which typically exhibit very blue continua consistent with dust-poor stellar populations.

The galaxy is also characterized by a high extinction coefficient, equal to Av ≈ 1.0-1.5 magnitudes. Dense interstellar dust effectively absorbs ultraviolet radiation and re-emits it, making the galaxy optically red. Spectroscopy has revealed the presence of heavy elements such as carbon and oxygen. This demonstrates that several cycles of supernova explosions have already occurred in the system, enriching the environment with metals necessary for dust grain formation.

Based on the analysis of ionization spectral lines and the total luminosity of the system, the estimated mass of the central object is 10⁵ solar masses. This value intriguingly aligns with the expected mass range for massive early black hole "seeds," such as direct collapse black holes or primordial black holes.

The object itself is an extremely compact system. The high density of stars and gas within a small volume indicates that EGS-z11-R0 is a proto-nucleus of a massive elliptical galaxy. Due to its high dust content, it is practically invisible in the ultraviolet range.

Future JWST spectroscopy and deeper mid-infrared, submillimeter and radio observations will be crucial to establish the prevalence of these early dust-rich galaxies and to clarify their role in the earliest phases of galaxy and black-hole growth.

== See also ==
- Galaxy formation and evolution
- James Webb Space Telescope
- GN-z11 - one of the most distant known galaxies.
