= SN Eos =

Strongly lensed Type II-P supernova in the constellation Sagittarius

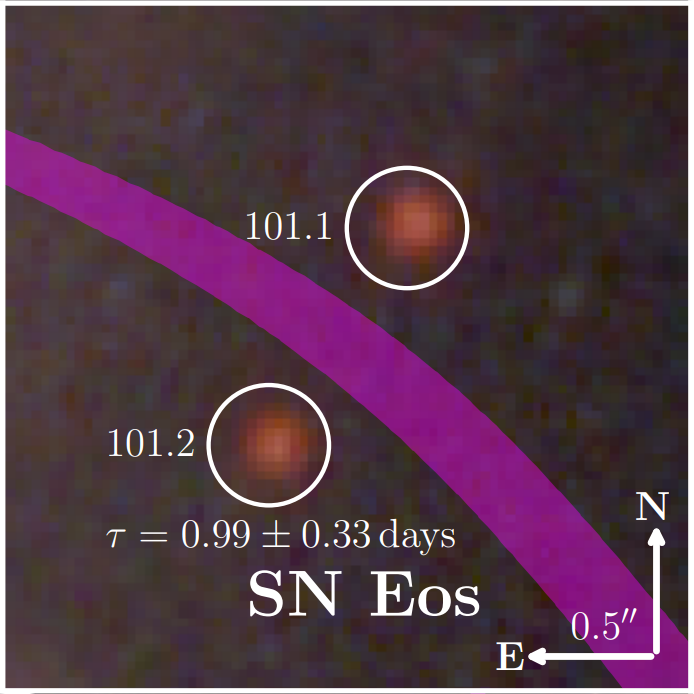
- James Webb Space Telescope's image of Type II-P Supernova SN Eos
- Event type: Supernova
- Type II-P
- Date: 12.661 billion years ago (detected September 1, 2025)
- Constellation: Sagittarius
- Right ascension: 19^{h} 31^{m} 49^{s}
- Declination: −26° 34′ 32″
- Epoch: J2000
- Distance: 26.138 billion light-years
- Redshift: 5.133±0.001
- Host: Lyman-alpha emitting galaxy
- Progenitor: Initially a 10–15 M_{☉} star
- Notable features: Farthest confirmed supernova discovered. Has extremely low metallicity
- Peak apparent magnitude: 26.2±0.1 AB (F200W)
- Related media on Commons

SN Eos is a strongly lensed Type II-P supernova that, as of January 2026, is the most distant spectroscopically confirmed supernova ever discovered. It was named for Eos, the goddess of dawn in Greek mythology, because it occurred during the "dawn" of the Universe.

Its redshift is 5.133, indicating that it exploded when the Universe was only 1.1 billion years old. The object was discovered on September 1, 2025, by an international team of astronomers using the James Webb Space Telescope, thanks to gravitational lensing of the galaxy cluster MACS J1931.8-2635, which distorted and amplified the supernova's light by approximately 30 times. The NIRSpec instrument detected characteristic absorption lines, and archival data from the Hubble Space Telescope revealed far-ultraviolet emission at 1300 Å, which may indicate a shock breakout or interaction with circumstellar material in the early days after the explosion.

The light from the explosion traveled to Earth for 12.661 billion years, and its proper distance, accounting for the expansion of the Universe, is 26.138 billion light-years. The estimated mass of the progenitor star was between 10 and 15 solar masses.

Also interesting is the low metallicity of the progenitor star, as the chemical composition of its parent environment is characterized by a low content of elements heavier than helium, less than 10% of the solar value. This implies that the progenitor star formed in a chemically primitive, early-universe environment.

The supernova SN Eos, identified as a gravitationally lensed Type II-P object with low metallicity, is presented in the images as multiple images. This discovery aligns with the key objectives of the James Webb Space Telescope in studying the life cycles of the first stars, nucleosynthesis processes, and the formation mechanisms of early galaxies.

== See also ==
- List of most distant supernovae
- List of the most distant astronomical objects

== Image gallery ==
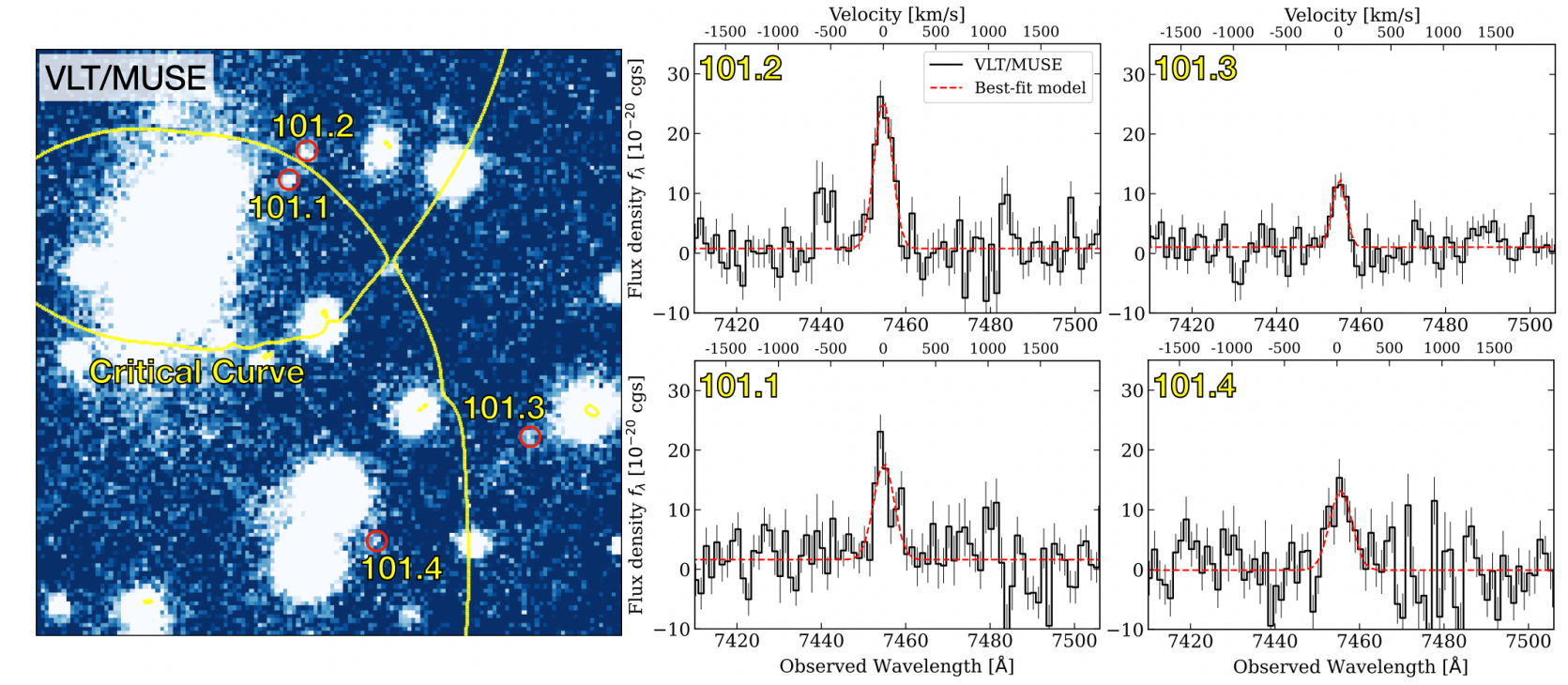
VLT/MUSE observations of the SN Eos host galaxy.

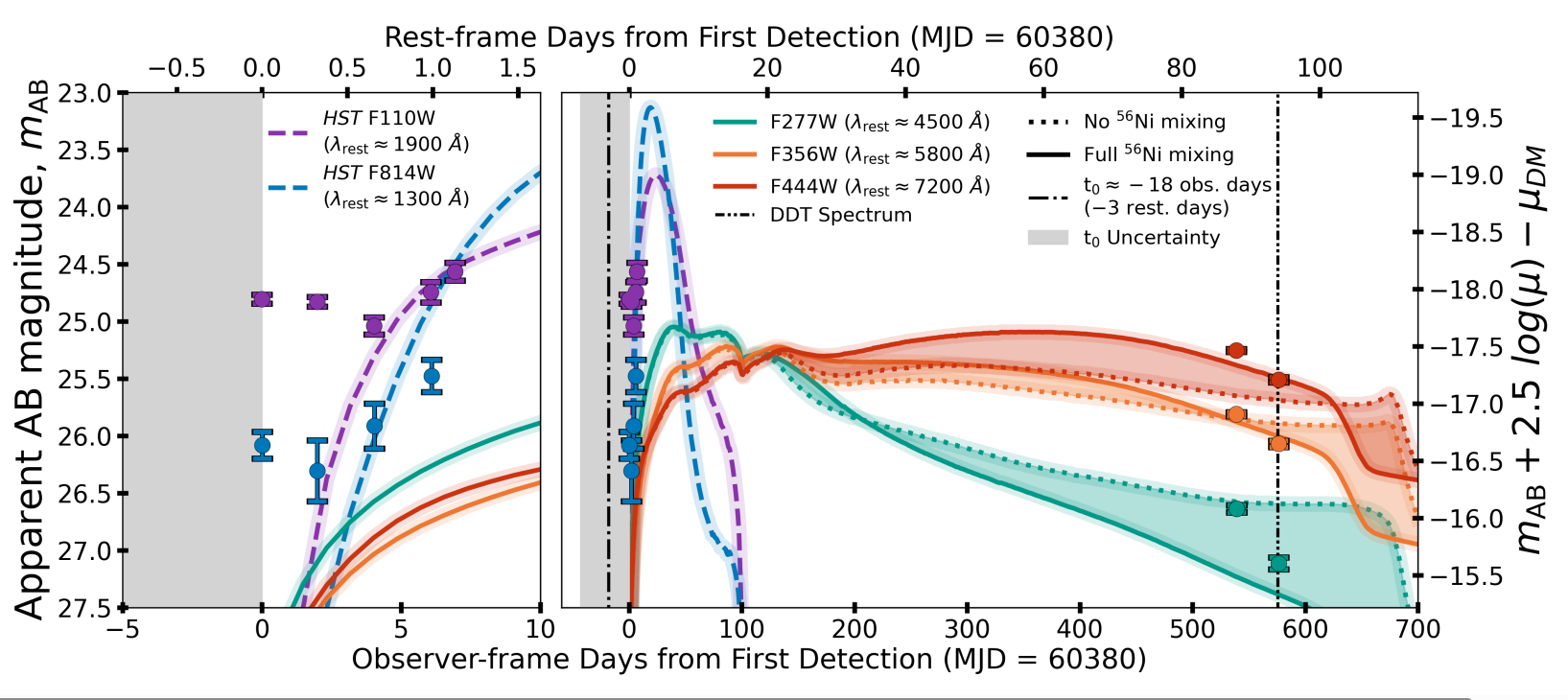
Light curve of SN Eos, highlighting early FUV detections, with comparison against a theoretical model.

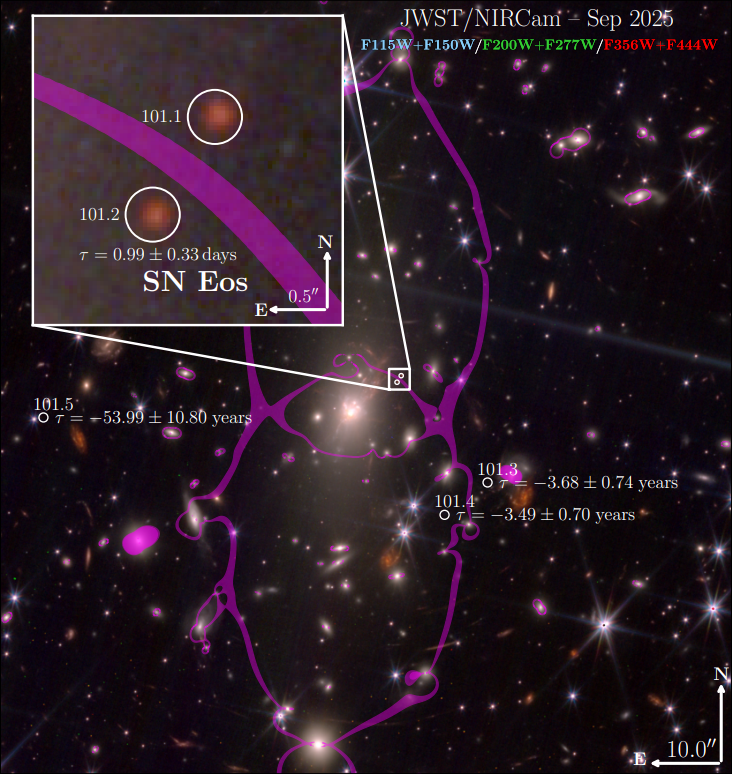
James Webb Space Telescope discovery image of the MACS 1931.8-2635 galaxy cluster containing SN Eos.
