= JADES-GS-z13-1 =

High-redshift galaxy in the constellation Fornax

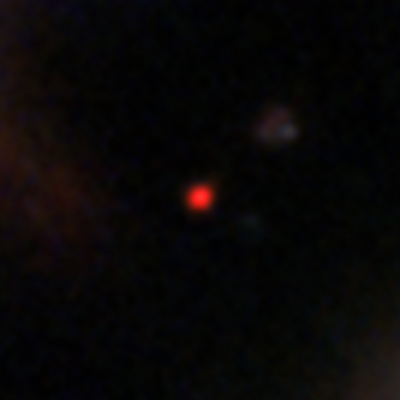
- Image of JADES-GS-z13-1 taken with the James Webb Space Telescope

Observation data
- Constellation: Fornax
- Right ascension: 03^{h} 32^{m} 15.57^{s}
- Declination: −27° 53′ 23.29″
- Redshift: 13.01+0.02 −0.01
- Distance: 13.47 billion light-years (light travel distance); 33.31 billion light-years (present proper distance)

Characteristics
- Type: Lyman-alpha emitter

Other designations
- JADES-GS-z13-1-LA, JADES-GS+53.06475-27.89024

JADES-GS-z13-1 or JADES-GS-z13-1-LA (also known as JADES-GS+53.06475-27.89024) is a high-redshift Lyman-Break galaxy in the constellation Fornax that was observed with the NIRSpec instrument of the James Webb Space Telescope (JWST) between 10 and 12 January 2024 as part of the JWST Advanced Deep Extragalactic Survey (JADES) and JADES Origins Field (JOF) programmes.

It has a redshift of 13.01+0.02
−0.01, making it one of the most distant galaxies discovered. According to current theory, this redshift corresponds to a time about 13.47 billion years ago, approximately 330 million years after the Big Bang, or about 2,4% of its current age.

== JADES-GS-z13-1-LA and the onset of reionization ==
Cosmic reionization began when ultraviolet (UV) radiation produced in the first galaxies began illuminating the cold, neutral gas that filled the primordial Universe.

The spectroscopy of JADES-GS-z13-1-LA reveals a singular, bright emission line unambiguously identified as Lyman-α, as well as a smooth turnover.

Smooth turnover of the UV continua has been interpreted as damping-wing absorption of Lyman-α (Ly-α), the principal hydrogen transition.

It is observed in JADES-GS-z13-1-LA an equivalent width of EW Ly-α > 40 Å (rest frame), previously only seen at z < 9 where the intervening intergalactic medium becomes increasingly ionized. Together with an extremely blue UV continuum, the unexpected Ly-α emission indicates that the galaxy is a prolific producer and leaker of ionizing photons. This suggests that massive, hot stars or an active galactic nucleus have created an early reionized region to prevent complete extinction of Ly-α.

Whether the Ly-α emission of JADES-GS-z13-1-LA originates in stars or a supermassive black hole, it reveals the rather extreme character of one of the earliest galaxies known, despite having been found in a modest survey area examining a comoving volume of 50,000 Mpc^{3} between z = 11 and z = 15.

At only 330 Myr after the Big Bang, the probable presence of a reionized region around this relatively UV-faint source readily constrains the timeline of cosmic reionization, favouring an early and gradual process driven (initially) by low-mass galaxies.
