= BZK =

BZK or variant, may refer to:

- Benzalkonium, a quaternary ammonium cation, frequently used as a biocidal cleanser

== Groups and organizations ==
- Billy Ze Kick, a French rock band
- Ministry of the Interior and Kingdom Relations of the Netherlands (BZK; Dutch: Ministerie van Binnenlandse Zaken en Koninkrijksrelaties), a government ministry
- BZK (cycling team), former name of the women's pro team Glas–Smurfit Kappa

== Places ==
- Bryansk International Airport (IATA airport code: BZK; ICAO airport code: UUBP), Bryansk Oblast, Russia
- Bhaini Khurd station (rail code: BZK), Karnal, Haryana, India; a rail station, see List of railway stations in Haryana

== Other uses ==
- Miskito Coast Creole (ISO 639 language code: bzk)
- BzK galaxy, a photometric galaxy classification
- BzK, a Czech artillery designation, see List of artillery by type
- BZK, a PRC military designation for UAVs, see List of unmanned aerial vehicles of China
