= MoM-z14 =

Lyman-break galaxy in the constellation Sextans

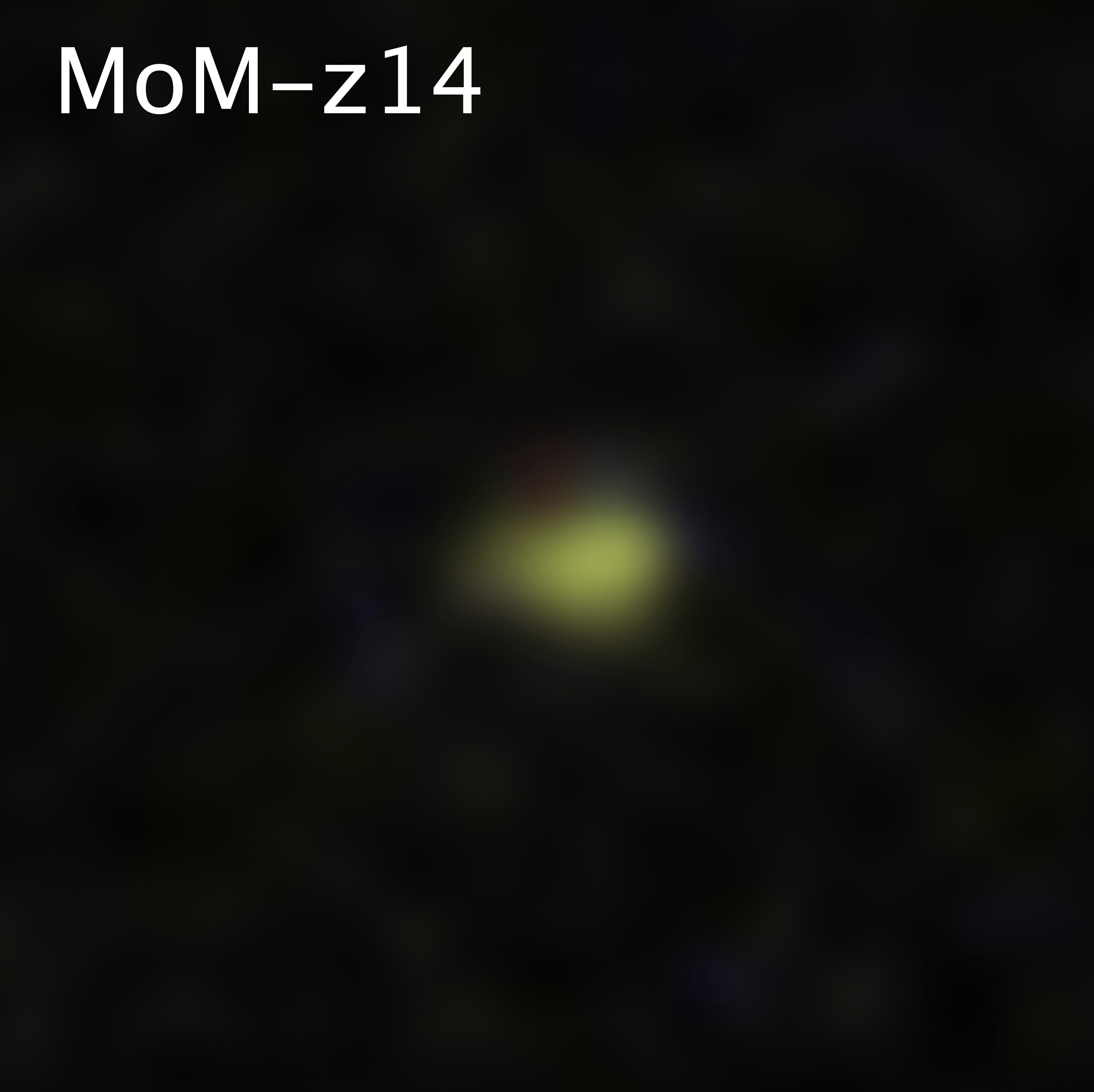
- Image of MoM-z14 taken with NIRcam on the James Webb Space Telescope

Observation data (J2000 epoch)
- Constellation: Sextans
- Right ascension: 10^{h} 00^{m} 22.40^{s}
- Declination: +02° 16′ 23.19″
- Redshift: 14.44+0.02 −0.02
- Distance: 13.53 billion light-years (light travel distance); 33.8 billion light-years (proper distance)
- Apparent magnitude (V): 20.2

Characteristics
- Type: Lyman-break galaxy
- Size: 241^{+49}_{−39} light years
- Notable features: Farthest confirmed galaxy discovered

MoM-z14 is the most distant known galaxy, with a redshift of z = 14.44. The galaxy was first imaged on May 16, 2025 by the NIRcam instrument aboard the James Webb Space Telescope (JWST). That image captured the galaxy during its formation about 280 million years after the Big Bang, during the Reionization Era of the early universe. This was the stage of cosmic evolution when neutral hydrogen began once again to ionize due to energy radiated by the earliest celestial objects.

MoM-z14 is a remarkably luminous and compact galaxy, with an effective radius of only 241^{+49}_{−39} light years, making it about one percent the size of the Milky Way. The very large degree of lookback present in high-z objects allows them to be imaged, as opposed to merely detected as points of light. This is because the light from MoM-z14 was emitted when it was far closer, and its source apparently larger, to the point in space which the space telescope that discovered it now occupies.

It contains around 10^{8} solar masses (M_{☉}), somewhat less than the Small Magellanic Cloud's 3 billion M_{☉}. At the time it was imaged, representing its appearance some 13.53 billion years ago, MoM-z14 appears to have gone through a period of rapid star formation. This enriched the metallicity of the galaxy to a level not presently accounted for in current models of early galaxy formation. This burst of star-formation also gave off large quantities of energetic photons, which have traveled through a virtually dust free interstellar medium (ISM), leaving the immediate surroundings of MoM-z14 partially ionized.

== Discovery ==
MoM-z14 was discovered on May 16, 2025 by 46 astrophysicists using the James Webb Space Telescope (JWST) as part of the Mirage or Miracle survey. Telescopes launched prior to the JWST did not have mirrors large enough to detect light coming from these distant galaxies. The Spitzer Space Telescope was an infrared telescope but was not large enough to detect MoM-z14. With its size and primary mission to study the assembly of galaxies, the JWST was able to detect MoM-z14. The name refers to the galaxy's redshift (zspec) value, z=14.

== Image gallery ==
MoM-z14 and part of the COSMOS field imaged by the James Webb Space Telescope

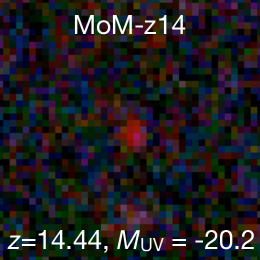
MoM-z14 has been determined to be at a redshift of z=14.44.

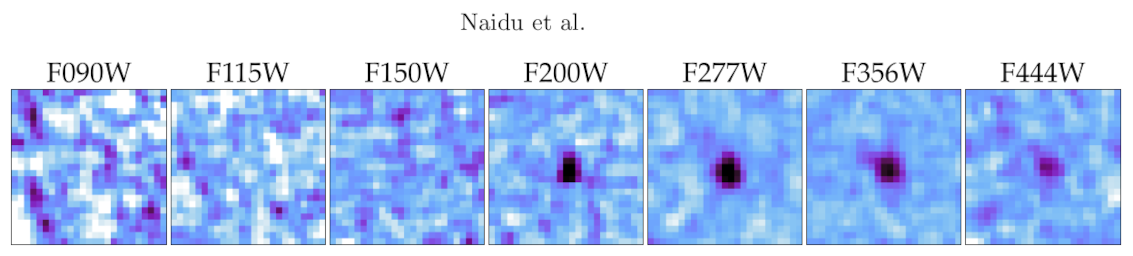
A picture showing various filters from JWST NIRCam of the most distant galaxy MoM-z-14

== See also ==
- Age of the universe
- Chronology of the universe
- Dropout (astronomy)
- JADES-GS-z14-0 – previous record holder
- List of the most distant astronomical objects

Records
| Preceded by JADES-GS-z14-0 | Most distant known astronomical object 2025– |
| Preceded by JADES-GS-z14-0 | Most distant known galaxy 2025– |
