= CEERS2-588 =

Extremely distant galaxy in constellation Boötes

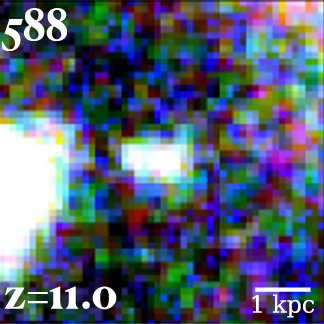
- CEERS2-588 as observed by the James Webb Space Telescope

Observation data (J2000 epoch)
- Constellation: Boötes
- Right ascension: 14^{h} 19^{m} 37,59^{s}
- Declination: +52° 56′ 43.80″
- Redshift: 11.04
- Apparent magnitude (V): 20.4

Characteristics
- Type: Lyman-break galaxy

CEERS2-588 is a Lyman-break galaxy discovered in 2022 by the Cosmic Evolution Early Release Science (CEERS) project team using the James Webb Space Telescope. It is located in the COSMOS region of the sky, an ultra-deep field that has been extensively studied by a variety of telescopes.

CEERS2-588 was identified in the Cosmic Evolution Early Release Science (CEERS) survey data, which was designed to observe the z > 10 universe. The initial observations were part of the first public data release on July 14, 2022. The galaxy was initially identified through photometric analysis and later confirmed spectroscopically by NIRSpec. The CEERS team found several bright candidates, including CEERS2-588, during the initial months of JWST's operation.

== Observations ==
On February 29, 2024, scientists proposed to reobserve the galaxy CEERS2-588, the brightest ever seen at a redshift greater than 11, with the James Webb Space Telescope. They intend to do so using the MIRI MRS instrument to search for strong optical emission lines. If they find them, they can better understand the stellar mass, star formation rate, metallicity, active galactic nucleus (AGN) activity, and burst formation of this galaxy. This should help us better understand early galaxies in general. If emission lines are not found, however, they will have to wonder how a galaxy so bright in the ultraviolet can have such faint emission lines. Astronomers will study CEERS2-588 with the MIRI MRS instrument and F560W images to better understand this galaxy.
