= PJ352–15 =

Quasar in the constellation Aquarius

Observation data (Epoch J2000.0)
- Constellation: Aquarius
- Right ascension: 23^{h} 29^{m} 36.81^{s}
- Declination: −15° 20′ 14.28″
- Redshift: 5.831
- Distance: 12.7 billion ly

PSO J352.4034–15.3373, or PJ352–15, is a quasar with an astrophysical jet ascribed to a billion-solar-mass supermassive black hole. It is one of the brightest objects so far discovered. Its discovery, using the Chandra X-Ray Observatory, was reported in March 2021. At 12.7 billion light years from Earth, the X-ray jet became an observational distance record at the time of its discovery.

== See also ==
- List of the most distant astronomical objects
- List of quasars
