= Hot, dust-obscured galaxy =

Rare type of quasar

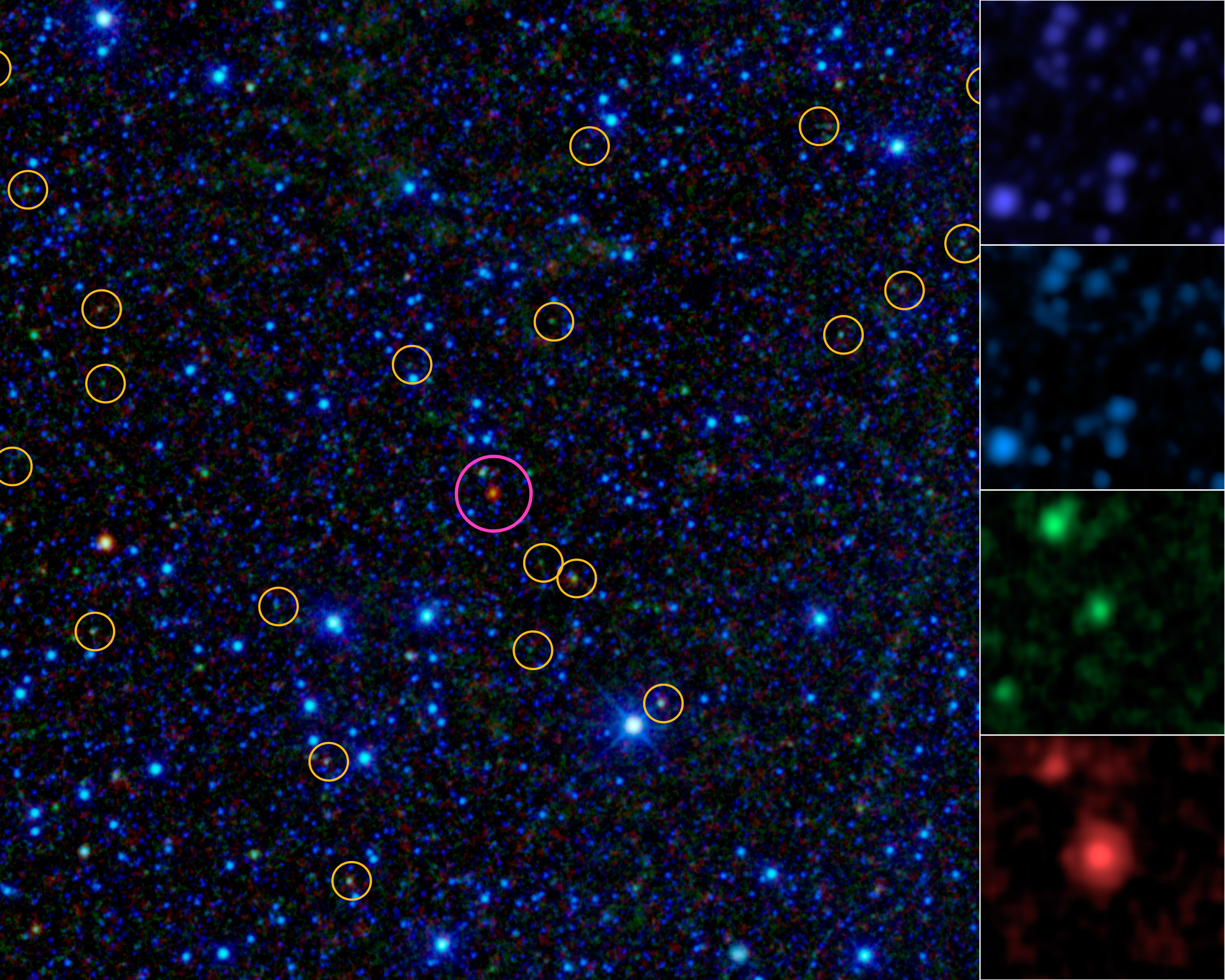
A hot, dust-obscured galaxy seen by WISE

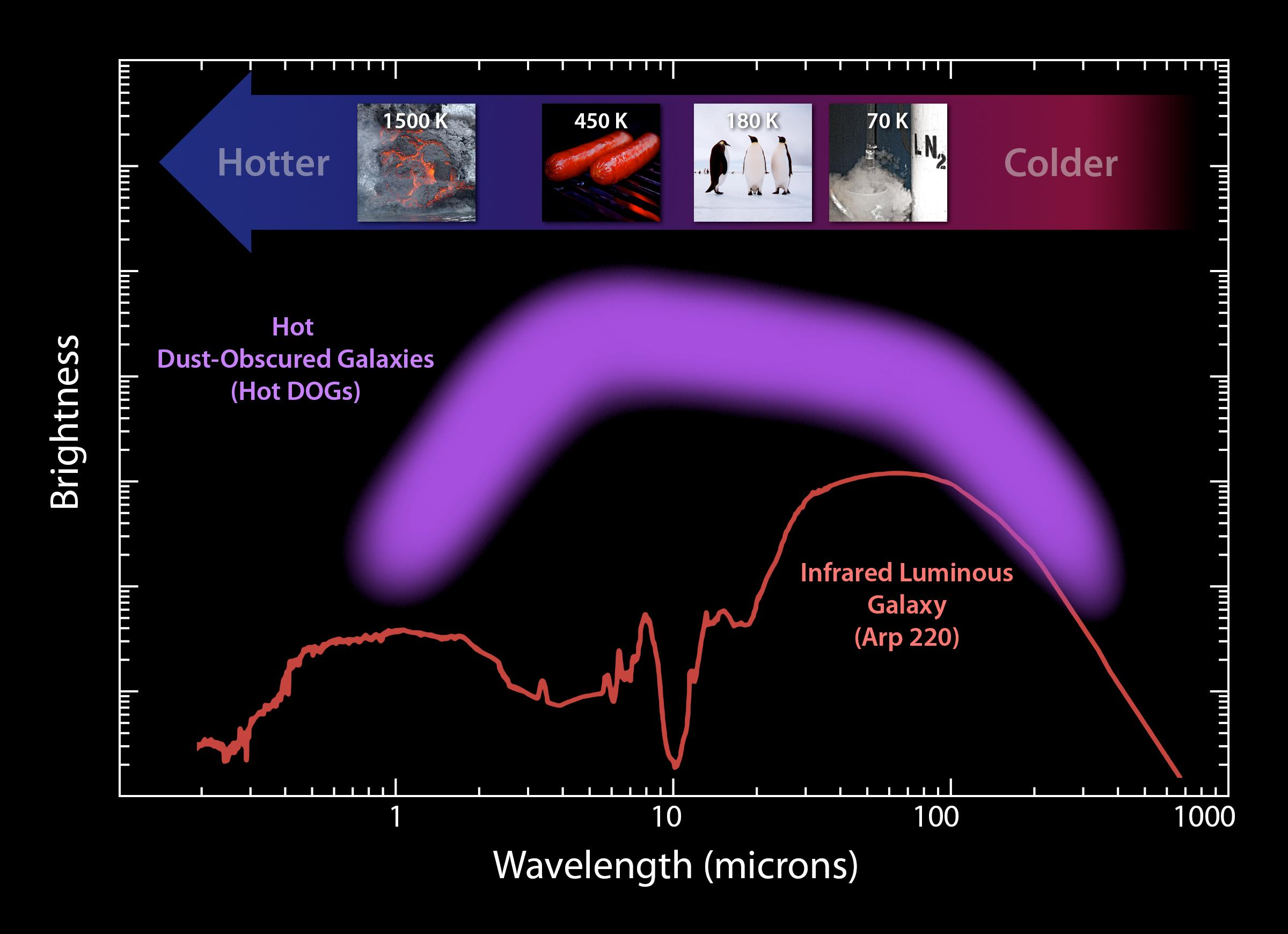
Luminosity plot for hot DOGs and a prototypical luminous infrared galaxy

A hot, dust-obscured galaxy, or hot DOG, is a rare type of quasar. The central black hole of such a galaxy emits vast amounts of radiation which heats the infalling dust and gas, releasing infrared light at a rate about 1,000 times as much as the Milky Way, making these some of the most luminous galaxies in the universe. However, the density of the surrounding dust is so great that most of that light is obscured. Their average temperatures range from 60 to 120 K (−213 to −153 °C; −352 to −244 °F), significantly higher than an average galaxy's temperature of 30 to 40 K (−243 to −233 °C; −406 to −388 °F). They also appear to concentrate a much higher proportion of their galactic mass in the central black hole than is observed in normal galaxies.

Most hot DOGs are found in the distant universe, however W1904+4853 is an example of a nearby hot DOG, at a redshift of z = 0.415. Some of the most luminous galaxies in the universe are classified as hot DOGs because the influence of the active SMBH in an environment rich with dust triggers star formation, and heats dust to glow brightly in the infrared. The most luminous galaxy in the universe, W2246-0526, with a total luminosity of $3.5\times10^{14}$ (350 trillion) suns, is classified as a hot DOG.

The environment around hot DOGs may be the densest observed for luminous, active galaxies. Photometric observations such as the identification of Lyman-break galaxies (LBG) are used to study surrounding companion galaxies to these quasars. The overdensity of LBG candidates concentrate around the hot DOGs, which may suggest that these quasars are either an early stage proto-cluster or that they can be used as good tracers of proto-clusters.

Researchers believe that hot DOGs may represent a phase of galactic evolution where the central black hole is capturing material at a rate faster than new stars are forming, yet the radiation pressure from that rapid absorption is pushing away much of that surrounding material. The black hole will eventually clear its area of influence of the excessive dust and gas, rendering it a regular, visible galaxy.

Since these quasars are surrounded and obscured by large amounts of dust, they are believed to be a key stage of Active Galactic Nucleus (AGN) evolution and black hole growth. These systems grow by mergers, and the heightened process of accretion may trigger the AGN activity. Hot DOGs along with their companion galaxies have obscured AGN activity and fast rotating molecular disks, which is promoted by the evolution stage that the hot DOGs are in.

These objects were first detected by the Wide-field Infrared Survey Explorer (WISE) in 2010, and only one out of every 3,000 quasars observed by WISE are of this type. Wu et al (2012) refer to these galaxies as "W1W2-dropouts" because they are faint or invisible in WISE's W1 (3.4 μm) and W2 (4.6 μm) detection bands.

== See also ==
- Luminous infrared galaxy
