= Dropout (astronomy) =

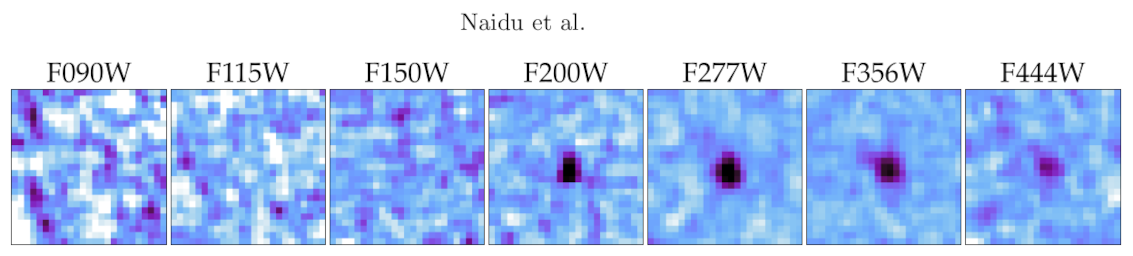
A picture showing various filters from JWST NIRCam of the most distant galaxy, MoM-z14.

In astronomy, dropout is a radiation source whose radiation intensity falls off sharply above or below a specific wavelength. The source will be easily visible when its light is filtered to wavelengths longer than the cutoff value, but will "drop out" of the image when it is filtered to wavelengths shorter than the threshold.

This is a standard method for locating distant galaxies in deep field images. Because the hydrogen that surrounds the galaxies absorbs light with a wavelength around 100 nanometers, the galaxies have a natural dropout threshold. The exact wavelength of this threshold is redshifted and can be used to determine the distance to the galaxy. A filter dropout from MoM-z14 is shown where "NIRCam images spanning the wavelengths 0.9-5μm show a compact source detected at ≳ 2μm that is entirely absent in bluer bands".

== See also ==
- Lyman-break galaxy
