= BDF-521 =

Galaxy in the constellation Piscis Austrinus

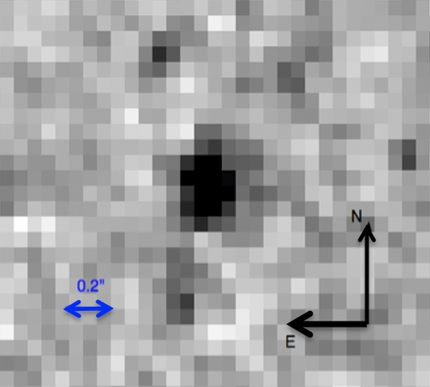
- BDF-521 imaged by the Hubble Space Telescope F125W filter.

Observation data (J2000 epoch)
- Constellation: Piscis Austrinus
- Right ascension: 22^{h} 27^{m} 46.66^{s}
- Declination: −35° 07′ 07.7″
- Redshift: 7.008
- Distance: 12.9 billion light-years (light travel distance)
- Apparent magnitude (V): 28

Other designations
- CFP2010 BDF 521

BDF-521 is a distant galaxy with a redshift of z = 7.008, corresponding to a distance traveled by light to come down to Earth of 12.89 billion light years.

== See also ==
- List of the most distant astronomical objects
- List of galaxies
