= Gz9p3 =

Galaxy merger in the constellation Sculptor

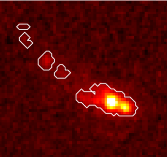
- Image of Gz9p3, as seen by JWST NIRCam

Observation data
- Constellation: Sculptor
- Right ascension: 00^{h} 14^{m} 28.12^{s}
- Declination: −30° 25′ 31.93″
- Redshift: 9.3127±0.0002
- Distance: 13.4 billion light years (Light travel distance)

Characteristics
- Type: Lyman-break galaxy, galaxy merger

Gz9p3 is a high-redshift Lyman-break galaxy discovered by the James Webb Space Telescope on 2023, it is estimated to have formed only 510 million years after the Big Bang, making it the brightest galaxy merger known from such an early epoch in the Universe.

== Morphology ==
Gz9p3 displays a "double" nucleus, a clear sign of a recent merger between two galaxies. This event contributed to its enormous mass, about 10 times greater than that of other similar galaxies observed at the same time. The merger triggered intense star formation activity, with a star creation rate in the central part of about 10 solar masses per year and an estimated total of 1000 solar masses per year. The galaxy is rich in cosmic dust, which obscures part of its light and makes detailed study of its structure difficult.
