= A1703 zD6 =

Lyman-alpha emitter

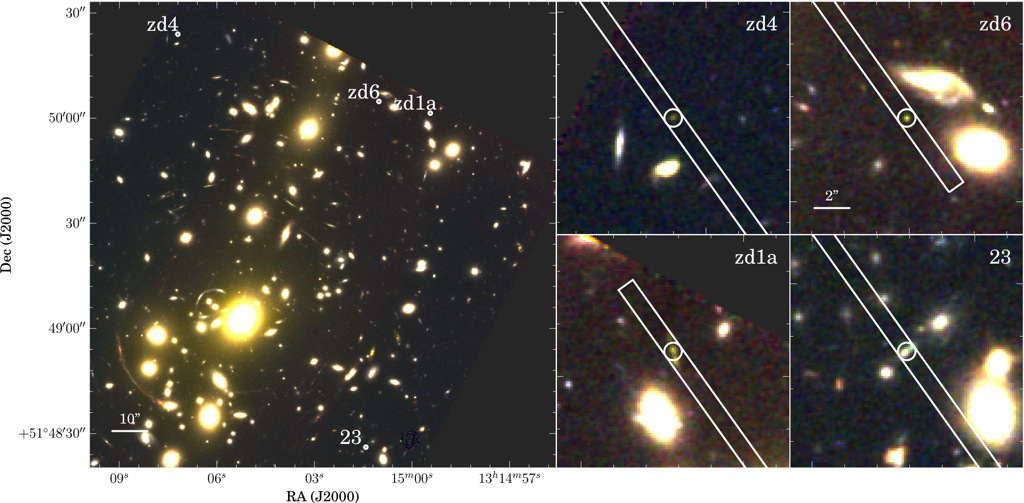
- A1703 zD6 (top right)

Observation data (J2000 epoch)
- Constellation: Canes Venatici
- Right ascension: 13^{h} 15^{m} 01.0068^{s}
- Declination: +51° 50′ 04.353″
- Redshift: 7.045
- Heliocentric radial velocity: 2,112,038 km/s (1,312,360 mi/s)
- Galactocentric velocity: 2,112,133 km/s (1,312,419 mi/s)
- Distance: 12.9 billion ly (4.0 billion pc) (light travel distance); 29 billion ly (8.9 billion pc) (comoving distance)
- Apparent magnitude (V): 25.8J

Other designations
- [BBZ2012] A1703-zD6

A1703 zD6 is a strongly lensed Lyman-alpha emitter. It is located behind a foreground galaxy cluster known as Abell 1703, hence its name. It has a spectroscopically determined redshift of over 7, corresponding to a light travel time of 12.9 billion years. It is located in the constellation Canes Venatici. It was discovered in 2012, by a group led by L. D. Bradley, published in The Astrophysical Journal.

The C IV emission line (with a wavelength of 1548 Å) was detected from this galaxy, signifying triply ionized carbon. Because it takes high amounts of energy to triply ionize carbon, it may suggest that A1703 zD6 has an active galactic nucleus (AGN), or a population of very young, hot, and metal-poor stars. Subsequent investigations found that the ionization source is likely to be the latter: a cluster of stars (abbreviated SF, for star-forming region).
