= MACS0416 Y1 =

Massive merger with extreme dust properties

MACS0416-Y1
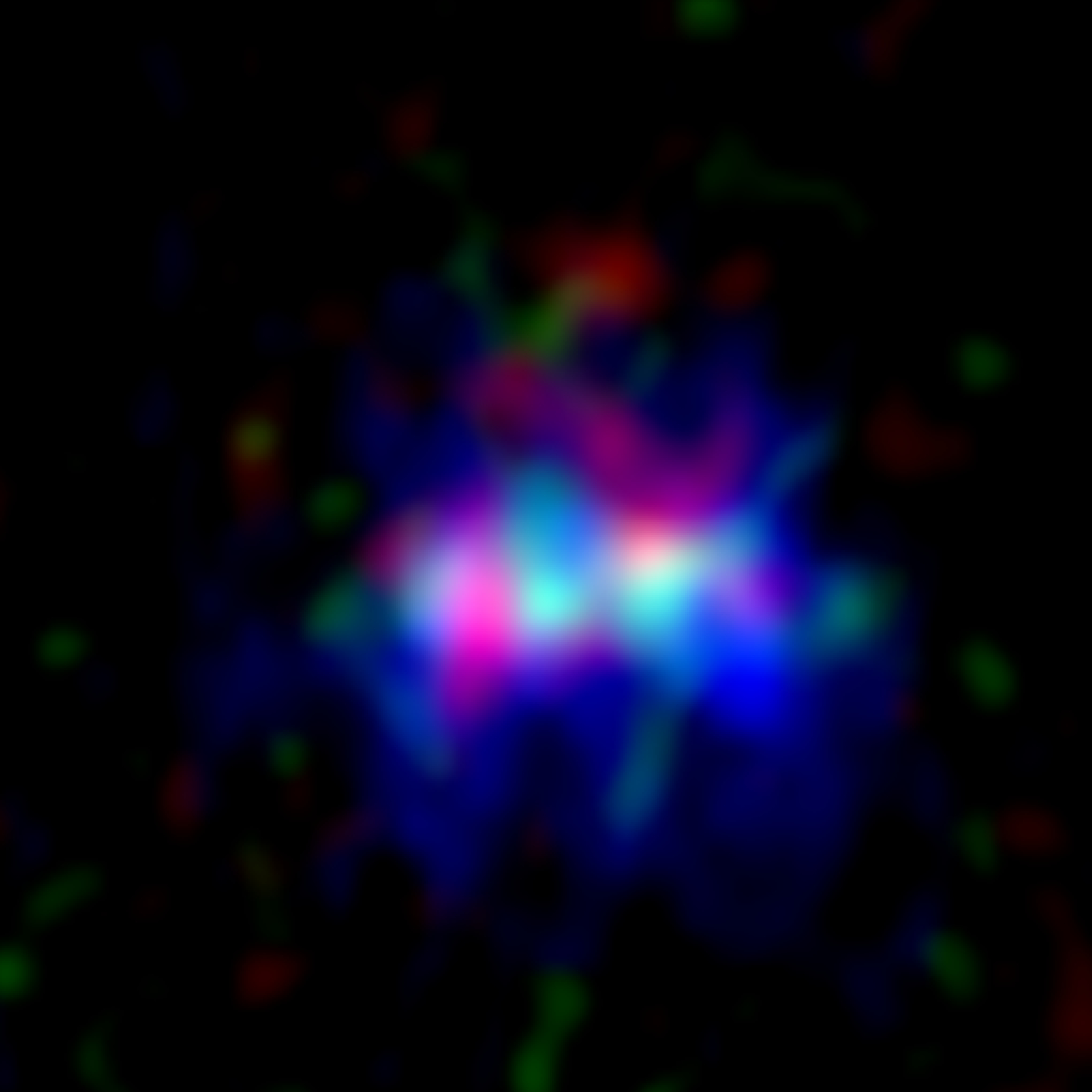
- Image of MACS0416 Y1 taken with the ALMA telescope

Observation data
- Constellation: Eridanus
- Right ascension: 04^{h} 16^{m} 09.46^{s}
- Declination: −24° 05′ 35″
- Redshift: 8.312

Characteristics
- Type: Merger
- Notable features: Extreme dust properties

MACS0416 Y1 is a massive, gas-rich galaxy that is undergoing a major merging event located at a distance of redshift z = 8.312. The galaxy has extreme dust properties with an evolved interstellar medium. MACS0416 Y1 is currently undergoing burst of stellar formation as well. Theses bursts in star formation are in three resolved clumps. The central clump is the least massive out of the three and formed possibly from the merging of the other two clumps.

It was observed by the CAnadian NIRISS Unbiased Cluster Survey (CANUCS).

== Dust properties ==
MACS0416 Y1 has several notable properties related to Cosmic dust. The mass of the dust inside the MACS0416 Y1 is estimated to be 4×10^{6} solar masses. The interstellar medium (ISM) of MACS0416 Y1 resembles galaxies at the cosmic noon, located at redshift distances of z = ~2. The gas and dust inside MACS0416 Y1 is also ionized by the active galactic nucleus (AGN) and heated to high temperatures (approximately 95 Kelvin) by the burst of star formation also observed in the galaxy, see below.

== Star formation ==
The merger of the galaxy has produced three resolved clumps where there is a burst of stellar formation with the central clump being the least massive and possibly formed from a merger of the other two regions. Around 60 solar masses of stars are formed per year in MACS0416 Y1, and the high star formation rate (SFR) of MACS0416 Y1 heats up the dust inside the rest of the system to high temperatures. These stars have also been polluted by metals from outside their normal formation processes (metallicity).
