= BzK galaxy =

In astrophysics, a BzK galaxy is a galaxy that has been selected as star-forming or passive based on its photometry in the B, z, and K photometric bands.

The selection criteria, as originally defined, are as follows:

- Star-forming BzK (sBzK) galaxies satisfy: $BzK \equiv (z-K)_{AB} - (B-z)_{AB} \geq -0.2$
- Passive BzK (pBzK) galaxies satisfy: $BzK < -0.2$ and $(z-K)_{AB} > 2.5$

== See also ==
- Lyman-break galaxy – Star-forming galaxies at high redshift
