= A2744 YD4 =

Galaxy in the constellation Sculptor

A2744_YD4
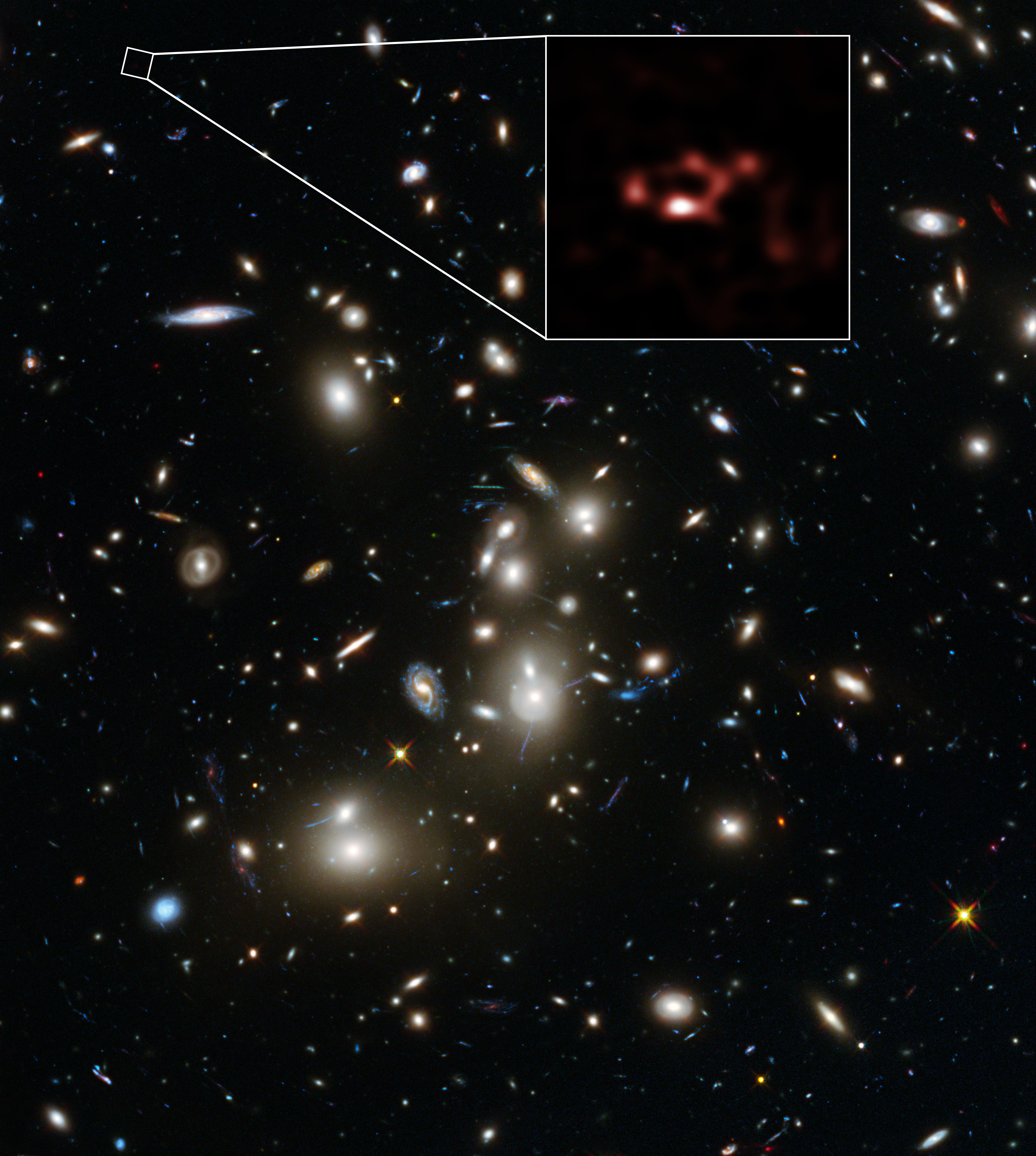
- Image of A2744 YD4 taken with the Hubble Space Telescope

Observation data (J2000 epoch)
- Constellation: Sculptor
- Right ascension: 00^{h} 14^{m} 24.927^{s}
- Declination: −30° 22′ 56.15″
- Redshift: 8.38
- Distance: 13.2 billion light years (light-travel distance)

Other designations
- [ZSM2014] YD4

A2744_YD4 is a very distant young galaxy. This galaxy has first been identified as a possible distant galaxy in 2015 using the Hubble Space Telescope. This detection was made possible because this galaxy lies behind the massive galaxy cluster Abell 2744. In 2017, ALMA observed it and detected a small quantity of dust (the most distant stardust to date) and the first signature of Oxygen emitting light only 600 million years after the Big Bang.
