= NIRSpec =

Spectrograph on the James Webb Space Telescope

Near-Infrared Spectrograph
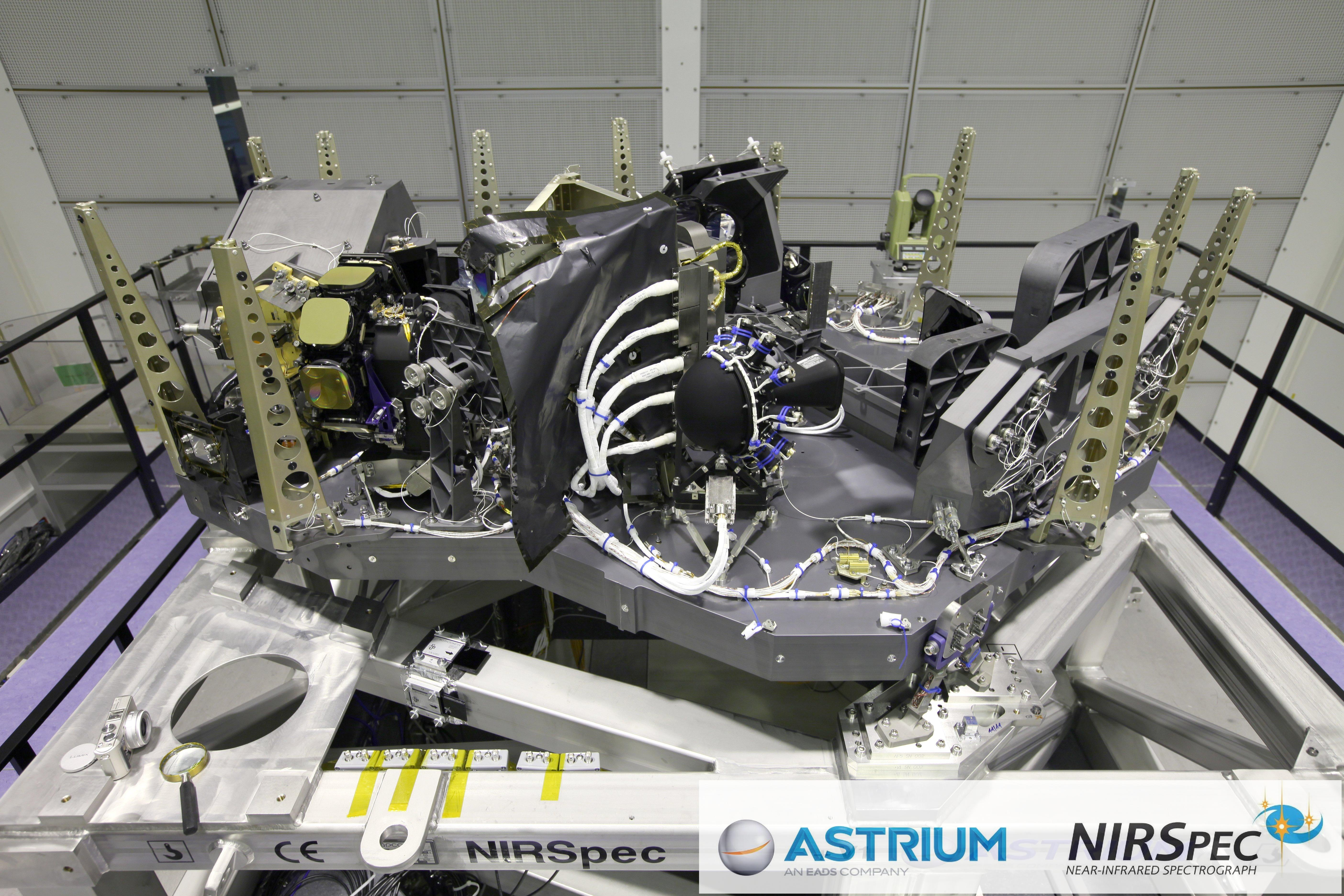
- NIRSpec Instrument within the Astrium Cleanroom in Ottobrunn, Germany
- Mission type: Astronomy
- Operator: ESA with contributions from NASA
- Website: ESA Europe; Astrium Germany; NASA United States
- Mission duration: 5 years (design); 10 years (goal)

Spacecraft properties
- Manufacturer: Astrium
- Launch mass: 196 kg (432 lb)

Start of mission
- Launch date: December 25, 2021
- Rocket: As part of JWST onboard Ariane 5
- Launch site: Kourou ELA-3
- Contractor: Arianespace

Main telescope
- Type: Spectrograph
- Wavelengths: 0.6 μm (orange) to 5.0 μm (near-infrared)

The NIRSpec (Near-Infrared Spectrograph) is one of the four scientific instruments flown on the James Webb Space Telescope (JWST). The JWST is the follow-on mission to the Hubble Space Telescope (HST) and was developed to receive more information about the origins of the universe by observing infrared light from the first stars and galaxies. In comparison to HST, its instruments look further back in time and study the so-called Dark Ages during which the universe was opaque, about 150 to 800 million years after the Big Bang.

The NIRSpec instrument is a multi-object spectrograph and is capable of simultaneously measuring the near-infrared spectrum of up to 100 objects like stars or galaxies with low, medium and high spectral resolutions. The observations are performed in a 3 arcmin × 3 arcmin field of view over the wavelength range from 0.6 μm to 5.0 μm. It also features a set of slits and an aperture for high contrast spectroscopy of individual sources, as well as an integral-field unit (IFU) for 3D spectroscopy. The instrument is a contribution of the European Space Agency (ESA) and is built by Astrium together with a group of European subcontractors.

== Overview ==
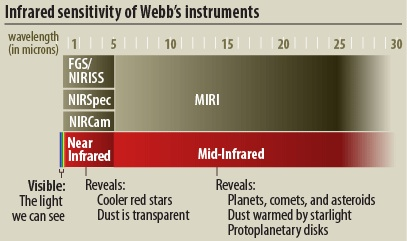
Infographic of the James Webb Space Telescope instruments and their observation ranges of light by wavelength

The James Webb Space Telescope's main science themes are:

- First light and reionization
- the assembly of galaxies,
- the birth of stars and protoplanetary systems
- the birth of planetary systems and the origins of life

The NIRSpec instrument operates at −235 °C and is passively cooled by cold space radiators which are mounted on the JWST Integrated Science Instrument Module (ISIM). The radiators are connected to NIRSpec using thermally conductive heat straps. The mirror mounts and the optical bench base plate all manufactured out of silicon carbide ceramic SiC100. The instrument size is approximately 1900 mm × 1400 mm × 700 mm and weighs 196 kg (432 lb) including 100 kg of silicon carbide. The operation of the instrument is performed with three electronic boxes.

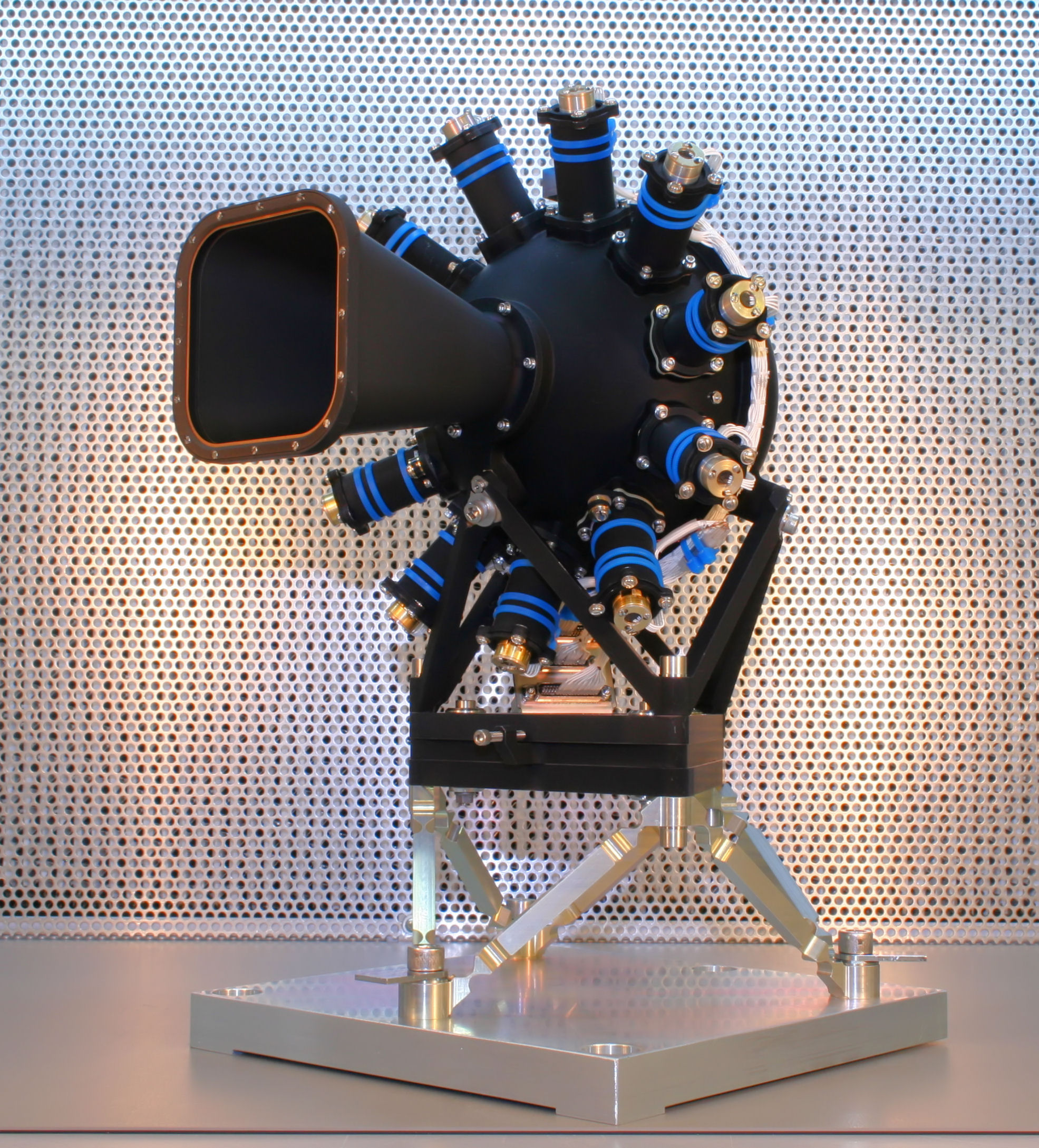
The Calibration Assembly, one component of the NIRSpec, at University College London prior to integration.

NIRSpec includes 4 mechanisms which are:

- the Filter Wheel Assembly (FWA) – 8 positions, carrying 4 long pass filters for science, 2 broadband filters for target acquisition, one closed and one open position
- the Refocus Mechanism Assembly (RMA) – carrying 2 mirrors for instrument refocusing
- the Micro Shutter Assembly (MSA) – for multi-object spectroscopy but also carrying the fixed slits and IFU aperture
- the Grating Wheel Assembly (GWA) – 8 positions, carrying 6 gratings and one prism for science and one mirror for target acquisition

Further NIRSpec includes two electro-optical assemblies which are:

- Calibration Assembly (CAA) – carrying 11 illumination sources and an integrating sphere; for instrument internal spectral and flat-field calibration
- Focal Plane Assembly (FPA) – includes the focal plane which consists of 2 sensor chip assemblies

And finally the Integral Field Unit (IFU) image slicer, used in the instrument IFU mode.

The optical path is represented by the following silicon carbide mirror assemblies:

- the Coupling Optics Assembly – which couples the light from the JWST telescope into NIRSpec
- the Fore Optics TMA (FOR) – which provides the intermediate focal plane for the MSA
- the Collimator Optics TMA (COL) – collimating the light onto the Grating Wheel dispersive element
- the Camera Optics TMA (CAM) – which finally images the spectra on the detector

== Science objectives ==
- The end of the Dark Ages – first light and re-ionization: Near-infrared spectroscopy (NIRS) at spectral resolutions around 100 and 1000 for studying the first light sources (stars, galaxies and active nuclei) that mark the beginning of the phase of re-ionization of the Universe that is believed to take place between redshifts 15–14 and 6.
- The assembly of galaxies: Near-infrared multi-object spectroscopic observations (redshift range typically from 1 to 7) at spectral resolutions around 1000 observation of a large number of galaxies and spatially-resolved NIRS at spectral resolutions around 1000 and 3000 in order to conduct detailed studies of a smaller number of objects.
- The birth of stars and planetary systems: Near-infrared high-contrast slit spectroscopy at spectral resolution ranging from 100 to several thousands in order to gain a more complete view of the formation and evolution of the stars and their planetary systems.
- Planetary systems and the origin of life: In order to observe various components of the Solar System (from planets and satellites to comets and Kuiper belt objects) as well as of extra-solar planetary systems, high-contrast and spatially resolved NIRS at medium to high spectral resolution while maintaining high relative spectro-photometric stability is required.

== Operational modes ==
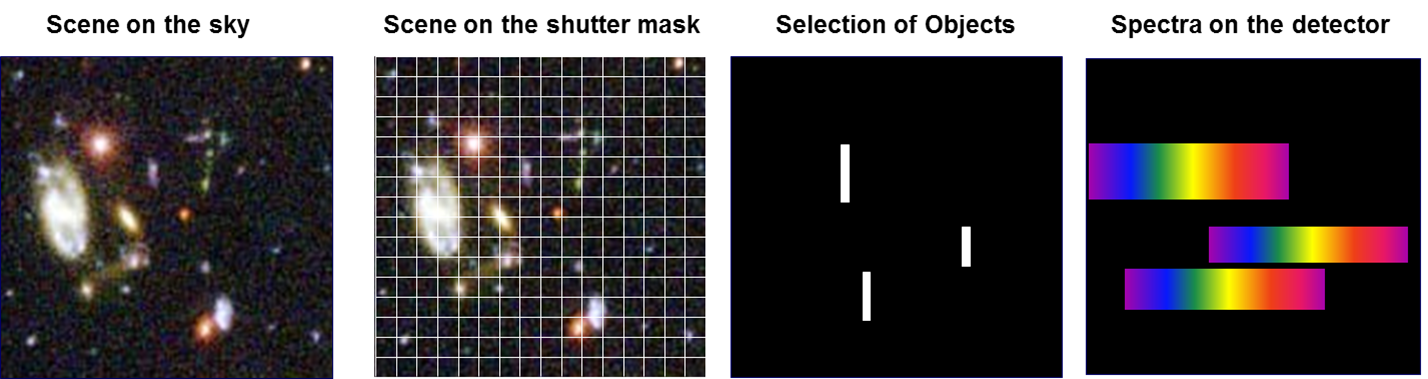
Basic principle of Multi-Object Spectroscopy

In order to achieve the scientific objectives NIRSpec has four operational modes:

Multi-Object Spectroscopy (MOS) In MOS the total instrument field of view of 3 × 3 arcminutes is covered using 4 arrays of programmable slit masks. These programmable slit masks consist of 250 000 micro shutters where each can individually be programmed to 'open' or 'closed'. The contrast between an 'open' or 'closed' shutter is better than 1:2000. If an object like e.g. a galaxy is placed into an 'open' shutter, the spectra of the light emitted by the object can be dispersed and imaged onto the detector plane. In this mode up to 100 objects can simultaneously be observed and the spectra be measured.

Integral Field Unit Mode (IFU) The integral field spectrometry will primarily be used for large, extended objects like galaxies. In this mode a 3 × 3 arcsecond field of view is sliced into 0.1 arcsecond bands which are thereafter re-arranged into a long slit. This allows to obtain spatially resolved spectra of large scenes and can be used to measure the motion speed and direction within an extended object. Since measured spectra in the IFU mode would overlap with spectra of the MOS mode it can not be used in parallel.

High-Contrast Slit Spectroscopy (SLIT)

A set of 5 fixed slits are available in order to perform high contrast spectroscopic observations which is e.g. required for spectroscopic observations of transiting extra-solar planets. Of the five fixed slits, three are 0.2 arcseconds wide, one is 0.4 arcsecond wide and one is a square aperture of 1.6 arcseconds. The SLIT mode can be used simultaneously with the MOS or IFU modes.

Imaging Mode (IMA)

The imaging mode is used for target acquisition only. In this mode no dispersive element is placed in the optical path and any objects are directly imaged on the detector. Since the microshutter array which is sitting in an instrument intermediate focal plan is imaged in parallel, it is possible to arrange the JWST observatory such that any to be observed objects fall directly into the center of open shutters (MOS-mode), the IFU aperture (IFU-mode) or the slits (SLIT mode).

== Performance parameters ==
The NIRSpec key performance parameters are:

| PARAMETER | VALUE |
|---|---|
| Wavelength range | 0.6 μm – 5.0 μm When operating in R = 1000 and R = 2700 mode, split in three spectral bands: 1.0 μm – 1.8 μm Band I 1.7 μm – 3.0 μm Band II; 2.9 μm – 5.0 μm Band III |
| Field of View | 3 × 3 arcmin |
| Spectral resolution | R = 100 (MOS); R = 1000 (MOS + fixed Slits); R = 2700 (fixed Slits + IFU) |
| Number of commandable open/ closed spectrometer slits | MEMS technology based on micro-shutter arrays with 4 times 365 × 171 = 250 000 individual shutters, each of them with a size of 80 μm × 180 μm |
| Detector | 2 MCT Sensor Chip Assemblies (SCA's) of 2048 × 2048 pixels each. Pixel pitch = 18 μm × 18 μm |
| Wavefront Error, including Telescope | Diffraction limited at 2.45 μm at MSA: WFE = 185 nm RMS (Strehl = 0.80); Diffraction limited at 3.17 μm at FPA: WFE = 238 nm RMS (Strehl = 0.80) |
| Limiting sensitivity | * In R = 1000 mode, using one single 200 mas wide shutter or fixed slit, NIRSpec will be capable of measuring the flux in an unresolved emission line of 5.2×10^{−22} Wm^{−2} from a point source at an observed wavelength of 2 μm at SNR = 10 per resolution element in a total exposure of 10^{5} s or less * In R = 100 mode, using one single 200 mas wide shutter or fixed slit, NIRSpec will be capable of measuring the continuum flux of 1.2×10^{−33} Wm^{−2}Hz^{−1} from a point source at an observed wavelength of 3 μm at SNR = 10 per resolution element in a total exposure of 10^{4} s or less |
| NIRSpec optics envelope | Approximately 1900 mm × 1400 mm × 700 mm |
| Instrument mass | 195 kg (430 lb) with about 100 kg silicon carbide parts, Electronic boxes: 30.5 kg (67 lb) |
| Operating temperature | 38 K (−235.2 °C; −391.3 °F) |

.

== Industrial partners ==
NIRSpec has been built by Astrium Germany with subcontractors and partners spread over Europe and with the contribution of NASA from the US which provided the Detector Subsystem and the Micro-shutter Assembly.

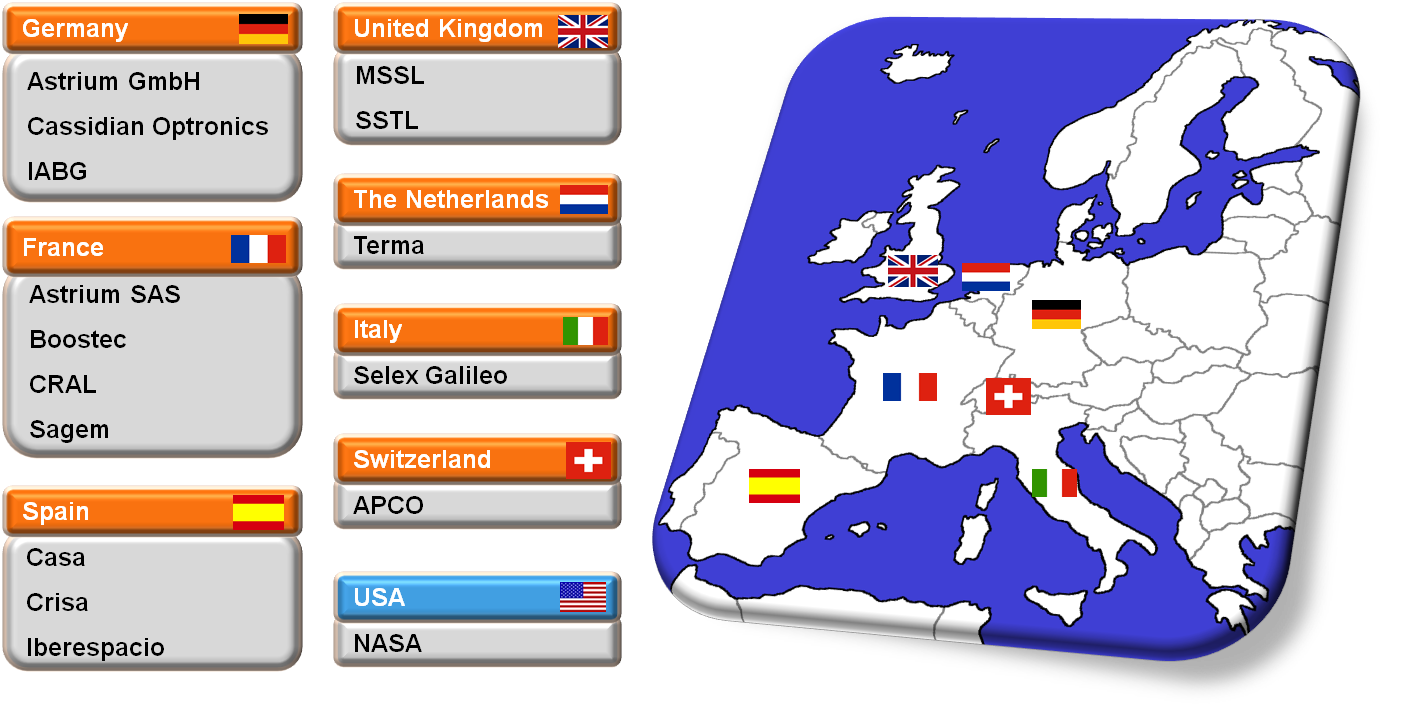
NIRSpec industrial partners

The individual subcontractors and their corresponding contributions were:

- APCO Technologies SA – Mechanical Ground Support Equipment and Kinematic Mounts
- Astrium CASA Espacio – Optical Instrument Harness
- Astrium CRISA – Instrument Control Electronic and Software
- Astrium SAS – Silicon Carbide (SiC) Engineering Support
- Astrophysikalisches Institut Potsdam (AIP) – Instrument Quick Look, Analysis and Calibration Software Contribution
- Boostec – SiC Mirrors and Structures Manufacturing
- Cassidian Optronics:
  - Filter Wheel Assembly
  - Grating Wheel Assembly
- Centre de Rechereche Astrophysique de Lyon (CRAL) – Instrument Performance Simulator
- European Space Agency (ESA) – NIRSpec Customer
- Iberespacio – Optical Assembly Cover
- Industrieanlagen-Betriebsgesellschaft mbH (IABG) – Instrument Test Facilities
- Mullard Space Science Laboratory (MSSL):
  - Calibration Assembly
  - Optical Ground Support Equipment (Shack-Hartman-Sensor, Calibration Light Source)
- National Aeronautics and Space Administration (NASA) – Customer Furnished Items:
  - Detector Subsytem
  - Microshutter Subsystem
- Sagem – Mirror Polishing and Mirror Assembly, Integration and Testing
- Selex Galileo – Refocus Mechanism
- Surrey Satellite Technology Ltd (SSTL) – Integral Field Unit
- Terma – Electrical Ground Support Equipment (Data Handling System)

== Images ==
Multi-Object Spectroscopy (MOS)

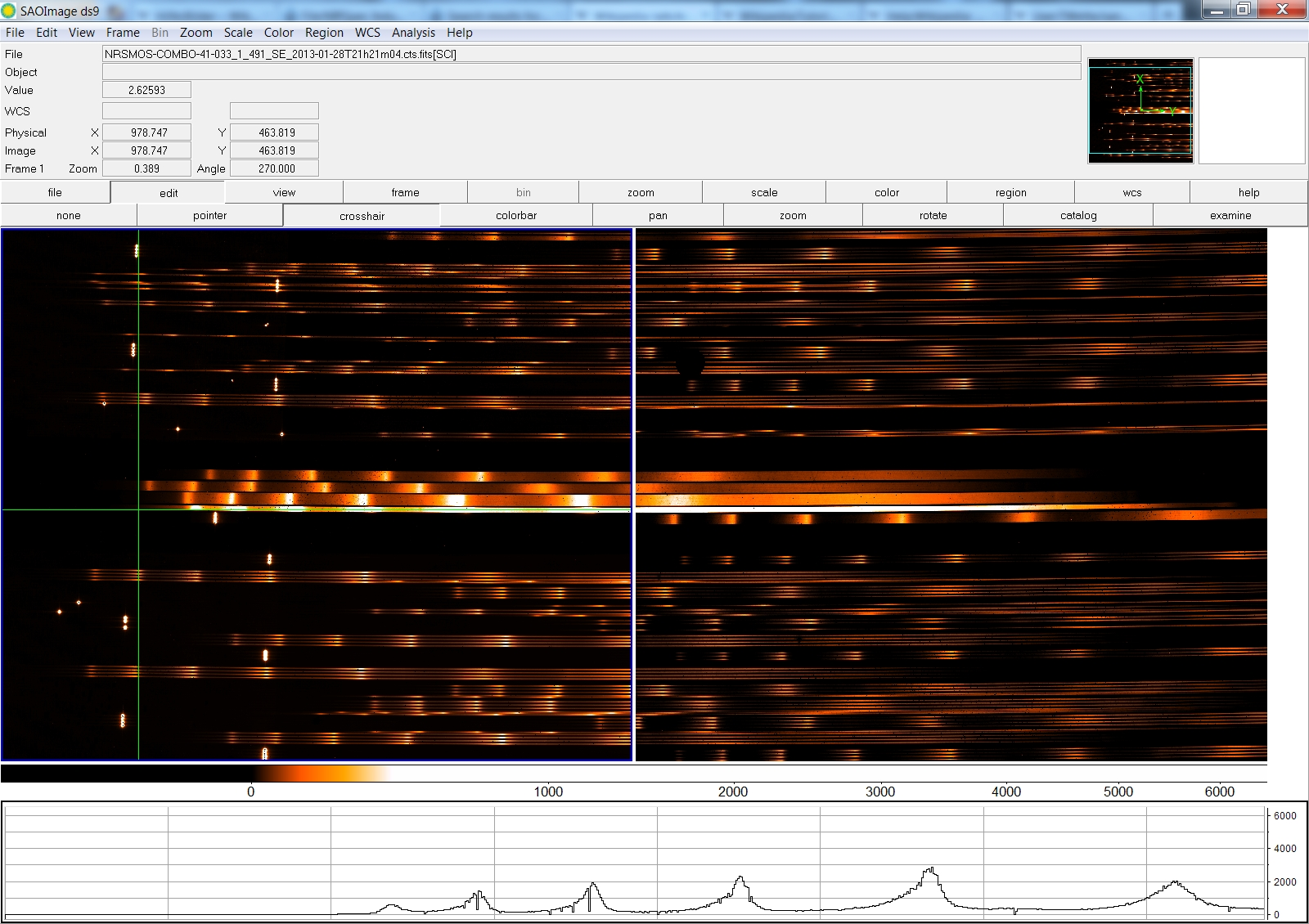
NIRSpec in Multi-Object Mode. The image shows the spectra of a Spectral Line Calibration Lamp (Fabry–Perot type) imaged onto the 2 detector Sensor Chip Assemblies (SCA)

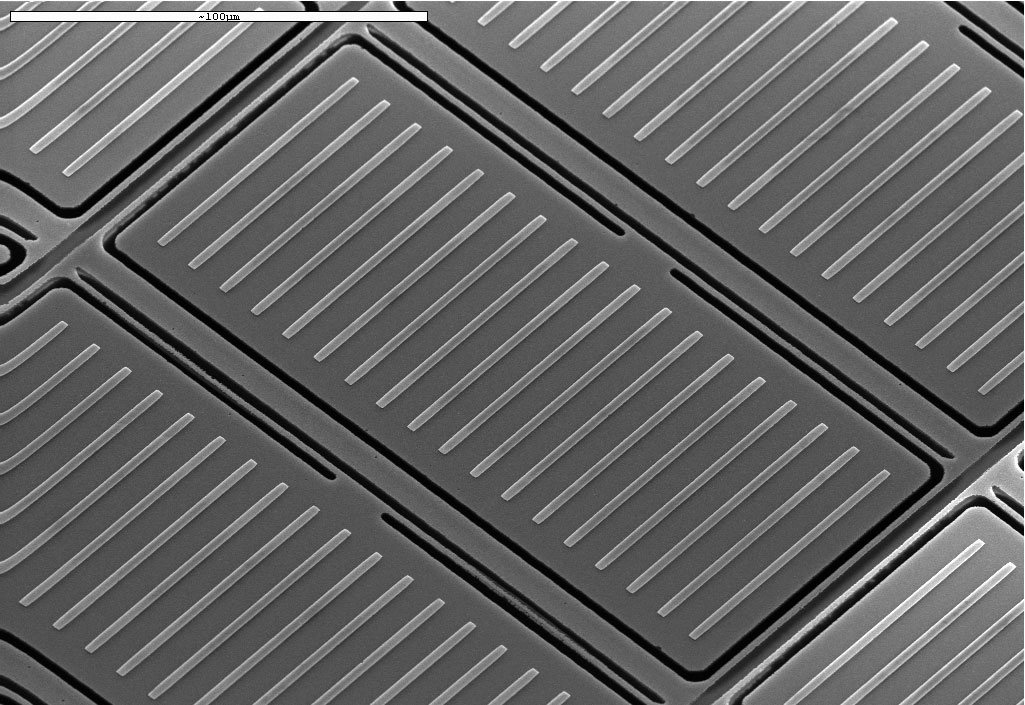
Microshutter closeup

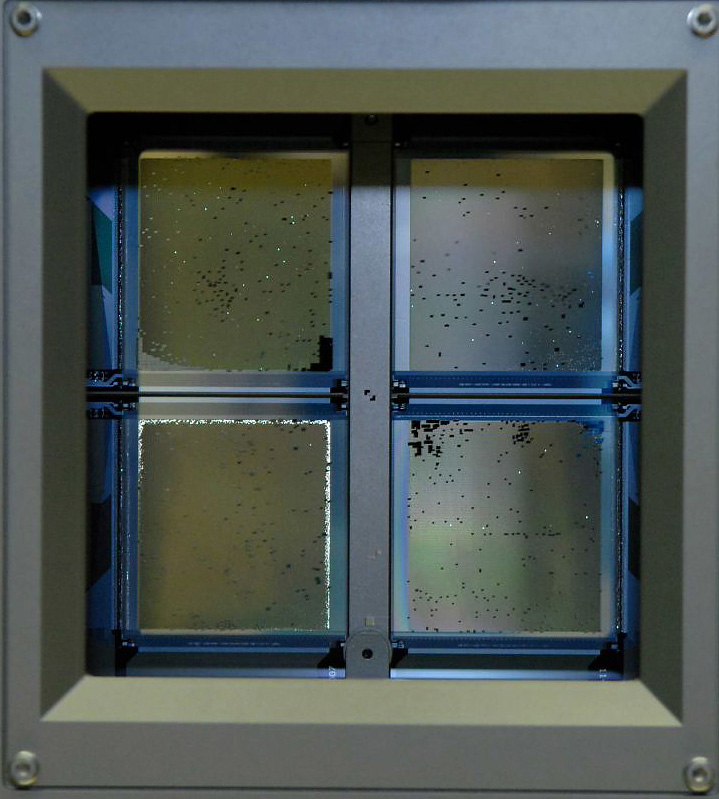
NIRSpec Microshutter arrays

Integral Field Unit

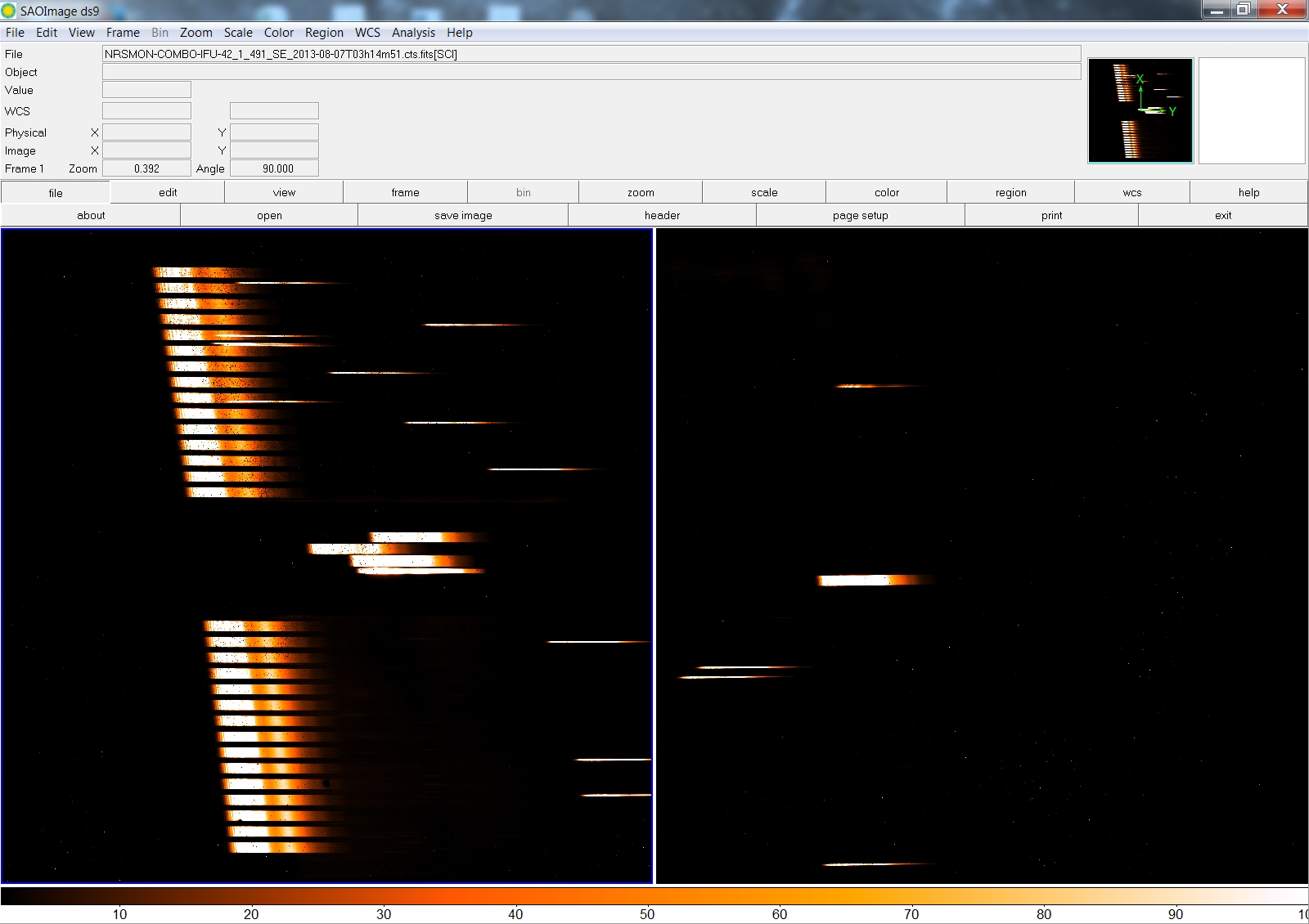
NIRSpec in IFU Mode. The image shows the spectra of a Spectral Line Calibration Lamp (Fabry–Perot type) imaged onto the 2 detector SCA's.

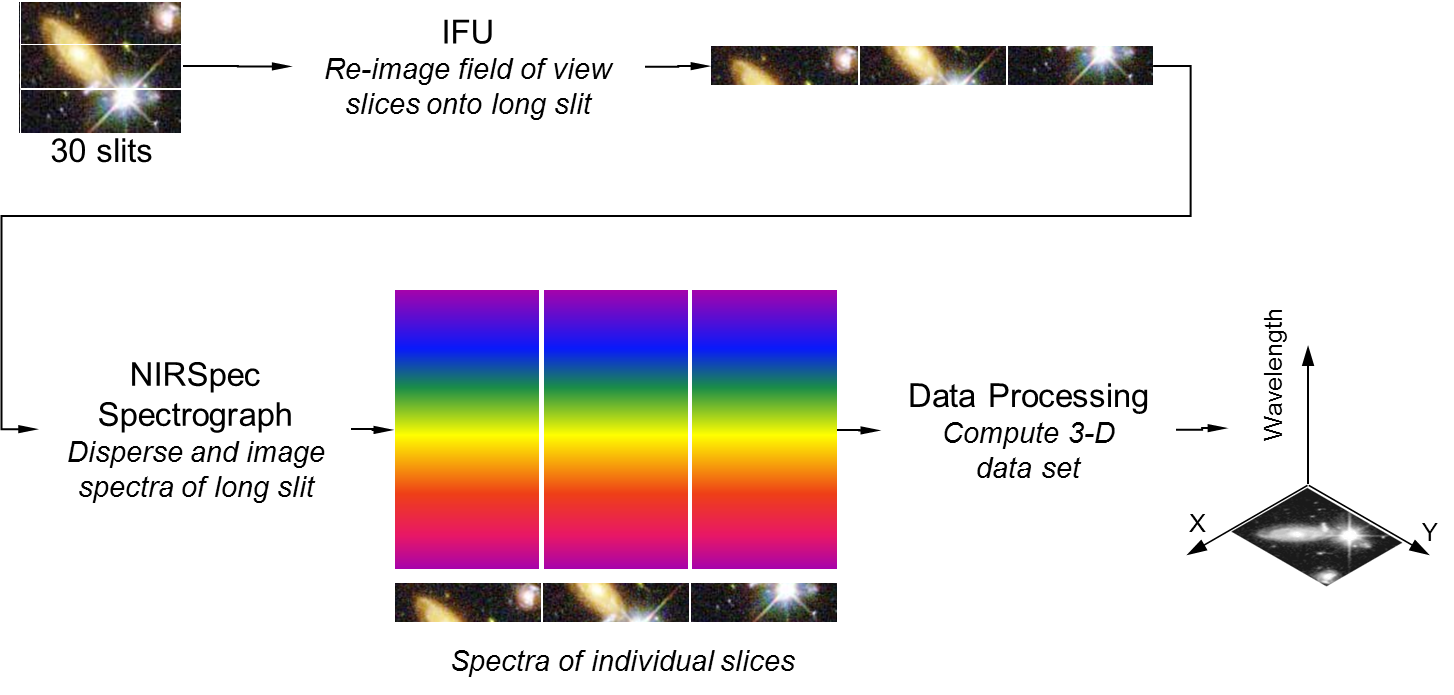
Basic principle of Integral Field Spectroscopy
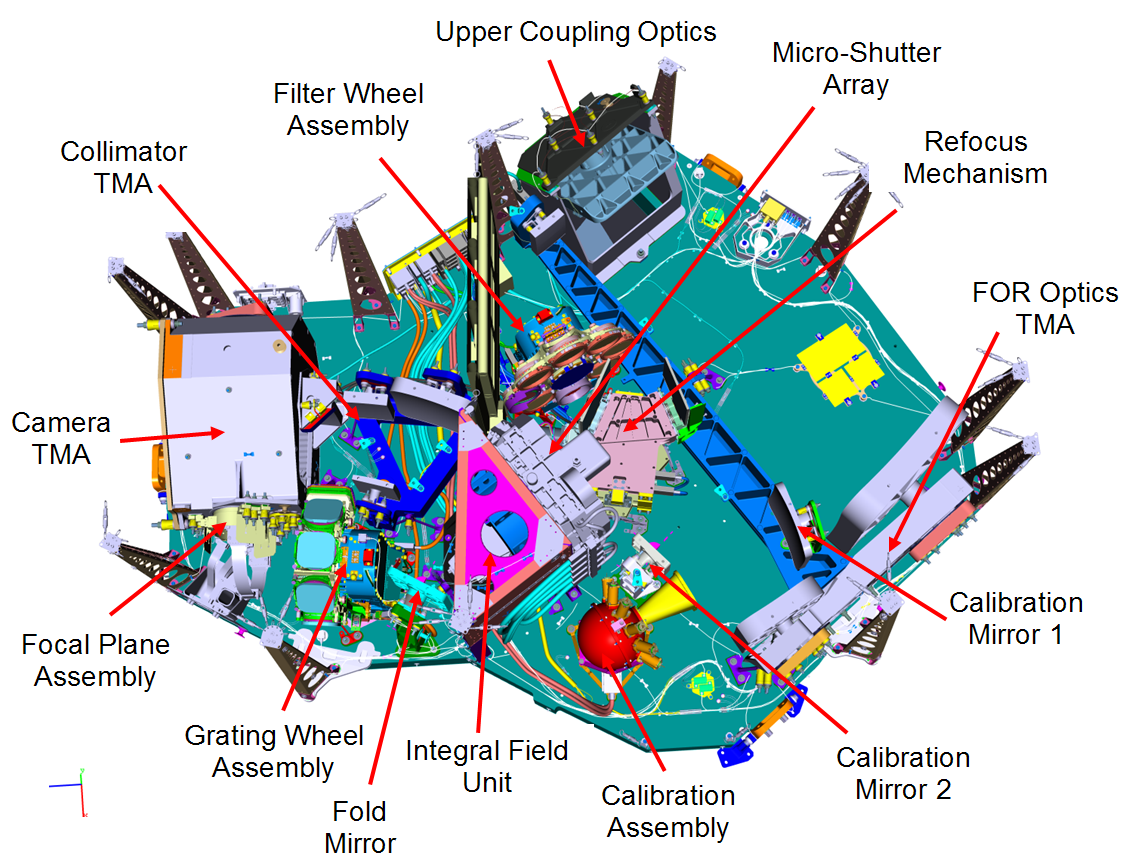
NIRSpec CAD view with main assemblies

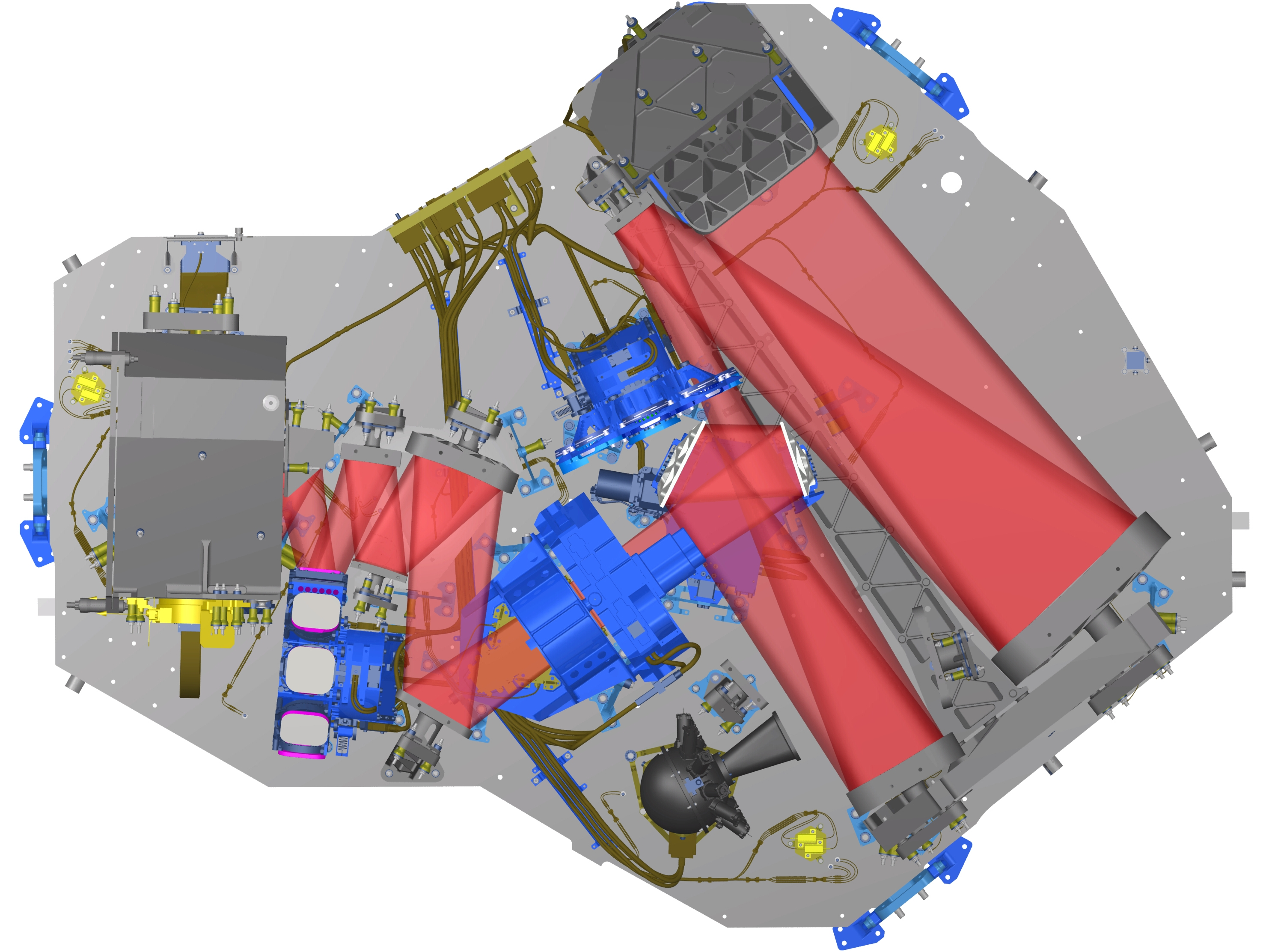
NIRSpec and the optical path

== See also ==
- Fine Guidance Sensor and Near Infrared Imager and Slitless Spectrograph
- Mid-Infrared Instrument (James Webb Space Telescope's 5–28 micron camera/spectrograph)
- NIRCam (NIR camera for JWST up to 5 micron wavelength light)
- Integrated Science Instrument Module (ISIM, houses NIRSpec and the other JWST instruments)
