= Lyman-break galaxy =

Star-forming galaxies at high redshift

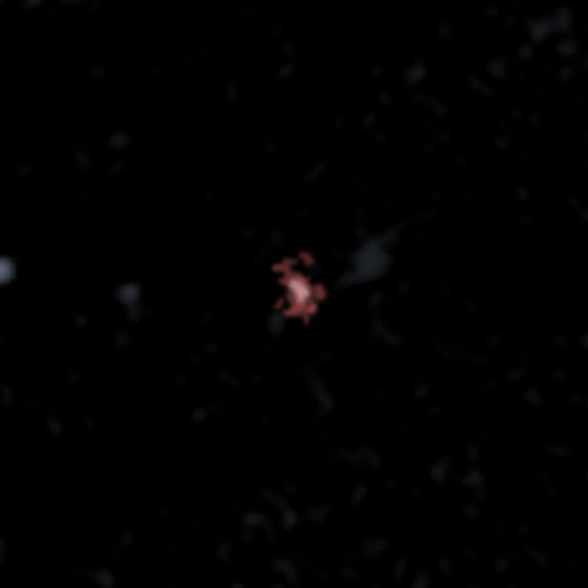
UNCOVER-z13, an extremely distant Lyman-Break galaxy

Lyman-break galaxies are star-forming galaxies at high redshift that are selected using the differing appearance of the galaxy in several imaging filters due to the position of the Lyman limit. The technique has primarily been used to select galaxies at redshifts of z = 3–4 using ultraviolet and optical filters, but progress in ultraviolet astronomy and in infrared astronomy has allowed the use of this technique at lower and higher redshifts using ultraviolet and near-infrared filters.

== Discovery and characteristics ==
The Lyman-break galaxy selection technique relies upon the fact that radiation at higher energies than the Lyman limit at 912 Å is almost completely absorbed by neutral gas around star-forming regions of galaxies. In the rest frame of the emitting galaxy, the emitted spectrum is bright at wavelengths longer than 912 Å, but very dim or imperceptible at shorter wavelengths. This is known as a "dropout", or "break", and can be used to find the position of the Lyman limit. Light with a wavelength shorter than 912 Å is in the far-ultraviolet range, and is blocked by Earth's atmosphere, but for very distant galaxies, the wavelengths of light are stretched considerably because of the expansion of the universe. For a galaxy at redshift z = 3, the Lyman break will appear to be at wavelengths of about 3600 Å, which is long enough to be detected by ground- or space-based telescopes.

Candidate galaxies around redshift z = 3 can then be selected by looking for galaxies which appear in optical images (which are sensitive to wavelengths greater than 3600 Å), but do not appear in ultraviolet images (which are sensitive to light at wavelengths shorter than 3600 Å). The technique may be adapted to look for galaxies at other redshifts by choosing different sets of filters; the method works as long as images may be taken through at least one filter above and below the wavelength of the redshifted Lyman limit. In order to confirm the redshift estimated by the color selection, follow-up spectroscopy is performed. Although spectroscopic measurements are necessary to obtain a high-precision redshift, spectroscopy is typically much more time-consuming than imaging, so the selection of candidate galaxies via the Lyman-break technique greatly improves the efficiency of high-redshift galaxy surveys.

The issue of their far-infrared emission is still central to the study of Lyman-break galaxies to better understand their evolution and to estimate their total star-formation rate. So far, only a small sample has been detected in far-infrared. Most of the individual results rely upon information that is gathered from lensed Lyman-break galaxies or from the rest-frame ultraviolet, or from a few objects detected by the Herschel Space Observatory or using the stacking technique that allows researchers to obtain average values for individually undetected Lyman-break galaxies.

But, recently, the stacking techniques on about 22000 galaxies allowed, for the first time, to collect some statistical information on the dust properties of LBGs.

In February 2022, astronomers reported the discovery of two Lyman break galaxies, named HD1 and HD2, at z ~ 12–13, based upon studies that used the Lyman technique. Also note GLASS-z12, a distant galaxy that was discovered by the James Webb Space Telescope in July 2022, and JADES-GS-z14-0, a Lyman-break galaxy at z ~ 14.32, which was also found by the JWST.

== See also ==
- Balmer break – Difference of intensity of the stellar continuum spectrum
- BzK galaxy
- Damped Lyman-alpha system – Concentrations of neutral hydrogen gas
- Lyman-alpha blob – Astronomical object type
- Lyman-alpha emitter – Type of distant galaxy
- Lyman-alpha forest – Astronomical spectroscopic term
- Lyman series – Set of ultraviolet wavelengths emitted by hydrogen
