= List of largest nebulae =

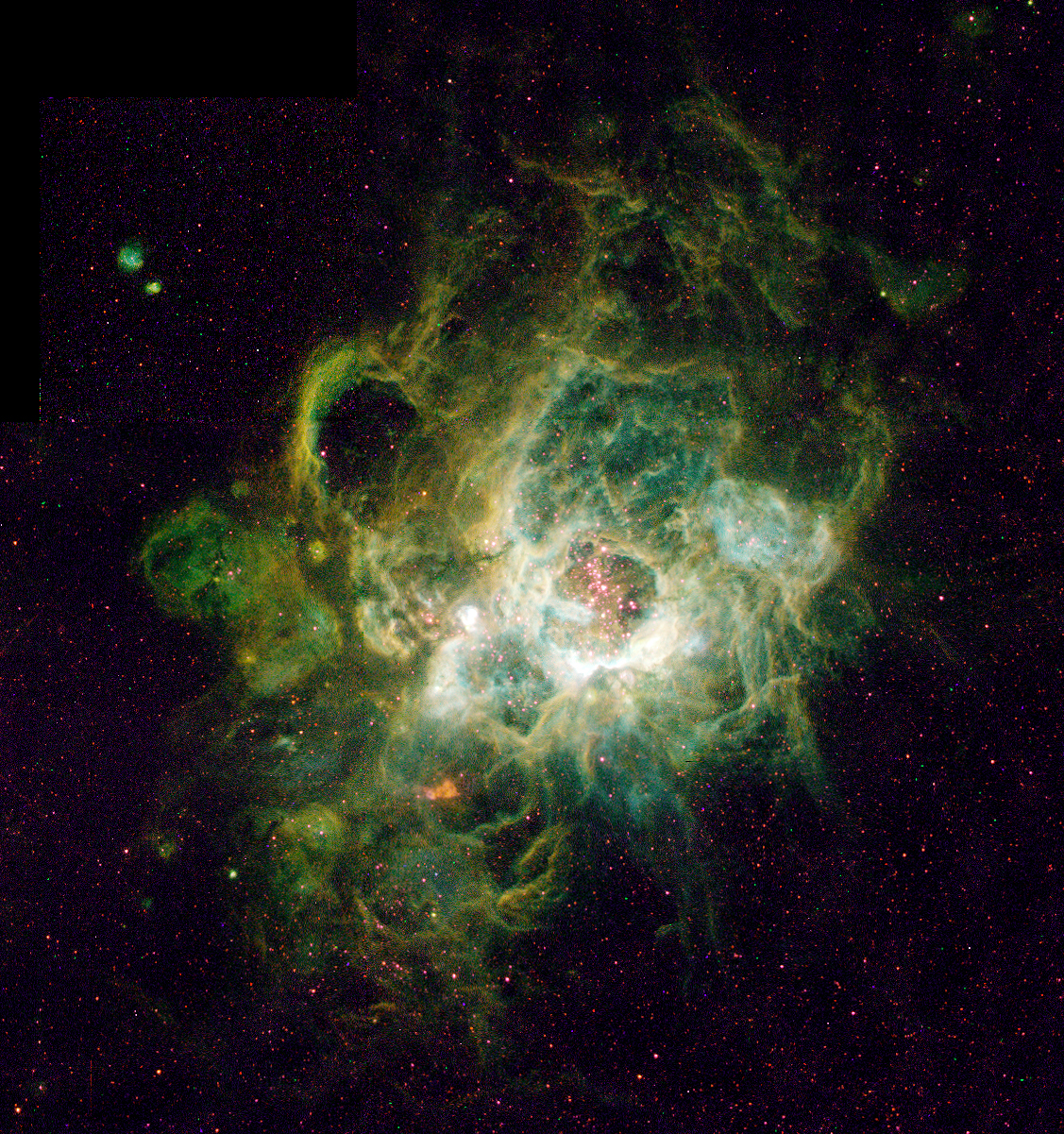
NGC 604, one of largest nebulae (H II region) is located in the Triangulum Galaxy (viewed by the Hubble Space Telescope).

Below is a list of the largest known nebulae so far discovered, ordered by actual diameter. This list is prone to change because of inconsistencies between studies, the great distances of nebulae from our stellar neighborhood, and the constant refinement of technology and engineering.

== Caveats ==
Nebulae have no standardized boundaries, so the measurements are subject to revision. Furthermore, scientists are still defining the features and parameters of nebulae. Because of these rapid developments and adjustments, this list may be unreliable.

Lyman alpha nebulae around quasars can have sizes between 15 kpc and 460 kpc. Especially large Enormous Lyα nebula (ELAN) can have large sizes of ≳100 kpc. Farina et al. 2019 table 5 has an extensive compilation of Lyman alpha nebulae around quasars. For now this list contains only the largest ELANs, with sizes larger than 300 kpc.

== List ==
List of the largest nebulae
Image	Nebula	Maximum dimension (in light-years/parsecs)	Type	Notes
	Abell 3391/3395 ICM	49,000,000 ly (15,000,000 pc)	Intracluster medium (ICM)	Continuous warm-hot emission filament between two galaxy clusters.
	Abell 1659S ICM	2,413,000 ly (740,000 pc)	Intracluster medium (ICM)	One of the gas clumps of the Abell 1659 galaxy cluster.
	Abell 1659N ICM	1,618,000 ly (496,000 pc)	Intracluster medium (ICM)	One of the gas clumps of the Abell 1659 galaxy cluster.
	Slug Nebula	1,500,000 ly (460,000 pc)	Enormous Lyα nebula (ELAN)	Around the quasar UM287 at around z=2.3. Cosmic filament illuminated by the quasar.
	MAMMOTH-1	1,441,000 ly (442,000 pc)	Enormous Lyα nebula (ELAN)	The nebula is associated with the galaxy overdensity BOSS1441, which is a protocluster at z=2.3. The nebula represents the circumgalactic medium. Its emission is powered by starburst and an obscured AGN. One of the most extended ELAN discovered as of 2019.
	NGC 262 Halo Cloud	1,300,000 ly (400,000 pc)	H I region	Spiral nebula surrounding NGC 262, which is one of the largest known galaxies.
	Ivory Nebula	1,190,500 ly (365,000 pc)	Enormous Lyα nebula (ELAN)	Also called MLAN1 at z=2.31. Another ELAN, called MLAN 10 is nearby.
	Q0042−2627 nebula	1,040,000 ly (320,000 pc)	Enormous Lyα nebula (ELAN)	Around the quasar LBQS 0042-2627, at z=3.280
	Jackpot Nebula	1,010,000 ly (310,000 pc)	Enormous Lyα nebula (ELAN)	Four quasars embedded in the nebula. Likely progenitor of a massive galaxy cluster at z=2.05.
	Fabulous Nebula	969,000 ly (297,000 pc)	Enormous Lyα nebula (ELAN)	Also called SDSS J1020+1040 nebula, after the central quasar (aka 4C 10.29), located at z=3.164. Inspiraling material. Will likely evolve into an elliptical galaxy.
	Leo Ring	650,000 ly (200,000 pc)	HVC	A large ring of cold gas that formed from a collision of two galaxies.
	Magellanic Stream	600,000 ly (180,000 pc)	complex of HVCs	Connects the Large and Small Magellanic clouds; extends across 180° of the sky.
	filament near TXS 0206-048	391,000 ly (120,000 pc)	[O II] nebula	Longest cool filament near a quasar as of 2022. Quasar is located at z=1.13. Filament is accreted into the galaxy and subsequently to the quasar.
	EELR of 3C 458	363,000 ly (111,000 pc)	emission line nebula	The size is likely larger. The paper only describes the maximal distance to the nucleus and not the entire size.
	nebula around the Teacup galaxy	363,000 ly (111,000 pc)	ionized nebula	part of the circumgalactic medium around the Teacup galaxy, illuminated by the AGN
	TON 618's lyman-alpha blob	330,000 ly (100,000 pc)	LαB	Surrounds the quasar TON 618.
	Lyman-alpha blob 1	300,000 ly (92,000 pc)	LαB	Largest blob in the LAB Giant Concentration
	Himiko Gas Cloud	55,000 ly (17,000 pc)	Intergalactic cloud (possible LαB)	One of the most massive lyman-alpha blobs known
	HVC 127-41-330	20,000 ly (6,100 pc)	HVC	
	Smith's Cloud	9,800 ly (3,000 pc)	HVC	Extends about 20° of the sky
	Tarantula Nebula	1,895 ly (581 pc) (Note: distance × sin( diameter_angle ) = 1,895 ly)	H II region	Most active starburst region in the Local Group
	NGC 604	1,520 ly (470 pc) (Note: distance × sin( diameter_angle ) = 1,520 ly)	H II region	Largest H II region located in the Triangulum Galaxy
	N44	1,000 ly (310 pc)	Emission nebula	Contains a 250 light year wide superbubble that was probably formed from stellar winds.
	N11	1,000 ly (310 pc)	H II region	N11 is the second largest star formation region in the Large Magellanic Cloud galaxy.
	NGC 2404	940 ly (290 pc)	H II region	Largest H II region located in the spiral galaxy NGC 2403
	NGC 595	880 ly (270 pc)	H II region	Contains massive stars that have strong stellar winds.
	Ring Nebula (NGC 6822)	838 ly (257 pc)	H II region	The Ring Nebula is located in the lower right of the image
	Gum Nebula	809–950 ly (248–291 pc)	Emission nebula	Extends about 36° of the sky
	Bubble Nebula (NGC 6822)	758 ly (232 pc)	H II region	The Bubble Nebula is located in the upper left of the image
	NGC 6188	600 ly (180 pc)	Emission nebula	
	NGC 592	580 ly (180 pc)	H II region	Located in the Triangulum Galaxy
	Cygnus X	560 ly (170 pc)	radio and infrared emission nebula	Cygnus X is relative nearby, but hidden behind dark clouds, dimensions on the sky are 7° x 7° and distance is 1400 pc
	Sh2-310	531–681 ly (163–209 pc) (Note: Those measurements are based on an apparent diameter of 480 arcminutes (') plus an assumed distance of 1.5 kpc and the current distance of VY CMa which is about 1.17 kpc as the nebula is sometimes found to have the same distance as VY CMa.)	H II region	Nebula surrounding VY Canis Majoris, which is one of largest known stars.
	Carina Nebula	460 ly (140 pc)	H II region	Nearest giant H II region to Earth
	Dragonfish Nebula	450 ly (140 pc)	Emission nebula	
	N119	430–570 ly (131–175 pc)	H II region	Peculiar S-shape
	RCW 49	350 ly (110 pc)	H II region	
	Soul Nebula	330 ly (100 pc)	H II region	
	Heart Nebula	330 ly (100 pc)	H II region	Has been named the “Heart nebula” because of its resemblance to a human heart.
	Henize 70 (N70 or DEM L301)	300 ly (92 pc)	H II region	The N 70 Nebula, in the Large Magellanic Cloud has a shell structure and is really a bubble in space. It is a "Super Bubble".
	Barnard's Loop	300 ly (92 pc)	H II region	Supernova over the last 4 million years probably carved cavities in gas clouds forming the semi circle shape of Barnard's loop.
	Sh2-54	252 ly (77 pc)	H II region	
	Prawn Nebula	250 ly (77 pc)	H II region	
	Simeis 147	160 ly (49 pc)	Supernova remnant	
	NGC 7822	150 ly (46 pc)	Emission nebula	
	IC 2944	142 ly (44 pc)	Emission nebula	
	Eagle Nebula	140 ly (43 pc)	H II region	Part of another diffuse nebula IC 4703.
	Rosette Nebula	130 ly (40 pc)	H II region	Only 36 stars were known to be in this nebula but the Chandra telescope increased the number of known stars to 160.
	Lagoon Nebula	110 ly (34 pc)	H II region	
	Veil Nebula	100–130 ly (31–40 pc)	Supernova remnant	Located in the Cygnus Loop
	NGC 3576	100 ly (31 pc)	Emission nebula	
	N41	100 ly (31 pc)	Emission nebula	
	The following well-known nebulae are listed for the purpose of comparison.			
	Orion Nebula	20 ly (6.132 pc)	Diffuse Nebula	The closest major star formation region to Earth.
	Crab Nebula	11 ly (3.4 pc)	Supernova remnant	The remnant of a supernova that occurred in 1054 AD.
	Bubble Nebula	6-10 ly (1.84-3.066 pc)	Emission nebula	
	Helix Nebula	5.74 ly (1.76 pc)	Emission nebula	
	Eightburst Nebula	0.8 ly (0.2453 pc)	Emission nebula	
	Homunculus Nebula	0.58 ly (0.1778 pc)	Emission nebula	Surrounds the star system Eta Carinae.
	Stingray Nebula	0.16 ly (0.049 pc)	Emission nebula	One of the smallest nebulae.

== See also ==
- List of largest cosmic structures
- List of largest known stars
- List of largest planets
- List of most massive stars
- List of most massive black holes
- List of largest galaxies

== Sources ==
- Cannon, John M.; Walter, Fabian; Armus, Lee; Bendo, George J.; Calzetti, Daniela; Draine, Bruce T.; Engelbracht, Charles W.; Helou, George; et al. (December 2006), "The Nature of Infrared Emission in the Local Group Dwarf Galaxy NGC 6822 as Revealed by Spitzer", The Astrophysical Journal, vol. 652, no. 2, pp. 1170–1187, arXiv:astro-ph/0608249, Bibcode:2006ApJ...652.1170C, doi:10.1086/508341, S2CID 10287455
- HubbleSite (2000). "An Expanding Bubble in Space".
- Karachentsev, I. D.; Karachentseva, V. E.; Hutchmeier, W. K.; Makarov, D. I. (April 2004), "A Catalog of Neighboring Galaxies", Astronomical Journal, vol. 127, no. 4, pp. 2031–2068, Bibcode:2004AJ....127.2031K, doi:10.1086/382905
- Karachentsev, I. D.; Kashibadze, O. G. (January 2006), "Masses of the local group and of the M81 group estimated from distortions in the local velocity field", Astrophysics, vol. 49, no. 1, pp. 3–18, Bibcode:2006Ap.....49....3K, doi:10.1007/s10511-006-0002-6, S2CID 120973010
- Nemiroff, R.; Bonnell, J., eds. (November 7, 2005). "NGC 7635: The Bubble Nebula". Astronomy Picture of the Day. NASA.
- Nemiroff, R.; Bonnell, J., eds. (October 18, 2006). "NGC 7635: The Bubble". Astronomy Picture of the Day. NASA.
