= Newfound Blob =

Newfound Blob may refer to:

- Lyman-alpha blob 1 (LAB-1), one of the first discovered Lyman-alpha blobs
- Himiko (Lyman-alpha blob)
- EQ J221734.0+001701, the SSA22 Protocluster
- a gas cloud orbiting Sagittarius A*
- the magma plume causing the African superswell
