= TON 618 =

Quasar

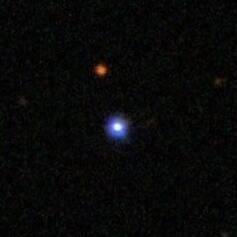
- TON 618, imaged by the Sloan Digital Sky Survey Data Release 9 (DR9). The quasar appears as the bright, bluish-white dot at the center.

Observation data (Epoch J2000.0)
- Constellation: Canes Venatici and Coma Berenices
- Right ascension: 12^{h} 28^{m} 24.9^{s}
- Declination: +31° 28′ 38″
- Redshift: 2.219
- Distance: 3.31 Gpc (10.8 Gly) (light travel distance); 5.59 Gpc (18.2 Gly) (comoving distance, present proper distance)
- Type: Quasar
- Apparent magnitude (V): 15.9
- Notable features: Hyperluminous quasar in a Lyman-alpha blob

Other designations
- Gaia DR1 4015522739308729728, FBQS J122824.9+312837, B2 1225+31, QSO 1228+3128, 7C 1225+3145, CSO 140, 2E 2728

TON 618 (abbreviation of Tonantzintla 618) is a hyperluminous, broad-emission-line, radio-loud quasar, and Lyman-alpha blob located near the border of the constellations Canes Venatici and Coma Berenices, with the projected comoving distance of approximately 5.59 gigaparsecs (18.2 billion light-years) from Earth. (Note: This distance may seem to contradict the age of the Universe and is greater than the oldest light of the most distant objects. However, the time difference corresponds to another quantity, light-travel distance, which is only 10.8 billion light-years. See Distance measures (cosmology), which explains the distance measures used in cosmology.) It contains one of the most massive black holes ever found, with its mass variously reported as 40.7 billion times the Sun's mass (M_{☉}) or 66 billion M_{☉}.

== Observational history ==
As quasars were not recognized until 1963, the nature of this object was unknown when it was first noted in a 1957 survey of faint blue stars (mainly white dwarfs) that lie away from the plane of the Milky Way. On photographic plates taken with the 0.7 m (27 1/2 in) Schmidt telescope at the Tonantzintla Observatory in Mexico, it appeared as a "decidedly violet" or faint blue star and was listed by the Mexican astronomers Braulio Iriarte and Enrique Chavira as entry number 618 in the Tonantzintla Catalogue.

Thirteen years later, in 1970, a radio survey at Bologna in Italy discovered radio emissions from TON 618, indicating that it was a quasar. Marie-Helene Ulrich then obtained optical spectra of TON 618 at the McDonald Observatory which showed emission lines typical of a quasar. From the high redshift of the lines, Ulrich deduced that TON 618 was very distant, and hence was one of the most luminous quasars known.

== Components ==
=== Supermassive black hole ===
Size comparison of the event horizons of the black holes of TON 618 and Phoenix A. The orbit of Neptune (white oval) is included for comparison.

As a quasar, TON 618 is believed to be the active galactic nucleus at the center of a galaxy, the engine of which is a supermassive black hole feeding on intensely hot gas and matter in an accretion disc. Given its observed redshift of 2.219, the light travel time of TON 618 is estimated to be approximately 10.8 billion years, which is directly proportional to its distance in light-years. Due to the brilliance of the central quasar, the surrounding galaxy is outshone by it and hence is not visible from Earth. With an absolute magnitude of −30.7, it shines with a luminosity of 4×10^{40} watts, or as brilliantly as 140 trillion times that of our Sun (L_{☉}), making it one of the brightest objects in the known universe.

Like other quasars, TON 618 has a spectrum containing emission lines from cooler gas much further out than the accretion disc, in the broad-line region. The size of the broad-line region can be calculated from the brightness of the quasar radiation that is lighting it up. Shemmer and coauthors used both N_{V} and C_{IV} emission lines in order to calculate the widths of the H_{β} spectral line of at least 29 quasars, including TON 618, as a direct measurement of their accretion rates and hence the mass of the central black hole.

The emission lines in the spectrum of TON 618 have been found to be unusually wider than most, indicating that the gas is travelling very fast; the full width half maxima of TON 618 has been the largest of the 29 quasars, with hints of 10,500 km/s speeds of infalling material by a direct measure of the H_{β} spectral line, indication of a very strong gravitational force. From this, the mass of the central black hole of TON 618 has been estimated to be at 66 billion M_{☉}. This is considered one of the highest masses ever recorded for such an object; higher than the mass of all the stars in the Milky Way galaxy combined, which is 64 billion M_{☉}, and 15,300 times more massive than Sagittarius A*, the Milky Way's central black hole. With such high mass, TON 618 may fall into a proposed new classification of ultramassive black holes. A black hole of this mass has a Schwarzschild radius of 1,300 astronomical units (194 billion kilometres; 0.0206 light-years) or 283,000 solar radii (R_{☉}), which is more than 60 times the distance from Pluto to the Sun.

A more recent measurement in 2019 by Xue Ge et al. which utilizes the C IV emission line, an alternative spectral line to H_{β}—using the same data reproduced by the earlier paper by Shemmer—found a lower relative velocity of the surrounding gas of 2,761±423 km/s, which indicates a lower mass for the central black hole at 40.7 billion M_{☉}, consequentially lower than the previous estimate. Due to the Schwarzschild radius growing proportionately to a black hole's mass, this would correspond to an event horizon spanning 800 astronomical units (120 billion kilometres; 0.0127 light-years), about 40 times the distance from Pluto to the Sun.

Evolution models based on the revisited mass of TON 618's supermassive black hole predict that it will live for roughly 1.3×10^{99} years (near the end of the Black Hole Era of the universe, when it is nearly 10^{89} times its current age), before it dissipates via Hawking radiation.

=== Lyman-alpha nebula ===
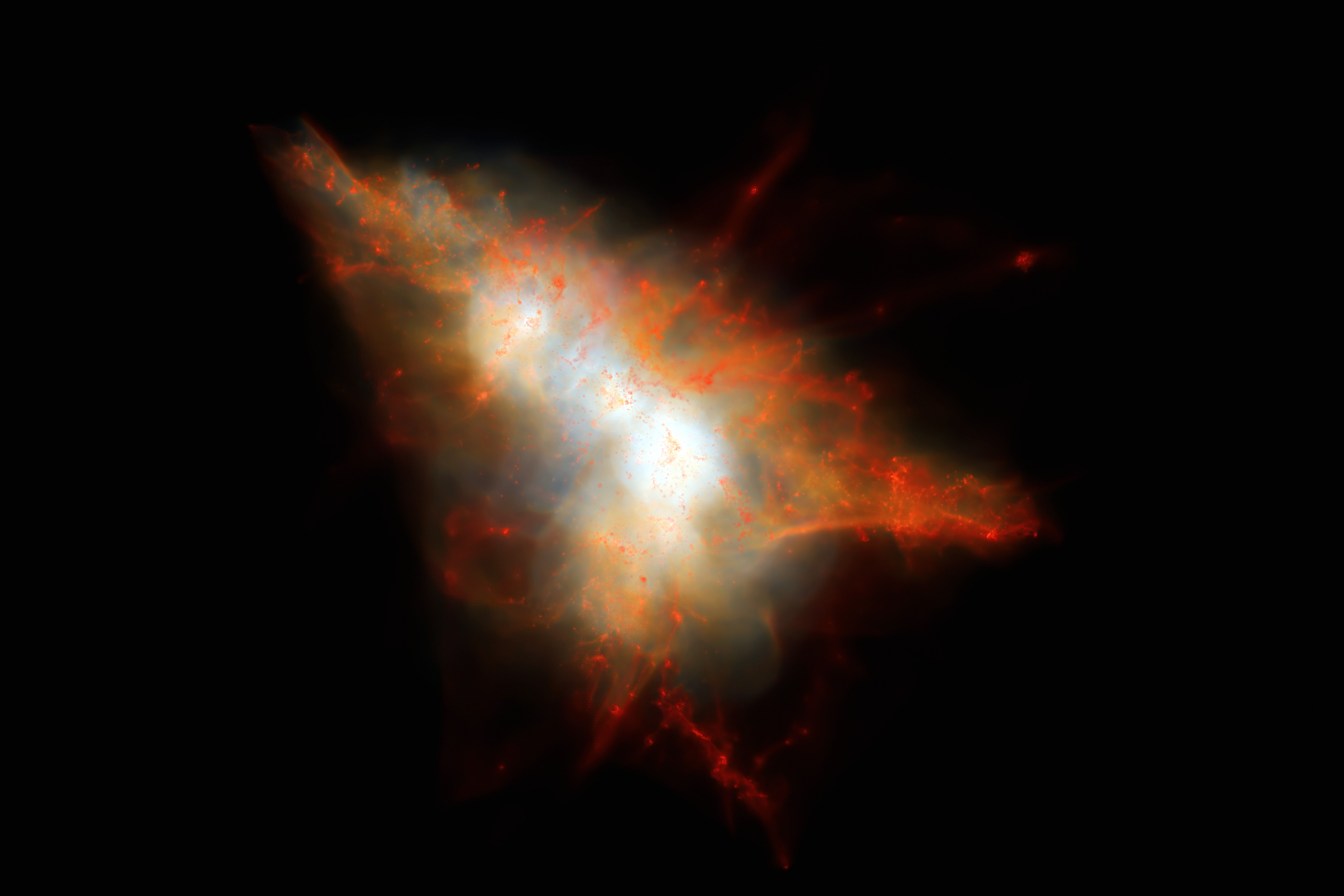
A computer simulated close-up view of a Lyman-alpha blob. A similar gas cloud is present at TON 618.

The nature of TON 618 as a Lyman-alpha emitter has been well documented since at least the 1980s. Lyman-alpha emitters are characterized by their significant emission of the Lyman-alpha line, an ultraviolet wavelength emitted by neutral hydrogen. Such objects, however, have been very difficult to study due to the Lyman-alpha line being strongly absorbed by air in the Earth's atmosphere, limiting study of Lyman-alpha emitters to those objects with high redshifts. TON 618, with its luminous emission of Lyman-alpha radiation along with its high redshift, has made it one of the most important objects in the study of the Lyman-alpha forest.

Observations made by the Atacama Large Millimeter Array (ALMA) in 2021 revealed the apparent source of the Lyman-alpha radiation of TON 618: an enormous cloud of gas surrounding the quasar and its host galaxy. This would make it a Lyman-alpha blob (LAB), one of the largest such objects yet known.

LABs are huge collections of gases, or nebulae, that are also classified as Lyman-alpha emitters. These enormous, galaxy-sized clouds are some of the largest nebulae known to exist, with some identified LABs in the 2000s reaching sizes of at least hundreds of thousands of light-years across.

In the case of TON 618, the enormous Lyman-alpha nebula surrounding it has the diameter of at least 100 kiloparsecs (330,000 light-years), triple the size of the Milky Way. The nebula consists of two parts: an inner molecular outflow and an extensive cold molecular gas in its circumgalactic medium, each having the mass of 50 billion M_{☉}, with both of them being aligned to the radio jet produced by the central quasar. The extreme radiation from TON 618 excites the hydrogen in the nebula so much that it causes it to glow brightly in the Lyman-alpha line, consistent with the observations of other LABs driven by their inner galaxies. Since both quasars and LABs are precursors of modern-day galaxies, the observation on TON 618 and its enormous LAB gave insight to the processes that drive the evolution of massive galaxies, in particular probing their ionization and early development.

== See also ==
=== Other notable objects in the Tonantzintla Catalogue ===
- RZ Leonis Minoris – cataclysmic variable listed as TON 1107.
- SX Leonis Minoris – variable star listed as TON 45.
- U Geminorum – star system listed as TON 842.
