= QSO J0305−3150 =

Quasar in the constellation of Fornax

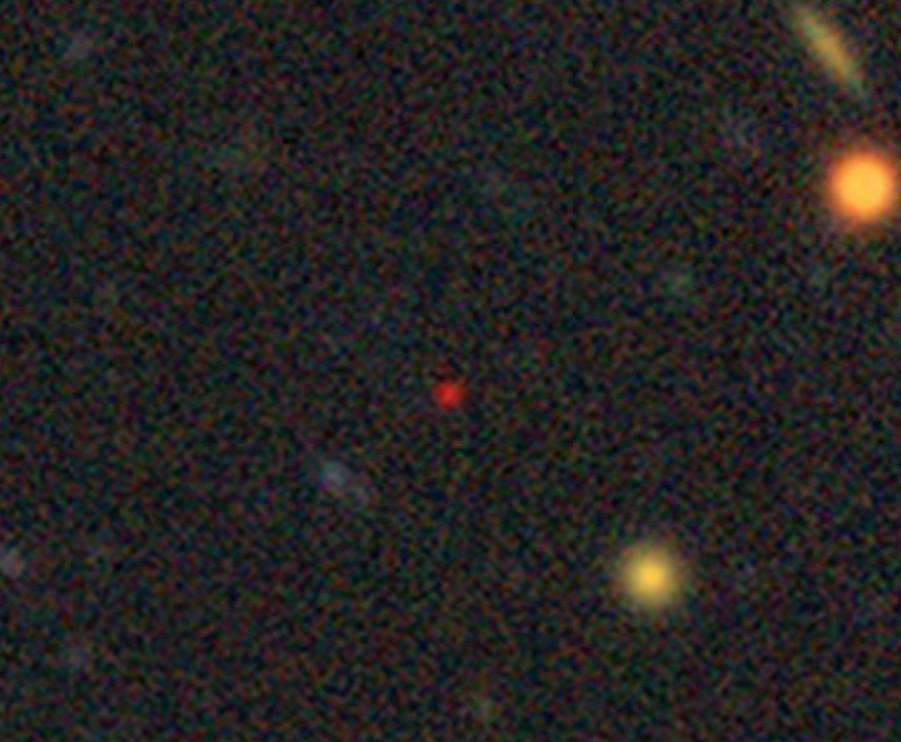
- QSO J0305−3150 imaged by DESI Legacy Survey

Observation data (J2000.0 epoch)
- Constellation: Fornax
- Right ascension: 03^{h} 05^{m} 16.92^{s}
- Declination: −31° 50′ 55.92″
- Redshift: 6.614500
- Distance: 12.8 billion ly (light-travel time distance)

Characteristics
- Type: QSO

Other designations
- VIKING J030516.92−315056.0

QSO J0305−3150 or J0305−3150, is an extremely distant luminous quasar located in the constellation of Fornax. It was first discovered by the VISTA Kilo-degree Infrared Galaxy survey (VIKING) in November 2013 and has a redshift of (z) 6.61, corresponding to a light travel time of 12.8 billion light-years.

== Description ==
QSO J0305−3150 is a quasar with an absolute magnitude of M_{1450} = -25.96 ± 0.06, but it is found fainter than ULAS J1120+0641. Its estimated integrated line flux is 3.44 ± 0.15 Jy km s^{−1} making it the highest known amongst two other studied quasars, J0109−3047 and J2348−3054. When compared with another high redshift quasar SDSS J114816.64+525150.3, its emission line luminosity is found similar making the object amongst the brightest [C II] emitters. A Lyman-alpha emission nebula is seen surrounding the quasar, being displaced and redshifted, with an extension of 9 kiloparsecs.

The host of QSO J0305−3150 is described as massive ultraluminous inflared galaxy with a luminosity of 4.0-7.5 × 10^{12} L_{☉} and a star formation of 1500 M_{☉} per year. In the center like most other galaxies, lies a supermassive black hole with an estimated mass of 1 × 10^{9} M_{☉}. Evidence showed the black hole is accreting given the presence of complex interstellar gas located within 3 kiloparsecs with high velocity dispersion. A molecular gas reservoir has been found in the host galaxy with a measured stellar mass of less than 2.1 × 10^{10} M_{☉} and a mass surface density of (2.0 ± 0.9) × 10^{4} pc^{−2}.

Observations made by Atacama Large Millimeter Array in February 2025, has found the quasar is undergoing a merger with a nearby companion galaxy described as an Lyman-alpha emitter (LAE). When observed, it is found to display a compact dust continuum emission with most recovered within 1.6 kiloparsecs and a singly ionized carbon [C II] emission profile mainly made of a central Gaussian and an extended component. Results have also shown the emission is on large-scale with an aligned velocity gradient towards the galaxy, perturbed and misaligned with small-scale emission. As there is lack of [C II] emission in physical structures of 1 kiloparsec, it is not produced in dense photodissociation regions but inside low-density regions of both diffused H I gas and interstellar medium produced from tidal stripping during the merger process.

A filamentary structure has been discovered surrounding QSO J0305−3150 by James Webb Space Telescope (JWST). Based on observations, the structure is found to have a galaxy overdensity, making the structure most overdense when found in the early universe. The environment where the quasar is residing is complex with a diverse population of galaxies, among them dusty forming and ultraviolet-bright galaxies.
