= IC 4997 =

Planetary nebula in the constellation Sagitta

Emission nebula
- Planetary nebula
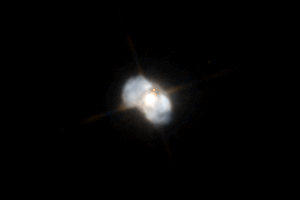

Observation data: J2000 epoch
- Right ascension: 20^{h} 20^{m} 08.76^{s}
- Declination: +16° 43′ 53.7″
- Distance: 14,090 (4,320 pc) ly
- Apparent magnitude (V): 11.15
- Apparent dimensions (V): 2.7″ x 1.4″
- Constellation: Sagitta

Physical characteristics
- Radius: 0.092 ly
- Notable features: Bipolar outflow, Bipolar nebula
- Designations: IC 4997 PNG 058.3-10.9; PK 058-10 1 Hen 2-464; PN ARO 38 V* QV Sge

IC 4997 is a planetary nebula located in the constellation of Sagitta. It was discovered in 1896 by Edward Charles Pickering and Williamina Fleming, and independently by Gustav Gruss the same year. This nebula is about 14,000 light-years from Earth. It looks like an ordinary star in smaller telescopes, and only detailed study of its spectrum reveals its nebular characteristics.

== Physical characteristics ==
IC 4997 is very young and very dense with a very high nebular temperature of around 20,000 K, which is twice those measured in most nebulae. The mean expansion velocity of the nebula seems to be slow at 20 km/s at the outer layer, while it also reaches a maximum expansion velocity of 60 km/s relative to its central star. Its central star has a magnitude of around 14m and a temperature of around 47,000--59 000 K.

The most characteristic feature of IC 4997 is its variability. In the 1960s, there was a sudden change in its spectrum. Variability could be related to the nebula expansion or an episodic smoothly changing stellar wind.

== See also ==
- List of planetary nebulae
- List of largest nebulae
- Lists of nebulae
