= Damped Lyman-alpha system =

Concentrations of neutral hydrogen gas

Damped Lyman alpha systems or Damped Lyman alpha absorption systems is a term used by astronomers for concentrations of neutral hydrogen gas that are detected in the spectra of quasars – a class of distant active galactic nuclei. They are defined to be systems where the column density (density projected along the line of sight to the quasar) of hydrogen is larger than 2×10^{20} atoms/cm^{2}.

The observed spectra consist of neutral hydrogen Lyman alpha absorption lines which are broadened by radiation damping. These systems can be observed in quantity at relatively high redshifts of 2–4, when they contained most of the neutral hydrogen in the universe. They are believed to be associated with the early stages of galaxy formation, as the high neutral hydrogen column densities of DLAs are also typical of sightlines in the Milky Way, and other nearby galaxies. Since they are observed in absorption rather than emissions by their stars, they offer the opportunity to study the dynamics of the gas in early galaxies directly.

== See also ==
- Lyman-alpha blob
- Lyman-alpha emitter
- Lyman-alpha forest
- Lyman-break galaxy
