= 4C 25.21 =

Quasar located in the constellation Gemini

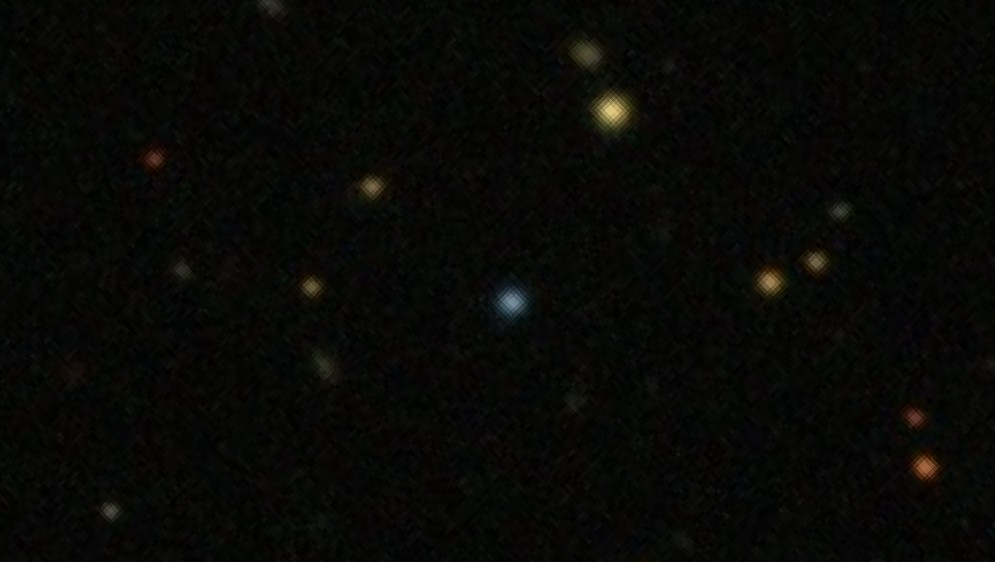
- The quasar 4C 25.21.

Observation data (J2000.0 epoch)
- Constellation: Gemini
- Right ascension: 07^{h} 33^{m} 08.7792^{s}
- Declination: +25° 36′ 24.973″
- Redshift: 2.689711
- Heliocentric radial velocity: 806,355 km/s
- Distance: 10.894 Gly
- Apparent magnitude (V): 19.26
- Apparent magnitude (B): 19.60

Characteristics
- Type: RLQ

Other designations
- B2 0730+25A, [HB89] 0730+257, LEDA 2819888, PKS B0730+257, OI +250, Cul 0730+257, 2CXO J073308.7+253624

4C 25.21 is a radio-loud quasar located in the northern constellation of Gemini. It has a high redshift of (z) 2.689 and it was first discovered as an astronomical radio source in August 1967, where it was subsequently identified with a bright object found close to its radio position three years later. This object has also been classified as having a Fanaroff-Riley Type II morphology, but is also categorized as a weak-headed quasar (WHQ) with a jet and faint traces of hotspots.

== Description ==
The radio structure of 4C 25.21 is described as a single elongated compact component based on observations using the Cambridge 5-km Telescope, by both J.M. Riley and G.G. Pooley. It has a weak radio core, clearly resolved with Very Long Baseline Interferometry observations. The core contains a steep radio spectrum based on a 2 centimeter radio mapping. A flux density of 17 S_{c} was also found for the core, when observed at 5 GHz frequencies.

4C 25.21 contains a powerful jet found to be one-sided, with a flux measuring 126 S_{j}. This jet has an extension of 8.06 kiloparsecs. An X-ray jet counterpart was also found, based on evidence of an additional structure from the quasar. X-ray emission is present along its direction between its hotspot and inner jet, likely caused by inverse Compton scattering from the cosmic microwave background. Further evidence finds the emission was also found in the upstream direction of a faint radio peak, suggesting the absence of radio emission in these X-ray jets.

Lyman-alpha emission was detected towards northwest of the quasar, mainly dominating the area. Continuum emission extends asymmetrically in both the southeast and south as well, based on optical deep imaging. Radio emission was also detected by the Very Large Array with its 4 GHz peak flux reaching 338.28 mJy in 1999.
