= TXS 0211−122 =

Radio galaxy in the constellation of Cetus

Observation data (J2000.0 epoch)
- Constellation: Cetus
- Right ascension: 02^{h} 14^{m} 17.44^{s}
- Declination: −11° 58′ 47.70″
- Redshift: 2.338800
- Heliocentric radial velocity: 701,155 km/s
- Distance: 10.512 Gly

Characteristics
- Type: Radio galaxy

Other designations
- LEDA 2823016

TXS 0211−122 is a high redshift radio galaxy located in the constellation of Cetus. The redshift of the object is (z) 2.338 and it was first discovered by R. van Ojik and other astronomers in September 1994, who found the object has an ultra steep radio spectrum.

== Description ==
The host galaxy of TXS 0211−122 is found to be extremely massive, containing a bright central nucleus with a much smaller clump feature, based on imaging made by Hubble Space Telescope (HST). It is also shown to be a starburst galaxy undergoing an immense wave of star formation in its central region. The total molecular hydrogen amount of the galaxy is 10^{11} M_{☉} and it has a stellar mass of around 1.45 × 10^{11} M_{☉}.

The radio source is classified as a double with a Fanaroff-Riley Class Type II morphology. The flux density of the source has been estimated to be 189 mJy at 1465 MHz. A weak radio core is found between the radio lobes of the source. A curved and bent radio jet has also been discovered, extending outwards from the core towards the eastern lobe. This has been suggested to interact with the interstellar medium.

A study showed the jet is driving the outflows from the galaxy. The narrow component contains interstellar gas that is both extended and elongated along the radio axis position from the south-east to north-west. On the eastern side of the nucleus, the line widths are different, with a full-width at half maximum of 300 kilometers per seconds which is more compared to the western side. The galaxy is also surrounded by a large Lyman-alpha emission nebula with polarization which increases east from the nucleus to 16.4 ± 4.6%. A shell structure is found associated with the nebula, interpreted as a product of supernovae depositing energy into the interstellar medium, thus creating expanding gas bubbles.
