= VIK J2348-3054 =

Star formation suppressing quasar

- Artistic impression of a supermassive black hole powering a quasar

Observation data (Epoch J2000)
- Constellation: Sculptor
- Right ascension: 23^{h} 48^{m} 33.34^{s}
- Declination: −30° 54′ 10.0″
- Redshift: 6.9018
- Type: Luminous Quasar
- Notable features: Suppresses star formation in galaxies within 5 mpc

VIK J2348-3054 is a high-redshift luminous quasar in the epoch of reionization located at a redshift distance of z=6.9018. Despite it being located in a region where there should be an overdensity of Lyman-alpha emitter (LAEs) galaxies for several mpc, there is a lack of LAEs for at least 5.15 mpc. In fact, the nearest galaxy capable of forming new stars was located some 16.8 million light years away from this galaxy. This means that VIK J2348-3054 is most likely suppressing star formation in the galaxies in its immediate vicinity. This lack of LAE galaxies is unusual for luminous quasars like VIK J2348-3054 because high-red shift quasars are usually found in dense regions of space.

The quasar suppresses star formation in those surrounding galaxies by illuminating and heating up the gas in those galaxies with intense radiation. In order for stars to from, they need cold gas clouds to collapse under their own gravity. The central supermassive black hole (SMBH) powering the quasar has a mass of 2 billion solar masses, meaning that it has accumulated a substantial amount of material in a relatively short amount of time period, in about 770 million years since the Big Bang.

== Spectra ==
The quasar spectra reveals sharp peaks at 9500 Å and 9600 Å which is as absorption in the intergalactic medium (IGM) shortward of the Lyα line in the quasar. It also has strong emission lines and a continuum blueward of the C iv emission line that is partly absorbed, suggesting that VIK J2348-3054 is a broad absorption line (BAL) quasar.

Spectra also show that it has been enriched with iron and magnesium. This means that iron could be produced in large amounts by population lll stars with masses of around 100 solar masses which are extremely metal poor. The quasar host may have undergone a significant period of iron enrichment before the cosmic age around 0.8 billion years ago by supernova.
