= Himiko (disambiguation) =

Himiko (ひみこ; 卑弥呼) was a 3rd-century ruler of Yamataikoku, a kingdom in Japan.

Himiko may also refer to:

== People and characters ==
- Himiko Kikuchi (菊池 ひみこ) (born 1953), Japanese jazz pianist

=== Fictional characters ===
- Himiko Kudo or Himiko Kudou, a character in the anime/manga series GetBackers
- Himeko, a character in Mahōtsukai Kurohime
- Himiko Toga, a character in the anime/manga series My Hero Academia
- Himiko Yumeno, a character in the video game Danganronpa V3: Killing Harmony
- Himeko, a character in the video game Honkai: Star Rail

== Places ==
- Himiko (Lyman-alpha blob), in astronomy, a Lyman-alpha blob at red-shift z=6.6

== Arts and entertainment ==
- Himiko (film), a 1974 Japanese film
- House of Himiko, a 2005 Japanese film
- Legend of Himiko, an anime/manga series and computer game

== Other uses ==
- Mitsuoka Himiko, a type of automobile

== See also ==
- The dictionary definition of こ at Wiktionary
- Hime (ひめ)
