= UM 287 =

Quasar located in the constellation Cetus

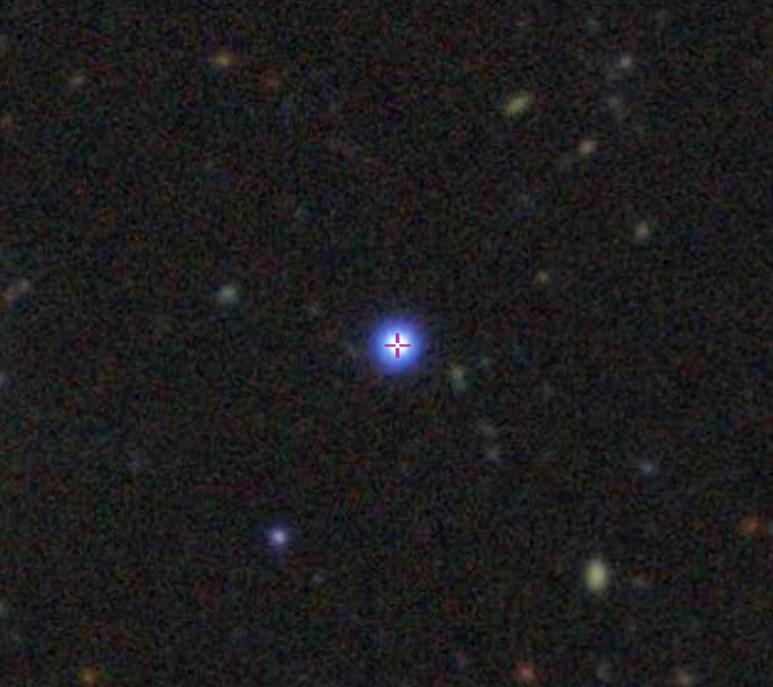
- UM 287, as seen by DESI Legacy Survey

Observation data (J2000.0 epoch)
- Constellation: Cetus
- Right ascension: 00h 52m 02.40s
- Declination: +01d 01m 29.31s
- Redshift: 2.267134
- Heliocentric radial velocity: 679,670 km/s
- Distance: 10.9 Gly (light travel time distance)
- Apparent magnitude (V): 0.073
- Apparent magnitude (B): 0.097
- Surface brightness: 17.6

Characteristics
- Type: Quasar
- Notable features: Quasar in a Lyman-alpha blob

Other designations
- PGC 3048, LBQS 0049+0045, PHL 868, KODIAQ J005202+010129, SDSS J005202.39+010129.3

UM 287 known as PHL 868 and LBQS 0049+0045, is a quasar located in the constellation Cetus. Its redshift is 2.267134 estimating the object to be located 10.9 billion light-years away from Earth.

== Observation history ==
UM 287 was first discovered between 1974 and 1976, where it was observed as a part of the Curtis Schmidt-thin prism survey for extragalactic emission-line objects and possible quasars. The name UM comes from the University of Michigan.

== Characteristics ==
UM 287 is classified as a radio-quiet quasar. It has a bolometric brightness of around 10 ^{47.3} erg /s (10 ^{40} watts), making it one of the brightest quasars ever observed. Furthermore, UM 287 has a Lyman-alpha blob structure surrounding the object. Some of these Lyman-alpha blobs have line luminosities up to ~ 10^{44} erg s^{−1} with their spatial extents exceeding 100 proper kpc. But in this case, the Lyman-alpha blob structure in UM 287 is 1.5 million light-years across making it too big to be contained within the quasar's host galaxy, which is found to be a massive early-type galaxy.

Using the 10-meter Keck I telescope in Hawaii, a team of researchers found there is cold hydrogen emitting Lyman-alpha radiation underneath the spotlight of the quasar's intense ultraviolet beam. The nebula is dubbed the Slug Nebula, named after the UCSC’s banana slug mascot. It is believed to play a major role in powering up the quasar which the Lyα emission produces from a large population of compact (< 20 pc), dense (n_{H} & 3 cm^{−3}), cool gas clumps. From a follow-up field observation, a smooth kinematic profile is suggested. This presents a giant, rotating proto-galactic disk for the brightest portion of the filament showing a cold accretion flow around the black hole in UM 287.

In addition to the Lyman-alpha blob structure, a new dusty star-forming galaxy was found. The galaxy has a 2 mm continuum with its single emission line consistent with the CO(4–3), sitting at a projected distance of 100 kpc southeast from UM 287. The systemic velocity difference is -360 ± 30 km s-1 with respect to UM 287, suggesting the galaxy is a possible contributor to the powering of the Slug Nebula.
