= PG 0844+349 =

Galaxy in the constellation Lynx

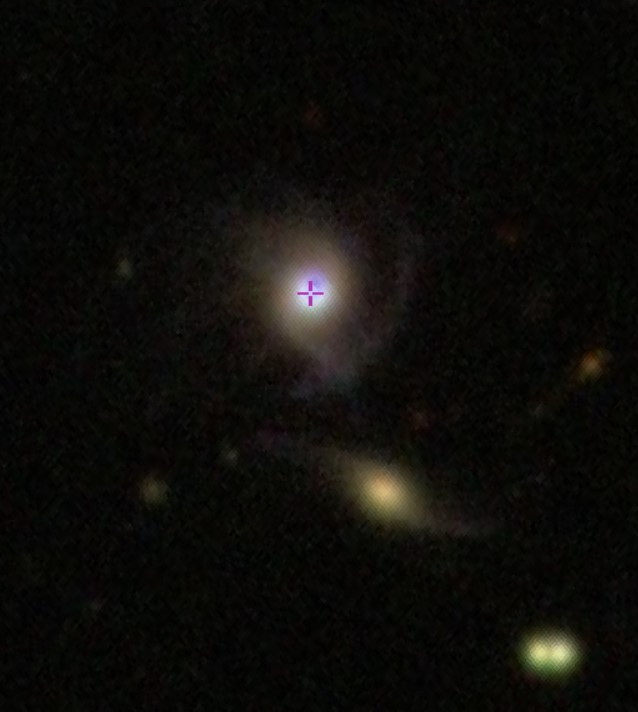
- PG 0844+349 and its companion galaxy captured by SDSS

Observation data (J2000 epoch)
- Constellation: Lynx
- Right ascension: 08h 47m 42.47s
- Declination: +34d 45m 04.40s
- Redshift: 0.064000
- Heliocentric radial velocity: 19,187 km/s
- Distance: 849 Mly (260.3 Mpc)
- Apparent magnitude (V): 0.10
- Apparent magnitude (B): 0.13
- Surface brightness: 13.5

Characteristics
- Type: Sp (d), Sy1,
- Notable features: Seyfert galaxy containing a quasar

Other designations
- TON 951, RBS 724, PGC 24702, RX J0847.6+3445, LAMOST J084742.44+344504.4, CSO 204, 2E 2048, 1ES 0844+349, 2PBC J0848.2+3443

PG 0844+349, also known as TON 951 (abbreviation of Tonantzintla 951), is a galaxy in the southern constellation Lynx, near the border of Cancer. Its redshift is 0.064000, putting the galaxy at 849 million light-years away from Earth.

== Observation history ==
PG 0844+349 was first discovered in 1957 by the Tonantzintla Observatory who was searching for blue stellar objects (mainly white dwarfs) as quasar candidates. Because quasars were not identified until 1963, the nature of this object was unknown. Studying photographic plates that were taken with the 0.7 m Schmidt telescope, it was discovered PG 0844+349 has a Seyfert 1 spectrum, classifying it as a quasar. Mexican astronomers Braulio Iriarte and Enrique Chavira subsequently listed it as the 951st object in the Tonantzintla Catalogue. The same case was applied with TON 618.

In 2009, PG 0844+349 was observed again, by the Swift observatory, and it was noted to have a weak X-ray state. Several weeks later, a follow-up observation by XMM-Newton found it showing a spectral hardening and substantial curvature. This shows that PG 0844+349 is in the phase of reflection-dominated state and its light bending scenario can be accounted for short-term ( ∼1000 s) spectral variability in its source.

== Characteristics ==
PG 0844+349 has an active galactic nucleus. It is classified a Seyfert type 1.0 galaxy, containing two sets of emission lines superimposed onto each other. One set of lines is a low-density (electron density n_{e} 10^{3}-10^{6} cm^{−3}) ionized gas that has widths which corresponds to velocities of several hundred kilometers per second. The other is a set of broad lines, with widths as high as 10^{4} km s^{−1}; but the absence of broad forbidden-line emission indicates that the broad-line gas is of high density (n_{e} 10^{9} cm^{−3} or higher). It can be said PG 0844+349 is a narrow-line Seyfert 1 galaxy considered having all characteristics of type 1 Seyfert galaxies, but it does not have any hardness ratio variations as a single observation finds no strong correlation between the hardness ratio and the continuum luminosity.

PG 0844+349 is also a quasar but with low luminosity. The quasar host is a disturbed face-on barred spiral galaxy, which is found interacting with its companion galaxy, 2MASX J08474179+3444405. Both galaxies show signs of gravitational distortion, in which tidal tails and a hot blue stellar component can be seen. Through the interaction with 2MASX J08474179+3444405, this causes the activity in the central region of PG 0844+349 to awaken causing it to create more star formation with its black hole mass suppressed by its increasing starburst luminosity. This gives it its quasar appearance.

== Observation ==
In a 2002 observation of PG 0844+349, it was found to be in a historically high state compared to the prior observation by X-rays. This shows a featureless spectrum containing a strong soft excess that is over the extrapolation of a hard power law. From the acceptable descriptions of the spectral continuum, the comptonization model is represented by its Gamma_{soft} ~ 2.75, Gamma_{hard} ~ 2.25 and a break energy of E_{break} of ~ 1.35 keV, meaning the temperature is low and have a higher optical depth than in broad-line Seyfert galaxies. Further observation shows the flux in PG 0844+349 varying achromatically on its time scale, in relatively few seconds by ~ 25%. This puts constraints on the current models of Comptonizing accretion disk coronae.

According to observation from the ASCA satellite, researchers has found PG 0844+349 has a high state with a photon index of 1.98 and an Fe Kα line with EW ~ 300 eV. Even its X-ray flux ranging in the 2-10 keV band is considered highly variable. They found that the fastest variation detected reaches up to 2 × 10^{4} s but less than 60%. Given the state of PG 0844+349, the measured excess variance fits well in comparison with the L_{2-10 keV} relation for Seyfert 1 galaxies; the flux variability in the 0.5-2.0 keV band has a slightly higher amplitude than in the 2-10 keV band. Researchers noted the optical microvariability of PG 0844+349 is driven by reprocessing of variable X-ray fluxes, provided one-half of its absorbed X-rays are reradiated in the optical-to-ultraviolet band.

== Black hole ==
The supermassive black hole in PG 0844+349 has an estimated solar mass of 2.138×10^{7}. This makes the galaxy contain one of the largest black holes, but a lower black hole mass putting it between Messier 58 and Centaurus A. Only TON 618 has a higher black hole solar mass of 4.07×10^{10} compared to PG 0844+349.
