= LAE J095950.99+021219.1 =

Galaxy in the constellation Sextans

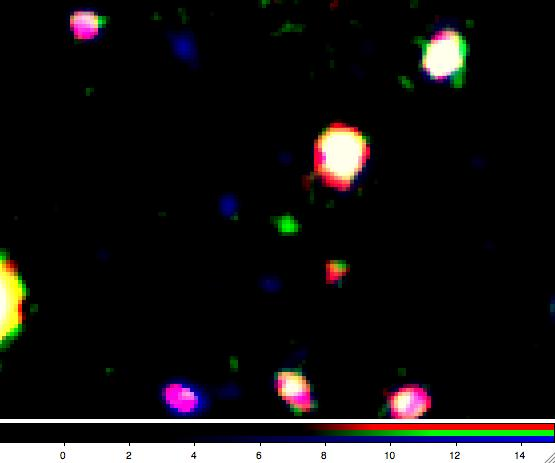

Observation data (J2000 epoch)
- Constellation: Sextans
- Right ascension: 09^{h} 59^{m} 50.99^{s}
- Declination: +02° 12′ 49.1″
- Redshift: 6.944
- Distance: 13 billion light-years (light travel distance); 28.07 billion light years (comoving distance)
- Apparent magnitude (V): 24.1

Characteristics
- Type: Lyman-alpha emitter

Other designations
- [HMR2011] LAE 2

LAE J095950.99+021219.1 is one of the most distant galaxies discovered as of yet, and has high scientific use, as it has revealed many important details of the early universe and emerging stars. LAE J095950.99+021219.1 is about 13 billion light years away and is among the most-distant known objects in the universe. It is a Lyman-alpha emitter.

LAE J095950.99+021219.1 was discovered in mid-2012. It was observed using the Magellan Telescopes at the Las Campanas Observatory in Chile. LAE J095950.99+021219.1 is emitting light identified at redshift 6.944. It is 2-3 times fainter than other Lyman Alpha Emitters.

== See also ==
- List of the most distant astronomical objects
