= MAMMOTH-1 =

Very large radio-quiet nebula

Nebula

Observation data: J2000 epoch
- Right ascension: 14^{h} 41^{m} 25.0^{s}
- Declination: +40° 03′ 15.0″
- Distance: z=2.32
- Constellation: Boötes

Physical characteristics
- Radius: 440,000 pc

MAMMOTH-1 is a large ultraluminous lyman Alpha emitting radio-quiet nebula located near the center of a massive galaxy overdensity named BOSS1441 at a redshift distance of z= 2.32. The nebula has a size of 440 kiloparsecs making it one of the largest lyman-alpha nebula known comparable or even larger than the Slug Nebula.

As of to date, this nebula has the highest lyman alpha luminosity of any nebula with a luminosity of 5.2x10^44 ergs.
