= TON S180 =

Seyfert galaxy in the constellation Cetus

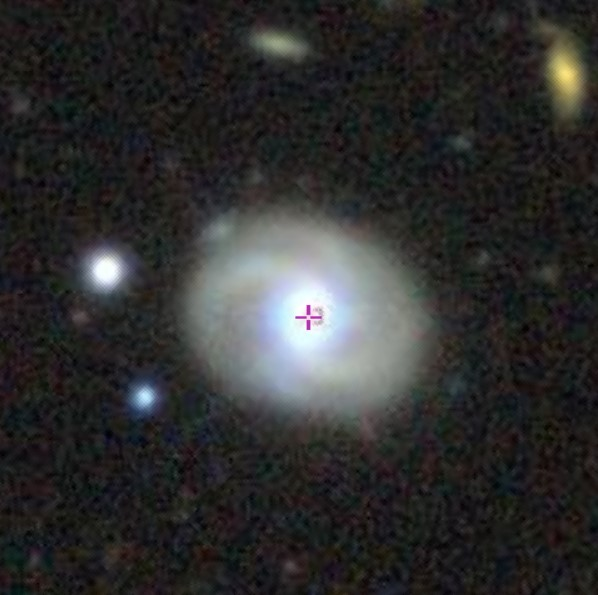
- TON S180, as seen on DESI Legacy Surveys

Observation data (J2000 epoch)
- Constellation: Cetus
- Right ascension: 00^{h} 57^{m} 19.94^{s}
- Declination: −22° 22′ 59.10″
- Redshift: 0.061980
- Heliocentric radial velocity: 18,581 km/s
- Distance: 827 Mly (253.55 Mpc)
- Apparent magnitude (V): 14.34
- Apparent magnitude (B): 14.6

Characteristics
- Type: SABa, Sy1.2
- Apparent size (V): 0.35' × 0.29'

Other designations
- IRAS F00548-2238, PHL 912, EUVE J0057-22.3, LEDA 87796, RX J0057.3-2222, LEDA 815045

TON S180 (abbreviation of Tonantzintla S180) is a Seyfert galaxy located in the southern constellation of Cetus. It is located 827 million light years from Earth. The galaxy is classified as a quasi-stellar object (QSO) because of its high luminosity and is located 3.6 degrees northeast from NGC 253, and 2.8 degrees southeast from NGC 247.

== Discovery and observation ==
TON S180 was first discovered in the year 1958 by Mexican astronomers who catalogued the object as entry number 180 under the Tonantzintla Blue Stellar Object Survey. In 1962 the object was then catalogued as PHL 912 by the Palomar-Haro-Luyten Survey. Subsequently, in 1980 and 1995, TON S180 was detected as an ultraviolet emitter by the Kiso Schmidt Camera Survey and the Extreme Ultraviolet Explorer.

== Characteristics ==
TON S180 is categorized a narrow-line Seyfert galaxy. It has a prototype 'bare' active galactic nucleus with a total infrared luminosity of L_{bol} ~ 5 × 10^{45} erg s^{−1}, but no traces of absorption. The galaxy has a vertical soft X-ray spectrum measuring a photon index of Γ = 2.68 and a Hβ width measuring 900 km s^{−1}. In addition, TON S180 has a short galactic column density along the line of sight, approximately N_{H} = 1.52 × 10^{20} cm^{−2}. It has an absolute magnitude of M_{B} = -23.1 and an estimated central black hole mass of M ~ 2 × 10^{7} M_{Θ}. According to a spectral energy distribution presented for TON S180, it is shown more energy is emitted in the 10-100 eV band.

The host galaxy of TON S180 is a spiral galaxy of type SABa classification. The galaxy appears as a star-like object found obscured by its own circular halo. It contains a sharp and narrow iron line, as well as having a smooth soft excess unable to be produced by relativistic reflection based on observations of its X-ray spectrum.

TON S180 is known to be extremely variable compared to other Seyfert galaxies. Every few thousand seconds, its X-ray flux would show a factor of 2 variability, which, comparing to both the 0.5-2 and 2-10 keV bands, the former has a significantly high σ 2 root mean square. According to the Far Ultraviolet Spectroscopic Explorer, which acquired a high-resolution spectra for the galaxy, TON S180 shows ultraviolet absorption by five-times ionized oxygen but no hydrogen absorption, indicating its absorbing gas is currently in a high ionization state.
