= Jackpot Nebula =

Large Lyman-Alpha nebula with four quasars embedded in it

Nebula

Observation data

Physical characteristics
- Radius: 350 kpc pc
- Notable features: Four embedded quasars within it

The Jackpot Nebula is a large luminous Lyman-Alpha nebula located at a distance of z=2.041 with a size of 350 kpc. It has four quasars embedded within it and a overdensity of Lyman-Alpha emitting galaxies.

The four quasars embedded within the Jackpot Nebula irradiate the nebula causing it to emitting light.
