= Lyman-alpha blob 1 =

Lyman-alpha blob in the constellation of Aquarius

Interstellar cloud
- Intergalactic cloud
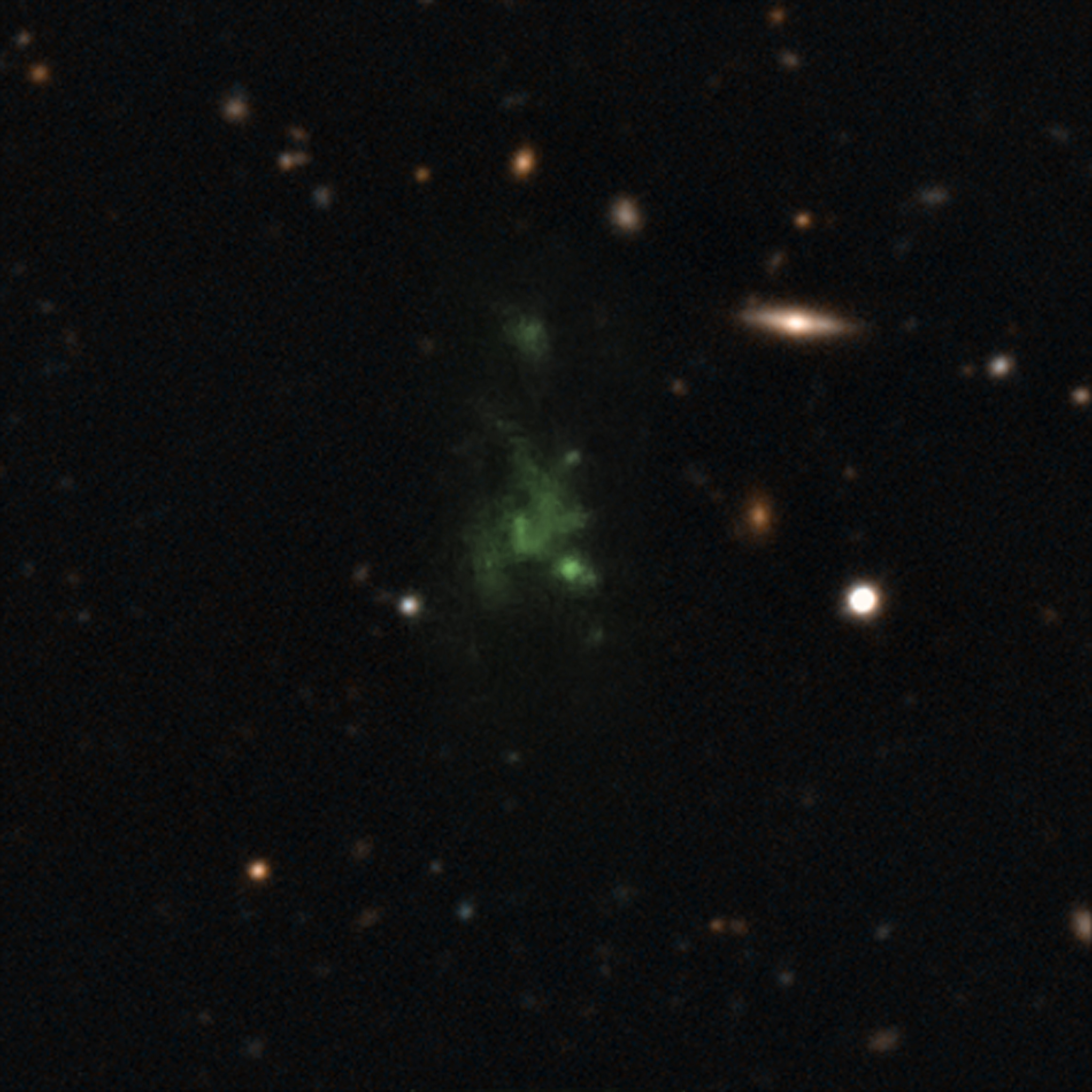
- Polarized image of LAB-1, shown as the faint, green gas cloud.

Observation data: J2000 epoch
- Subtype: Lyman-alpha blob
- Right ascension: 22^{h} 17^{m} 25.97^{s}
- Declination: +00° 12′ 38.9″
- Distance: 1.15 × 10^{10} ly
- Constellation: Aquarius

Physical characteristics
- Radius: 150,000 ly
- Designations: SMM J221726+0013, WBG2010 C11

Lyman-alpha blob 1 (LAB-1) is a giant cosmic cloud of gas located in the constellation of Aquarius, approximately 11.5 billion light-years from Earth with a redshift (z) of 3.09. It was discovered unexpectedly in 2000 by Charles Steidel and colleagues, who were surveying for high-redshift galaxies using the 200 inch (5.08 m) Hale Telescope at the Palomar Observatory. The researchers had been investigating the abundance of galaxies in the young Universe when they came across two objects which would become known as Lyman-alpha blobs—huge concentrations of gases emitting the Lyman-alpha emission line of hydrogen.

LAB-1 is the first discovered Lyman-alpha blob; hence, it has the number 1. It is the prototype of objects of this kind. It is also one of the largest of its kind, measuring 300,000 light years across, three times larger than the Milky Way. The blob appears green on the image because of the combination of the high redshift (z = 3) and the ultraviolet nature of the blob. Imaging with the European Southern Observatory's Very Large Telescope showed that much of the light from the blob is polarized, the proportion increasing and peaking at around 20% at a radius of 45 kiloparsecs (145,000 light-years), forming a huge ring around the blob.

It is still unclear as to why this object is emitting the Lyman-alpha emission radiation. It is thought that the light is coming from galaxies within the central region of the blob. Light of such intensities could be from active galaxies or supermassive black holes actively absorbing matter. An alternate theory is that the light is from cooling gas falling into early galaxies, which has possibly come from cosmic filaments (as galaxies are thought to form at the intersections of these filaments); however, the pattern of polarization found argues against this.

== Gallery ==
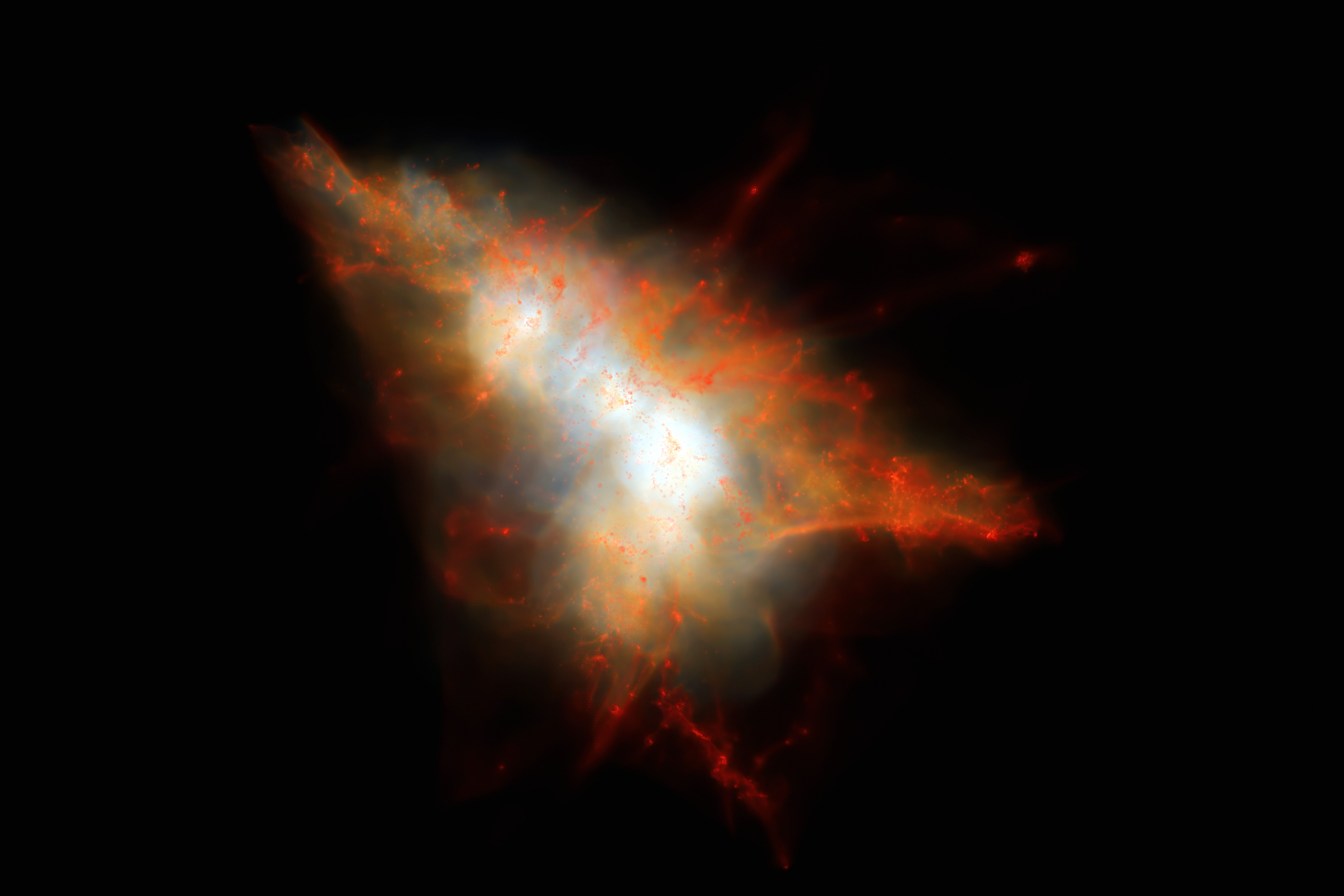
Computer simulation of a Lyman-alpha Blob.

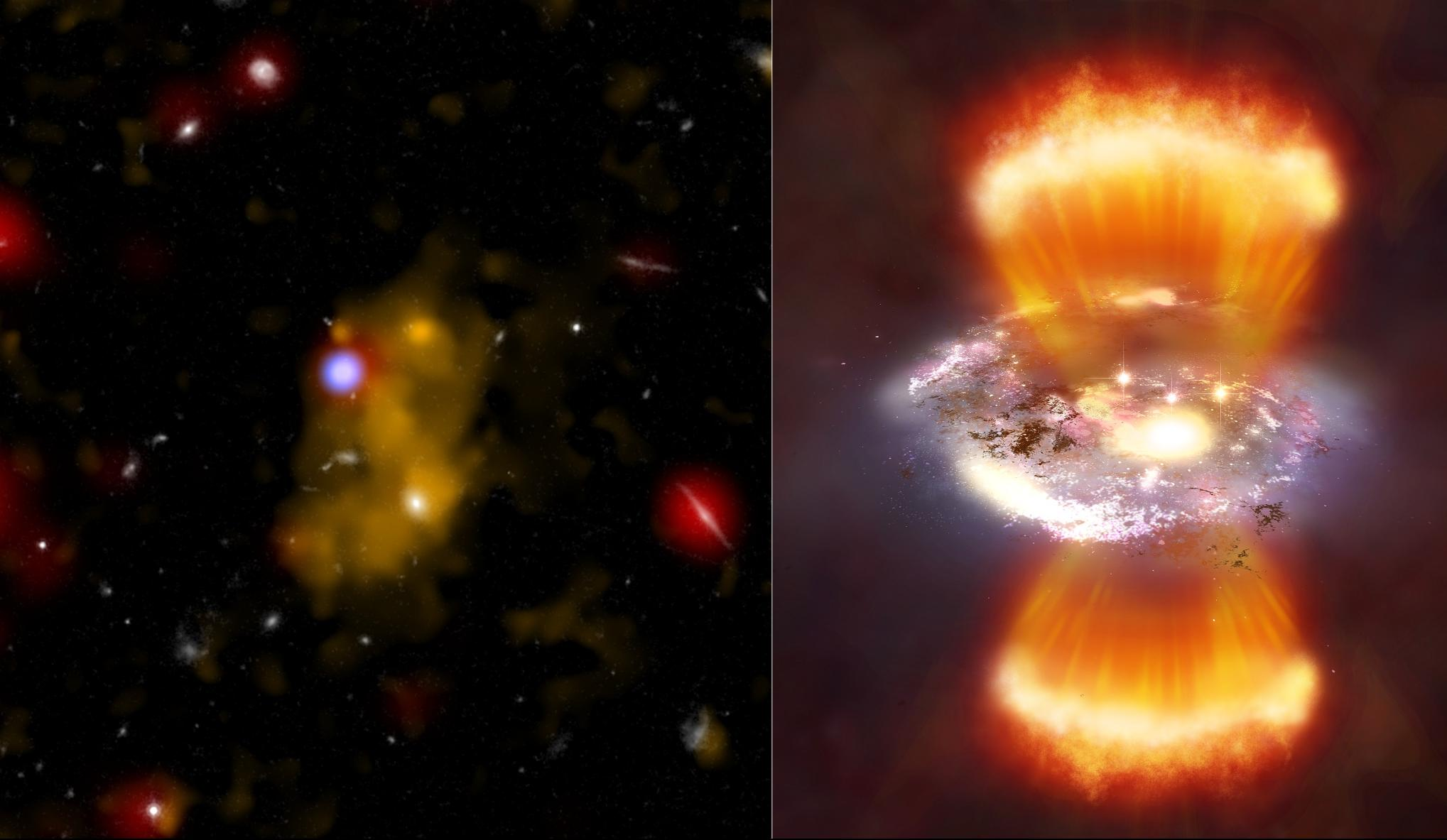
Left: Lyman alpha blob-1 as seen in Lyman-alpha (yellow), infrared (red) and ultraviolet (blue). The round blue object at the upper left of the blob is a giant galaxy. Right: Artist's impression of how the blob may look like if viewed from relatively close.

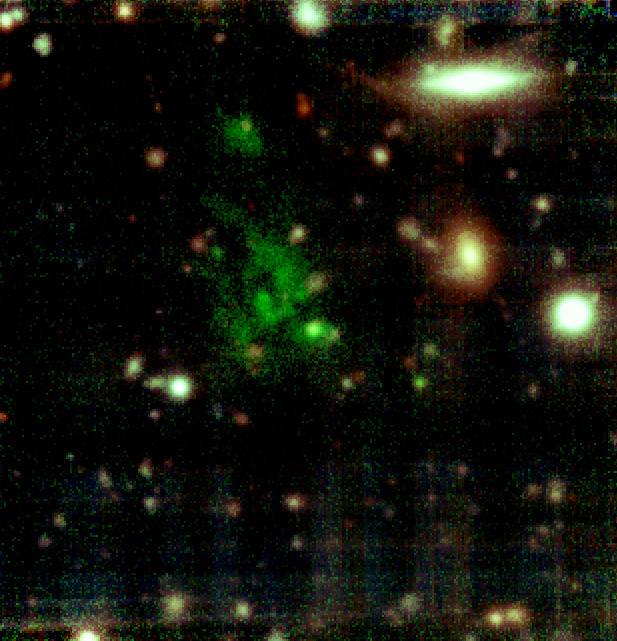
Lyman-alpha blob 1 seen by ESO's VLT MUSE

== See also ==
SSA22 Protocluster
