= BOSS1441 =

Extremely massive galaxy overdensity

Observation data (Epoch J2000)
- Constellation: Boötes
- Right ascension: 14^{h} 41^{m} 24.475^{s}
- Declination: +40° 03′ 09.45″
- Redshift: 2.32

BOSS1441 is an extremely massive galaxy overdensity located at a distance of z=2.32. It is known to be the largest large-scale structure and one of the most overdense structures at redshift z=~2. The overdensity contains a large overdensity of Lyman-Alpha emitting galaxies (LAEs) with 19 being confirmed, multiple galaxies with active galactic nuclei (AGN), and the object MAMMOTH-1, a Lyman-alpha emitting nebula.
