= 4C 05.34 =

Quasar in the constellation of Canis Minor

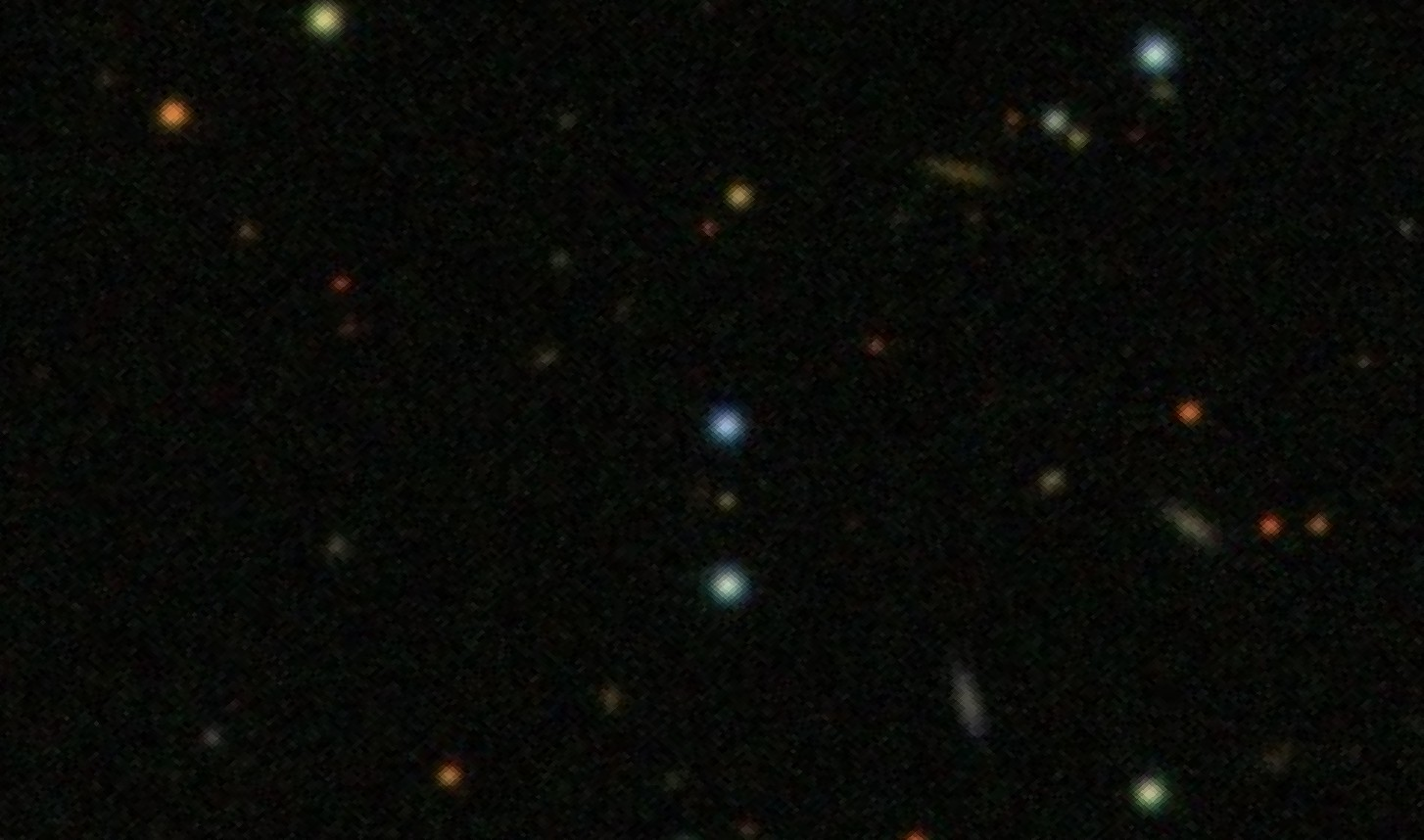
- The quasar 4C 05.34.

Observation data (J2000.0 epoch)
- Constellation: Canis Minor
- Right ascension: 08^{h} 07^{m} 57.53^{s}
- Declination: +04° 32′ 34.53″
- Redshift: 2.876667
- Heliocentric radial velocity: 862,403 km/s
- Distance: 11.063 Gly
- Apparent magnitude (V): 18.16
- Apparent magnitude (B): 18.53

Characteristics
- Type: Opt.var.

Other designations
- PKS 0805+046, SDSS J080757.53+043234.5, LEDA 2818619, PMN J0807+0432, OJ +008, TXS 0805+046, IRCF J080757.5+043234

4C 05.34 is a quasar located in the constellation of Canis Minor. It was first discovered by astronomer Roger Lynds, who identified its high redshift of (z) 2.877 at Kitt Peak National Observatory in May 1970, making it one of the most distant objects known at that time of its discovery. The quasar is also noted for its absorption-line spectrum.

== Description ==
The source of 4C 05.34 has a core-halo structure based on observations by Very Long Baseline Interferometry (VLBI). Its radio core has an estimated flux of 350 ± 25 mJy and a luminosity of 20.2 × 10^{45} erg s^{−1}. There is a weak feature seen northwest from the core according to data taken with MERLIN. A jet is partially resolved with a 5 GHz radio map with at least three jet knots. Based on A-array mapping, it veers toward the west direction. The jetted beam displays extended radio emission. Additionally, the jet seems to connect with its nucleus to the radio hotspot located in the southeast direction.

The quasar is surrounded by a large and bright Lyman-alpha emission nebula with a large absorption-line nearly bisecting it. This nebula is asymmetrical, has an extension of 130 kiloparsecs, and a luminosity measurement in the range of 10^{45} erg -s^{1}. Most of the emission originates within the south east side of the quasar. A diffused continuum source is seen 7 arcseconds south from its nucleus coinciding with the enhanced Lyman-alpha emission suggesting a possible companion galaxy.

4C 05.34 is marginally variable with a magnitude range of 0.114. When observed during the Hamburg Quasar Monitoring program conducted at Calar Alto Observatory, its light curve only documented a slight overall brightening. Low amplitude variability was noted with a radio flux of 0.31 Jy at 6 centimeters. Optical behavior of 4C 05.34 was also found having short-term changes.

A rich system of absorption-lines has been identified in the quasar's spectrum. Based on studies, two of the absorption-lines have redshifts of 2.877 and 2.475, while the others are located at 1.014, 0.959 and 0.702. In addition, a molecular hydrogen absorption feature was also identified and located at the redshift of 2.6354. The absorption systems also displays Lyman-alpha and Lyman-beta emission.
