= Tonantzintla Observatory =

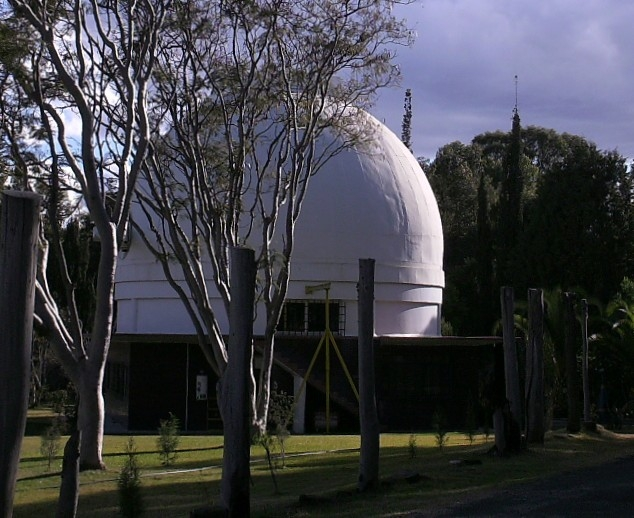
- Alternative names: tona
- Organization: INAOE, UNAM
- Location: San Andrés Cholula, Puebla, Mexico
- Coordinates: 19.0315°N 98.3151°W
- Altitude: 2,166 metres (7,106 ft)
- Established: 1942
- Website: OANTON OAN - Tonantzintla

Telescopes
- unnamed telescope: 1.0 m reflector
- unnamed telescope: 0.7 m Schmidt

Tonantzintla Observatory (Spanish: Observatorio de Tonantzintla) is an astronomical observatory located in the municipality of San Andrés Cholula in the Mexican state of Puebla. It consists of two adjacent facilities: the National Astrophysical Observatory of Tonantzintla (Spanish: Observatorio Astrofísico Nacional de Tonantzintla - OANTON), operated by the National Institute of Astrophysics, Optics and Electronics (INAOE), and the National Astronomical Observatory - Tonantzintla (Spanish: Observatorio Astronómico Nacional - Tonantzintla—OAN - Tonantzintla), operated by the National Autonomous University of Mexico (UNAM). OANTON is located on the INAOE campus, which includes numerous other buildings. OAN - Tonantzintla is located immediately to the east on mostly unused property. The observatory is located 11 kilometres (6.8 mi) west of Puebla and 33 kilometres (21 mi) east of Popocatépetl, eruptions of which sometimes interfere with observing.

== National Astrophysical Observatory of Tonantzintla ==
OANTON was dedicated in February 1942 in a ceremony attended by the President of Mexico, Manuel Ávila Camacho, and other dignitaries. The project was begun some time earlier by Luis Enrique Erro, who was an astronomer by training but for many years had been the Mexican ambassador to the United States. In 1954 Guillermo Haro became the director of OANTON, and in 1971 the observatory became INAOE under his direction. In the same year INAOE began building a new observatory in Cananea, Sonora, which is now called Guillermo Haro Observatory.

=== Telescopes ===
- A 0.7 m (28 in) Schmidt camera has been the primary telescope at OANTON since it was opened. It was built in the Harvard College Observatory shops with optics provided by PerkinElmer. It was installed in 1942, and was used by Haro to study Herbig–Haro objects in detail. The telescope has not been upgraded with a digital sensor.
- A solar telescope was donated by Erro some time before 1957.

== National Astronomical Observatory - Tonantzintla ==
OAN - Tonantzintla was established in 1948, when observing conditions at the OAN location in Valley of Mexico became too degraded by light pollution to be useful. OAN was first established on the balcony of Chapultepec Castle in Mexico City in 1878. It was moved to Tacubaya, then on the outskirts of the city, to a building that was started in 1884 and completed in 1909. OAN completed the next move to Tonantzintla in 1951. By the mid-1960s, the night sky over the observatory became so polluted that research was hampered. OAN began looking for a new location 1966, and determined that Sierra de San Pedro Mártir would be an excellent site. The first telescope at the new observatory was installed in 1969 using a mirror polished by OANTON and UNAM.

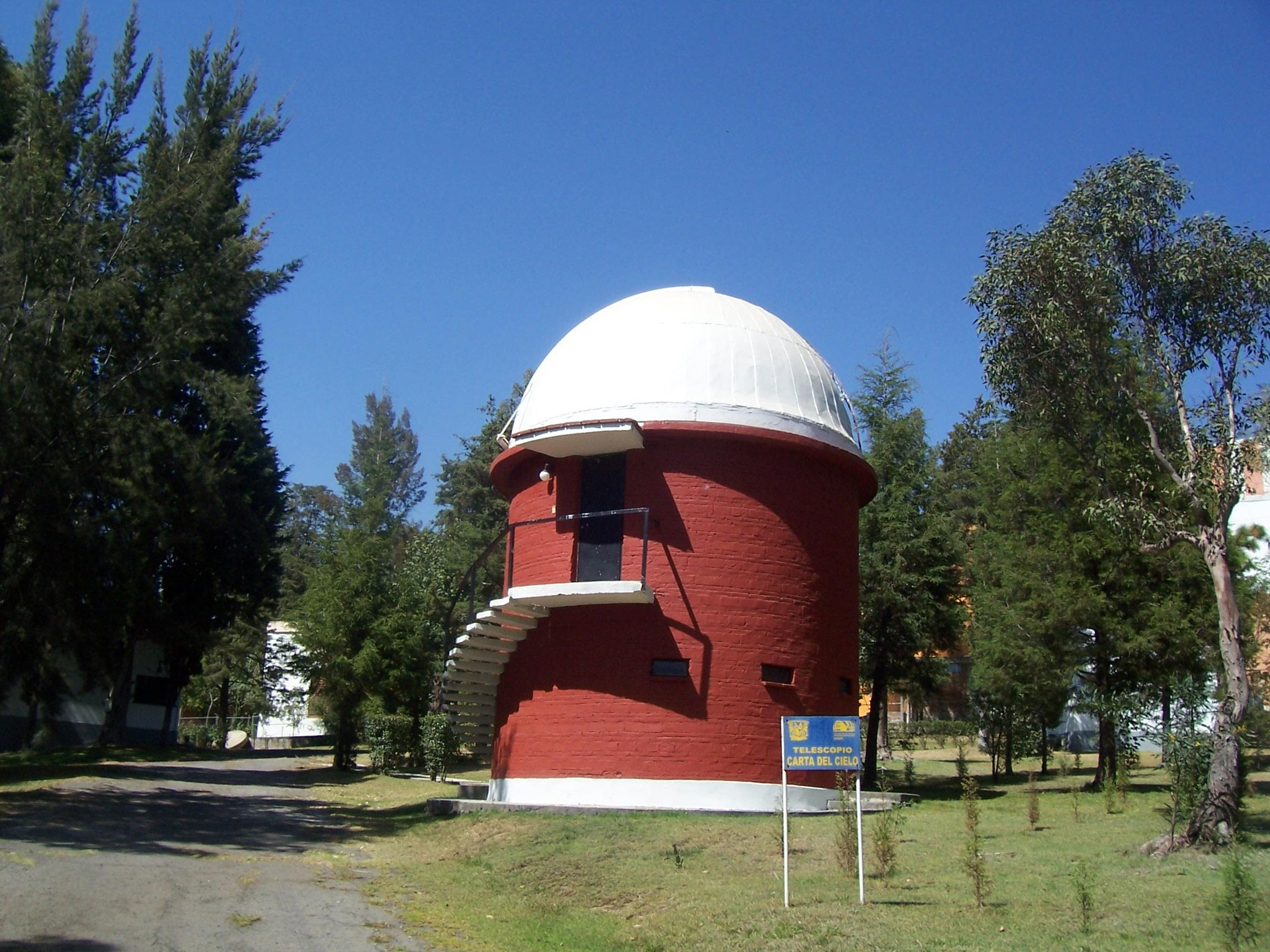
Dome of the Carte du Ciel telescope

=== Telescopes ===
- A 1.0 m (39 in) Cassegrain reflector built by Rademakers Aandrijvingen B.V. of Amsterdam saw first light in 1961. The primary and secondary mirrors were figured by Don Hendrix of Mount Wilson Observatory. It was automated in the 1990s and is now used by students at UNAM in Mexico City.
- A Carte du Ciel-type double-astrograph refractor with 33 cm (13 in) lens in the larger telescope was built in 1891 and installed at Tacubaya. It was moved to Tonantzintla in 1951.

==== Former telescopes ====
- A solar radio interferometer operating at 17.5 MHz was installed with the help of the Soviet Union in 1970, and was reactivated in 1987. It is now located at UNAM in Mexico City.

== Tonantzintla Catalogue ==
The Tonantzintla Catalogue (TON) is a list of stars published in the Bulletin of Tonantzintla and Tacubaya Observatories.

=== Objects ===
- Tonantzintla 1. Also referred as Pismis 25. It was discovered by James Dunlop in 1826. Paris Pismis cataloged it as Tonantzintla 1 or Ton 1 in (Pismis, 1959)
- Tonantzintla 2-24. Discovered by Paris Pismis in 1959.
- Tonantzintla 117. From K.G. Malmiquis Catalogue, 1936.
- Tonantzintla 185. Registered by W J Luyten y F. D. Miller.
- Tonantzintla 193. Registered by W. J. Luyten.
- Tonantzintla 577. Registered by W. J. Luyten, 1955.
- Tonantzintla 618. Registered by Braulio Iriarte y Enrique Chavira, 1957.
- Tonantzintla 951. Registered by Brauilo Iriarte y Enrique Chavira, 1957.

== See also ==
- Large Millimeter Telescope
- List of astronomical observatories
