= Slug Nebula =

Large nebula

Nebula

Observation data
- Distance: z=2.283

Physical characteristics
- Radius: 450 kpc pc
- Notable features: One of the largest and luminous Lyman-alpha nebula

The Slug Nebula is one of the largest and most luminous Lyman-alpha nebula discovered so far extending over 450 kpc. The nebula which sits at a distance of z=2.283 surrounds a bright quasar named UM287.

It has a high surface brightness and is filimentary. This high surface brightness implies two things: (1) very large densities of cold and ionized gas, (2) very large colum densities of neutral hydrogen.
