= Lyman-alpha blob =

Astronomical object type

Animation of a Lyman-alpha blob.

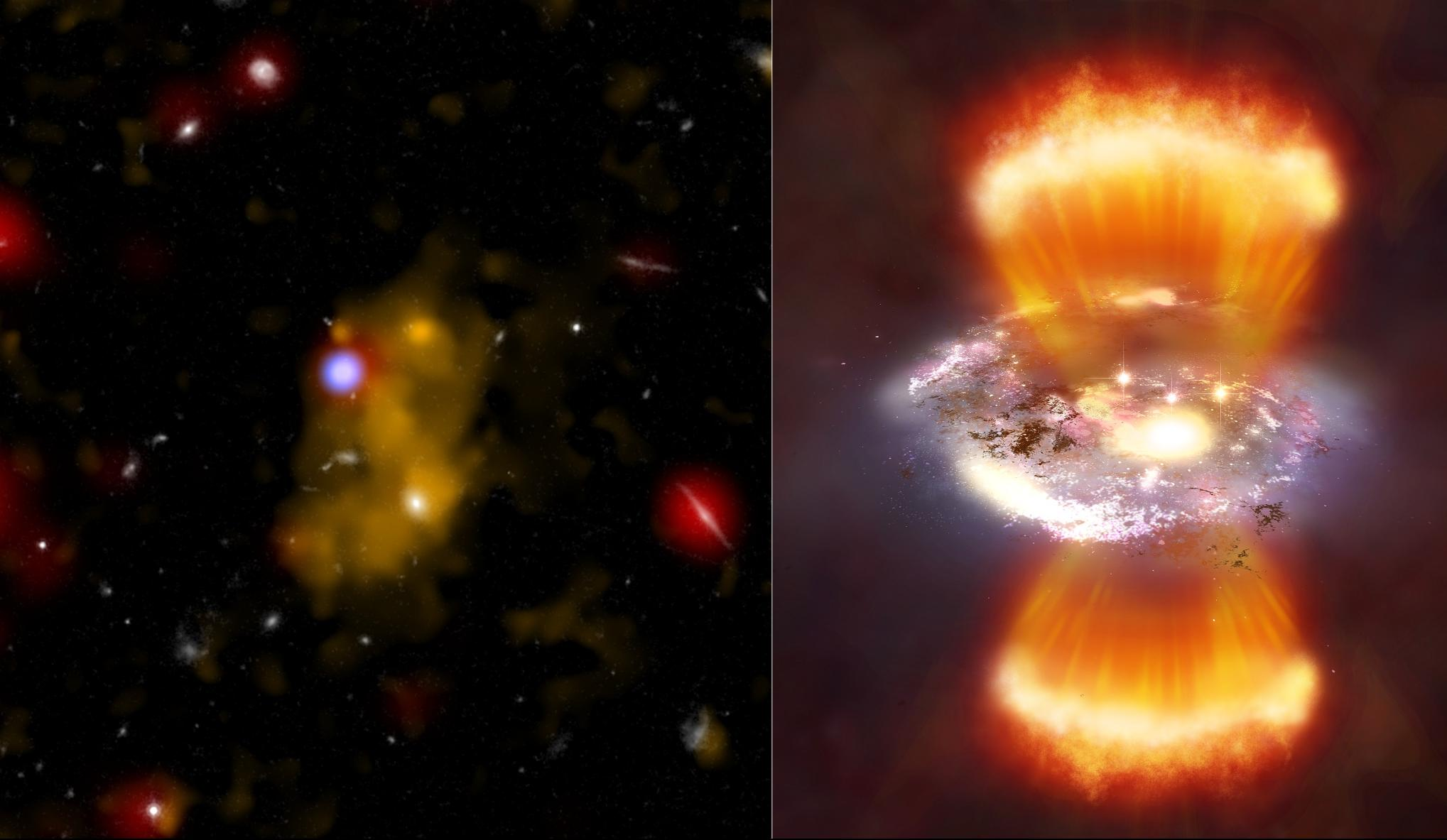
The giant Lyman-alpha blob LAB-1 (left) and an artist's impression of what it might look like if viewed from relatively close (right).

In astronomy, a Lyman-alpha blob (LAB) is a huge concentration of a gas emitting the Lyman-alpha emission line. LABs are some of the largest known individual objects in the Universe. Some of these gaseous structures are more than 400,000 light years across— for comparison, calculations of the size of our own Milky Way galaxy put it at about 87,400 light years (or 26.8 kpc) across. So far, Lyman-alpha blobs have been found only in the high-redshift universe because of the ultraviolet nature of the Lyman-alpha emission line. Since Earth's atmosphere is very effective at filtering out UV photons, the Lyman-alpha photons must be redshifted in order to be transmitted through the atmosphere.

The most famous Lyman-alpha blobs were discovered in 2000 by Steidel et al. Matsuda et al., using the Subaru Telescope of the National Astronomical Observatory of Japan extended the search for LABs and found over 30 new LABs in the original field of Steidel et al., although they were all smaller than the originals. These LABs form a structure which is more than 200 million light-years in extent. It is currently unknown whether LABs trace overdensities of galaxies in the high-redshift universe (as high redshift radio galaxies—which also have extended Lyman-alpha halos—do, for example), nor which mechanism produces the Lyman-alpha emission line, or how the LABs are connected to the surrounding galaxies. Lyman-alpha blobs may hold valuable clues to determine how galaxies are formed.

The most massive Lyman-alpha blobs have been discovered by Tristan Friedrich et al. (2021), Steidel et al. (2000), Francis et al. (2001), Matsuda et al. (2004), Dey et al. (2005), Nilsson et al. (2006), and Smith & Jarvis et al. (2007).

== Examples ==
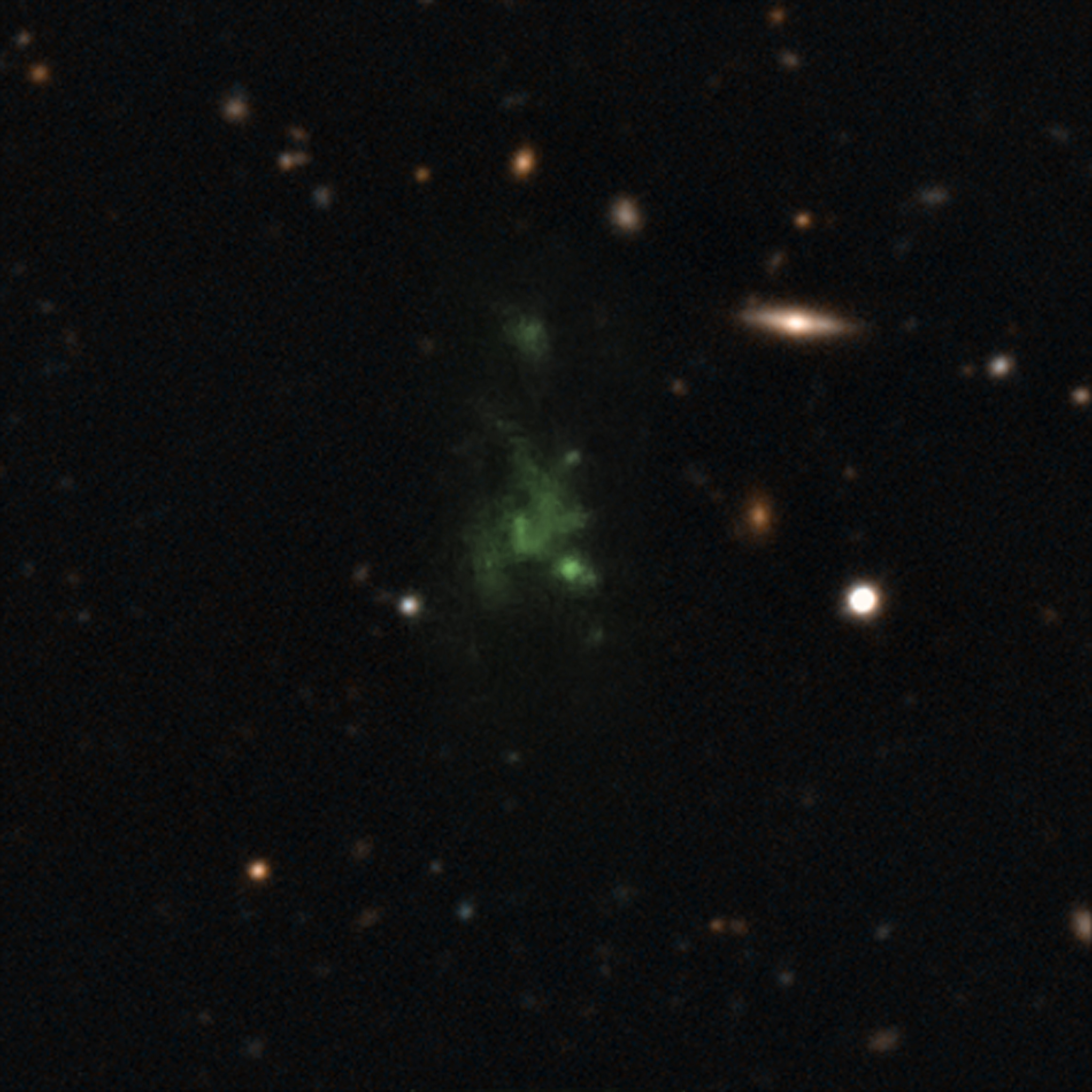
Composite of two different images taken with the FORS instrument on the Very Large Telescope of the Lyman-alpha blob LAB-1 in the constellation of Aquarius. Credit ESO/M. Hayes.

- Himiko
- LAB-1
- EQ J221734.0+001701, the SSA22 Protocluster
- TON 618, hyperluminous quasar powering a Lyman-alpha blob; also possesses one of the most massive black holes known.

== See also ==
- Damped Lyman-alpha system
- Galaxy filament
- Green bean galaxy
- Lyman-alpha forest
- Lyman-alpha emitter
- Lyman break galaxy
- Newfound Blob (disambiguation)
