= Himiko (Lyman-alpha blob) =

Large gas cloud in the constellation Cetus

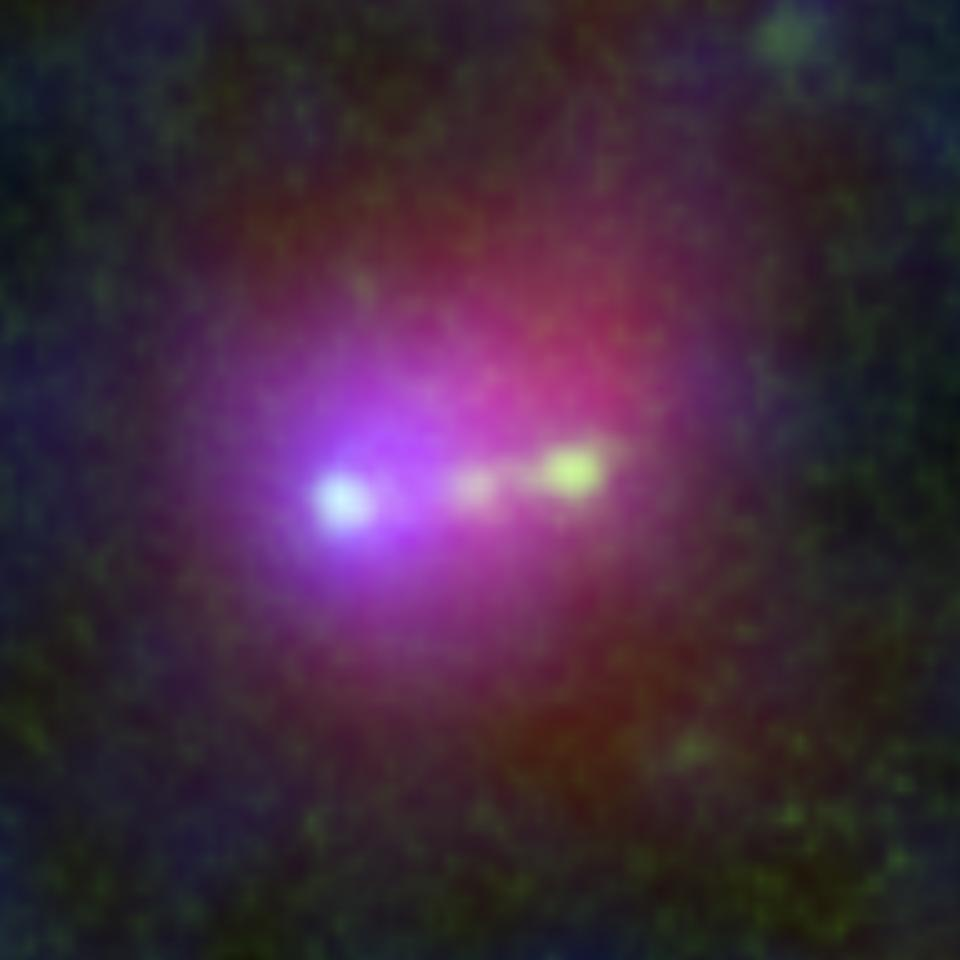
- Image of Himiko using data from various sources
- Object type: Lyman-alpha blob, emission-line galaxy

Observation data (Epoch J2000.0)
- Constellation: Cetus
- Right ascension: 02^{h} 17^{m} 57.563^{s}
- Declination: −05° 08′ 44.45″
- Redshift: 6.1
- Apparent magnitude: 24.61 ±0.08, 24.8 ±0.08, 24.9 ±0.2, 25.82 ±0.15

Himiko is a large gas cloud found at redshift of z=6.6 that predates similar Lyman-alpha blobs. At the time of its discovery in 2009, researchers said it "may represent the most massive object ever discovered in the early universe". It is located in Cetus at redshift z=6.595, about 12.9 billion light-years from Earth, or about 75×10^{21} miles (122×10^{21} kilometers).

== Characteristics ==
This nebular gas cloud is thought to be a protogalaxy, caught in the act of formation. There have been no spectroscopic signatures of anything other than hydrogen or helium, and its luminance cannot be ascribed to gravitational lensing, black holes, or exterior excitation. The lack of any chemical signatures other than hydrogen and helium illustrate the extreme primitiveness of the object, and the fact that it is early enough so as not to be polluted by carbon signatures from young stars.

== Size ==
It is 55,000 light-years across (half the diameter of our galaxy), and at the time of discovery, said to "hold more than 10 times as much mass as the next largest object found in the early universe, or roughly the equivalent mass of 40 billion Suns".

== Discovery ==
Masami Ouchi, a researcher at the Carnegie Institution in Pasadena, California, stated "I have never heard about any [similar] objects that could be resolved at this distance...[i]t's kind of record-breaking."

== Name ==
The object was named by a Japanese scientist after the 3rd-century Japanese shaman queen Himiko.
