= Lyman-alpha emitter =

Type of distant galaxy

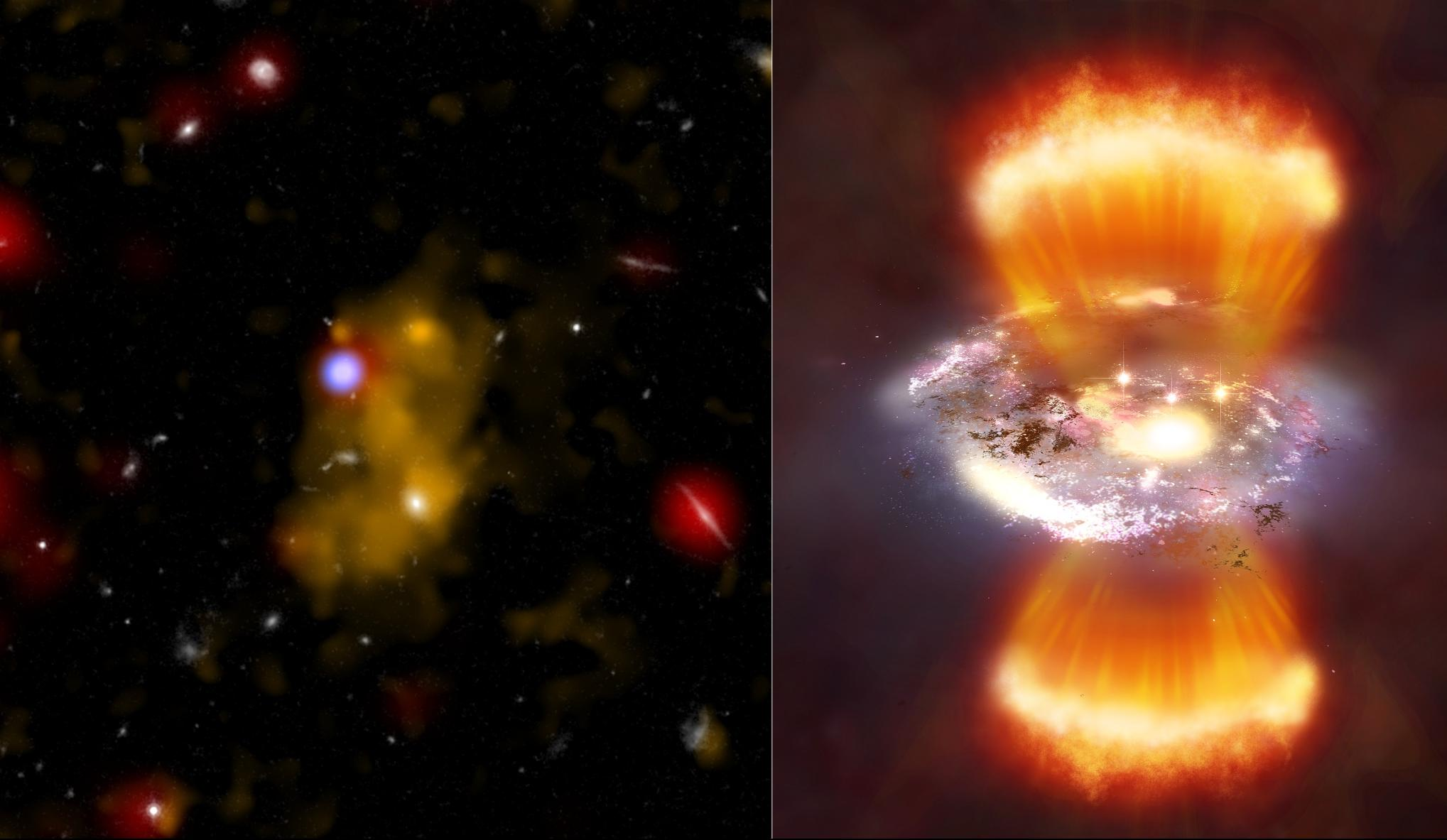
A Lyman alpha emitter (left) and an artist's impression of what one might look like if viewed at a relatively close distance (right).

A Lyman-alpha emitter (LAE) is a type of distant galaxy that emits Lyman-alpha radiation from neutral hydrogen.

Most known LAEs are extremely distant, and because of the finite travel time of light they provide glimpses into the history of the universe. They are thought to be the progenitors of most modern Milky Way type galaxies. These galaxies can be found nowadays rather easily in narrow-band searches by an excess of their narrow-band flux at a wavelength which may be interpreted from their redshift

$$1+z=\frac{\lambda}{1215.67\mathrm{\AA}}$$

where z is the redshift, $\lambda$ is the observed wavelength, and 1215.67 Å is the wavelength of Lyman-alpha emission. The Lyman-alpha line in most LAEs is thought to be caused by recombination of interstellar hydrogen that is ionized by an ongoing burst of star formation. Such Lyman alpha emission was first suggested as a signature of young galaxies by Bruce Partridge and P. J. E. Peebles in 1967. Experimental observations of the redshift of LAEs are important in cosmology because they trace dark matter halos and subsequently the evolution of matter distribution in the universe.

== Properties ==
Lyman-alpha emitters are typically low mass galaxies of 10^{8} to 10^{10} solar masses. They are typically young galaxies that are 200 to 600 million years old, and they have the highest specific star formation rate of any galaxies known. All of these properties indicate that Lyman-alpha emitters are important clues as to the progenitors of modern Milky Way type galaxies.

Lyman-alpha emitters have many unknown properties. The Lyman-alpha photon escape fraction varies greatly in these galaxies, although at high redshift, bright galaxies have decreasing Lyα escape fraction with redshift. The Lyman-alpha escape fraction is what portion of the light emitted at the Lyman-alpha line wavelength inside the galaxy actually escapes and will be visible to distant observers. There is much evidence that the dust content of these galaxies could be significant and therefore is obscuring the brightness of these galaxies. By observing luminous LAEs of a red-shift z>/=7.5 and the area around them in over dense regions, it was found that there is considerable amplification of Lyman alpha transmission in surrounding fainter galaxies up to 3-9 times their usual emission. Within the radius of the chosen LAEs, where the IGM was relatively neutral, Lyman alpha photons were still being transmitted. Through these observations, it was concluded that over dense regions with LAEs had a strong effect on the transmission of Lyman alpha photons. It is also possible that anisotropic distribution of hydrogen density and velocity play a significant role in the varying escape fraction due to the photons' continued interaction with the hydrogen gas (radiative transfer). Evidence now shows strong evolution in the Lyman-alpha escape fraction with redshift, most likely associated with the buildup of dust in the ISM. Dust is shown to be the main parameter setting the escape of Lyman-alpha photons. Additionally the metallicity, outflows, and detailed evolution with redshift is unknown.

LAEs in 1.9 < z < 3.5 show strong UV emission, mostly from a young stellar population with low metallicity. The ionizing radiation escape fraction may be high in these regions, supporting the idea that early LAEs in high redshift could be a key factor driving reionization.

== Importance in cosmology ==
LAEs are important probes of reionization, cosmology (BAO), and they allow probing of the faint end of the luminosity function at high redshift.

The baryonic acoustic oscillation signal should be evident in the power spectrum of Lyman-alpha emitters at high redshift. Baryonic acoustic oscillations are imprints of sound waves on scales where radiation pressure stabilized the density perturbations against gravitational collapse in the early universe. The three-dimensional distribution of the characteristically homogeneous Lyman-alpha galaxy population will allow a robust probe of cosmology. They are a good tool because the Lyman-alpha bias, the propensity for galaxies to form in the highest overdensity of the underlying dark matter distribution, can be modeled and accounted for. Lyman-alpha emitters are over dense in clusters.

Regarding the Epoch of Reionization, it was determined by a study using a simulation that more luminous LAEs, which play a large part in reionization during this period, are highly correlated with the Lyman Continuum. 90% of the escaping Lyman Continuum radiation in the ISM can be credited to LAEs. Another study also found that varying velocities in the ISM around high-redshift galaxies could aid in the escape of Lyman alpha photons from thick dust and clouds, affecting emission data.

== Lyman Alpha Reference Sample ==
The Lyman Alpha Reference Sample (LARS) is a comprehensive observational program designed to study the mechanisms governing Lyα emission and escape in nearby star-forming galaxies. By focusing on a sample of several tens of galaxies at redshifts 0.028–0.19, LARS provides detailed insights into the physical conditions affecting Lyα radiation, serving as a local analog for high-redshift Lyα emitters.

LARS observations reveal that Lyα emission often extends well beyond the regions of star formation, forming halos significantly larger than the Hα emission regions. This extension correlates with low dust content, suggesting that minimal dust allows Lyα photons to scatter to larger radii.

Studies indicate that turbulence within the interstellar medium (ISM) plays a crucial role in Lyα photon escape. Turbulent motions can shift Lyα photons out of resonance, reducing the likelihood of absorption by neutral hydrogen and allowing them to escape more readily.

The kinematic properties of ionized gas, such as velocity dispersion and shear, are found to impact Lyα observables. Galaxies with higher velocity dispersions tend to exhibit higher Lyα escape fractions, indicating that dynamic ISM conditions facilitate Lyα photon escape.

The distribution and geometry of dust within galaxies significantly influence Lyα scattering. A clumpy or uneven dust distribution can create pathways that allow Lyα photons to escape, while uniform dust coverage tends to inhibit escape.

LARS findings suggest that galaxies with lower star formation rate densities and longer gas depletion times tend to have higher Lyα escape fractions. This implies that less intense star-forming environments are more conducive to Lyα photon escape.

== See also ==
- Damped Lyman-alpha system – Concentrations of neutral hydrogen gas
- Lyman-alpha blob – Astronomical object type
- Lyman-alpha forest – Astronomical spectroscopic term
- Lyman-break galaxy – Star-forming galaxies at high redshift
- Lyman limit – Wavelength associated with hydrogen ionisation
- Lyman series – Set of ultraviolet wavelengths emitted by hydrogen
