= Lyman-alpha =

Spectral line of hydrogen in the Lyman series

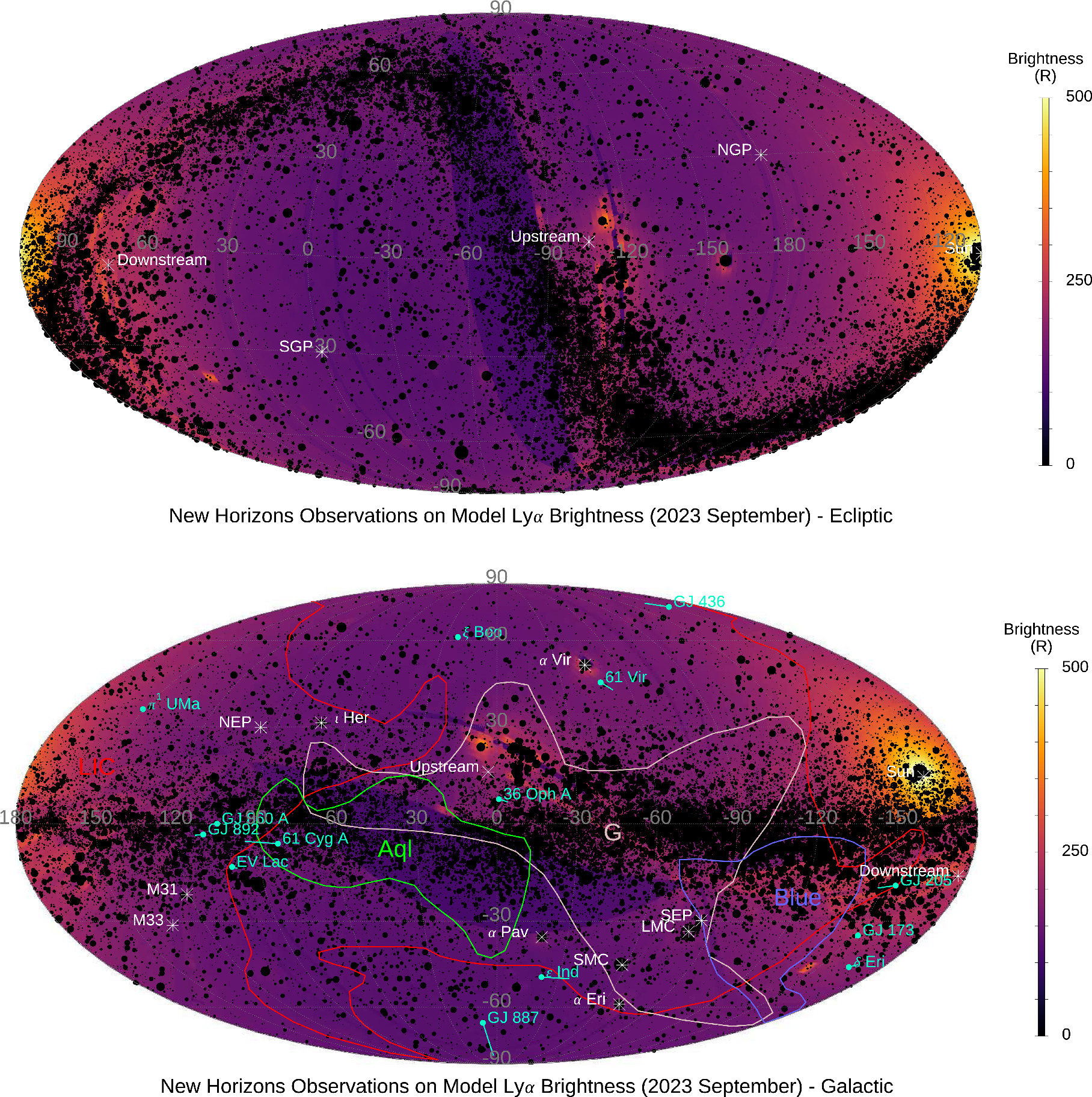
The All-sky New Horizons Alice Lyα maps in ecliptic coordinates centered on the anti-Sun direction, and the lower map is in Galactic coordinates. The c. 90,000 stars in the M. A. Velez et al. (2024) catalog are overlaid as black dots, where the size of the dot is proportional to the logarithm of the expected Alice count rate from each star. The map in Galactic coordinates indicates the outlines of four of the important LISM clouds ("LIC", in red; "Aql" in green; "Blue", in blue; and "G", in tan).

Lyman-alpha, typically denoted by Ly-α or Lyα, is a spectral line of hydrogen (or, more generally, of any one-electron atom) in the Lyman series. A photon is emitted when the atomic electron transitions from an n = 2 orbital to the ground state (n = 1), where n is the principal quantum number. In hydrogen, its wavelength of 1215.67 angstroms (121.567 nm or 1.21567×10^{−7} m), corresponding to a frequency of about 2.46607×10^{15} Hz, places Lyman-alpha in the ultraviolet (UV) part of the electromagnetic spectrum, with a photon energy of 10.2 eV. More specifically, Ly-α lies in vacuum UV (VUV), characterized by a strong absorption in the air.

== Fine structure ==
The Lyman-alpha doublet.

Because of the spin–orbit interaction, the Lyman-alpha line splits into a fine-structure doublet with the wavelengths of 1215.668 and 1215.674 angstroms. These components are called Ly-α_{3/2} and Ly-α_{1/2}, respectively.

The eigenstates of the perturbed Hamiltonian are labeled by the total angular momentum j of the electron, not just the orbital angular momentum l. In the n = 2, l = 1 orbital, there are two possible states, with j = 1/2 and j = 3/2, resulting in a spectral doublet. The j = 3/2 state has a higher energy and so is energetically farther from the n = 1 state to which it is transitioning. Thus, the j = 3/2 state is associated with the more energetic (having a shorter wavelength) spectral line in the doublet.

== Observation ==
Since the hydrogen Lyman-alpha radiation is strongly absorbed by the air, its observation in laboratory requires use of vacuumed spectroscopic systems. For the same reason, Lyman-alpha astronomy is ordinarily carried out by satellite-borne instruments, except for observing extremely distant sources whose redshifts allow the line to penetrate the Earth atmosphere.

The line was also observed in antihydrogen. Within the experimental uncertainties, the measured frequency is equal to that of hydrogen, in agreement with predictions of quantum electrodynamics.

== See also ==
- Lyman limit
- Lyman-alpha forest
- Lyman-alpha emitter
- Lyman-alpha blob
- Lyman-break galaxy
- K-alpha line
