= F200DB-045 =

Possibly one of the oldest galaxies observed

Observation data (J2000 epoch)
- Constellation: Volans
- Right ascension: 07^{h} 23^{m} 22.770^{s}
- Declination: −73° 27′ 39.72″
- Redshift: 20.4

Characteristics
- Type: Lyman-break galaxy

F200DB-045 is a candidate high-redshift galaxy, with an estimated redshift of approximately z = 20.4, corresponding to 168 million years after the Big Bang. If confirmed, it would be one of the earliest and most distant known galaxies observed.

F200DB-045 would have a light-travel distance (lookback time) of 13.7 billion years, and, due to the expansion of the universe, a present proper distance of 36.1 billion light-years.

Nonetheless, the redshift value of the galaxy presented by the procedure in one study may differ from the values presented in other studies using different procedures.

== Discovery ==
The candidate high-redshift galaxy F200DB-045 was discovered within the data from the Early Release Observations (ERO) that was obtained using the Near Infrared Camera of the James Webb Space Telescope (JWST) in July 2022. This data included a nearby galaxy cluster SMACS J0723.3–7327, a massive cluster known as a possible "cosmic telescope" in amplifying background galaxies, including the F200DB-045 background galaxy.

== Distance ==
Only a photometric redshift has been determined for F200DB-045; follow-up spectroscopic measurements will be required to confirm the redshift (see spectroscopic redshift). Spectroscopy could also determine the chemical composition, size and temperature of the galaxy.

If confirmed, the galaxy may have existed in its star formation phase in the early universe, when it would have been composed mostly of dust as well as young and massive population III stars.

== See also ==
- CEERS-93316
- Earliest galaxies
- GLASS-z12
- HD1 (galaxy)
- JADES-GS-z13-0
- List of the most distant astronomical objects
- Peekaboo Galaxy
