= EGSY8p7 =

Galaxy in the constellation Boötes

EGSY8p7 EGSY-2008532660
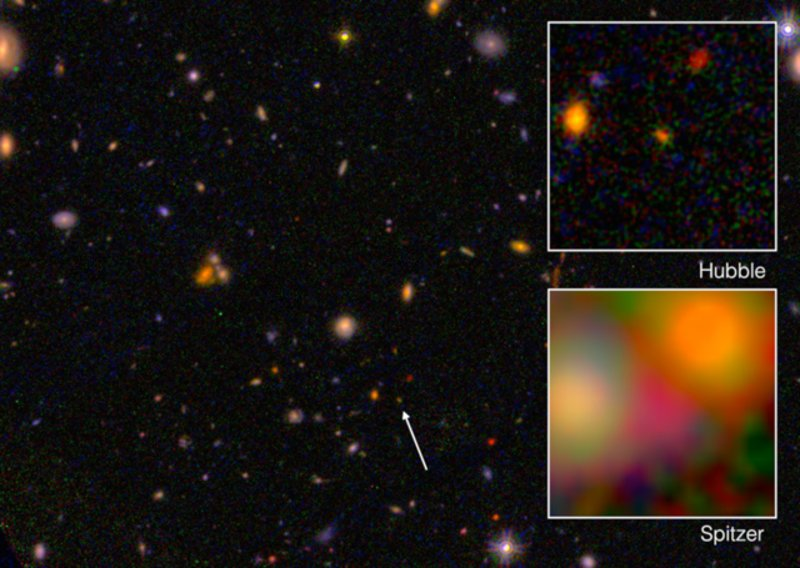
- EGSY8p7 by the Hubble and Spitzer space telescopes

Observation data (J2000 epoch)
- Constellation: Boötes
- Right ascension: 14^{h} 20^{m} 08.50^{s}
- Declination: +52° 53′ 26.60″
- Redshift: 8.683+0.001 −0.004
- Heliocentric radial velocity: 2,603,098 km/s (1,617,490 mi/s)
- Galactocentric velocity: 2,603,221 km/s (1,617,567 mi/s)
- Distance: 13.2 billion ly (4.0 billion pc) (light travel distance); 30.5 billion ly (9.4 billion pc) (comoving distance)
- Apparent magnitude (V): 25.3

Characteristics
- Size: 32000 ly

Other designations
- EGSY8p7, EGS8p7

EGSY8p7 (EGSY-2008532660) is a distant galaxy in the constellation of Boötes, with a spectroscopic redshift of z = 8.68 (photometric redshift 8.57), a light travel distance of 13.2 billion light-years from Earth. Therefore, at an age of 13.2 billion years, it is observed as it existed 570 million years after the Big Bang, which occurred 13.8 billion years ago, using the W. M. Keck Observatory. In July 2015, EGSY8p7 was announced as the oldest and most-distant known object, surpassing the previous record holder, EGS-zs8-1, which was determined in May 2015 as the oldest and most distant object. In March 2016, Pascal Oesch, one of the discoverers of EGSY8p7, announced the discovery of GN-z11, an older and more distant galaxy.

The galaxy contains a supermassive black hole, CEERS 1019.

== Detection ==
The light of the EGSY8p7 galaxy appears to have been magnified twofold by gravitational lensing in the light's travel to Earth, enabling the detection of EGSY8p7, which would not have been possible without the magnification. EGSY8p7's distance from Earth was determined by measuring the redshift of Lyman-alpha emissions. EGSY8p7 is the most distant known detection of hydrogen's Lyman-alpha emissions. The distance of this detection was surprising, because neutral hydrogen (atomic hydrogen) clouds filling the early universe should have absorbed these emissions, even by some hydrogen cloud sources closer to Earth, according to the standard cosmological model. A possible explanation for the detection would be that reionization progressed in a "patchy" manner, rather than homogeneously throughout the universe, creating patches where the EGSY8p7 hydrogen Lyman-alpha emissions could travel to Earth, because there were no neutral hydrogen clouds to absorb the emissions.

EGSY8p7 in the CEERS survey field (James Webb Space Telescope, NIRCam image)

After studying the galaxy with James Webb Space Telescope, researchers "have concluded that the intense star-forming activity within these interacting galaxies energised hydrogen emission and cleared swathes of gas from their surroundings, allowing the unexpected hydrogen emission to escape."

== See also ==
- GN-z11 (z=11.1)
- MACS0647-JD (z=10.7)
- UDFy-38135539 (z=8.55)
- EGS-zs8-1 (z=7.73)

Records
Preceded by GRB 090423	Most distant known astronomical object 2015–2016	Succeeded by GN-z11
Preceded by EGS-zs8-1	Most distant known galaxy 2015–2016	Succeeded by GN-z11
