= GN-z11 =

High-redshift galaxy in the constellation Ursa Major

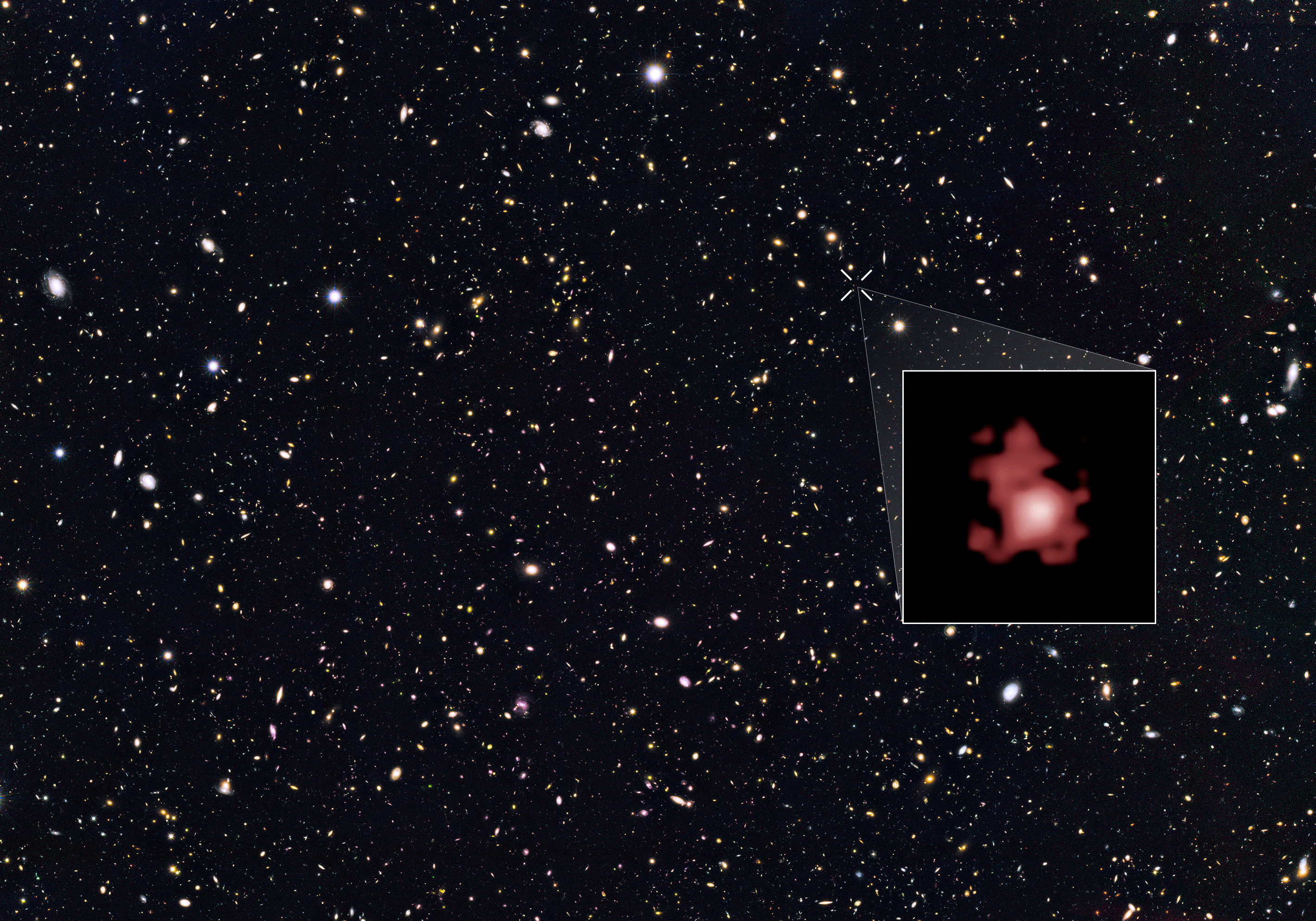
- GN-z11 superimposed on an image from the GOODS-North survey

Observation data (J2000 epoch)
- Constellation: Ursa Major
- Right ascension: 12^{h} 36^{m} 25.46^{s}
- Declination: +62° 14′ 31.4″
- Redshift: 10.6034±0.0013
- Heliocentric radial velocity: 295,050 ± 119,917 km/s (183,336 ± 74,513 mi/s)
- Distance: 32 billion ly (9.8 billion pc) (present proper distance); 13.4 billion ly (4.1 billion pc) (light-travel distance)
- Apparent magnitude (V): 25.8H

Characteristics
- Type: Irregular
- Mass: ~1×10^{9} M_{☉}
- Size: 4,000 ± 2,000 ly (1,200 ± 610 pc)
- Apparent size (V): 0.6arcsec

Other designations
- GN-z10-1, GNS-JD2

GN-z11 is a high-redshift galaxy discovered by NASA's Hubble Space Telescope in the constellation Ursa Major. It is among the farthest galaxies from Earth ever found. The 2015 discovery was published in a 2016 paper headed by Pascal Oesch and Gabriel Brammer (Cosmic Dawn Center). Up until the discovery of JADES-GS-z13-0 in 2022 by the James Webb Space Telescope, GN-z11 was the oldest and most distant galaxy yet identified in the observable universe, having a spectroscopic redshift of z = 10.957, which corresponds to a proper distance of approximately 32 billion light-years (9.8 billion parsecs). (Note: At first glance, the distance of 32 billion light-years (9.8 billion parsecs) might seem impossibly far away in a Universe that is only 13.8 billion (short scale) years old, where a light-year is the distance light travels in a year, and where nothing can travel faster than the speed of light. However, because of the expansion of the universe, the distance of 2.66 billion light-years between GN-z11 and the Milky Way at the time when the light was emitted increased by a factor of (z+1)=12.1 to a distance of 32 billion light-years during the 13.4 billion years it has taken the light to reach us. See: Size of the observable universe, Misconceptions about the size of the observable universe, Measuring distances in expanding space, and Ant on a rubber rope.) Data published in 2024 established that the galaxy contains the most distant, and therefore earliest, black hole known in the universe, estimated at around 1.6 million solar masses.

The object's name is derived from its location in the GOODS-North field of galaxies and its high cosmological redshift number (GN + z11). It is observed as it existed 13.4 billion years ago, just 400 million years after the Big Bang; as a result, its distance is sometimes inappropriately reported without qualification as 13.4 billion light-years, its light-travel distance measurement.

In early 2023, the James Webb Space Telescope observed the galaxy and reported a definitive redshift of z = 10.6034 ± 0.0013.

The galaxy has such a high redshift that its angular diameter distance is actually less than that of some galaxies with lower redshift. This means that the ratio of its angular size (how big it appears in the sky) to its size in light-years is greater.

== Discovery ==
The galaxy was identified by a team studying data from the Hubble Space Telescope's Cosmic Assembly Near-infrared Deep Extragalactic Legacy Survey (CANDELS) and Spitzer Space Telescope's Great Observatories Origins Deep Survey-North (GOODS-North). The research team used Hubble's Wide Field Camera 3 to measure the distance to GN-z11 spectroscopically, measuring the redshift caused by the expansion of the universe. The findings, which were announced in March 2016, revealed the galaxy to be farther away than originally thought, at the distance limit of what the Hubble Telescope can observe. GN-z11 is around 150 million years older than the previous record-holder EGSY8p7, and is observed (shortly after but) "very close to the end of the so-called Dark Ages of the universe", and (during but) "near the very beginning" of the reionization era.

Compared with the Milky Way galaxy, GN-z11 is 1/25 of the size, has 1% of the mass, and is forming new stars approximately twenty times as fast. With a stellar age estimated at 40 million years, it appears the galaxy formed its stars relatively rapidly. The fact that a galaxy so massive existed so soon after the first stars started to form is a challenge to some current theoretical models of the formation of galaxies.

Animation showing the location of GN-z11

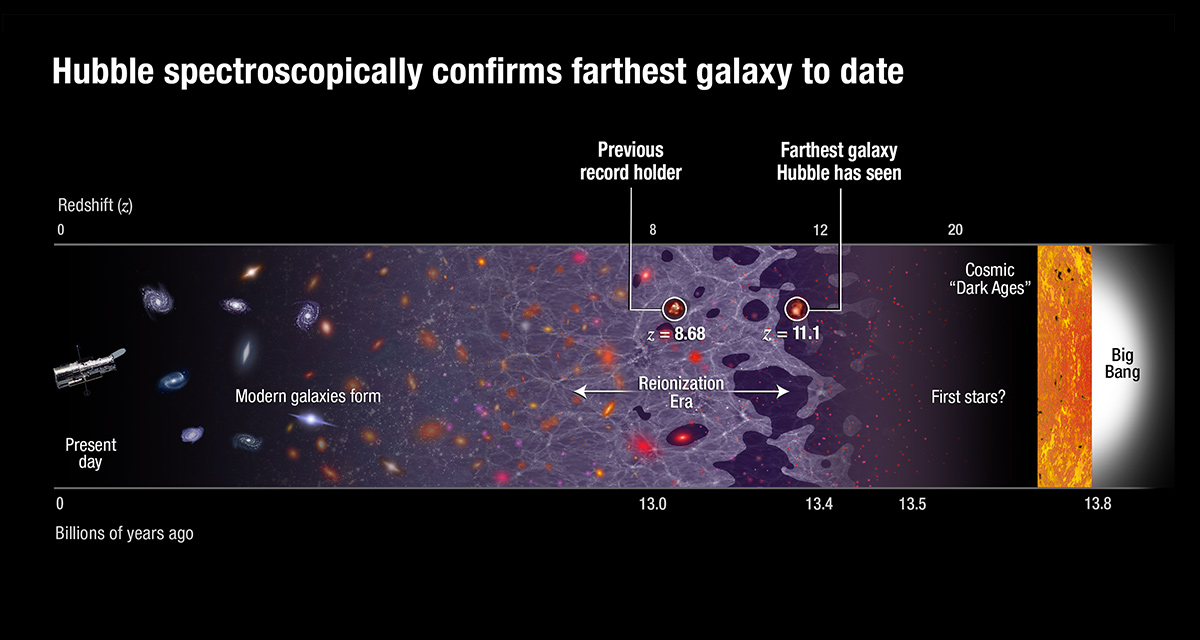
Hubble spectroscopically confirms farthest galaxy to date

In 2026, From an ArXiv Pre-Print astronomers using the JWST confirmed the presence of a strong He II emission from a region designated as Hebe, located approximately 3 kiloparsecs from GN-z11. The He II emission is spectrally resolved into two distinct components (C1 and C2), where C1 region is thought to potential contain Population III stars and C2 region to contain Population II stars. Population III stars scenario is taken into consideration due to absence of metal emission lines while other scenarios have also been taken into consideration like metal-poor Wolf-Rayet stars and Direct collapse black hole or Primordial black hole, but Population III star scenario is thought to be the most likely.

== See also ==
- CEERS-93316
- GLASS-z12
- HD1
- MoM-z14
- List of the most distant astronomical objects

== Notes ==
Records
Preceded by EGSY8p7	Most distant known astronomical object 2016–2022	Succeeded by JADES-GS-z13-0
Preceded by EGSY8p7	Most distant known galaxy 2016–2022	Succeeded by JADES-GS-z13-0
