= HD1 (disambiguation) =

HD1 is a high-redshift galaxy.

HD1 or HD 1 may also refer to:

- HD 1, or HIP 422, a star in the northern circumpolar constellation Cepheus
- Plectin, a giant protein found in mammalian cells, alias HD1
- TF1 Séries Films, formerly known as HD1 (Histoire de)
- Hanriot HD.1, a French aircraft of World War I
- HD-1, a Chinese anti-ship missile
- Austral HD1, an Australian road coach

== See also ==
- HDI (disambiguation)
