= CEERS 1019 =

Early supermassive black hole

Observation data (Epoch J2000.0)
- Constellation: Boötes
- Right ascension: 14^{h} 20^{m} 8.494^{s}
- Declination: +52° 53′ 26″
- Redshift: 8.6788±0.0002

CEERS 1019 is a black hole in the galaxy previously identified as EGSY8p7 or z910_6811 and may be the oldest known black hole as of 2023. The galaxy and its black hole already existed about 570 million years after the Big Bang, and the black hole in the center of CEERS 1019 seems to be less massive than any other black holes identified in the early universe but still larger than black hole growth methods can currently explain.

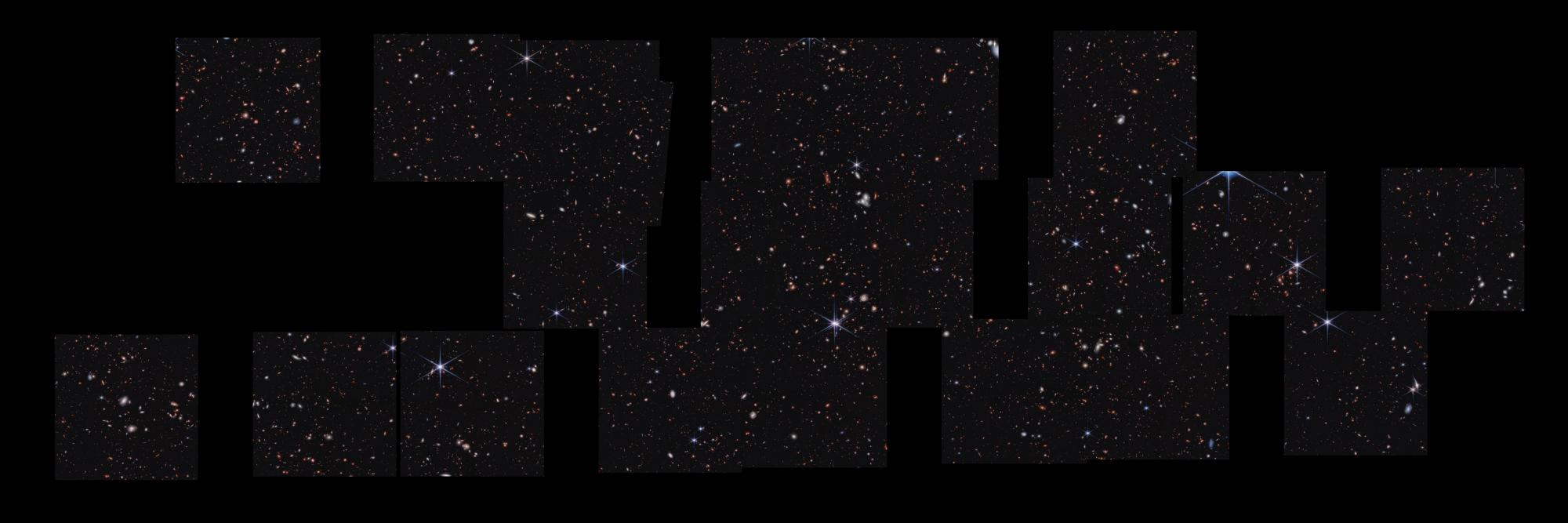
A James Webb Space Telescope image including the supermassive black hole.

The authors of a 2023 preprint describing it state that "We find that it is difficult to explain a SMBH of this mass ... with a stellar seed", i.e. gravitational collapse into a stellar black hole. Its mass is 10^{6.95±0.37} (3.8-21 million) solar masses.

== Nitrogen Excess ==
Subsequent study of CEERS 1019 involved measurement of nitrogen abundance relative to oxygen (a standard reference point for metallicity) using ultraviolet lines emitted by oxygen, O III] 1660, and nitrogen, N IV] 1486 and N III 1750. Other abundances, such as carbon (measured from C III] 1909) follow the trends anticipated from observations of nearby galaxies and from stellar nucleosynthesis models. However, CEERS 1019 exhibits an excess of nitrogen relative to oxygen. This extra nitrogen may be related to very massive stars unique to the early universe and related stellar winds (similar to Wolf-Rayet stars in the nearby universe) actively enriching the ISM. The excess nitrogen in CEERS 1019 is similar to that seen in GN-z11 and may be characteristic of galaxies in the early universe.

== See also ==
- CEERS-93316
- Direct collapse black hole
- List of the most distant astronomical objects
