= GHZ2 =

Lyman-break galaxy that is one of the oldest galaxies known

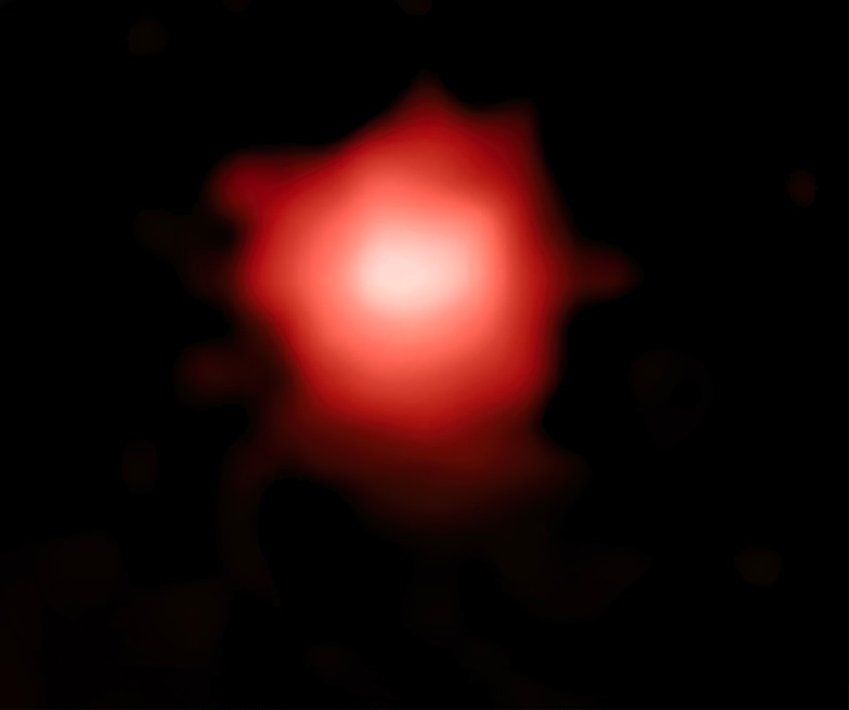
- Close-up view of GLASS-z12 from the James Webb Space Telescope

Observation data (J2000 epoch)
- Constellation: Sculptor
- Right ascension: 00^{h} 13^{m} 59.76^{s}
- Declination: −30° 19′ 29.1″
- Redshift: 12.117±0.012 (spectroscopic); 12.4+0.1 −0.3; 12.42+0.27 −0.14; 12.28+0.08 −0.07
- Distance: ≈32.718 billion ly (10.031 billion pc) (present proper distance); ≈13.4 billion ly (4.1 billion pc) (light-travel distance)
- Apparent magnitude (V): 27.0 AB (F200W)

Characteristics
- Mass: ≈1.0×10^{9} M_{☉}
- Size: ~3000 ly (1 kpc)
- Half-light radius (physical): 500 pc

Other designations
- GHZ2 · GLASS-17487

GHZ2, also named GLASS-z12 (formerly known as GLASS-z13) is a Lyman-break galaxy discovered by the Grism Lens-Amplified Survey from Space (GLASS) observing program using the James Webb Space Telescope's NIRCam in July 2022.

It has a spectroscopic redshift of 12.34, making it one of the most distant galaxies and astronomical objects ever discovered. According to current theory, this redshift corresponds to a time about 13.44 billion years ago, approximately 355 million years after the Big Bang, or about 2.57% of its current age.

== Discovery ==
GLASS-z12/GHZ2, was initially discovered as a robust z ≈ 12.0–12.5 candidate by Castellano et al. and Naidu et al. in the GLASS-JWST Early Release Science NIRCam field. The two discovery papers appeared on arXiv the same day. Hence these two names for this galaxy of GLASS-z12 (Naidu et al. 2022) and GHZ2 (Castellano et al. 2022a).

GLASS-z12 derives its name from the GLASS survey that discovered it and its estimated photometric redshift of approximately z = 12.4+0.1
−0.3. GLASS-z12 was initially announced as GLASS-z13 because it was thought to have a higher redshift of z = 13.1. This redshift value was later revised down to z = 12.4 in October 2022, resulting in the renaming of this galaxy.

It was discovered alongside another galaxy, GLASS-z10, comparable to GN-z11, also one of the oldest galaxies discovered.

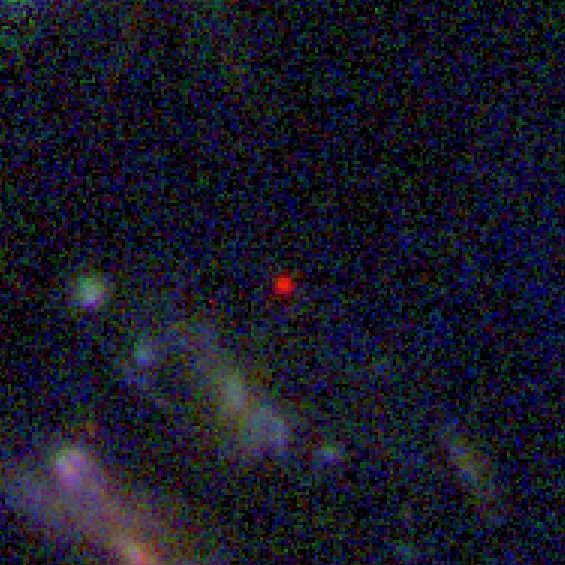
Color composite of JWST-NIRCam images showing GLASS-z12 as a red dot among other galaxies

== Spectroscopy by the Atacama Large Millimeter Array ==
Spectroscopic observations of GLASS-z12 by the Atacama Large Millimeter Array (ALMA) in August 2022 confirmed that the galaxy has a spectroscopic redshift of 12.117±0.012, making it one of the earliest and most distant galaxies ever discovered, dating back to 360 million years after the Big Bang, 13.44 billion years ago. ALMA observations detected an emission line associated with doubly ionized oxygen (O III) at 258.7 GHz with a significance of 5σ, suggesting that there is very low dust content in GLASS-z12, if not the early universe as well. Also based on oxygen-related measurements, the age of the galaxy is confirmed.

GLASS-z12 has a light-travel distance (lookback time) of 13.4 billion years. However, due to the expansion of the universe, its present proper distance is 32.718 billion light-years.

== Spectroscopy by the James Webb Space Telescope ==
This galaxy was observed again in October 2023 by the James Webb Space Telescope with the NIRSpec and MIRI spectrographs, making it the most distant redshift galaxy of z = 12.34 with full spectroscopic coverage from ultraviolet (UV) to optical.

According to current ΛCDM parameters (H_{0} = 67.4, Ω_{m =} 0.315, Ω_{Λ} = 0.685), this redshift of 12.34 corresponds to a light-travel distance (lookback time) of 13.44 billion years. However, due to the expansion of the universe, its comoving distance is 32.837 Gly.

== See also ==
- Earliest galaxies – Subfield of cosmology
- JADES-GS-z14-0 – Lyman-Break galaxy that is one of the oldest known galaxies
- JADES-GS-z13-0 – High-redshift Lyman-break galaxy that is one of the oldest galaxies known
- GN-z11 – High-redshift galaxy in the constellation Ursa Major
- List of the most distant astronomical objects
