= SXDF-NB1006-2 =

Galaxy in the constellation Cetus

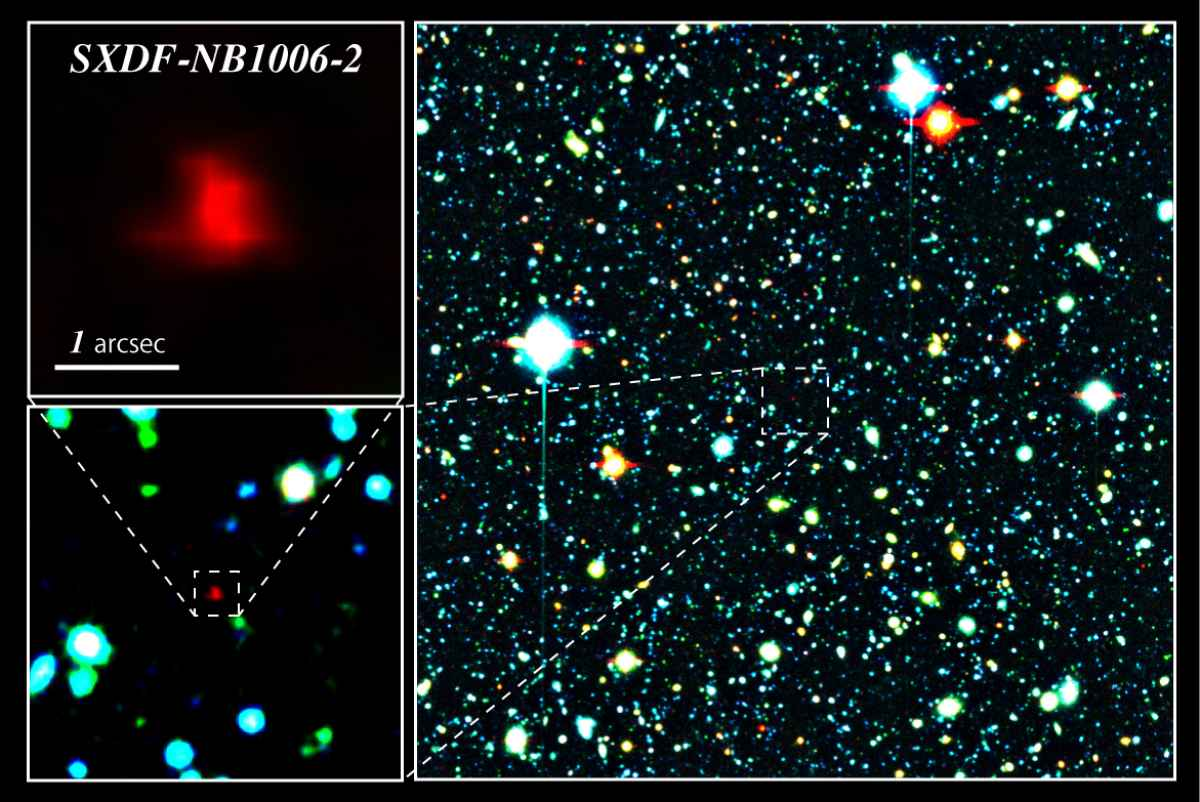
- Image of SXDF-NB1006-2 taken by Subaru XMM-Newton Deep Survey Field.

Observation data (J2000 epoch)
- Constellation: Cetus
- Right ascension: 02^{h} 18^{m} 56.5^{s}
- Declination: −05° 19′ 58.9″
- Redshift: 7.2120±0.0003
- Distance: 12.9 billion light-years (light travel distance); 29 billion light-years (proper distance)

Other designations
- SKO2012 SXDF-NB1006-2

SXDF-NB1006-2 is a distant galaxy located in the constellation Cetus, with a spectroscopic redshift of z = 7.213 or 12.91 billion light-years away. It was discovered by the Subaru XMM-Newton Deep Survey Field. The galaxy was claimed to be the most distant galaxy at announcement in June 2012, as the more distant claimants were not confirmed spectroscopically at the time. It exceeded the previous confirmed distance holder, GN-108036, also discovered by Subaru. Oxygen emission lines have been detected in its spectrum.

== See also ==
- List of the most distant astronomical objects
- z8 GND 5296

Records
Preceded by GN-108036	Most distant galaxy 2012–2013	Succeeded by Z8 GND 5296
