= Z8 GND 5296 =

Dwarf galaxy

z8_GND_5296
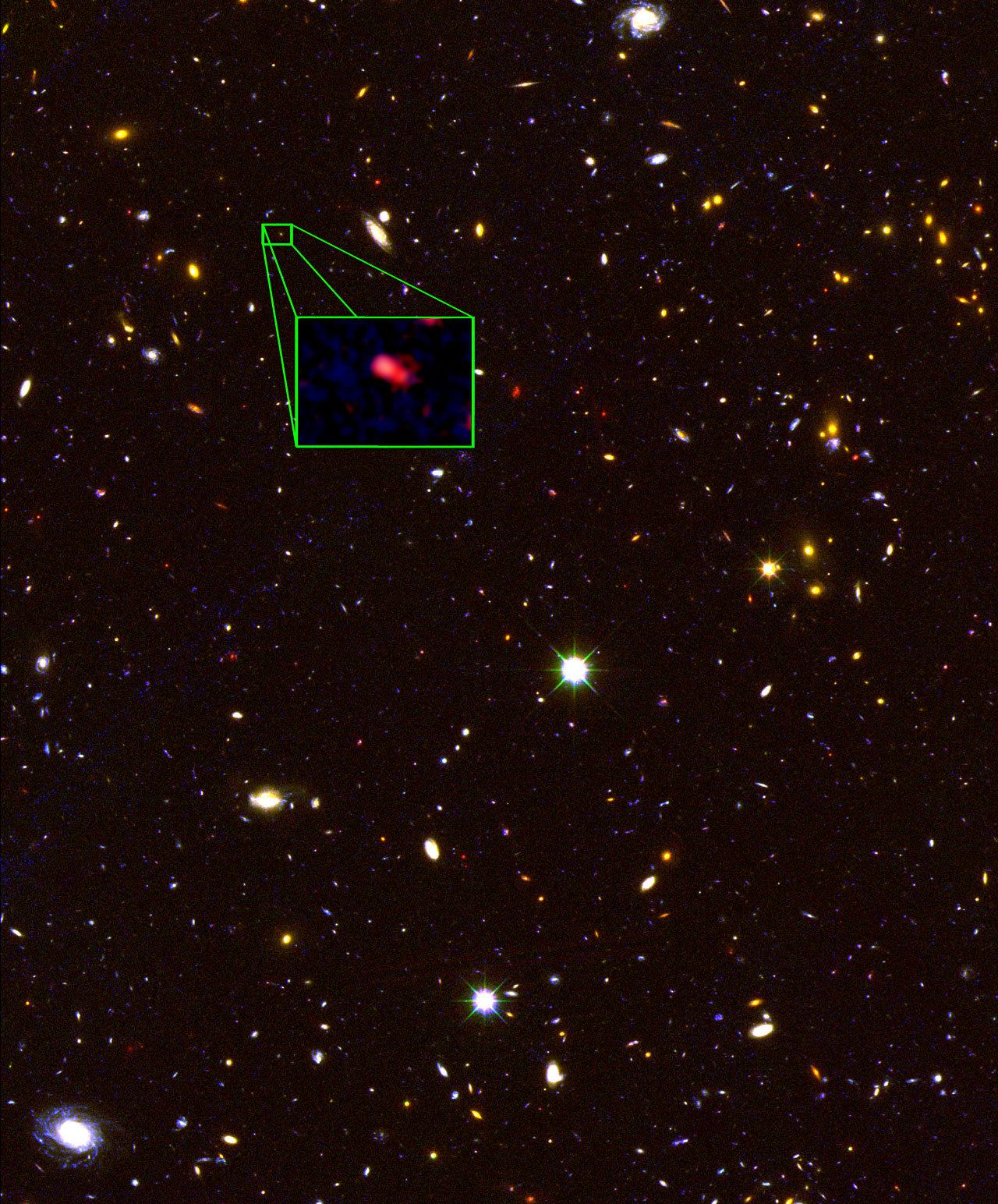
- z8_GND_5296 image from the NASA/ESA Hubble Space Telescope in 2013

Observation data (J2000 epoch)
- Constellation: Ursa Major
- Right ascension: 12^{h} 36^{m} 37.892^{s}
- Declination: +62° 18′ 08.54″
- Redshift: 7.5078±0.0004
- Heliocentric radial velocity: 291622±120 km/s
- Distance: 13.1 billion ly (4.0 billion pc) (light travel distance) ≈30 billion ly (9.2 billion pc) (present comoving distance)
- Apparent magnitude (V): 25.6 (F160W)

Characteristics
- Type: Dwarf
- Mass: 1.0+0.2 −0.1×10^{9} M_{☉}

Other designations
- FIGS GN1 1292, J123637.89+621808.5, z7 GND 42912

z8_GND_5296 is a dwarf galaxy discovered in October 2013 which has the highest redshift that has been confirmed through the Lyman-alpha emission line of hydrogen, placing it among the oldest and most distant known galaxies at approximately 13.1 billion light-years (4.0 Gpc) from Earth. It is "seen as it was at a time just 700 million years after the Big Bang [...] when the universe was only about 5 percent of its current age of 13.8 billion years". The galaxy is at a redshift of 7.51, and it is a neighbour to what was announced then as the second-most distant galaxy with a redshift of 7.2. The galaxy in its observable timeframe was producing stars at a phenomenal rate, equivalent in mass to about 330 Suns per year.

The light reaching Earth from z8_GND_5296 shows its position over 13 billion years ago, having traveled a distance of more than 13 billion light-years. Due to the expansion of the universe, this position is now at about 30 billion light-years (9.2 Gpc) (comoving distance) from Earth.

== Discovery ==
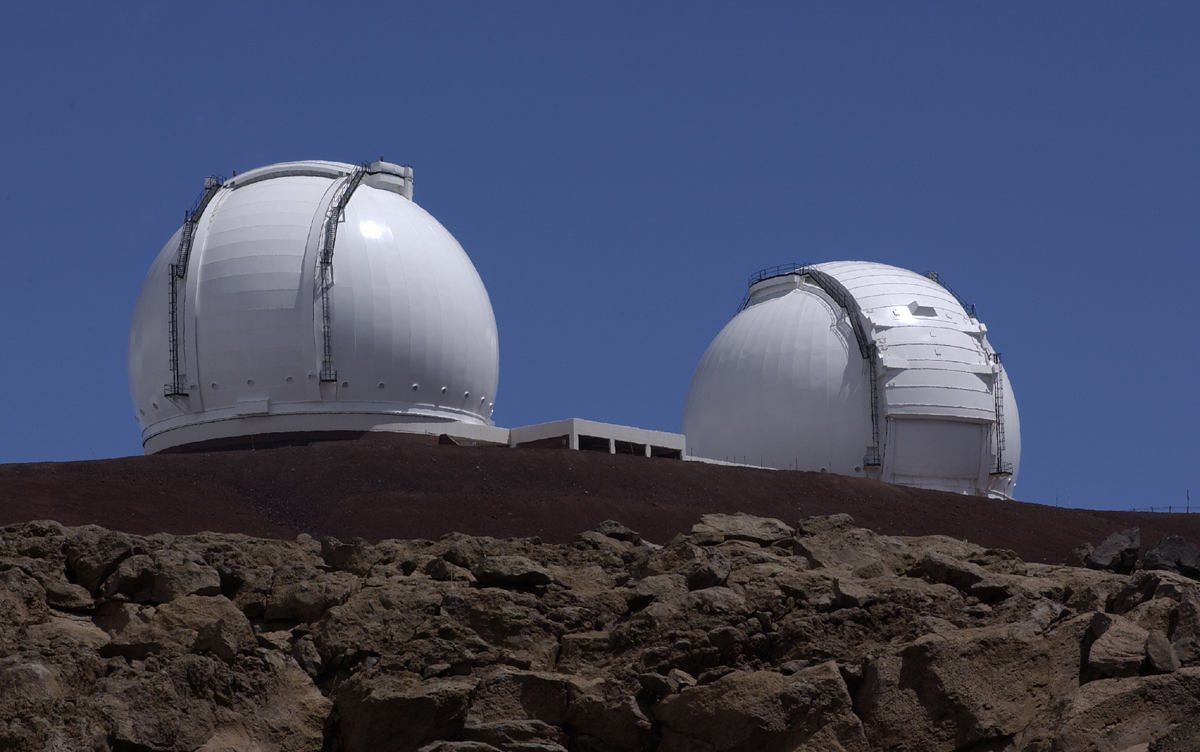
W. M. Keck Observatory atop Mauna Kea in Hawaii

Research published in the 24 October 2013 issue of the journal Nature by a team of astronomers from the University of Texas at Austin led by Steven Finkelstein, in collaboration with astronomers at the Texas A&M University, the National Optical Astronomy Observatory and University of California, Riverside, describes the discovery of the most distant galaxy known using deep optical and infrared images taken by the Hubble Space Telescope. Their discovery was confirmed by the W. M. Keck Observatory in Hawaii. MOSFIRE, a new instrument at the Keck Observatory that is extremely sensitive to infrared light, proved instrumental to this finding.

To measure galaxies at such large distances with definitive evidence, astronomers use spectroscopy and the phenomenon of redshift. Redshift occurs whenever a light source moves away from an observer. Astronomical redshift is seen due to the expansion of the universe, and sufficiently distant light sources (generally more than a few million light-years away) show redshift corresponding to the rate of increase in their distance from Earth. The redshift observed in astronomy can be measured because the emission and absorption spectra for atoms are distinctive and well known, calibrated from spectroscopic experiments in laboratories on Earth.

== See also ==
- Galactic orientation
- List of the most distant astronomical objects
- Luminous infrared galaxy
- Expansion of the universe
- Observable universe
- Timeline of knowledge about galaxies, clusters of galaxies, and large-scale structure

Records
Preceded by SXDF-NB1006-2	Most distant galaxy 2013–2015	Succeeded by EGS-zs8-1
