= HDI (disambiguation) =

The Human Development Index is a United Nations measure of well-being in a country.

HDI may also refer to:

- PSA HDi engine, a diesel automobile engine by Peugeot/Citroën
- Hexamethylene diisocyanate, an organic compound used to make polymers such as polyurethane
- HDi Interactive Format (formerly iHD), a trademark for Microsoft's implementation of advanced interactivity for HD DVD
- Histone deacetylase inhibitor, compounds used in psychiatry and neurology, and with anticancer potential
- HDI-30 connector, an external SCSI connector by Apple
- HDI-45 connector, a video connector by Apple
- Heroux-Devtek Inc., a manufacturer of aircraft undercarriages
- Hdi language of Cameroon and Nigeria
- HDI-Arena, a sports stadium in Hanover, Germany

== See also ==
- HD1 (disambiguation)
