= JADES-GS-z14-0 =

Lyman-Break galaxy that is one of the oldest known galaxies

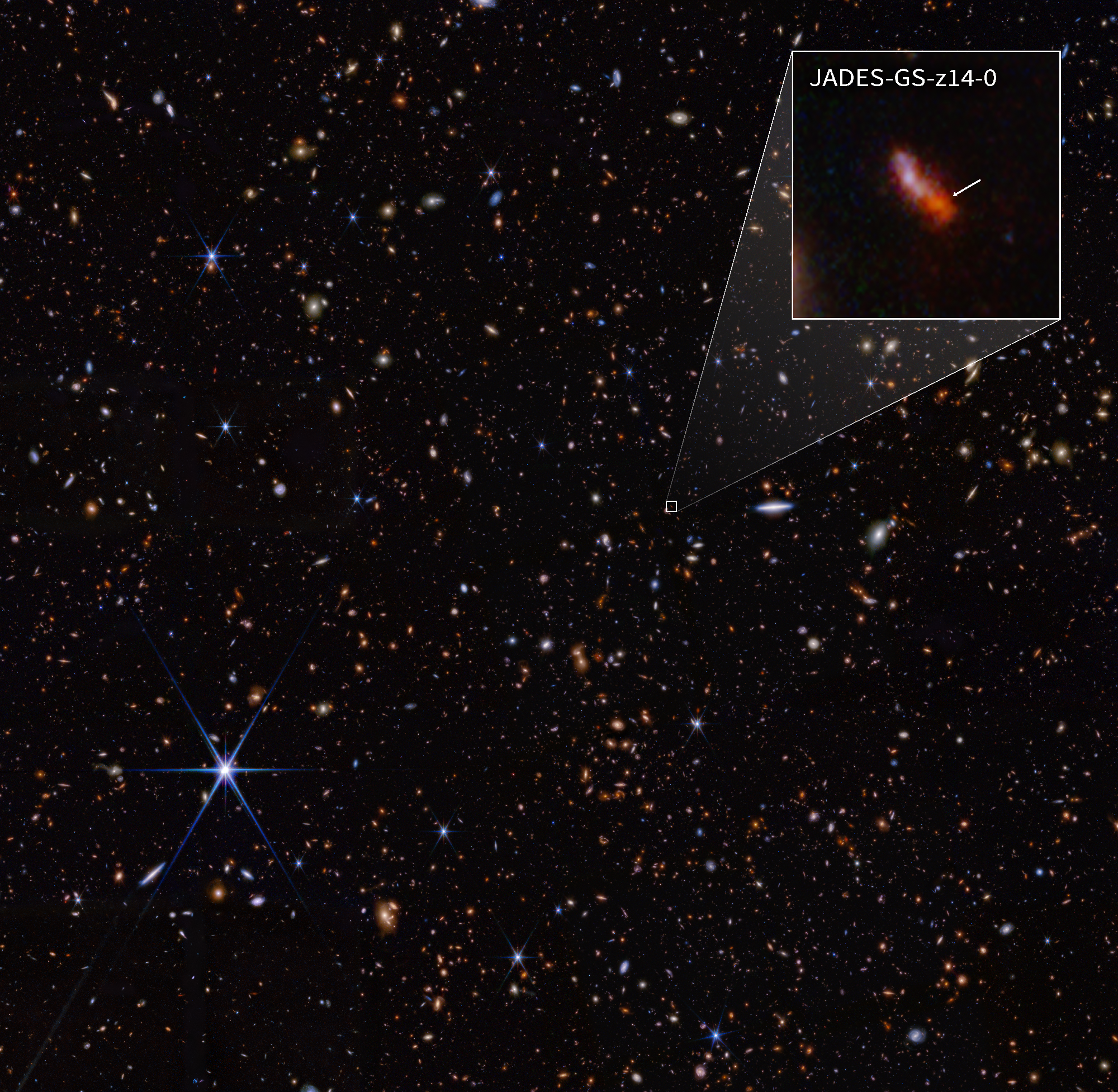
- JADES-GS-z14-0 appears as a red blob highlighted by an arrow in this image by NIRCam. The white object at its upper left is a foreground galaxy designated as NIRCam ID 183349 at z = 3.475.

Observation data (J2000 epoch)
- Constellation: Fornax
- Right ascension: 03^{h} 32^{m} 19.905^{s}
- Declination: −27° 51′ 20.27″
- Redshift: 14.1793±0.0007
- Distance: 13.428 billion light-years (light travel distance); 33.844 billion light-years (present proper distance)

Characteristics
- Type: Lyman-break galaxy
- Half-light radius (physical): 260 ± 20 pc
- Half-light radius (apparent): 0.079 arcsec

JADES-GS-z14-0 is a high-redshift Lyman-Break galaxy in the constellation Fornax that was discovered in 2024 using NIRCam as part of the James Webb Space Telescope Advanced Deep Extragalactic Survey (JADES) program. It has a redshift of about 14.18, making it one of the most distant galaxies and astronomical objects ever discovered. According to current theory, this redshift corresponds to a time about 13.5 billion years ago, approximately 300 million years after the Big Bang, or about 2% of its current age.

== Discovery ==
JADES-GS-z14-0 was observed using the James Webb Space Telescope's Near-Infrared Spectrograph (NIRSpec) in 2024, and it measured a redshift of 14.32. Its age, size, and luminosity added to a growing body of evidence that current theories of early star and galaxy formation are incomplete.

A larger study using JWST NIRCam "Earliest Galaxies in the JADES Origins Field: Luminosity Function and Cosmic Star Formation Rate Density 300 Myr after the Big Bang" (Robertson et al. 2024) gave JADES-GS-z14-0 a photometric redshift of z = 14.39+0.23
−0.09.

== Characteristics ==
JADES-GS-z14-0 is 1,600 light years (ly) wide and very luminous. Spectroscopic analysis revealed the presence of strong ionized gas emissions, including hydrogen and oxygen.

== Further observations ==
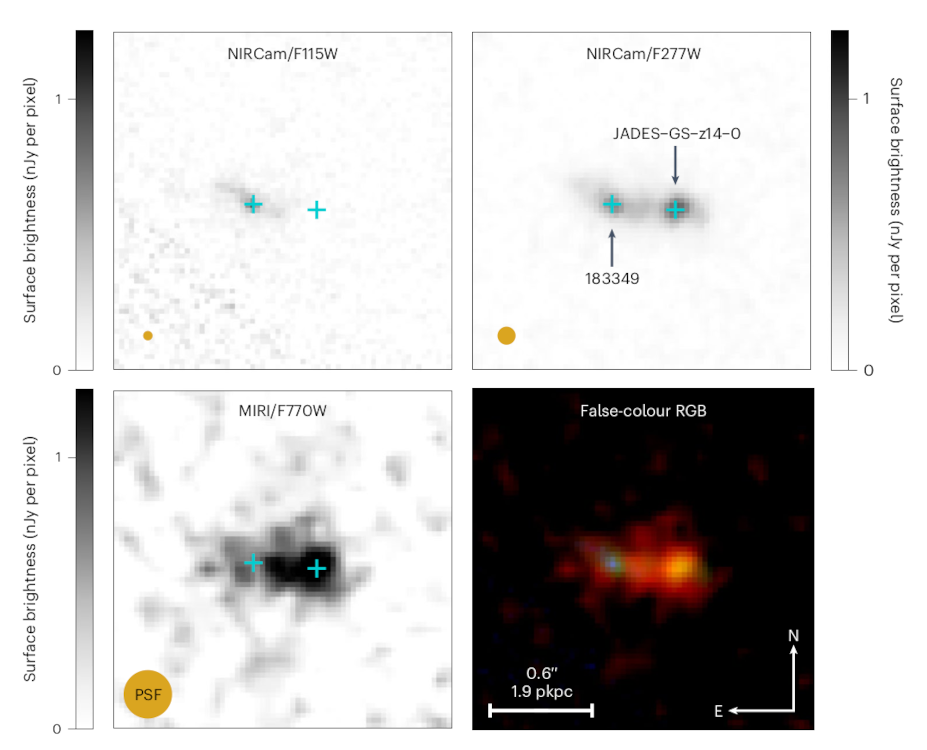
A 2025 composite showing observations from James Webb Space Telescope's MIRI and NIRCam

The initial identification of JADES-GS-z14-0 came from imaging data obtained with JWST’s Near-Infrared Camera (NIRCam). The high-redshift hypothesis was confirmed through multiple spectroscopic observations with NIRSpec. Additionally, observations using JWST's Mid-Infrared Instrument (MIRI) detected the galaxy at longer wavelengths, which support the extreme distance at which JADES-GS-z14-0 is located.

In March 2025, the study "Photometric detection at 7.7 μm of a galaxy beyond redshift 14 with JWST/MIRI" (Helton et al. 2025) was published which described JWST observations of JADES-GS-z14-0 that had used MIRI and NIRCam. MIRI observes at longer optical wavelengths, which lead to stronger rest-frame emission lines that are highly diagnostic and accessible at mid-infrared wavelengths. The study outlines the theory that JADES-GS-z14-0 contained half a billion solar masses, with strong star formation in the previous few million of years. Quoting: "The properties of JADES-GS-z14-0 add to the evidence that a population of luminous and massive galaxies was already in place less than 300 Myr after the Big Bang, with number densities more than ten times higher than extrapolations based on pre-JWST observations."

In May 2025, the JWST detected MoM-z14, an even more distant galaxy with a redshift of z = 14.44.

== Discovery of oxygen ==
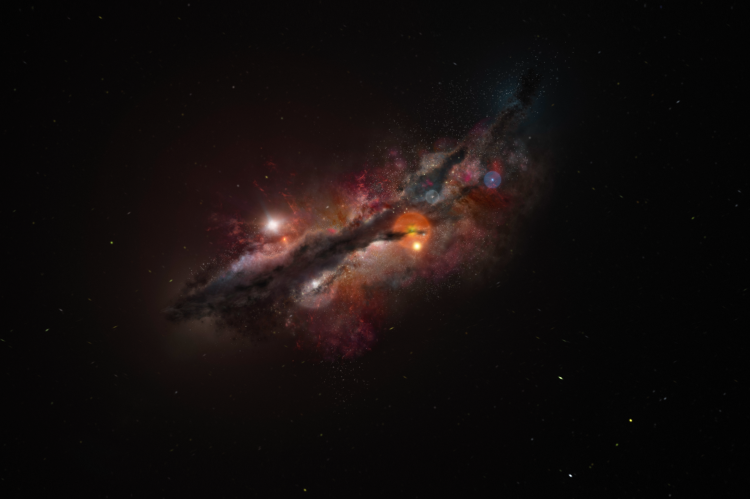
This is an artist’s impression of JADES-GS-z14-0 from the European Southern Observatory website.

In March 2025, astronomers reported the detection of oxygen in JADES-GS-z14-0, marking the most distant observation of this element to date. This discovery was achieved using the Atacama Large Millimeter/submillimeter Array (ALMA) in Chile's Atacama Desert. The presence of oxygen suggests that the galaxy underwent rapid formation and chemical maturation, challenging previous assumptions about the timeline of heavy element production in the early Universe.

The detection of oxygen also allowed for a more precise measurement of the galaxy's distance, with an uncertainty of just 0.005%.

The two associated studies by S. Carniani et al. (2025) and S. Schouws et al. (2025) give a spectroscopic redshift of z = 14.1793±0.0007 using ALMA, which is consistent with the tentative detection by S. Carniani et al. (2024) of carbon at redshift z = 14.178±0.013 using JWST. It therefore appears to have a redshift of about 14.18.

== See also ==
- JADES-GS-z13-0, the former record-holder for farthest galaxy
- List of the most distant astronomical objects

Records
Preceded by JADES-GS-z13-0	Most distant known astronomical object 2024–2025	Succeeded by MoM-z14
Preceded by JADES-GS-z13-0	Most distant known galaxy 2024–2025	Succeeded by MoM-z14
