= GN-108036 =

Galaxy in the constellation Ursa Major

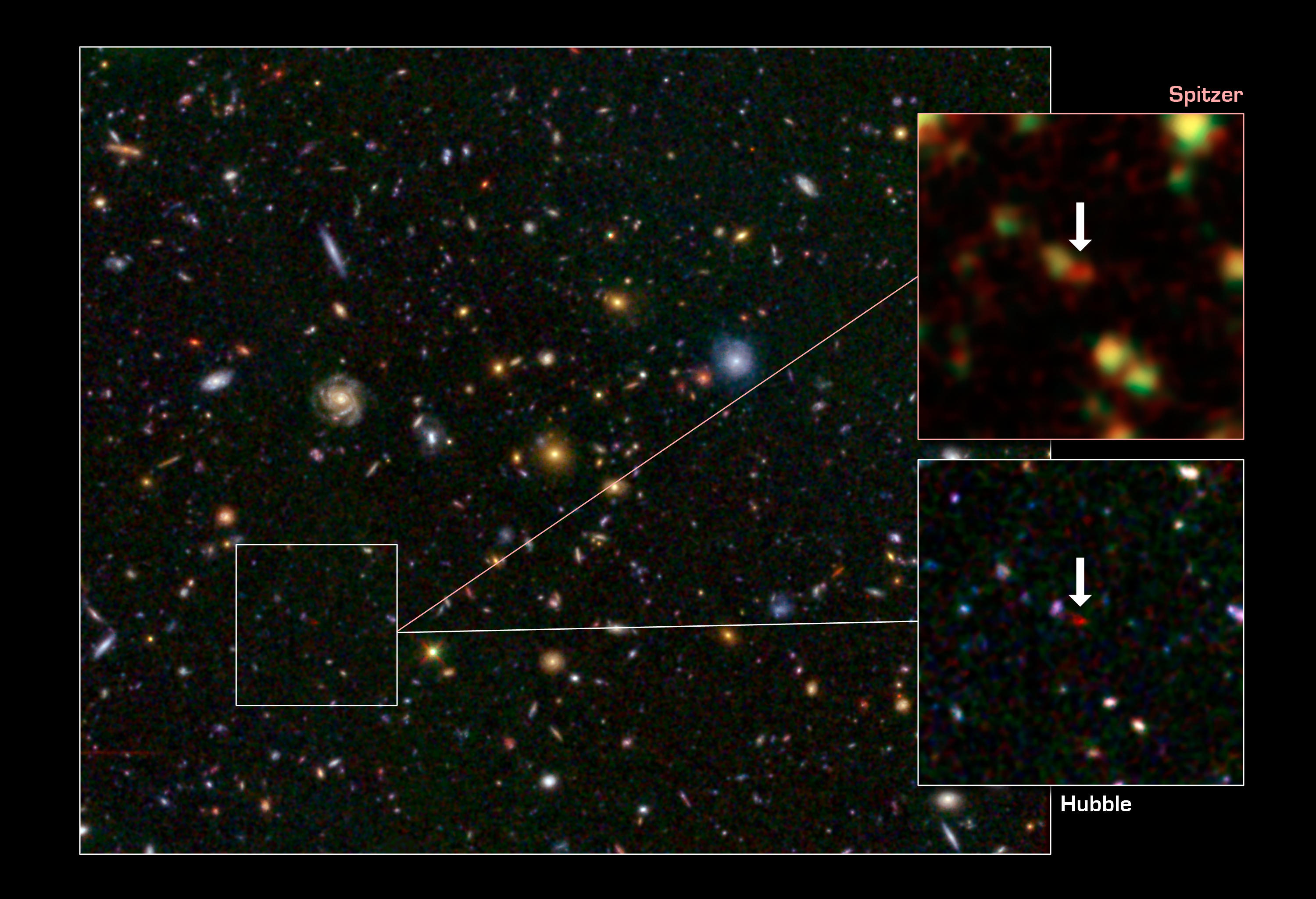
- Hubble and Spitzer Space Telescope images of GN-108036

Observation data (J2000 epoch)
- Constellation: Ursa Major
- Right ascension: 12^{h} 36^{m} 22.68^{s}
- Declination: +62° 08′ 07.5″
- Redshift: 7.2
- Heliocentric radial velocity: 2,162,403 km/s
- Distance: 12.9 billion ly (4.0 billion pc) (light travel distance); 29 billion ly (8.9 billion pc) (present proper distance)
- Apparent magnitude (V): 25.2J

Characteristics
- Type: Irr
- Size: 5,000 ly (diameter)
- Apparent size (V): 0.0013 x 0.0006

Other designations
- OOM2012 GN 108036, FRP2015 z7 GNW 4703, HRG14 J123622.69+620807.9

GN-108036 is a distant galaxy discovered and confirmed by the Subaru Telescope and the Keck Observatory located in Hawaii; its study was also completed by the Hubble Space Telescope and the Spitzer Space Telescope.

== Description ==
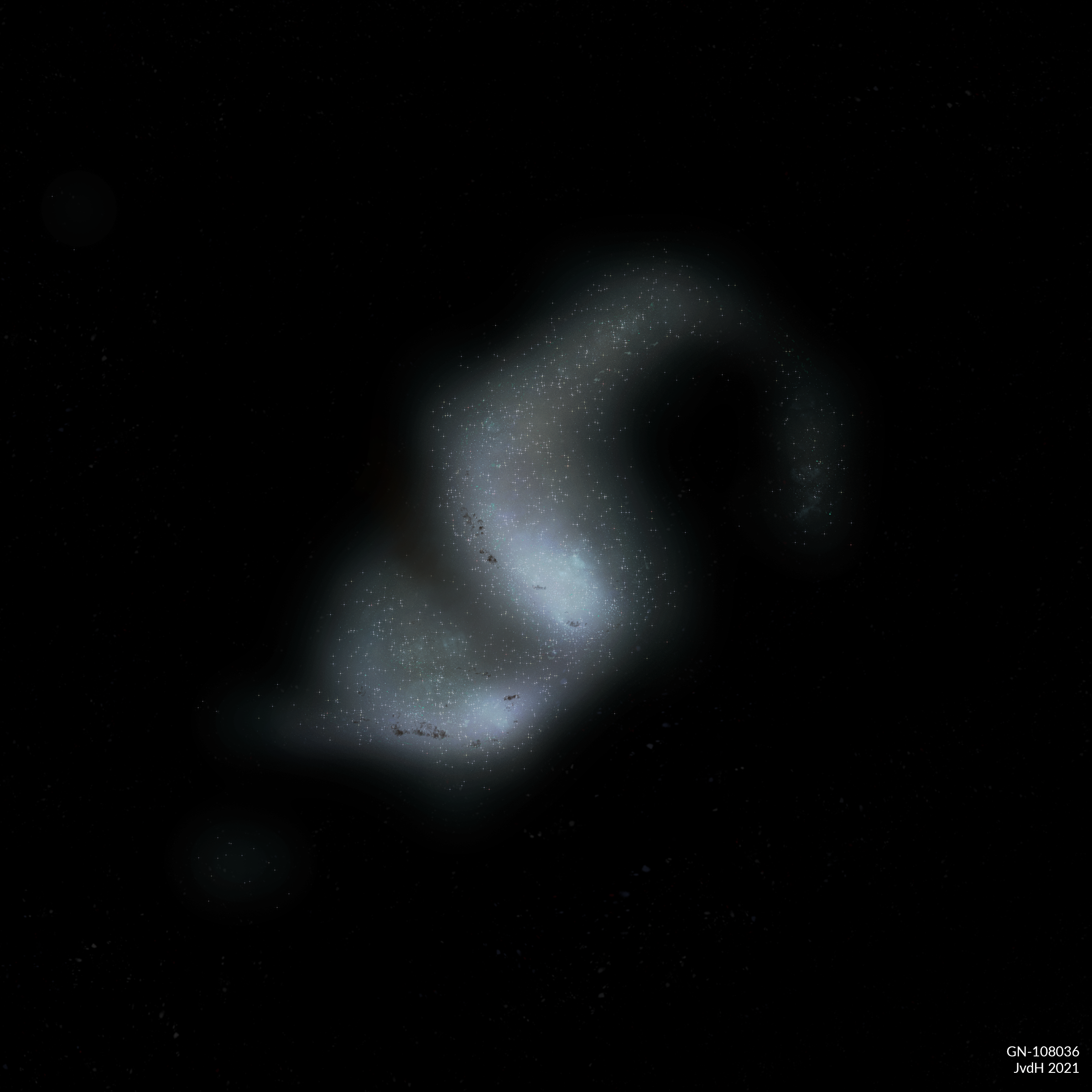
Artist's impression of GN-108036

The redshift was z = 7.2, meaning the light of the galaxy took nearly 13 billion years to reach Earth and therefore its formation dates back to 750 million years after the Big Bang. It has a high rate of star formation, at a rate of 100 solar masses per year, or about 30 times more than the Milky Way that is 5 times larger and 100 times more massive.

== See also ==
- List of the most distant astronomical objects

Records
Preceded by BDF-3299	Most distant galaxy 2012	Succeeded by SXDF-NB1006-2
