= BDF-3299 =

Galaxy in the constellation Piscis Austrinus

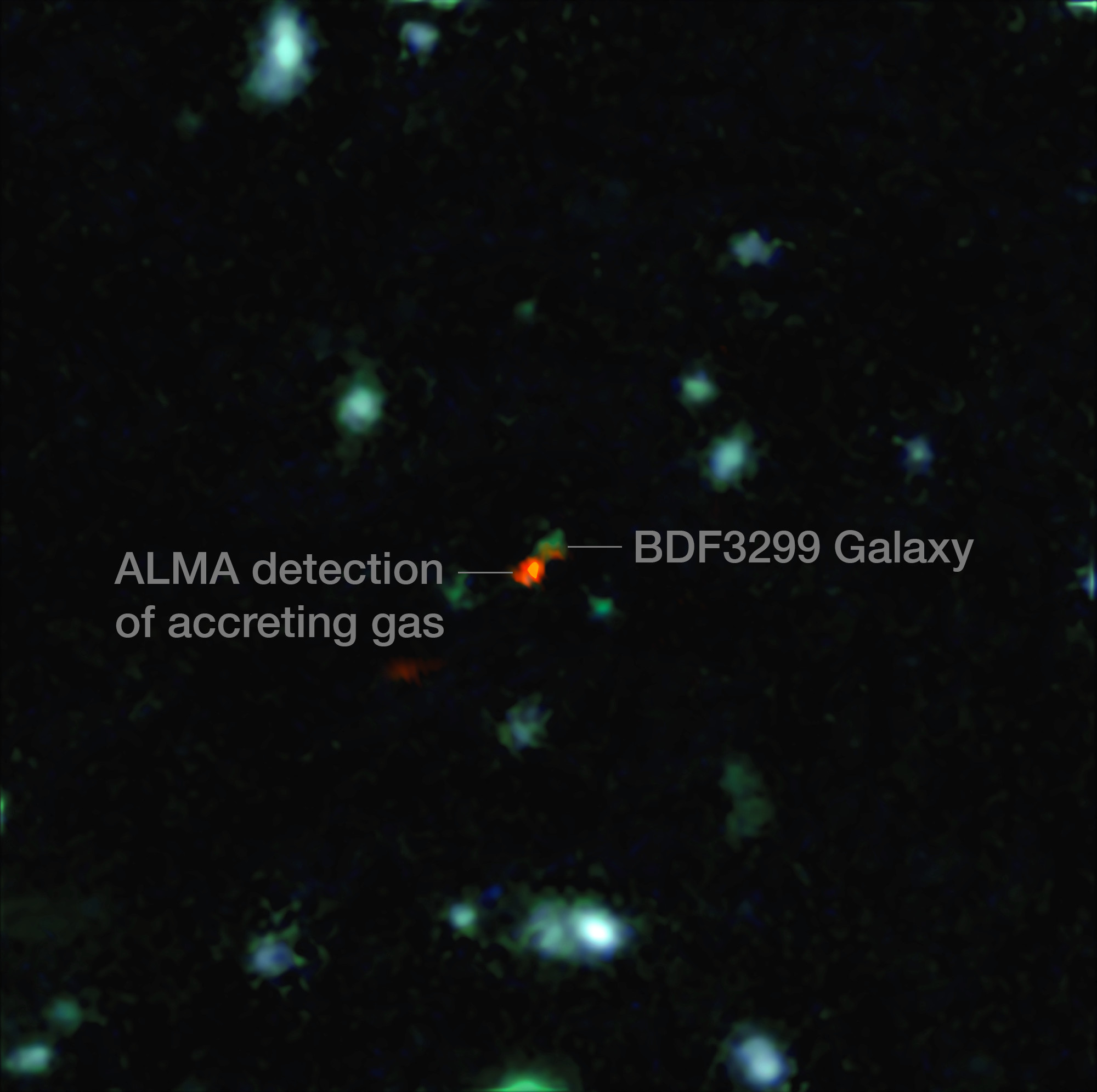

Observation data (J2000 epoch)
- Constellation: Piscis Austrinus
- Right ascension: 22^{h} 28^{m} 12.26^{s}
- Declination: −35° 09′ 59.4″
- Redshift: 7.109
- Distance: 12.9 billion light-years (light travel distance); 28.25 billion light years (present proper distance)
- Apparent magnitude (V): 26.1

Other designations
- CFP2010 BDF 3299

BDF-3299 is a remote galaxy with a redshift of z = 7.109 corresponds to a distance traveled by light to come down to Earth of 12.9 billion light-years.

== See also ==
- List of most distant galaxies
- List of the most distant astronomical objects

== Sources ==
- Vanzella; et al. (2011). "Spectroscopic Confirmation of Two Lyman Break Galaxies at Redshift Beyond 7". The Astrophysical Journal Letters. 730 (2): L35. arXiv:1011.5500. Bibcode:2011ApJ...730L..35V. doi:10.1088/2041-8205/730/2/L35. S2CID 53459241.

Records
Preceded by UDFj-39546284	Most distant galaxy known 2012	Succeeded by GN-108036
