= EGS-zs8-1 =

High-redshift Lyman-break galaxy

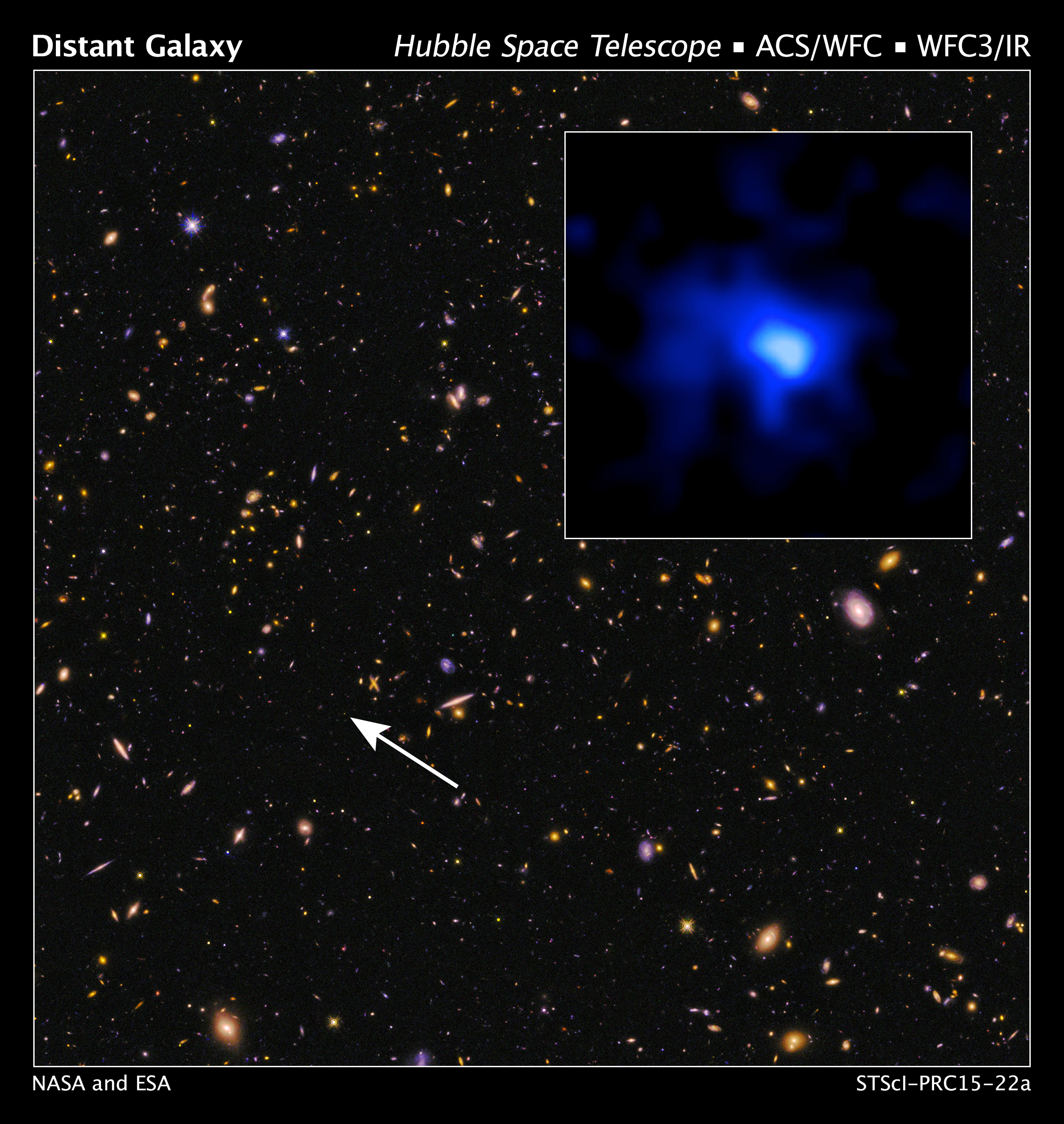
- EGS-zs8-1 viewed by the Hubble Space Telescope

Observation data (J2000 epoch)
- Constellation: Boötes
- Right ascension: 14^{h} 20^{m} 34.89^{s}
- Declination: +53° 00′ 15.4″
- Redshift: 7.7
- Heliocentric radial velocity: 2,098,548 km/s (1,303,977 mi/s)
- Galactocentric velocity: 2,098,671 km/s (1,304,054 mi/s)
- Distance: 13.1 billion ly (4.0 billion pc) (light travel distance); 29.5 billion ly (9.0 billion pc) (comoving distance)
- Apparent magnitude (V): 25.3J

Characteristics
- Type: Lyman-break galaxy
- Mass: 8×10^{9} M_{☉}
- Size: 15 kly (diameter)
- Apparent size (V): 0.004 x 0.0018

Other designations
- GCF2012 8053, CANDELS J142034.88+530015.1, SSTSL2 J142034.90+530015.1, SYM2017 9104

EGS-zs8-1 is a high-redshift Lyman-break galaxy found at the northern constellation of Boötes. In May 2015, EGS-zs8-1 had the highest spectroscopic redshift of any known galaxy, meaning EGS-zs8-1 was the most distant and the oldest galaxy observed. In July 2015, EGS-zs8-1 was surpassed by EGSY8p7 (EGSY-2008532660).

== Description ==
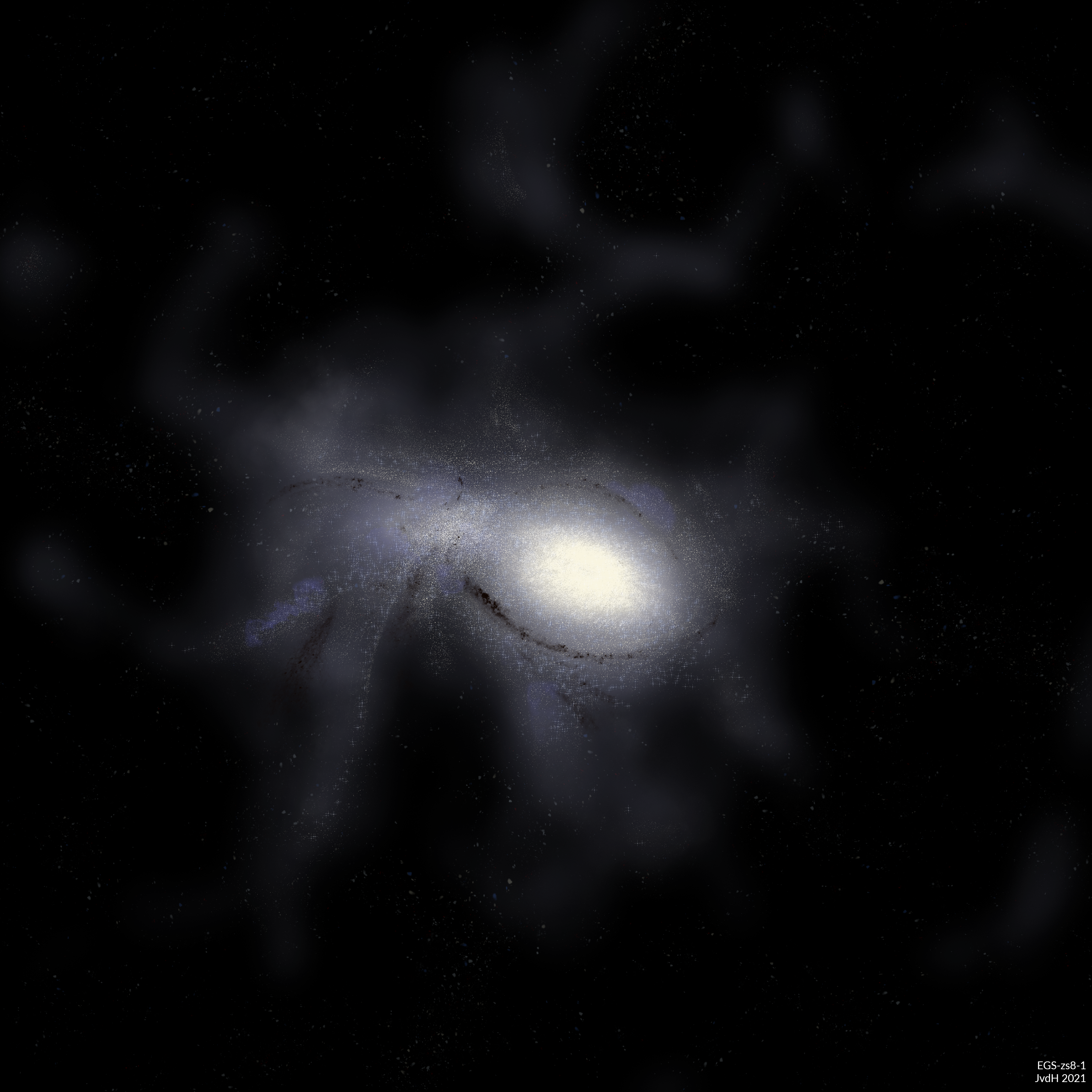
Artist's impression of EGS-zs8-1

The redshift of EGS-zs8-1 was measured at z = 7.73, corresponding to a light travel distance of about 13.040 billion light years from Earth, and age of 13.04 billion years. The galaxy shows a high rate of star formation, so it releases its peak radiation at the vacuum ultraviolet part of the electromagnetic spectrum, near the 121.567 nm (1,215.67 Å) Lyman-alpha emission line due to the intense radiation from newly formed blue stars, hence it is classified as a Lyman-break galaxy; high-redshift starburst galaxies emitting the Lyman-alpha emission line. Because of the cosmological redshift effect caused by the expansion of the universe, the peak light from the galaxy has become redshifted and has moved into the infrared part of the electromagnetic spectrum. The galaxy has a comoving distance of about 30 billion light years from Earth.

EGS-zs8-1 was born 670 million years after the Big Bang, during the period of reionization, and it's 15 percent the size of the Milky Way. The galaxy was found to be larger than its other neighbors in that period when the universe was still very young. Its mass at the time the light was emitted is estimated to have been about 15% of the Milky Way's current mass. The galaxy was making new stars at roughly 80 times the rate of the current Milky Way, or equivalent to 800 M_{☉} worth of material turning to stars every year. The light reaching Earth was made by stars in EGS-zs8-1 that were 100 million to 300 million years old at the time they emitted the light. The age of EGS-zs8-1 places it in the reionization phase of creation, a time when hydrogen outside the galaxies was switching from a neutral to ionized state. According to the galaxy's discoverers, EGS-zs8-1 and other early galaxies were likely the causes of reionization.

== Discovery ==
In 2013, Yale astronomer Pascal Oesch spotted an unexpected bright object while looking at Hubble Space Telescope images. He then confirmed the existence of the object using the Spitzer Space Telescope. Redshift calculations, using the Multi-Object Spectrometer for Infrared Exploration (MOSFIRE) equipment at the W.M. Keck Observatory in Hawaii, were then performed to precisely determine the age of the galaxy. Oesch and his colleagues at Yale and the University of California, Santa Cruz announced the find, which was named EGS-zs8-1, in May 2015 surpassing the previous record for oldest galaxy by about 30 million years.

== See also ==
Records
Preceded by Z8 GND 5296	Most distant galaxy 2015	Succeeded by EGSY8p7
