= HD1 =

High-redshift galaxy in the constellation Sextans

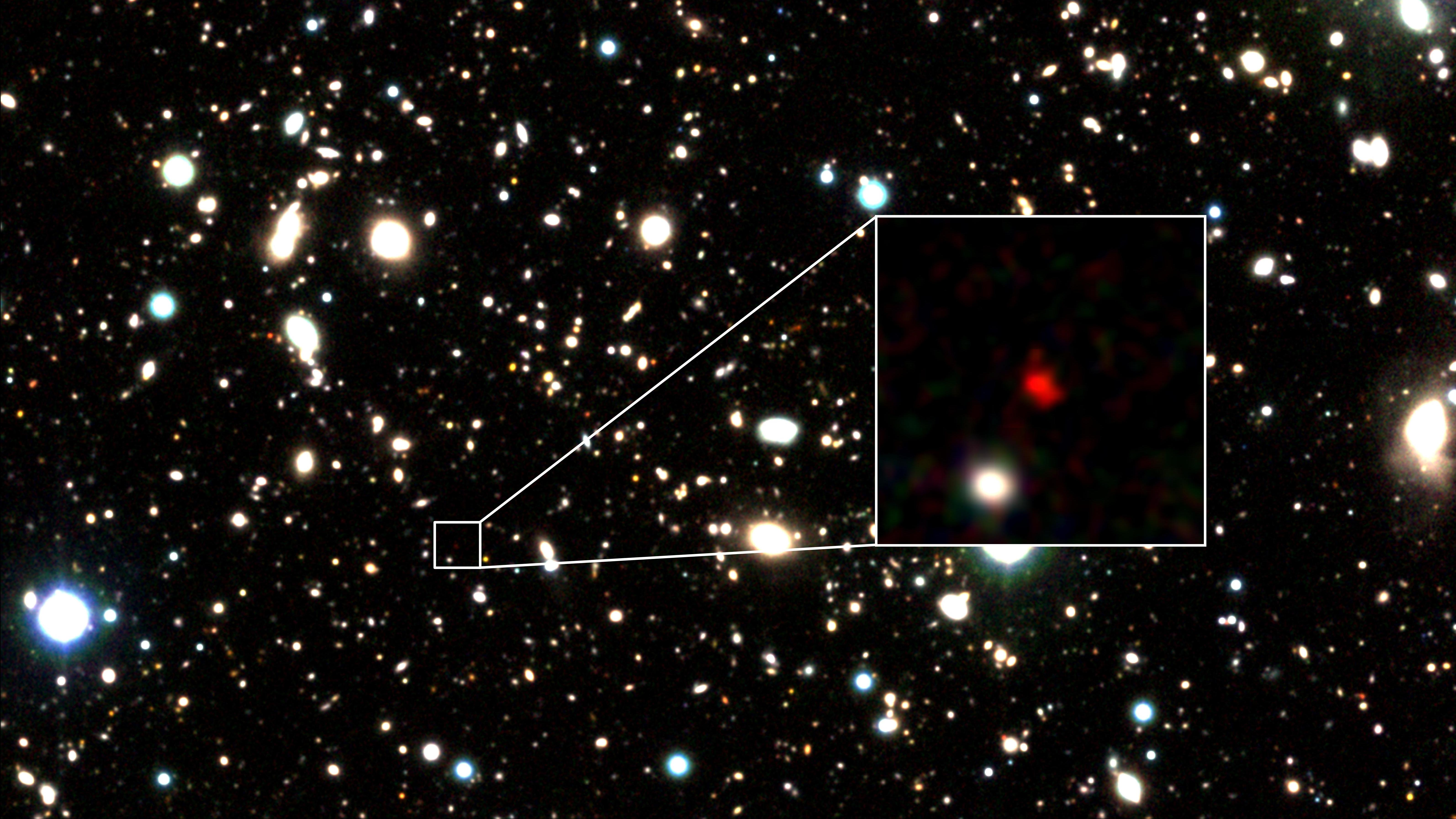
- Three-color image of HD1, the most distant galaxy candidate to date, created using data from the VISTA telescope in Paranal Observatory. The red object in the center of the zoom-in image is HD1.

Observation data (J2000 epoch)
- Constellation: Sextans
- Right ascension: 10^{h} 01^{m} 51.31^{s}
- Declination: +02° 32′ 50.0″
- Redshift: 4.0

Other designations
- [HIM2022] HD1

HD1 is a high-redshift galaxy, which was once a candidate for the most distant known galaxies yet identified in the observable universe. From early data the redshift was estimated of approximately z=13. Followup James Webb Space Telescope spectroscopy found it to be an interloper, and is in fact a passive galaxy at a much lower redshift (z = 4.0).

== Discovery ==
The discovery of HD1 (RA:10:01:51.31 DEC:+02:32:50.0) in the constellation Sextans, along with another high-redshift galaxy, HD2 (RA:02:18:52.44 DEC:-05:08:36.1) in the constellation Cetus, was reported by astronomers at the University of Tokyo on 7 April 2022. These two galaxies were found in two patches of sky surveyed by the Cosmic Evolution Survey and by the Subaru Telescope in the Subaru/XMM-Newton Deep Survey Field respectively. They were found by looking for objects that are much brighter in the so-called K band of infrared than in the H band (around 1.6 microns), which could indicate a Lyman-break galaxy red-shifted by a factor of around 13. In LBG searches, much lower redshift galaxies with Balmer breaks can be misidentified as higher redshift LBGs. As was the case for HD1 and HD2. For this reason they were named "HD 1" and "HD 2" (for "H band dropout", not to be confused with stars HD 1 and HD 2 in the Henry Draper Catalog.

== See also ==
- CEERS-93316
- Earliest galaxies
- GLASS-z12
- List of galaxies
- List of the most distant astronomical objects
