= Data conditioning =

Use of data management techniques in a computer system

Data conditioning is the use of data management and optimization techniques which result in the intelligent routing, optimization and protection of data for storage or data movement in a computer system. Data conditioning features enable enterprise and cloud data centers to dramatically improve system utilization and increase application performance lowering both capital expenditures and operating costs.

Data conditioning technologies delivered through a Data Conditioning Platform optimize data as it moves through a computer’s I/O (Input/Output) path or I/O bus—the data path between the main processor complex and storage subsystems. The functions of a Data Conditioning Platform typically reside on a storage controller add-in card inserted into the PCI-e slots of a server. This enables easy integration of new features in a server or a whole data center.

Data conditioning features delivered via a Data Conditioning Platform are designed to simplify system integration, and minimize implementation risks associated with deploying new technologies by ensuring seamless compatibility with all leading server and storage hardware, operating systems and applications, and meeting all current commercial/off-the-shelf (COTS) standards. By delivering optimization features via a Data Conditioning Platform, data center managers can improve system efficiency and reduce cost with minimal disruption and avoid the need to modify existing applications or operating systems, and leverage existing hardware systems.

== Summary ==
Data conditioning builds on existing data storage functionality delivered in the I/O path including RAID (Redundant Arrays of Inexpensive Disks), intelligent I/O-based power management, and SSD (Solid-State Drive) performance caching techniques. Data conditioning is enabled both by advanced ASIC controller technology and intelligent software. New data conditioning capabilities can be designed into and delivered via storage controllers in the I/O path or to achieve the data center's technical and business goals.

Data Conditioning strategies can also be applied to improving server and storage utilization and for better managing a wide range of hardware and system-level capabilities.

== Background and Purpose ==
Data conditioning principles can be applied to any demanding computing environment to create significant cost, performance and system utilization efficiencies, and are typically deployed by data center managers, system integrators, and storage and server OEMs seeking to optimize hardware and software utilization, simplified, non-intrusive technology integration, and minimal risks and performance hits traditionally associated with incorporating new data center technologies.
