= HD 1 =

First star in the Henry Draper catalogue

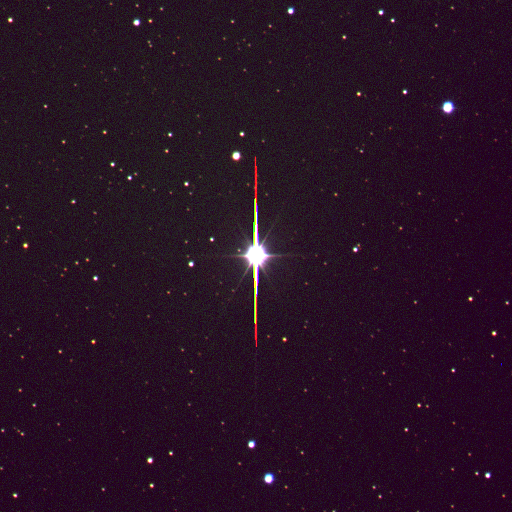
- HD 1 is the bright star in the middle

Observation data Epoch J2000.0 Equinox ICRS
- Constellation: Cepheus
- Right ascension: 00^{h} 05^{m} 08.84054^{s}
- Declination: +67° 50′ 23.9805″
- Apparent magnitude (V): 7.42±0.01

Characteristics
- Evolutionary stage: Red-giant branch
- Spectral type: G9-K0 IIIa

Astrometry
Radial velocity (R_{v})	−30.177±0.007 km/s
Proper motion (μ)	RA: +7.480 mas/yr Dec.: −5.045 mas/yr
Parallax (π)	2.668±0.0485 mas
Distance	1,220 ± 20 ly (375 ± 7 pc)
Absolute magnitude (M_{V})	−0.73±0.03

Orbit
Period (P)	6.3483±0.0030 yr
Semi-major axis (a)	≥0.817±0.0027 AU
Eccentricity (e)	0.503±0.002
Periastron epoch (T)	2,450,000 + 2,317.8±1.1 JD
Argument of periastron (ω) (secondary)	221.0±0.4°
Semi-amplitude (K_{1}) (primary)	4.435±0.013 km/s

Details
Mass	3.5±0.1 M_{☉}
Radius	20.7±0.3 R_{☉}
Luminosity	217±6 L_{☉}
Surface gravity (log g)	2.18±0.13 cgs
Temperature	4,882±36 K
Metallicity	$\begin{smallmatrix}\left[\ce{M}/\ce{H}\right]\end{smallmatrix}$ = −0.16±0.04
Rotational velocity (v sin i)	9.11±0.02 km/s
Age	300 Myr

Other designations
- AG+67°4, BD+67°1599, HD 1, HIP 422, SAO 10963, GSC 04294-00080

Database references
SIMBAD	data

HD 1, also known as HIP 422, is a star located in the northern circumpolar constellation Cepheus and has an apparent magnitude of 7.42, making it readily visible in binoculars, but not to the naked eye. The object is located relatively far away at a distance of 1,220 light years but is approaching the Solar System with a spectroscopic radial velocity of −27.3 km/s.

== Characteristics ==
Originally thought to be a single object, observations from Griffin & McClure (2009) reveal it to be a single-lined spectroscopic binary. The components take 2,318.70 days (6.3483 years) to fully orbit each other in a mildly-eccentric orbit. The visible component is an evolved red-giant branch (RGB) star with a stellar classification of G9-K0 IIIa, a spectral class intermediate between a G9 and K0 giant star. It has 3.5 times the mass of the Sun, but at the age of 300 million years it has expanded to 20.7 times its radius. It radiates 217 times the luminosity of the Sun from its enlarged photosphere at an effective temperature of 4,882 K, giving it a yellowish-orange hue. HD 1A is metal-poor, with a metal-to-hydrogen abundance ratio 70% of the Sun's level. The object spins modestly with a projected rotational velocity of 9.11±0.02 km/s.

There is evidence for a third object in the system on a much wider orbit.

It is the first star catalogued in the Henry Draper Catalogue.
