= JADES-GS-z13-0 =

High-redshift Lyman-break galaxy that is one of the oldest galaxies known

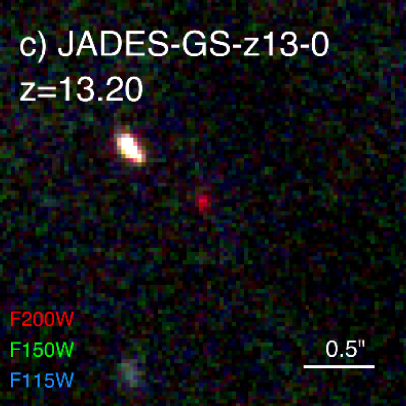
- James Webb Space Telescope NIRCam color composite image of JADES-GS-z13-0

Observation data (J2000 epoch)
- Constellation: Fornax
- Right ascension: 03^{h} 32^{m} 35.97^{s}
- Declination: −27° 46′ 35.4″
- Redshift: 13.20+0.04 −0.07
- Distance: ≈33.6 billion ly (10.3 billion pc) (present proper distance); ≈13.4 billion ly (4.1 billion pc) (light-travel distance)
- Apparent magnitude (V): 29.43±0.14 AB (F200W)
- Absolute magnitude (V): −18.73±0.06 (UV)

Characteristics
- Mass: 8.91+4.89 −4.34×10^{7} M_{☉}

Other designations
- JADES-GS+53.1499–27.7765, DMM2023 UDF-22450

JADES-GS-z13-0 is a high-redshift Lyman-break galaxy discovered by the James Webb Space Telescope (JWST) during NIRCam imaging for the JWST Advanced Deep Extragalactic Survey (JADES) on 29 September 2022. Spectroscopic observations by JWST's NIRSpec instrument in October 2022 confirmed the galaxy's redshift of z = 13.2 to a high accuracy, establishing it as the oldest and most distant spectroscopically-confirmed galaxy at the time, with a light-travel distance (lookback time) of 13.4 billion years. Because of the expansion of the universe, its present proper distance is approximately 33 billion light-years. In 2024, two older and more distant galaxies, JADES-GS-z14-0 and JADES-GS-z14-1, were found.

JADES-GS-z13-0 is located in the Great Observatories Origins Deep Survey – South (GOODS-S) field in the constellation Fornax, which includes the Hubble Ultra Deep Field.

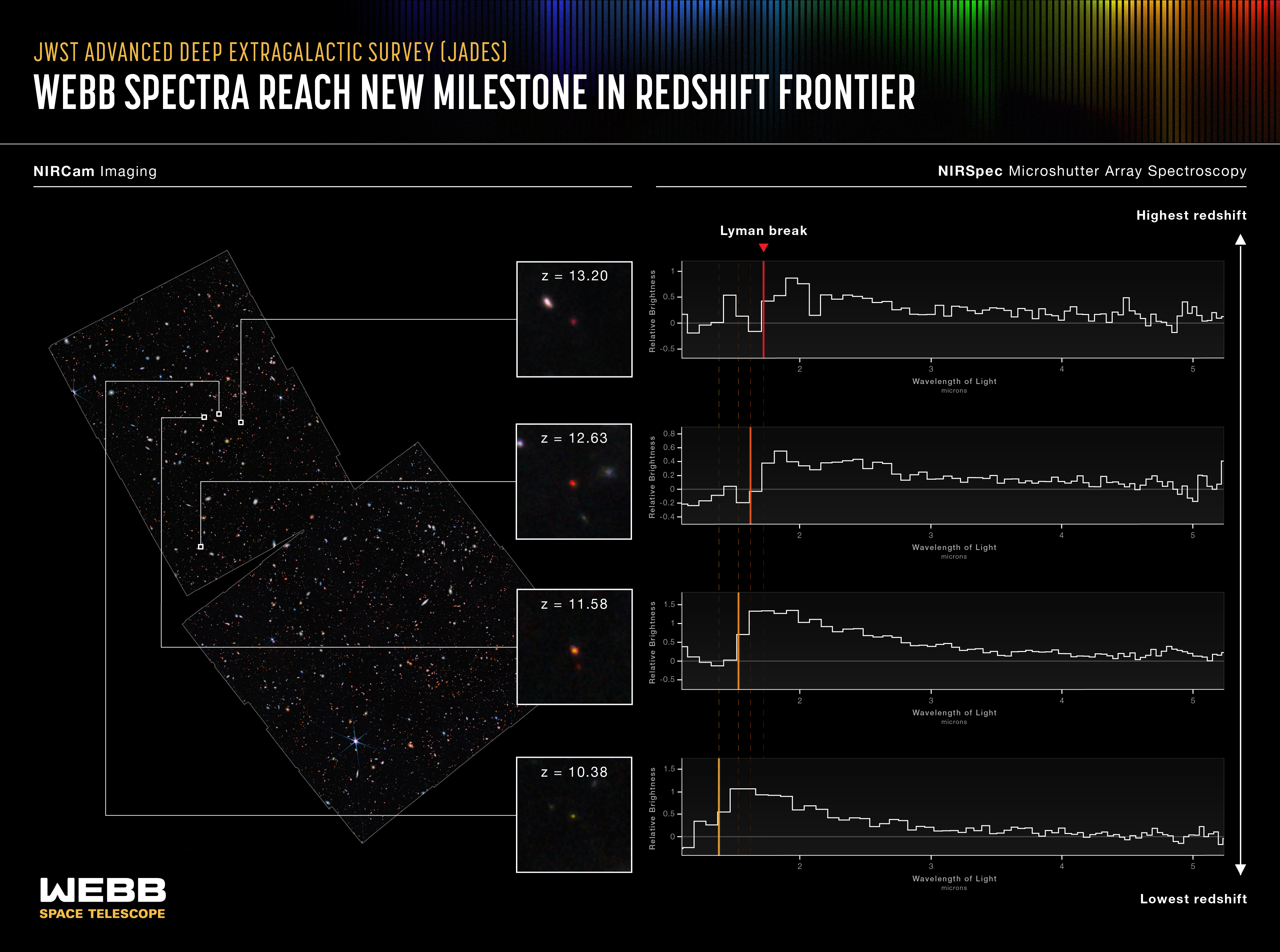
James Webb Space Telescope NIRSpec spectra of four high-redshift galaxies including JADES-GS-z13-0

== See also ==
- GN-z11 – Previous record holder from 2016 to 2022. (z = 10.603)
- List of the most distant astronomical objects

Records
| Preceded by GN-z11 | Most distant known astronomical object 2022–2024 | Succeeded by JADES-GS-z14-0 |
| Preceded by GN-z11 | Most distant known galaxy 2022–2024 | Succeeded by JADES-GS-z14-0 |
