= Photometric redshift =

A photometric redshift is an estimate for the recession velocity of an astronomical object such as a galaxy or quasar, made without measuring its spectrum. The technique uses photometry (that is, the brightness of the object viewed through various standard filters, each of which lets through a relatively broad passband of colours, such as red light, green light, or blue light) to determine the redshift, and hence, through Hubble's law, the distance, of the observed object.

The technique was developed in the 1960s, but was largely replaced in the 1970s and 1980s by spectroscopic redshifts, using spectroscopy to observe the frequency (or wavelength) of characteristic spectral lines, and measure the shift of these lines from their laboratory positions. The photometric redshift technique has come back into mainstream use since 2000, as a result of large sky surveys conducted in the late 1990s and 2000s which have detected a large number of faint high-redshift objects, and telescope time limitations mean that only a small fraction of these can be observed by spectroscopy. Photometric redshifts were originally determined by calculating the expected observed data from a known emission spectrum at a range of redshifts. The technique relies upon the spectrum of radiation being emitted by the object having strong features that can be detected by the relatively crude filters.

As photometric filters are sensitive to a range of wavelengths, and the technique relies on making many assumptions about the nature of the spectrum at the light-source, errors for these sorts of measurements can range up to δz = 0.5, and are much less reliable than spectroscopic determinations. In the absence of sufficient telescope time to determine a spectroscopic redshift for each object, the technique of photometric redshifts provides a method to determine an at least qualitative characterization of a redshift. For example, if a Sun-like spectrum had a redshift of z = 1, it would be brightest in the infrared rather than at the yellow-green color associated with the peak of its blackbody spectrum, and the light intensity will be reduced in the filter by a factor of two (i.e. 1+z) (see K correction for more details on the photometric consequences of redshift).

Other means of estimating the redshift based on alternative observed quantities have been developed, like morphological redshifts of galaxy clusters derived from geometric measurements. In recent years, Bayesian statistical methods and artificial neural networks have been used to estimate redshifts from photometric data.
