= NIRCam =

Imaging instrument aboard the James Webb Space Telescope

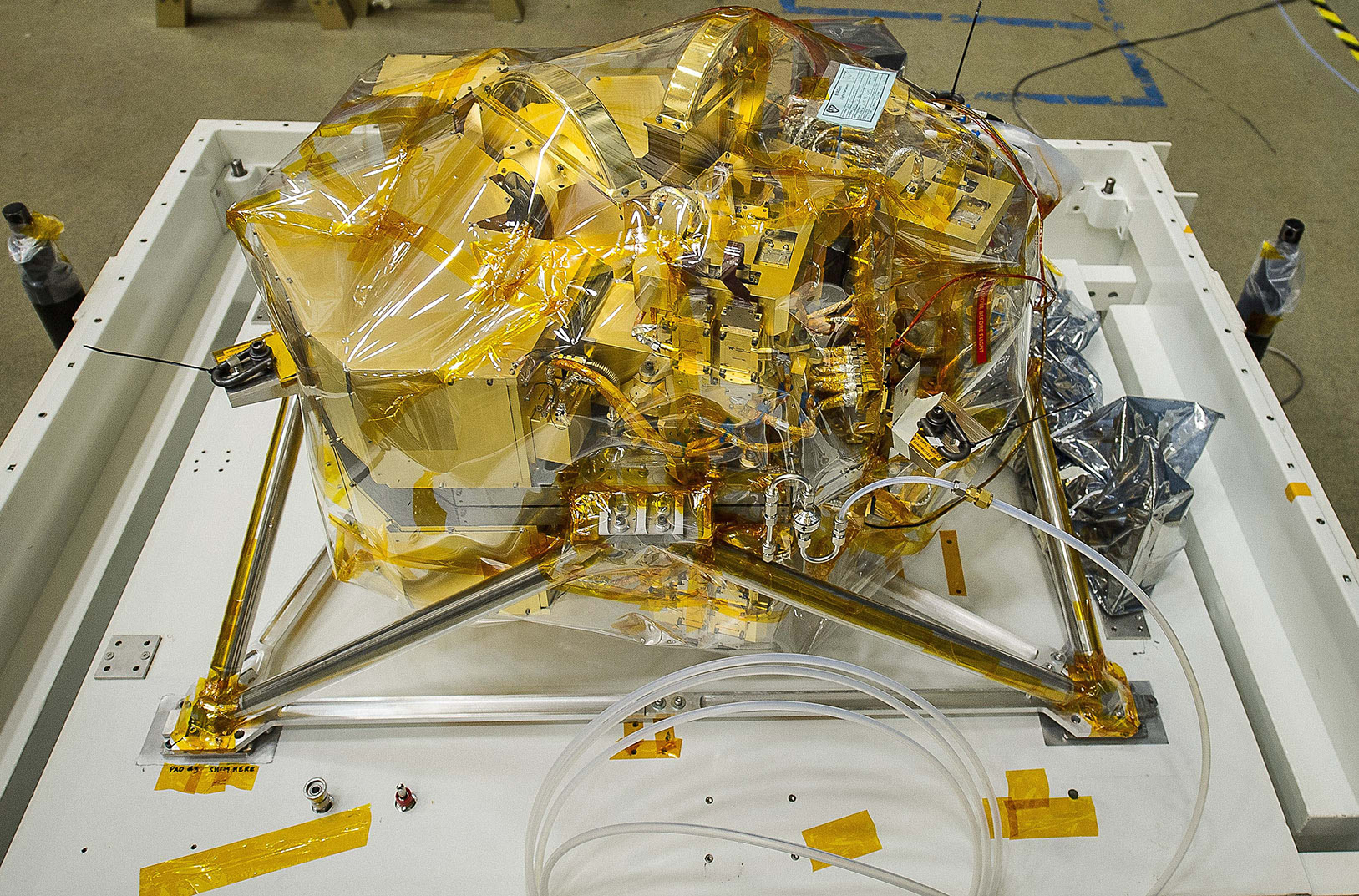
NIRCam wrapped up in 2013

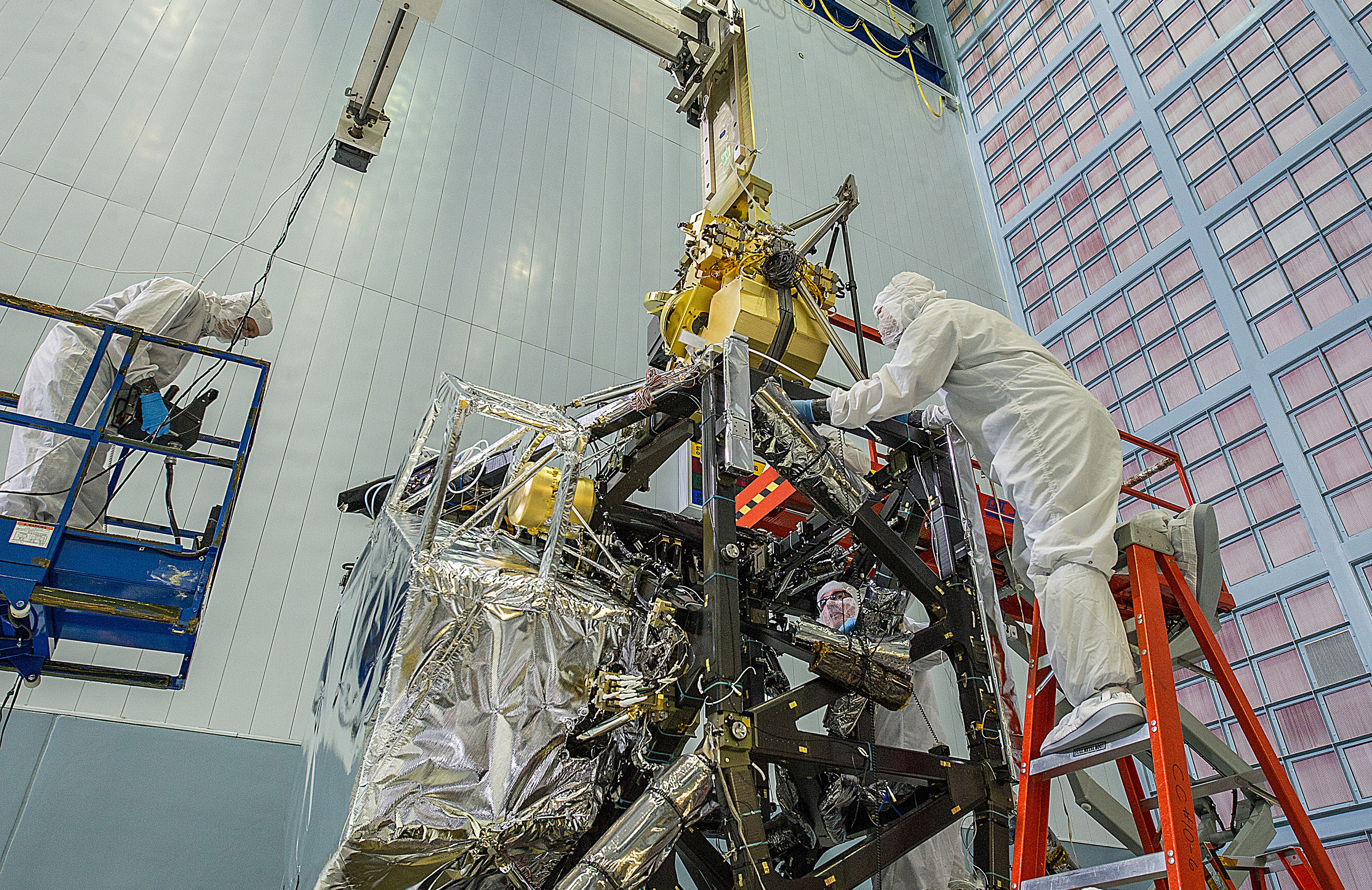
NIRCam being installed in 2014

NIRCam (Near-InfraRed Camera) is an instrument aboard the James Webb Space Telescope. It has two major tasks, as an imager from 0.6 to 5 μm wavelength, and as a wavefront sensor to keep the 18-section mirrors functioning as one. In other words, it is a camera and is also used to provide information to align the 18 segments of the primary mirror. It is an infrared camera with ten mercury-cadmium-telluride (HgCdTe) detector arrays, and each array has an array of 2048×2048 pixels. The camera has a field of view of 2.2×2.2 arcminutes with an angular resolution of 0.07 arcseconds at 2 μm. NIRCam is also equipped with coronagraphs, which helps to collect data on exoplanets near stars. It helps with imaging anything next to a much brighter object, because the coronagraph blocks that light.

NIRCam is housed in the Integrated Science Instrument Module (ISIM). It is connected to the ISIM mechanically with a system of kinematic mounts in the structural form of struts. There are thermal straps connecting the NIRCam optical bench assembly to the ISIM structure and to thermal radiators. It is designed to operate between 32 K (−241.2 °C; −402.1 °F) and 37 K (−236.2 °C; −393.1 °F). The Focal Plane Electronics operate at 290 K.

NIRCam should be able to observe objects as faint as magnitude +29 with a 10,000-second exposure (about 2.8 hours). It makes these observations in light from 0.6 to 5 μm (600 to 5000 nm) wavelength. It can observe in two fields of view, and either side can do imaging, or from the capabilities of the wave-front sensing equipment, spectroscopy. The wavefront sensing is much finer than the thickness of an average human hair. It must perform at an accuracy of at least 93 nanometers and in testing it has even achieved between 32 and 52 nm. A human hair is thousands of nanometers across.

== Main ==
=== Components ===
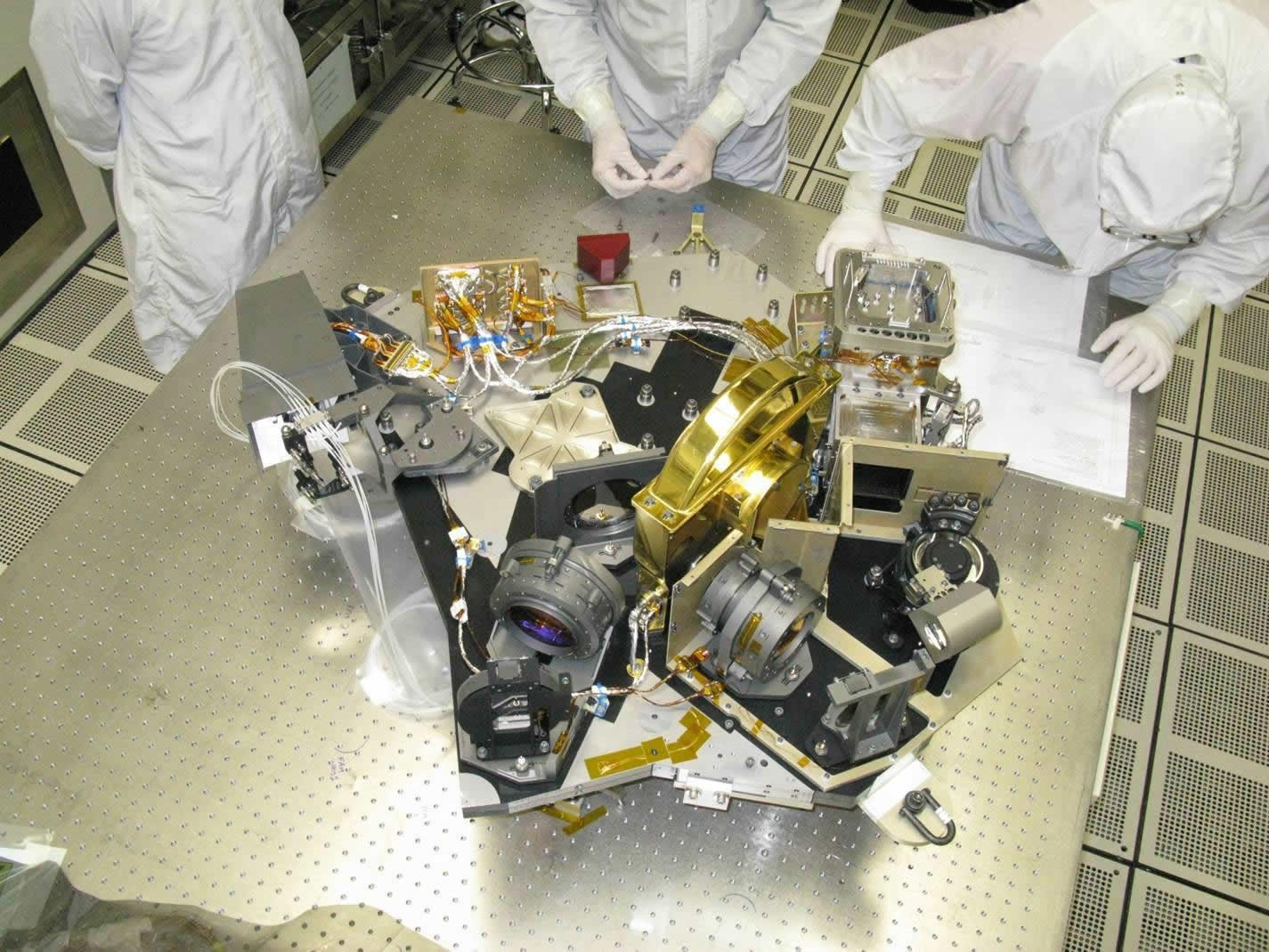
NIRCam Engineering Test Unit, showing some of the internal optics of NIRCam such as the collimating lenses and the mirrors

Wavefront sensor components include:

- Dispersed Hartmann sensors
- Grisms for slittless spectroscopy in the 2.5–5.0 μm range
- Weak lenses

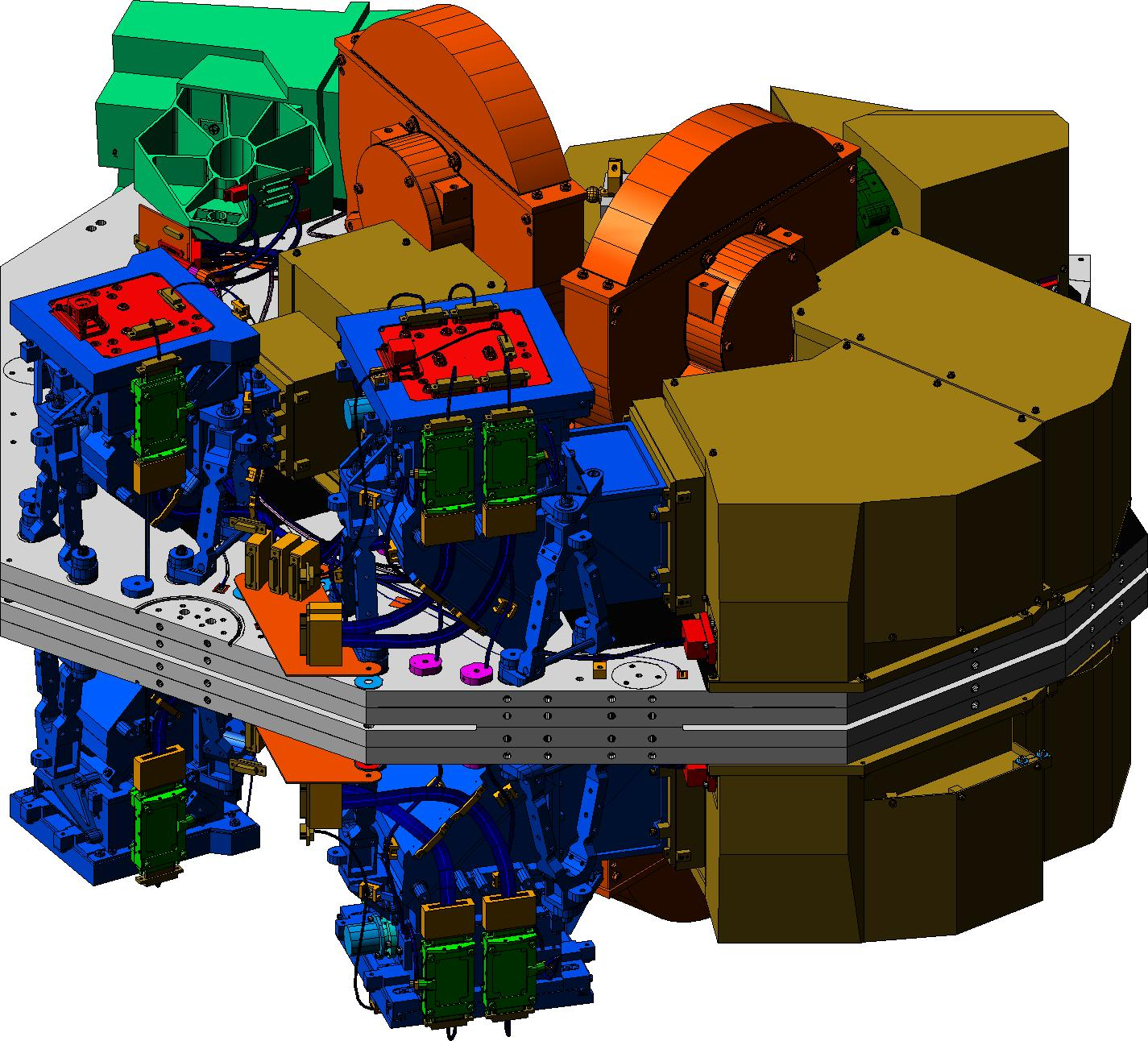
CAD model of the NIRCAM module

Parts of NIRCam:

- Pick-off mirror
- Coronograph
- First-fold mirror
- Collimator lenses
- Dichroic beam splitter
- Longwave filter wheel
- Longwave camera lens group
- Longwave focal plane
- Shortwave filter wheel assembly
- Shortwave camera lens group
- Shortwave fold mirror
- Pupil imaging lens
- Shortwave focal plane

=== Overview ===
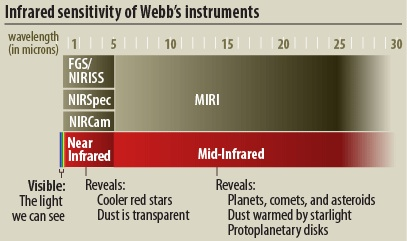
Infographic of James Webb Space Telescope instruments and their observation ranges of light by wavelength

NIRCam has two complete optical systems for redundancy. The two sides can operate at the same time, and view two separate patches of sky; the two sides are called side A and side B. The lenses used in the internal optics are triplet refractors. The lens materials are lithium fluoride (LiF), a barium fluoride (BaF_{2}) and zinc selenide (ZnSe). The triplet lenses are collimating optics. The biggest lens has 90 mm of clear aperture.

The observed wavelength range is broken up into a short wavelength and a long wavelength band. The short wavelength band goes from 0.6 to 2.3 μm and the long wavelength band goes from 2.4 to 5 μm; both have the same field of view and access to a coronagraph. Each side of the NIRCam views a 2.2 arcminute by 2.2 arcminute patch of sky in both the short and long wavelengths; however, the short wavelength arm has twice the resolution. The long wavelength arm has one array per side (two overall), and the short wavelength arm has four arrays per side, or 8 overall. Side A and Side B have a unique field of view, but they are adjacent to each other. In other words, the camera looks at two 2.2 arcminute wide fields of view that are next to each other, and each of these views is observed at short and long wavelengths simultaneously with the short wavelength arm having twice the resolution of the longer wavelength arm.

=== Design and manufacturing ===
The builders of NIRCam are the University of Arizona, company Lockheed Martin, and Teledyne Technologies, in cooperation with the U.S. Space agency, NASA. Lockheed Martin tested and assembled the device. Teledyne Technologies designed and manufactured the ten mercury-cadmium-telluride (HgCdTe) detector arrays. NIRCam was completed in July 2013 and it was shipped to Goddard Spaceflight Center, which is the NASA center managing the JWST project.

NIRCam's four major science goals include:

1. Exploring the formation and evolution of the first luminous objects and revealing the reionization history of the Universe.
2. Determining how objects seen in the present day (galaxies, active galaxies, and clusters of galaxies) assembled and evolved out of gas, stars, metals present in the early Universe.
3. Improve our understanding of the birth of stars and planetary systems.
4. Study the physical and chemical conditions of objects in our solar system with a goal of understanding the origin of the building blocks of life on Earth.

— Science Opportunities with the Near-IR Camera (NIRCam) on the James Webb Space Telescope (JWST), Biechman, et al.

== Electronics ==
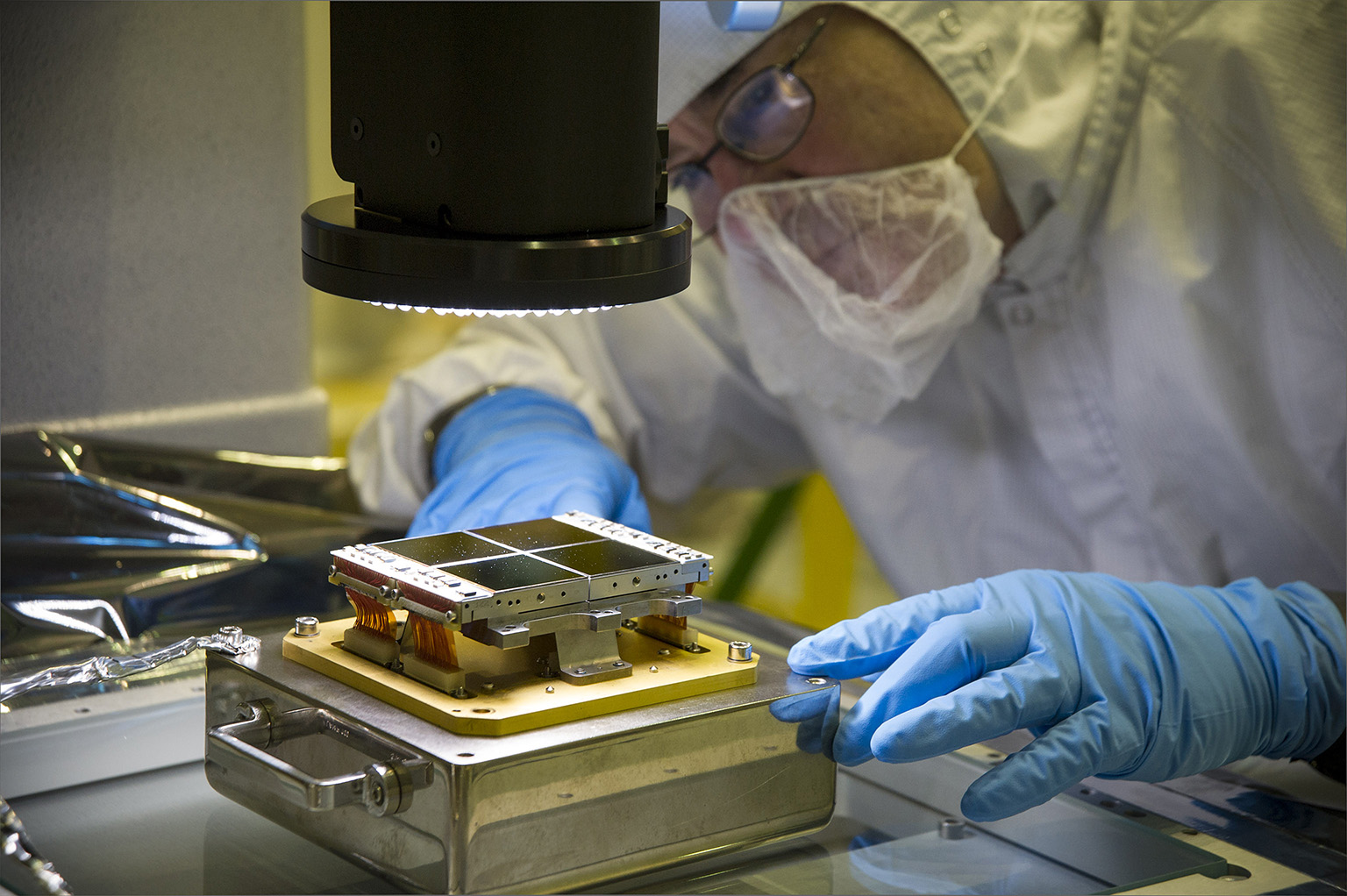
NIRCam Focal Plane Assembly (FPA) undergoing inspection, 2013

Data from the image sensors (Focal Plane Arrays) is collected by the Focal Plane Electronics and sent to the ISIM computer. The data between the FPE and the ISIM computer is transferred by SpaceWire connection. There are also Instrument Control Electronics (ICE). The Focal Plane Arrays contain 40 million pixels.

The FPE provides or monitors the following for the FPA:

- Regulated power
- Output data synchronization
- Temperature control
- Operational mode controls
- Image data conditioning
- Image data amplification
- Image data digitization

== Filters ==
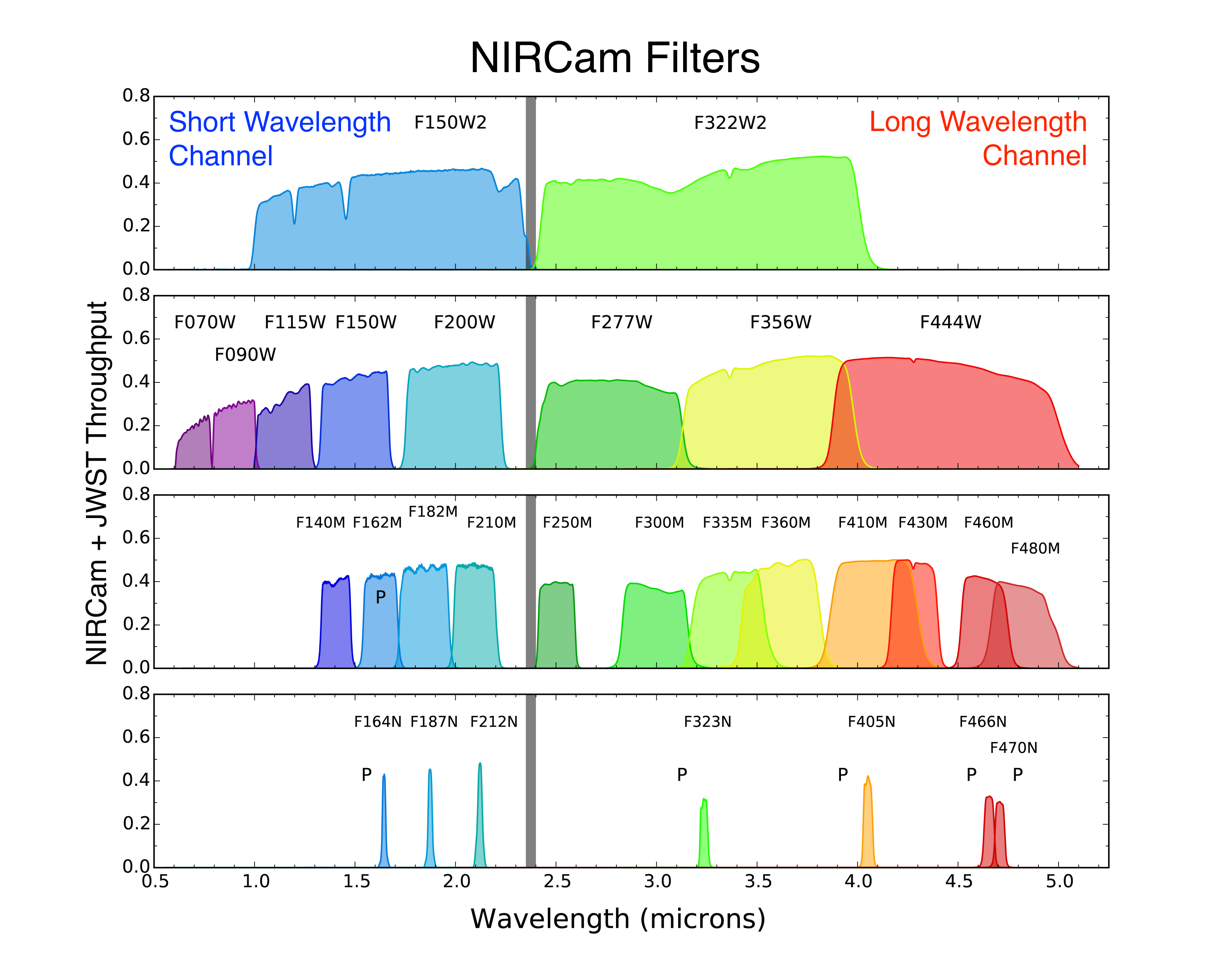
NIRCam + JWST Optical Telescope Element (OTE) filter throughputs

NIRcam includes filter wheels that allow the light coming in from the optics to be sent through a filter before it is recorded by the sensors. The filters have a certain range in which they allow light to pass, blocking the other frequencies; this allows operators of NIRCam some control over what frequencies are observed when making an observation with the telescope.

By using multiple filters the redshift of distant galaxies can be estimated by photometry.

NIRcam filters:

Short wavelength channel (0.6–2.3 μm)

- F070W – General purpose
- F090W – General purpose
- F115W – General purpose
- F140M – Cool stars, H_{2}O, CH_{4}
- F150W – General purpose
- F150W2 – Blocking filter for F162M, F164N, and DHS
- F162M – Cool Stars, off-band for H_{2}O
- F164N – [FeII]
- F182M – Cool stars, H_{2}O, CH_{4}
- F187N – Pa-alpha
- F200W – General purpose
- F210M – H_{2}O, CH_{4}
- F212N – H_{2}

Long wavelength channel (2.4–5.0 μm)

- F250M – CH_{4}, continuum
- F277W – General purpose
- F300M – Water ice
- F322W2 – Background min. Primarily used w/ grisms. Blocking filter for F323N.
- F323N – H_{2}
- F335M – PAH, CH_{4}
- F356W – General purpose
- F360M – Brown dwarfs, planets, continuum
- F405N – Br-alpha
- F410M – Brown dwarfs, planets, H_{2}O, CH_{4}
- F430M – CO_{2}, N_{2}
- F444W – General purpose. Blocking filter for F405N, F466N, F470N.
- F460M – CO
- F466N – CO
- F470N – H_{2}
- F480M – Brown dwarfs, planets, continuum

== Labeled diagram ==
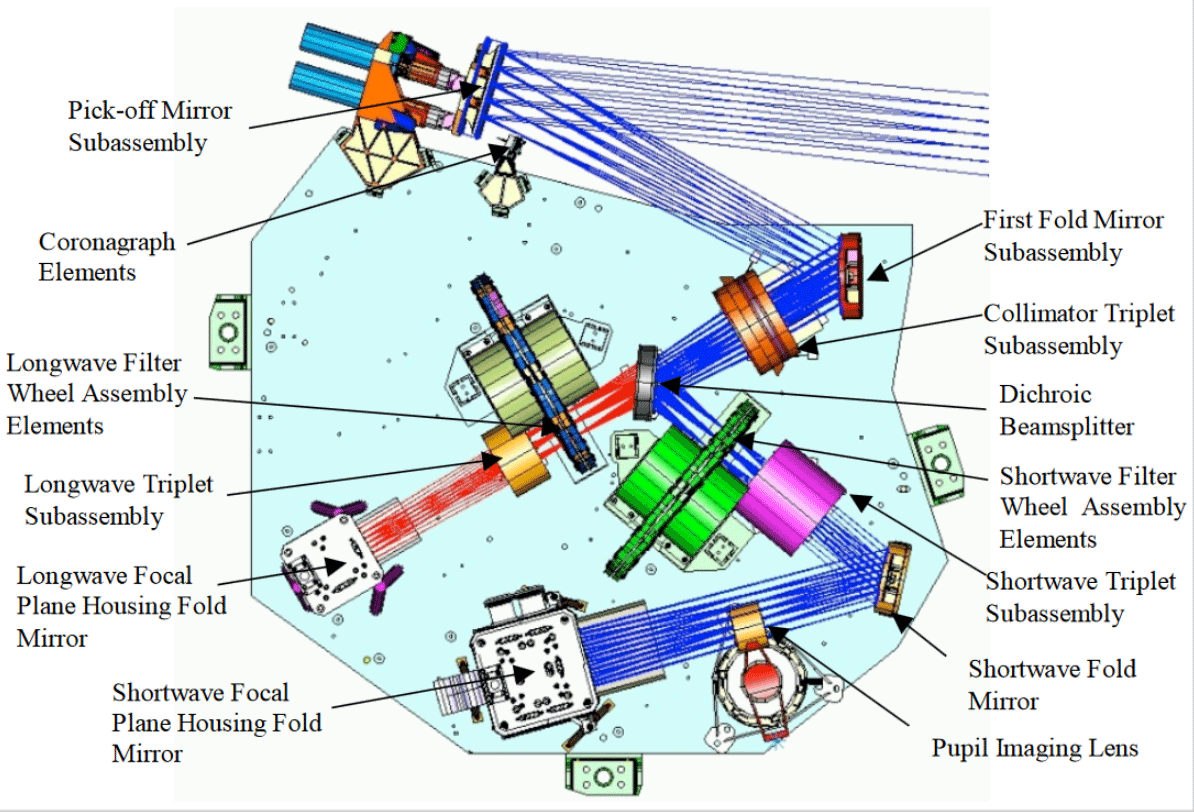
Labeled diagram of components of NIRcam

== See also ==
- Optical Telescope Element
- James Webb Space Telescope timeline
- Near Infrared Camera and Multi-Object Spectrometer (defunct NIR Hubble instrument)
- Wide Field Camera 3 (current NIR Hubble instrument)
- MIRI (Mid-Infrared Instrument) (JWST's 5–28 μm camera/spectrograph)
- Infrared Array Camera (Spitzer near- to mid-infrared camera)
