= James Webb Space Telescope =

NASA/ESA/CSA infrared space telescope launched in 2021

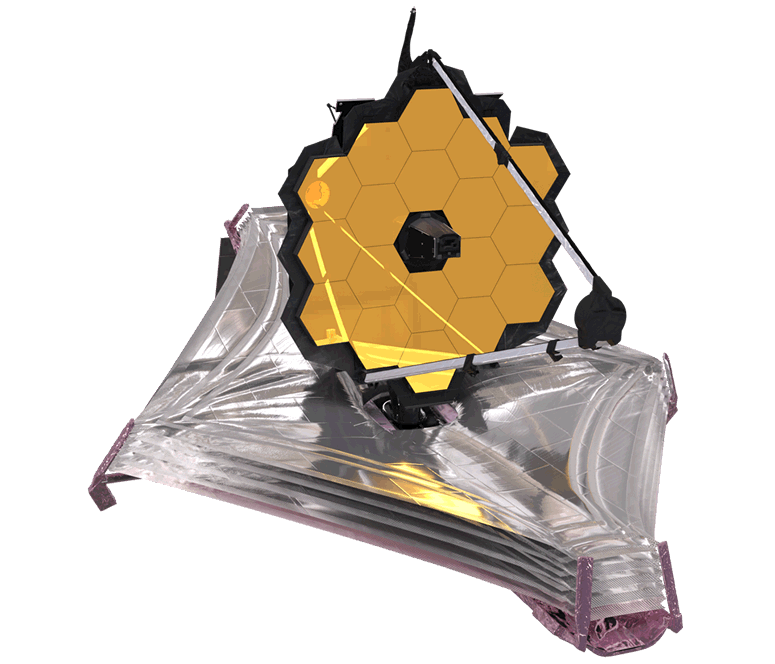
- Rendering of the fully deployed James Webb Space Telescope
- Names: Next Generation Space Telescope (NGST; 1996–2002); James Webb Space Telescope (JWST; 2002–present)
- Mission type: Astronomy
- Operator: STScI (NASA) / ESA / CSA
- COSPAR ID: 2021-130A
- SATCAT no.: 50463
- Website: jwst.nasa.gov webbtelescope.org
- Mission duration: 4 years, 10 months, 25 days (elapsed); 5 1/2 years (primary mission); 10 years (planned); 20 years (expected life)

Spacecraft properties
- Manufacturer: Northrop Grumman; Ball Aerospace & Technologies; L3Harris
- Launch mass: 6,500 kg (14,300 lb)
- Dimensions: 21.197 × 14.162 m (69.54 × 46.46 ft), sunshield
- Power: 2 kW

Start of mission
- Launch date: 25 December 2021, 12:20 UTC
- Rocket: Ariane 5 ECA+ (S/N 5113, Flight VA256)
- Launch site: Guiana, ELA-3
- Contractor: Arianespace
- Entered service: 12 July 2022

Orbital parameters
- Reference system: Sun–Earth L_{2} orbit
- Regime: Halo orbit
- Periapsis altitude: 250,000 km (160,000 mi)
- Apoapsis altitude: 832,000 km (517,000 mi)
- Period: 6 months

Main telescope
- Type: Korsch telescope
- Diameter: 6.5 m (21 ft)
- Focal length: 131.4 m (431 ft)
- Focal ratio: f/20.2
- Collecting area: 25.4 m^{2} (273 sq ft)
- Wavelengths: 0.6–28.5 μm (orange to mid-infrared)

Transponders
- Band: S-band, telemetry and telecommand; K_{a}-band, science data downlink
- Bandwidth: S-band up: 16 kbit/s; S-band down: 40 kbit/s; K_{a}-band down: up to 28 Mbit/s

Instruments
- FGS-NIRISS; MIRI; NIRCam; NIRSpec

Elements
- Integrated Science Instrument Module; Optical Telescope Element; Spacecraft (Bus and Sunshield)
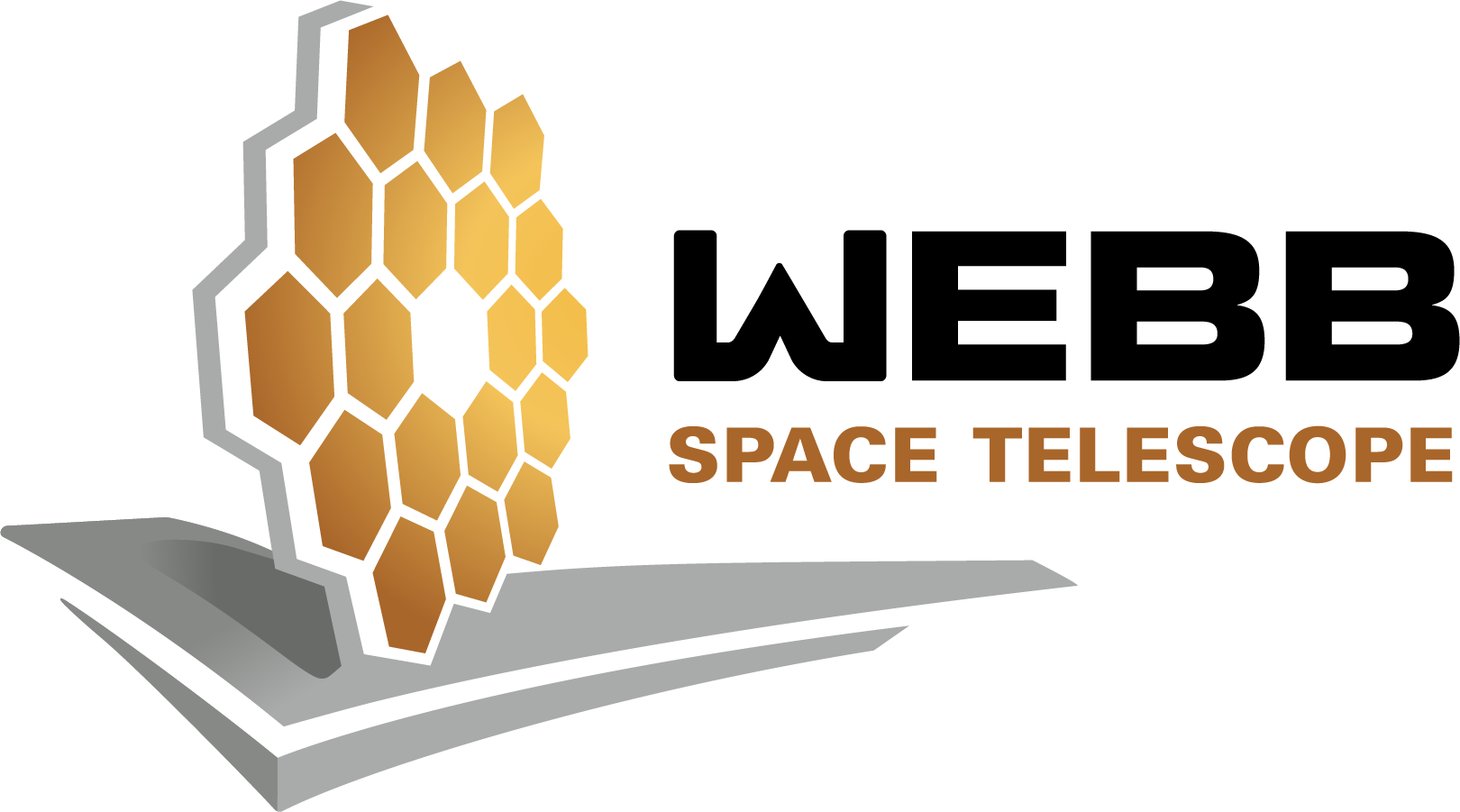
- James Webb Space Telescope mission logo Large Strategic Science Missions; Astrophysics Division

The James Webb Space Telescope (JWST) is a space telescope designed to conduct infrared astronomy. It is the largest telescope in space, and is equipped with high-resolution and high-sensitivity instruments, allowing it to view objects too old, distant, or faint for the Hubble Space Telescope. This enables investigations across many fields of astronomy and cosmology, such as observation of the first stars and the formation of the first galaxies, and detailed atmospheric characterization of potentially habitable exoplanets.

Despite Webb's mirror diameter being 2.7 times larger than that of the Hubble Space Telescope, it produces images of comparable resolution because it observes in the infrared spectrum, which has longer wavelengths than the Hubble's visible spectrum. The longer the wavelength the telescope is designed to observe, the larger the information-gathering surface (mirrors in the infrared spectrum or antenna area in the millimeter and radio ranges) required to achieve the desired resolution.

The Webb was launched on 25 December 2021 on an Ariane 5 rocket from Kourou, French Guiana. In January 2022, it arrived at its destination, a solar orbit near the Sun–Earth L_{2} Lagrange point, about 1.5 million kilometers (930,000 mi) from Earth. The telescope's first image was released to the public on 11 July 2022.

The U.S. National Aeronautics and Space Administration (NASA) led Webb's design and development and partnered with two central agencies: the European Space Agency (ESA) and the Canadian Space Agency (CSA). The NASA Goddard Space Flight Center in Maryland managed telescope development, while the Space Telescope Science Institute in Baltimore on the Homewood Campus of Johns Hopkins University operates Webb. The primary contractor for the project was Northrop Grumman.

The telescope is named after James E. Webb, who was the administrator of NASA from 1961 to 1968 during the Mercury, Gemini, and Apollo programs.

Webb's primary mirror consists of 18 hexagonal mirror segments made of gold-plated beryllium, which together create a 6.5-meter-diameter (21 ft) mirror, compared with Hubble's 2.4 m (7 ft 10 in). This gives Webb a light-collecting area of about 25 m^{2} (270 sq ft), about six times that of Hubble. Unlike Hubble, which observes in the near ultraviolet, visible, and near infrared spectra (0.1–2.5 μm), Webb observes a lower frequency range, from long-wavelength visible light (red) through mid-infrared (0.6–28.5 μm). The telescope must be kept extremely cold, below 50 K (−223 °C; −370 °F), so that the infrared radiation emitted by the telescope itself does not interfere with the collected light. Its five-layer sunshield protects it from warming by the Sun, Earth, and Moon.

Initial designs for the telescope, then named the Next Generation Space Telescope, began in 1996. Two concept studies were commissioned in 1999, for a potential launch in 2007 and a US$1 billion budget. The program saw enormous cost overruns and delays. A significant redesign was carried out in 2005, with construction completed in 2016, followed by years of exhaustive testing, at a total cost of US$10 billion.

== Features ==
The mass of the James Webb Space Telescope (JWST) is about half that of the Hubble Space Telescope. Webb has a 6.5-meter-diameter (21-foot) gold-coated beryllium primary mirror made up of 18 separate hexagonal mirrors. The mirror has a polished area of 26.3 m^{2} (283 ft^{2}), of which 0.9 m^{2} (9.7 ft^{2}) is obscured by the secondary support struts, giving a total collecting area of 25.4 m^{2} (273 ft^{2}). This is over six times larger than the collecting area of Hubble's 2.4 m (7.9 ft) diameter mirror, which has a collecting area of 4.0 m^{2} (43 ft^{2}). The mirror has a gold coating to provide infrared reflectivity, covered by a thin layer of glass for durability.

Webb is designed primarily for near-infrared astronomy, but can also detect orange and red visible light and the mid-infrared region, depending on the instrument used. It can detect objects up to 100 times fainter than Hubble can, and objects much earlier in the history of the universe, back to redshift z≈20 (about 180 million years cosmic time after the Big Bang). For comparison, the earliest stars are thought to have formed between z≈30 and z≈20 (100–180 million years cosmic time), and the first galaxies may have formed around redshift z≈15 (about 270 million years cosmic time). Hubble is unable to see further back than very early reionization at about z≈11.1 (galaxy GN-z11, 400 million years cosmic time).

The design emphasizes the near to mid-infrared for several reasons:

- high-redshift (very early and distant) objects have their visible emissions shifted into the infrared, and therefore their light can be observed only via infrared astronomy;
- infrared light passes more easily through dust clouds than visible light;
- colder objects such as debris disks and planets emit most strongly in the infrared;
- These infrared bands are difficult to study from the ground or by earlier space telescopes such as Hubble.

Rough plot of Earth's atmospheric absorption (or opacity) to various wavelengths of electromagnetic radiation, including visible light

Ground-based telescopes must look through Earth's atmosphere, which is opaque in many infrared bands (see figure at right). Even where the atmosphere is transparent, many of the target chemical compounds, such as water, carbon dioxide, and methane, are present in the Earth's atmosphere and interfere with observations. Existing space telescopes, such as Hubble, cannot study these bands since their mirrors are at a temperature high enough to emit significant infrared radiation; for example, the Hubble mirror is maintained at about 15 °C [288 K; 59 °F], so that the telescope itself radiates strongly in the relevant infrared bands.

Webb can also observe objects in the Solar System at angles greater than 85° from the Sun and with apparent angular rate of motion less than 0.03 arc seconds per second. (Note: JWST was designed with the requirement to track objects that move as fast as Mars, which has a maximum apparent speed on the sky of 30 mas/s, which is the value given in the technical specification, i.e., the nominal value. During commissioning, various asteroids were observed to determine the actual limitation for the speed of objects and it turned out to be 67 mas/s, which is more than twice the nominal value. Tracking at rates of 30–67 mas/s showed accuracies similar to tracking of slower targets. Thus, the telescope can observe also near-Earth asteroids (NEAs), comets closer to perihelion and interstellar objects. Later, after more experience with FGS had been gained, the tracking speed limit was finally set to 75 mas/s for routine observations. Higher rates up to 100 mas/s are also possible upon special request, as FGS requires multiple guide stars to achieve this, which introduces complexity and inefficiency. The first observation with a super-fast rate was the DART impact experiment on 26 September 2022.) This includes Mars, Jupiter, Saturn, Uranus, Neptune, Pluto, their satellites, and comets, asteroids and minor planets at or beyond the orbit of Mars. Webb has sufficient near-IR and mid-IR sensitivity to be able to observe virtually all known Kuiper Belt Objects. In addition, it can observe opportunistic and unplanned targets such as supernovae and gamma ray bursts within 48 hours of a decision to do so.

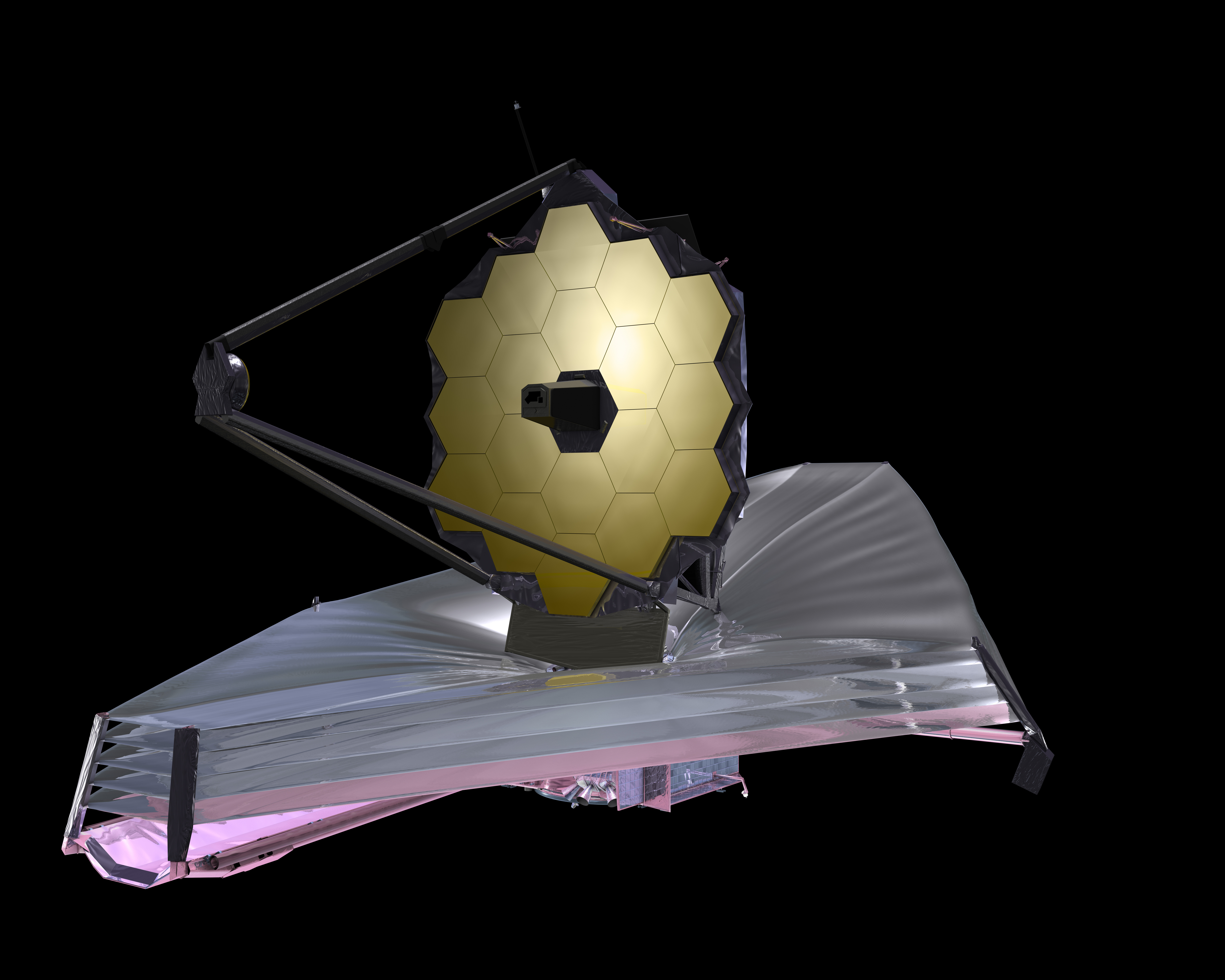
Three-quarter view of the top

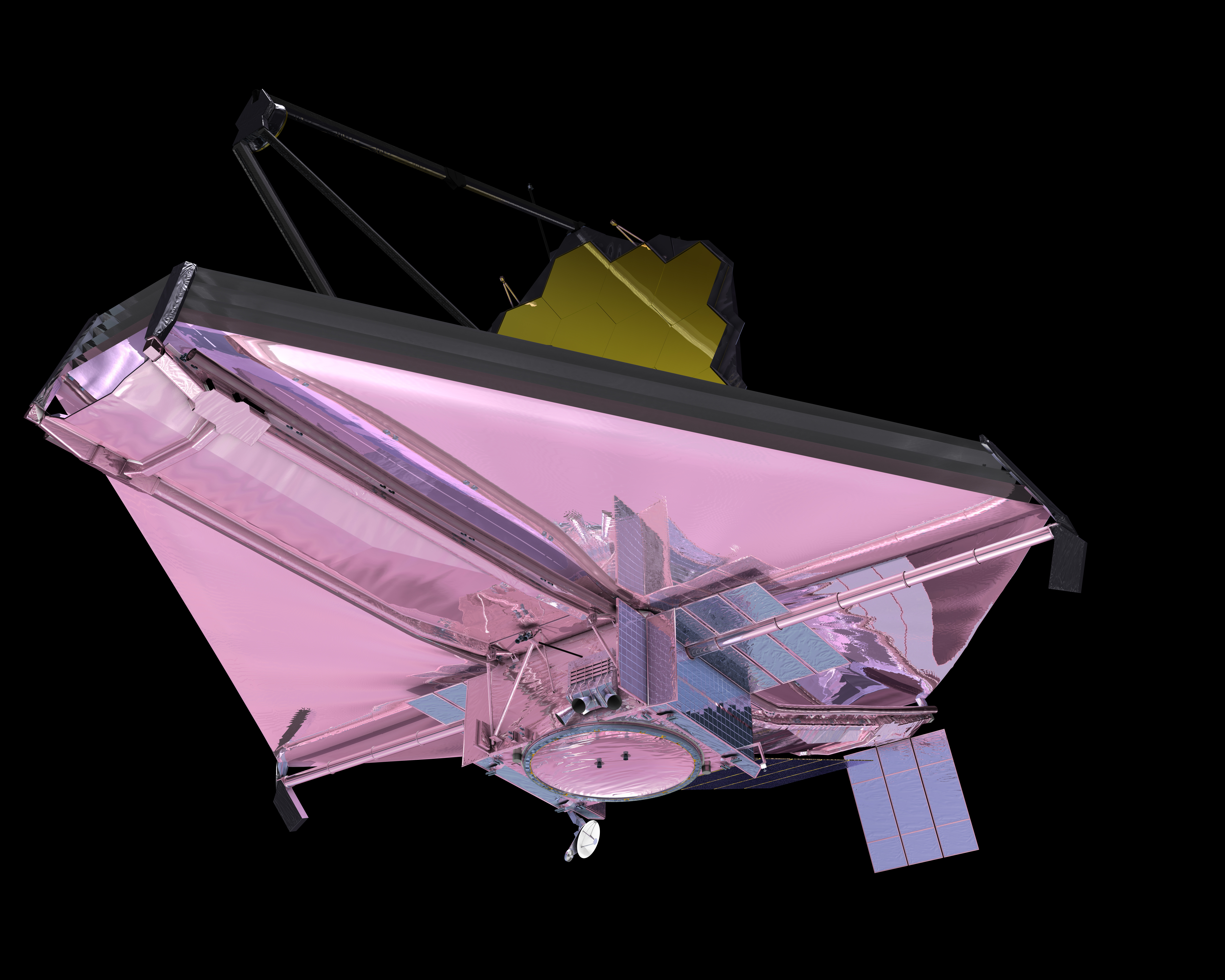
Bottom (Sun-facing side)

=== Location and orbit ===
Webb operates in a halo orbit, circling a point in space known as the Sun–Earth L_{2} Lagrange point, approximately 1,500,000 km (930,000 mi) beyond Earth's orbit around the Sun. Its actual position varies between about 250,000 and 832,000 km (155,000–517,000 mi) from L_{2} as it orbits, keeping it out of both Earth and Moon's shadow. By way of comparison, Hubble orbits 550 km (340 mi) above Earth's surface, and the Moon is roughly 400,000 km (250,000 mi) from Earth. Objects near this Sun–Earth L_{2} point can orbit the Sun in synchrony with the Earth, allowing the telescope to remain at a roughly constant distance with continuous orientation of its sunshield and equipment bus toward the Sun, Earth and Moon. Combined with its wide, shadow-avoiding orbit, the telescope can simultaneously block incoming heat and light from all three bodies and avoid even the most minor changes in temperature from Earth and Moon shadows that would affect the structure, while maintaining uninterrupted solar power and Earth communications on its Sun-facing side. This arrangement keeps the temperature of the spacecraft constant and below the 50 K (−223 °C; −370 °F) necessary for faint infrared observations.

=== Sunshield protection ===
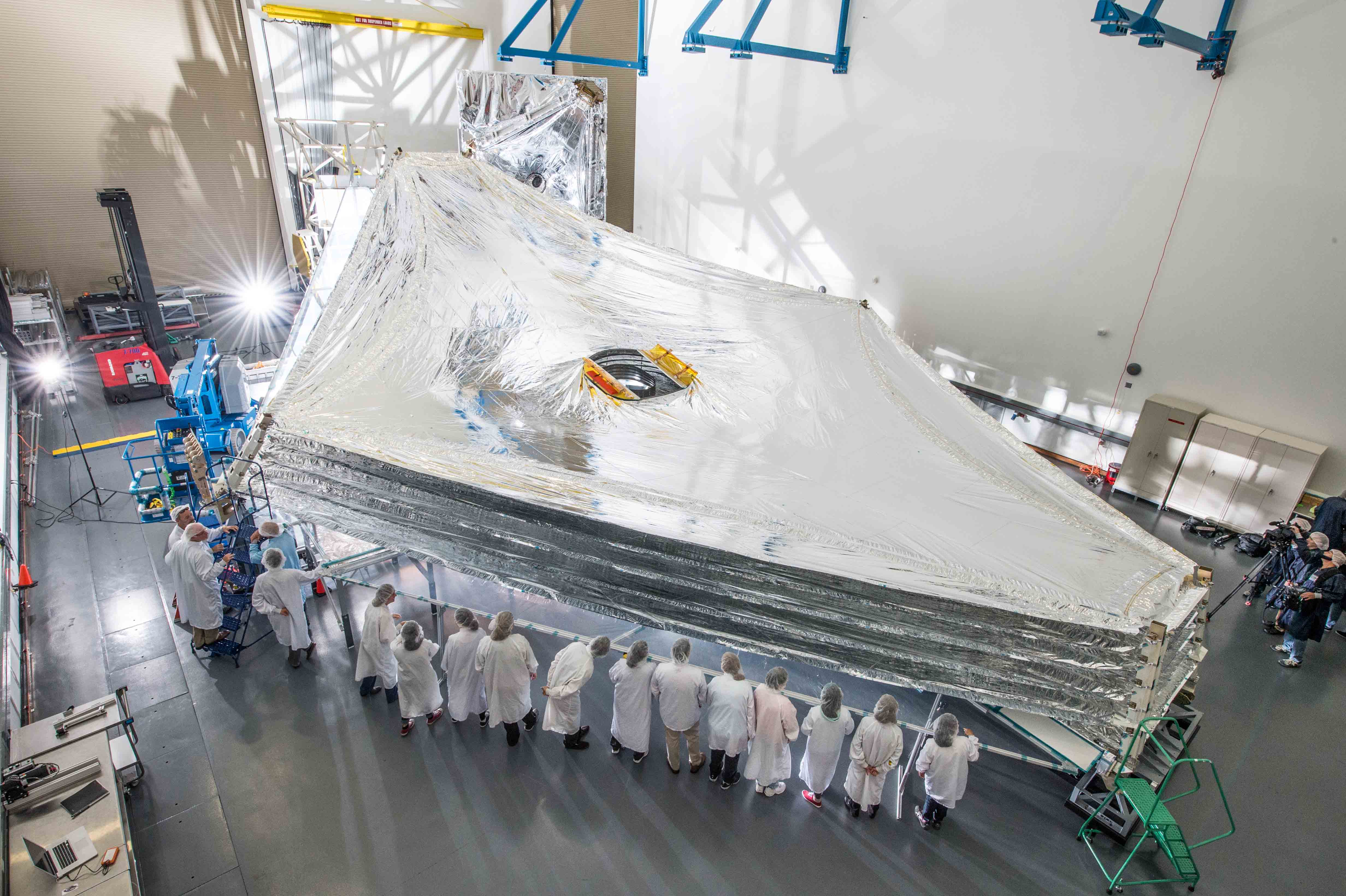
Test unit of the sunshield stacked and expanded at the Northrop Grumman facility in California, 2014

To make observations in the infrared spectrum, Webb must be kept under 50 K (−223.2 °C; −369.7 °F); otherwise, infrared radiation from the telescope itself would overwhelm its instruments. Its large sunshield blocks light and heat from the Sun, Earth, and Moon, and its position near the Sun–Earth L_{2} keeps all three bodies on the same side of the spacecraft at all times. Its halo orbit around the L_{2} point avoids the shadow of the Earth and Moon, maintaining a constant environment for the sunshield and solar arrays. The resulting stable temperature for the structures on the dark side is critical to maintaining precise alignment of the primary mirror segments.

The sunshield consists of five layers, each approximately 0.1mm thick. Each layer is made of Kapton E film, coated with aluminum on both sides. The two outermost layers have an additional coating of doped silicon on the Sun-facing sides, to better reflect the Sun's heat into space. The sunshield has an effective sun protection factor, or SPF, of 1,000,000, compared to suntan lotion with a range of 8 to 50. Accidental tears of the delicate film structure during deployment testing in 2018 led to further delays to the telescope deployment.

The sunshield was designed to be folded twelve times so that it would fit within the Ariane 5 rocket's payload fairing, which is 4.57 m (15.0 ft) in diameter, and 16.19 m (53.1 ft) long. The shield's fully deployed dimensions were planned as 14.162 m × 21.197 m (46.46 ft × 69.54 ft).

Keeping within the shadow of the sunshield limits the field of regard of Webb at any given time. The telescope can see 40 percent of the sky from any one position, but can see all of the sky over a period of six months.

=== Optics ===
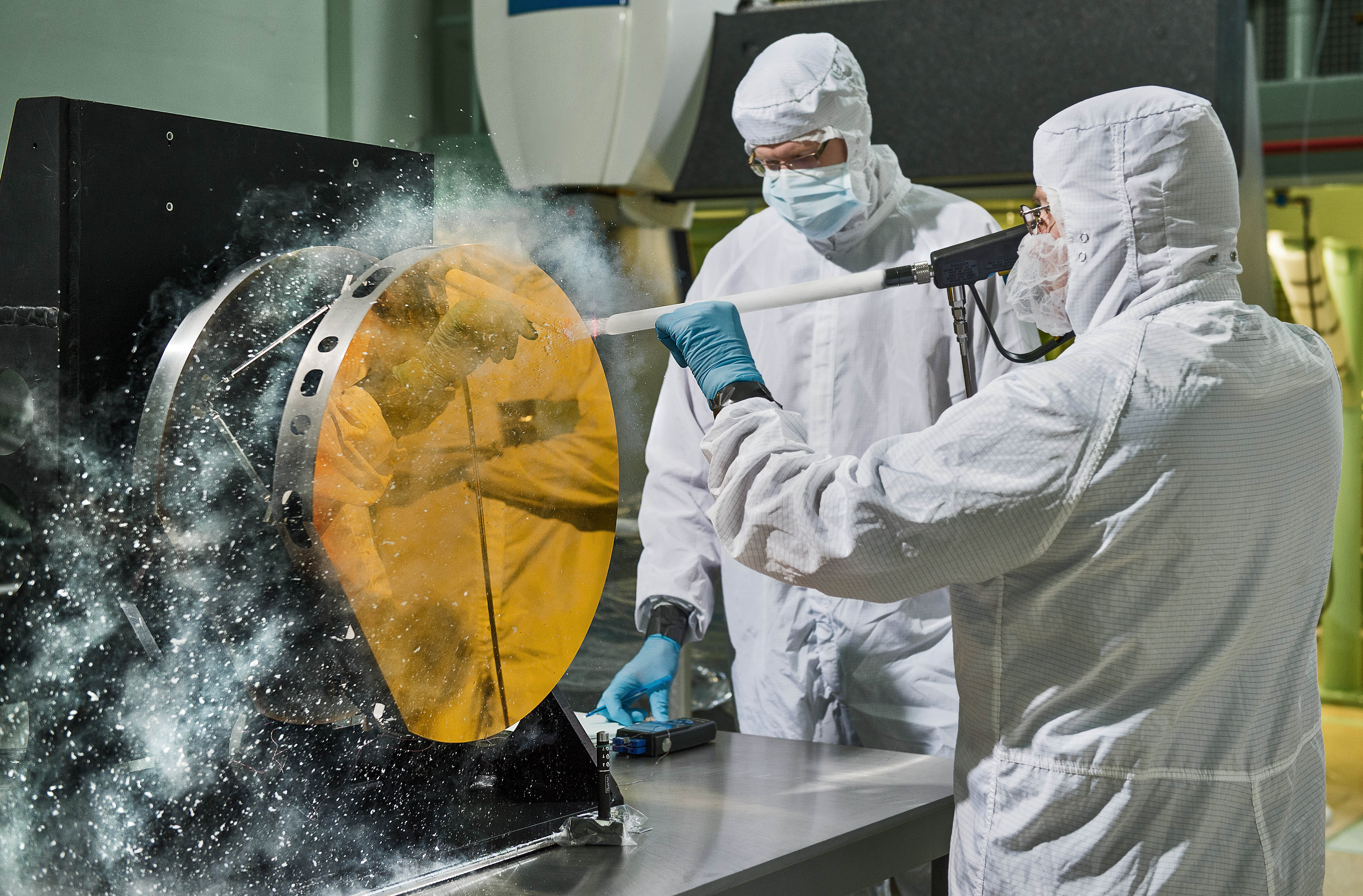
Engineers cleaning a test mirror with carbon dioxide snow, 2015

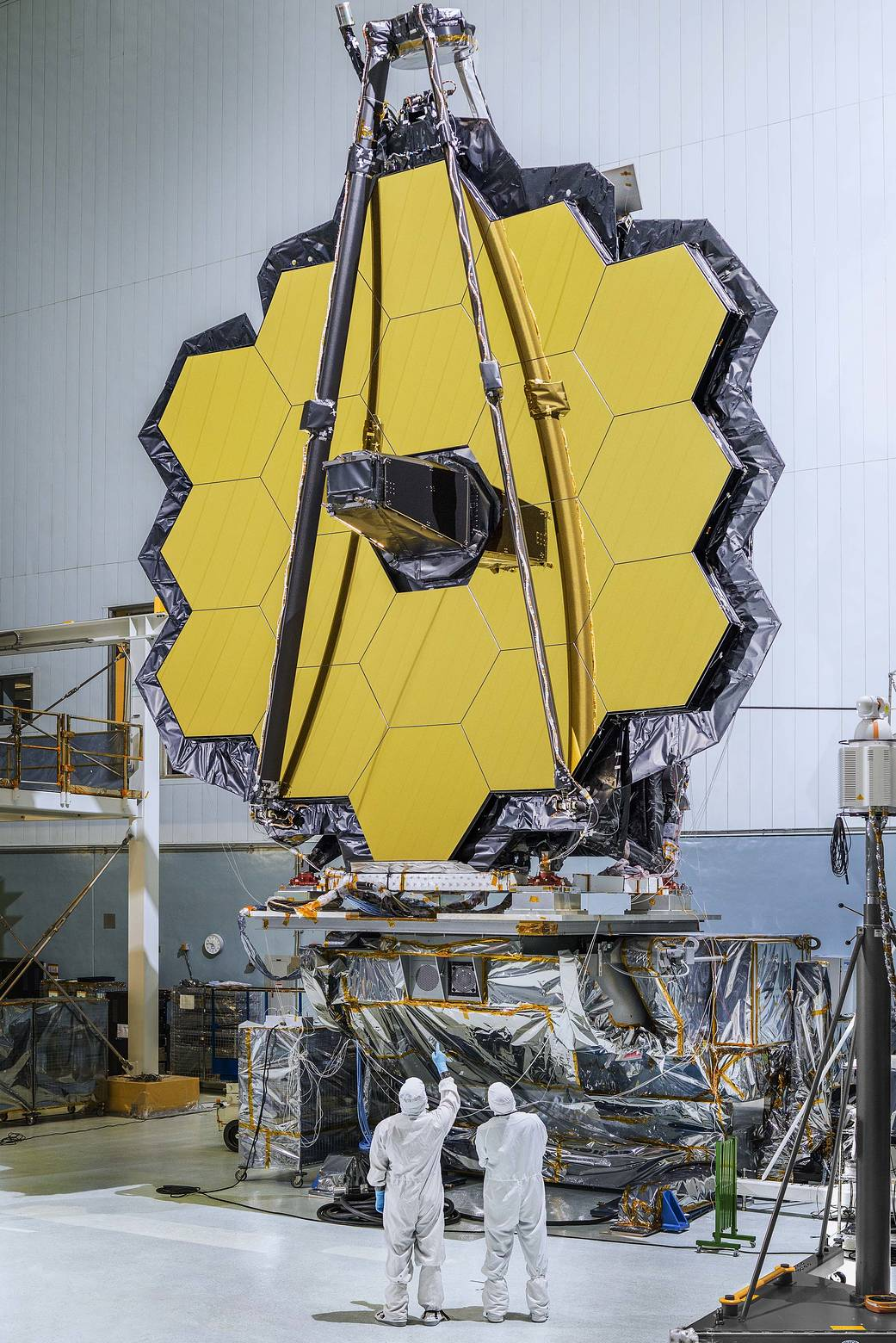
Main mirror assembly from the front with primary mirrors attached, November 2016

Diffraction spikes due to mirror segments and spider color-coded

Webb's primary mirror is a 6.5 m (21 ft)-diameter gold-coated beryllium reflector with a collecting area of 25.4 m^{2} (273 sq ft). If it had been designed as a single, large mirror, it would have been too large for existing launch vehicles. The mirror is therefore composed of 18 hexagonal segments (a technique pioneered by Guido Horn d'Arturo), which unfolded after the telescope was launched. Image plane wavefront sensing via phase retrieval is used to position the mirror segments at the correct locations using precise actuators. After this initial configuration, they only need occasional updates every few days to maintain optimal focus. This is unlike terrestrial telescopes, for example the Keck telescopes, which must continually adjust their mirror segments using active optics to overcome the effects of gravitational and wind loading. The Webb telescope uses 132 small actuation motors to position and adjust the optics. The actuators can position the mirror with 10 nanometer accuracy.

Webb's optical design is a three-mirror anastigmat, which makes use of curved secondary and tertiary mirrors to deliver images that are free from optical aberrations over a wide field. The secondary mirror is 0.74 m (2.4 ft) in diameter. In addition, there is a fine steering mirror which can adjust its position many times per second to provide image stabilization. Point light sources in images taken by Webb have six diffraction spikes plus two fainter ones, due to the hexagonal shape of the primary mirror segments.

=== Scientific instruments ===
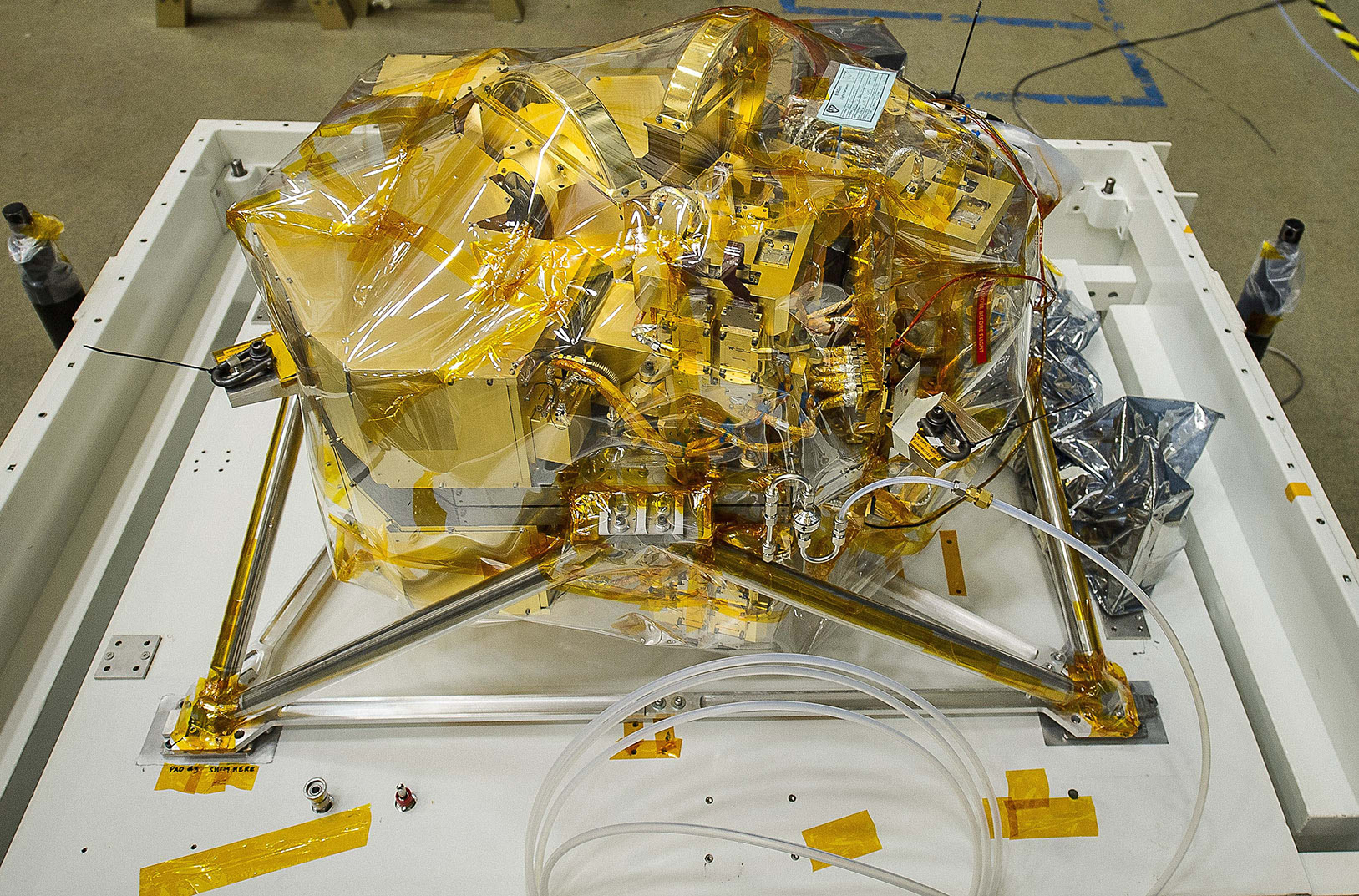
NIRCam wrapped up in 2013

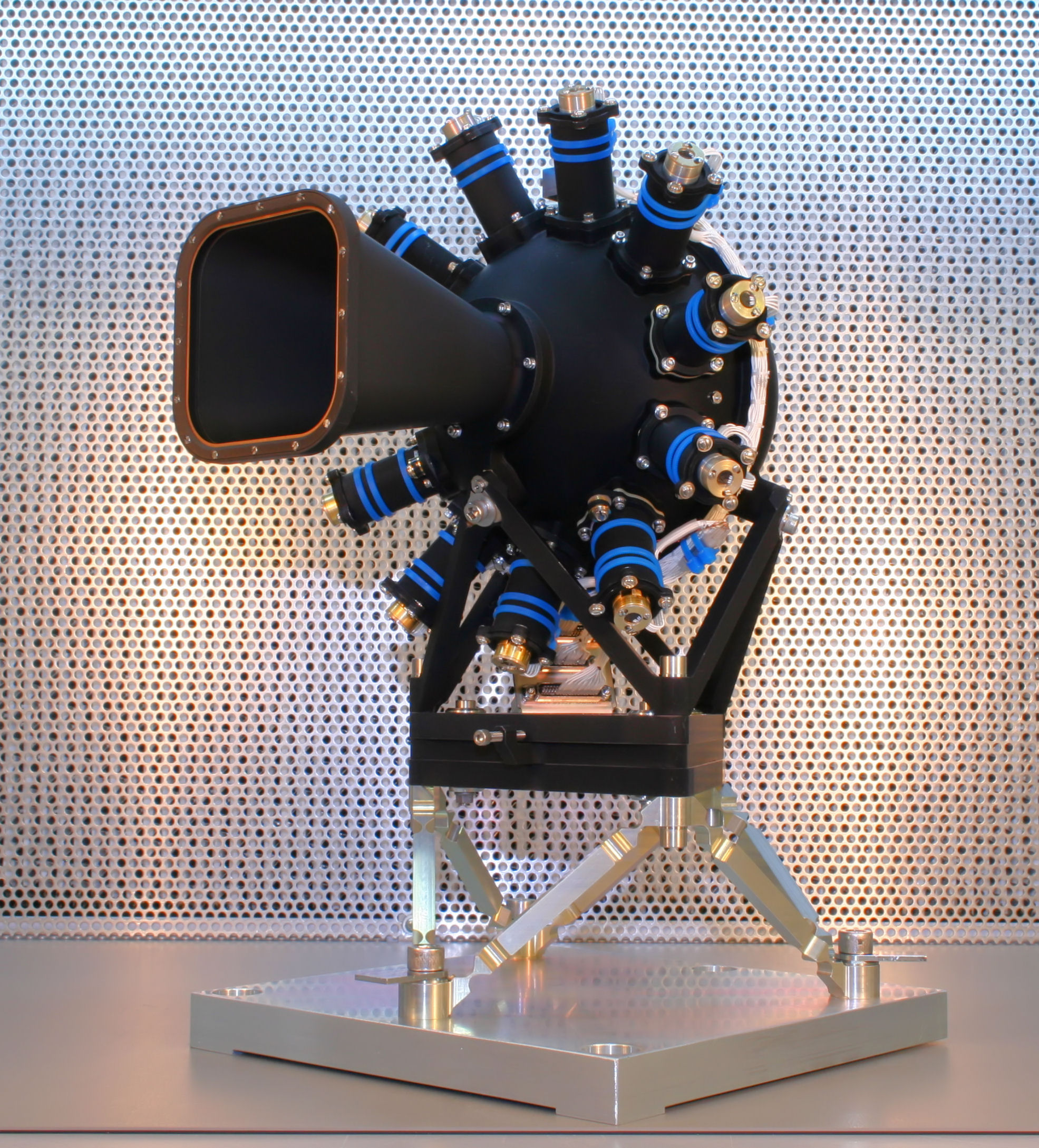
The Calibration Assembly, one component of the NIRSpec instrument

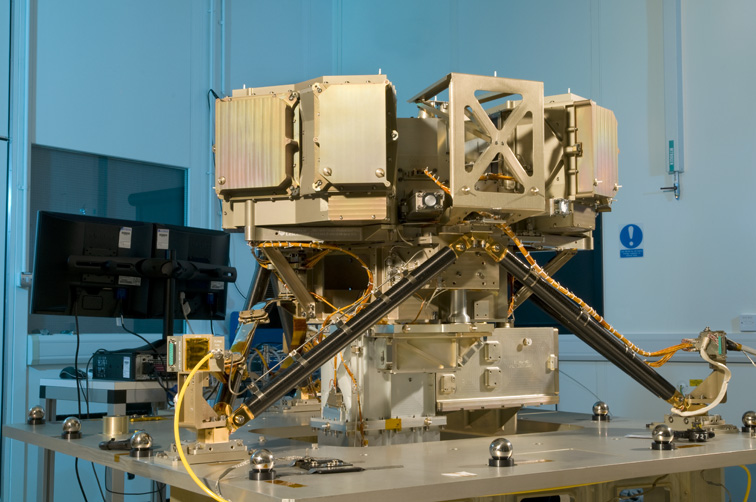
MIRI

The Integrated Science Instrument Module (ISIM) is a framework that provides electrical power, computing resources, cooling capability, and structural stability to the Webb telescope. It is made with a bonded graphite-epoxy composite attached to the underside of Webb's telescope structure. The ISIM holds the four science instruments and a guide camera.

- NIRCam (Near Infrared Camera) is an infrared imager which has spectral coverage ranging from the edge of the visible (0.6 μm) through to the near infrared (5 μm). There are 10 sensors each of 4 megapixels. NIRCam serves as the observatory's wavefront sensor, required for wavefront sensing and control activities that align and focus the main mirror segments. NIRCam was built by a team led by the University of Arizona, with principal investigator Marcia J. Rieke.
- NIRSpec (Near Infrared Spectrograph) performs spectroscopy over the same wavelength range. It was built by the European Space Agency (ESA) at ESTEC in Noordwijk, Netherlands. The leading development team includes members from Airbus Defence and Space in Ottobrunn and Friedrichshafen, Germany, and the Goddard Space Flight Center, with Pierre Ferruit (École normale supérieure de Lyon) as NIRSpec project scientist. The NIRSpec design provides three observing modes: a low-resolution prism mode, an R~1000 multi-object mode, and an R~2700 integral-field unit or long-slit spectroscopy mode. Mode switching is performed by operating a wavelength preselection mechanism, the Filter Wheel Assembly, and selecting a corresponding dispersive element (prism or grating) using the Grating Wheel Assembly. Both mechanisms are based on the successful ISOPHOT wheel mechanisms of the Infrared Space Observatory. The multi-object mode relies on a complex microshutter mechanism to enable simultaneous observations of hundreds of individual objects across NIRSpec's field of view. There are two sensors, each of 4 megapixels.
- MIRI (Mid-Infrared Instrument) measures the mid-to-long-infrared wavelength range from 5 to 27 μm. It contains both a mid-infrared camera and an imaging spectrometer. MIRI was developed as a collaboration between NASA and a consortium of European countries, and is led by George Rieke (University of Arizona) and Gillian Wright (UK Astronomy Technology Centre, Edinburgh, Scotland). The temperature of the MIRI must not exceed 6 K (−267 °C; −449 °F): a helium gas mechanical cooler sited on the warm side of the environmental shield provides this cooling.
- FGS/NIRISS (Fine Guidance Sensor and Near Infrared Imager and Slitless Spectrograph), led by the Canadian Space Agency (CSA) under project scientist John Hutchings (Herzberg Astronomy and Astrophysics Research Centre), is used to stabilize the line-of-sight of the observatory during science observations. Measurements from the FGS are used both to control the spacecraft's overall orientation and to drive the fine steering mirror for image stabilization. The CSA also provided a Near Infrared Imager and Slitless Spectrograph (NIRISS) module for astronomical imaging and spectroscopy in the 0.8 to 5 μm wavelength range, led by principal investigator René Doyon at the Université de Montréal. Although they are often referred together as a unit, the NIRISS and FGS serve entirely different purposes, with one being a scientific instrument. The other is a part of the observatory's support infrastructure.

NIRCam and MIRI feature starlight-blocking coronagraphs for observation of faint targets such as extrasolar planets and circumstellar disks very close to bright stars.

=== Spacecraft bus ===
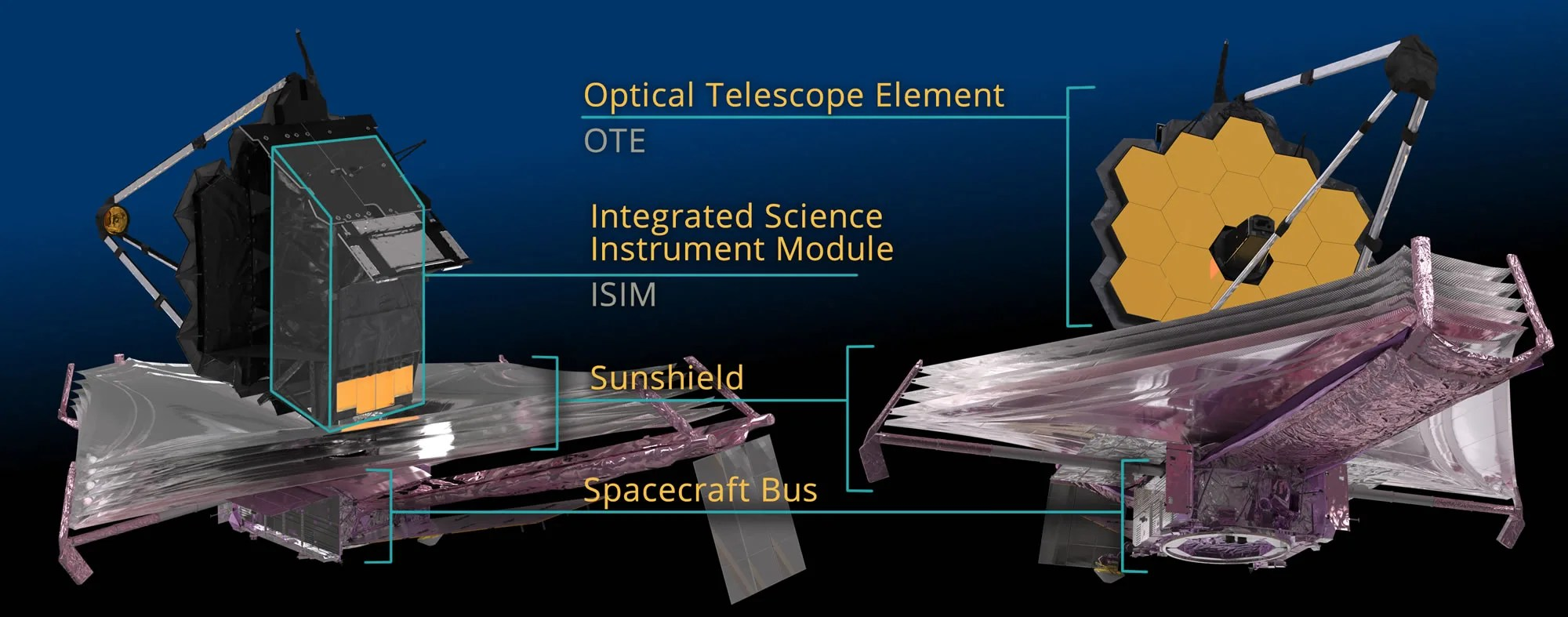
JWST major components: spacecraft bus, sunshield, Optical Telescope Element (OTE), and the Integrated Science Instrument Module (ISIM)

The spacecraft bus is the primary support component of the JWST, hosting a multitude of subsystems for computing, communications, electrical power, propulsion, and structure. Along with the sunshield, it forms the spacecraft element of the space telescope. The spacecraft bus is on the Sun-facing "warm" side of the sunshield and operates at a temperature of about 300 K (27 °C; 80 °F).

The spacecraft bus has a mass of 350 kg (770 lb) and must support the 6,200 kg (13,700 lb) space telescope. It is primarily made of a graphite composite material. The assembly was completed in California in 2015. It was integrated with the rest of the space telescope, leading to its 2021 launch. The spacecraft bus can rotate the telescope with pointing precision of one arcsecond and isolates vibration to 2 milliarcseconds.

Webb has two pairs of rocket engines (one pair for redundancy) to make course corrections on the way to L_{2} and for station keeping – maintaining the correct position in the halo orbit. Eight smaller thrusters are used for attitude control – the correct pointing of the spacecraft. The engines use hydrazine fuel (159 liters or 42 U.S. gallons at launch) and dinitrogen tetroxide as oxidizer (79.5 liters or 21.0 U.S. gallons at launch).

=== Servicing ===
Webb is not intended to be serviced in space. A crewed mission to repair or upgrade the observatory, as was done for Hubble, would not be possible, and according to NASA Associate Administrator Thomas Zurbuchen, despite best efforts, an uncrewed remote mission was found to be beyond available technology at the time Webb was designed. During the long Webb testing period, NASA officials referred to the idea of a servicing mission, but no plans were announced. Since the successful launch, NASA has stated that nevertheless limited accommodation was made to facilitate future servicing missions. These accommodations included precise guidance markers in the form of crosses on the surface of Webb, for use by remote servicing missions, as well as refillable fuel tanks, removable heat protectors, and accessible attachment points.

=== Software ===
Webb uses a modified version of JavaScript, called Nombas ScriptEase 5.00e, for its operations; it follows the ECMAScript standard and "allows for a modular design flow, where on-board scripts call lower-level scripts that are defined as functions". Furthermore, "The script interpreter is run by the flight software, which is written in C++. The flight software operates the spacecraft and the science instruments."

== Comparison with other telescopes ==
Comparison with the Hubble Space Telescope primary mirror

Primary mirror size comparison between Webb and Hubble

The desire for a large infrared space telescope is decades old. In the United States, the Space Infrared Telescope Facility (later called the Spitzer Space Telescope) was planned while the Space Shuttle was in development, and the potential for infrared astronomy was acknowledged at that time. Unlike ground telescopes, space observatories are free from atmospheric absorption of infrared light. Space observatories opened a "new sky" for astronomers.

However, there is a challenge in the design of infrared telescopes: they must remain extremely cold, and the longer the wavelength of infrared light, the colder they must be. If not, the device's background heat overwhelms the detectors, effectively rendering it blind. This can be overcome by careful design. One method is to put the key instruments in a dewar with an icy substance, such as liquid helium. The coolant will slowly vaporize, limiting the instrument's lifetime to as short as a few months or as long as a few years.

It is also possible to maintain a low temperature by designing the spacecraft to enable near-infrared observations without coolant, as with the extended missions of the Spitzer Space Telescope and the Wide-field Infrared Survey Explorer, which operated at reduced capacity after coolant depletion. Another example is Hubble's Near Infrared Camera and Multi-Object Spectrometer (NICMOS) instrument, which started out using a block of nitrogen ice that depleted after a couple of years, but was then replaced during the STS-109 servicing mission with a cryocooler that worked continuously. The Webb Space Telescope is designed to cool itself without a dewar, using a combination of sunshields and radiators, with the mid-infrared instrument using an additional cryocooler.

Selected space telescopes and instruments
Name	Launch year	Wavelength (μm)	Aperture (m)	Cooling
Spacelab Infrared Telescope (IRT)	1985	1.7–118	0.15	Helium
Infrared Space Observatory (ISO)	1995	2.5–240	0.60	Helium
Hubble Space Telescope Imaging Spectrograph (STIS)	1997	0.115–1.03	2.4	Passive
Hubble Near Infrared Camera and Multi-Object Spectrometer (NICMOS)	1997	0.8–2.4	2.4	Nitrogen, later cryocooler
Spitzer Space Telescope	2003	3–180	0.85	Helium
Hubble Wide Field Camera 3 (WFC3)	2009	0.2–1.7	2.4	Passive and thermo-electric
Herschel Space Observatory	2009	55–672	3.5	Helium
James Webb Space Telescope	2021	0.6–28.5	6.5	Passive and cryocooler (MIRI)

Webb's delays and cost increases have been compared to those of its predecessor, the Hubble Space Telescope. When Hubble formally began in 1972, it had an estimated development cost of US$300 million (equivalent to $2.309069×10^{9} in 2025), but by the time it was launched in 1990, the cost was about four times that. In addition, new instruments and servicing missions increased the price to at least US$9 billion by 2006 (equivalent to $1.4373556×10^{10} in 2025).

== Development history ==
=== Background (development to 2003) ===
Major milestones
Year	Milestone
1996	Next Generation Space Telescope project first proposed (mirror size: 8 m)
2001	NEXUS Space Telescope, a precursor to the Next Generation Space Telescope, cancelled
2002	Proposed project renamed James Webb Space Telescope, (mirror size reduced to 6 m)
2003	Northrop Grumman awarded contract to build telescope
2007	Memorandum of Understanding signed between NASA and ESA
2010	Mission Critical Design Review (MCDR) passed
2011	Proposed cancellation
2016	Final assembly completed
25 Dec 2021	Launch

Discussions of a Hubble follow-on started in the 1980s, but serious planning began in the early 1990s. The Hi-Z telescope concept was developed between 1989 and 1994: a fully baffled (Note: "Baffled", in this context, means enclosed in a tube in a similar manner to a conventional optical telescope, which helps to stop stray light entering the telescope from the side. For an actual example, see the following link: Freniere, E.R. (1981). "First-order design of optical baffles". Society of Photo-Optical Instrumentation Engineers (SPIE) Conference Series, First-order design of optical baffles. Radiation Scattering in Optical Systems. Vol. 257. pp. 19–28. Bibcode:1981SPIE..257...19F. doi:10.1117/12.959598.) 4 m (13 ft) aperture infrared telescope that would recede to an orbit at 3 astronomical unit (AU). This distant orbit would have benefited from reduced light noise from zodiacal dust. Other early plans called for a NEXUS precursor telescope mission.

Correcting the flawed optics of the Hubble Space Telescope (HST) in its first years played a significant role in the birth of Webb. In 1993, NASA conducted STS-61, the Space Shuttle mission that replaced HST's camera and installed a retrofit for its imaging spectrograph to compensate for the spherical aberration in its primary mirror.

The HST & Beyond Committee was formed in 1994 "to study possible missions and programs for optical-ultraviolet astronomy in space for the first decades of the 21st century". Emboldened by HST's success, its 1996 report explored the concept of a larger and much colder, infrared-sensitive telescope that could reach back in cosmic time to the birth of the first galaxies. This high-priority science goal was beyond the HST's capability because, as a warm telescope, it is blinded by infrared emission from its own optical system. In addition to recommendations to extend the HST mission to 2005 and to develop technologies for finding planets around other stars, NASA embraced the chief recommendation of HST & Beyond for a large, cold space telescope (radiatively cooled far below 0 °C), and began the planning process for the future Webb telescope.

Preparation for the 2000 Astronomy and Astrophysics Decadal Survey (a literature review produced by the United States National Research Council that includes identifying research priorities and making recommendations for the upcoming decade) included further development of the scientific program for what became known as the Next Generation Space Telescope, and advancements in relevant technologies by NASA. As it matured, studying the birth of galaxies in the young universe and searching for planets around other stars – the prime goals coalesced into "Origins" by HST & Beyond becoming prominent.

As hoped, the NGST received the highest ranking in the 2000 Decadal Survey.

An administrator of NASA, Dan Goldin, coined the phrase "faster, better, cheaper", and opted for the next big paradigm shift for astronomy, namely, breaking the barrier of a single mirror. That meant going from "eliminate moving parts" to "learn to live with moving parts" (e.g., segmented optics). Seeking to reduce the mirror mass by a factor of 10, beryllium was selected as the mirror substrate because the metal is low density (1.845 g/cm^{3}), exceptionally stiff, and maintains a stable shape at cryogenic temperatures.

The mid-1990s era of "faster, better, cheaper" produced the NGST concept, with an 8 m (26 ft) aperture to be flown to L_{2}, roughly estimated to cost US$500 million. In 1997, NASA worked with the Goddard Space Flight Center, Ball Aerospace & Technologies, and TRW to conduct technical requirement and cost studies of the three different concepts, and in 1999 selected Lockheed Martin and TRW for preliminary concept studies. Launch was at that time planned for 2007, but the launch date was pushed back many times (see table further down).

In 2002, the project was renamed after NASA's second administrator (1961–1968), James E. Webb (1906–1992). Webb led the agency during the Apollo program and established scientific research as a core NASA activity.

In 2003, NASA awarded TRW the US$824.8 million prime contract for the Webb telescope. The design called for a de-scoped 6.1 m (20 ft) primary mirror and a launch date of 2010. Later that year, TRW was acquired by Northrop Grumman in a hostile bid and became Northrop Grumman Space Technology.

=== Early development and replanning (2003–2007) ===
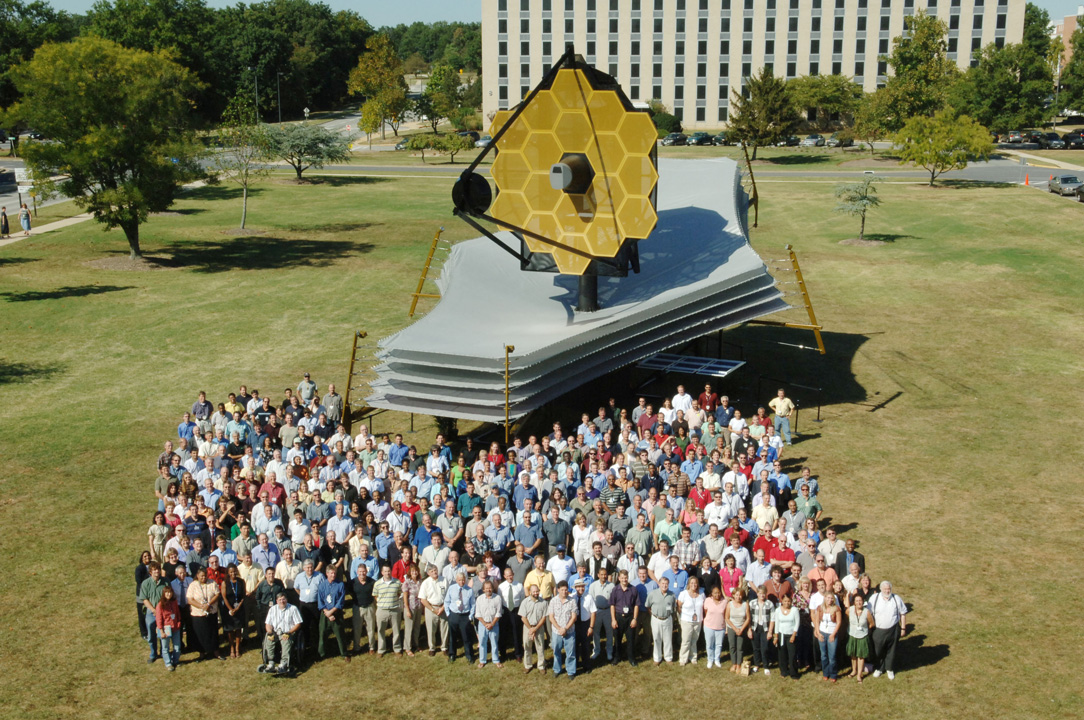
Early full-scale model on display at NASA Goddard Space Flight Center (2005)

Development was managed by NASA's Goddard Space Flight Center in Greenbelt, Maryland, with John C. Mather as its project scientist. The primary contractor was Northrop Grumman Aerospace Systems, responsible for developing and building the spacecraft element, which included the satellite bus, sunshield, Deployable Tower Assembly (DTA) which connects the Optical Telescope Element to the spacecraft bus, and the Mid Boom Assembly (MBA) which helps to deploy the large sunshields on orbit, while Ball Aerospace & Technologies was subcontracted to develop and build the OTE itself, and the Integrated Science Instrument Module (ISIM).

Cost growth revealed in spring 2005 led to a re-planning in August 2005. The primary technical outcomes of the re-planning were significant changes in the integration and test plans, a 22-month launch delay (from 2011 to 2013), and elimination of system-level testing for observatory modes at wavelengths shorter than 1.7 μm. Other major features of the observatory were unchanged. Following the re-planning, the project was independently reviewed in April 2006.

In the 2005 re-plan, the project's life-cycle cost was estimated at US$4.5 billion. This comprised approximately US$3.5 billion for design, development, launch, and commissioning, and approximately US$1.0 billion for ten years of operations. The ESA agreed in 2004 to contributing about €300 million, including the launch. The CSA pledged CA$39 million in 2007 and in 2012 delivered its contributions in equipment to point the telescope and detect atmospheric conditions on distant planets.

=== Detailed design and construction (2007–2021) ===
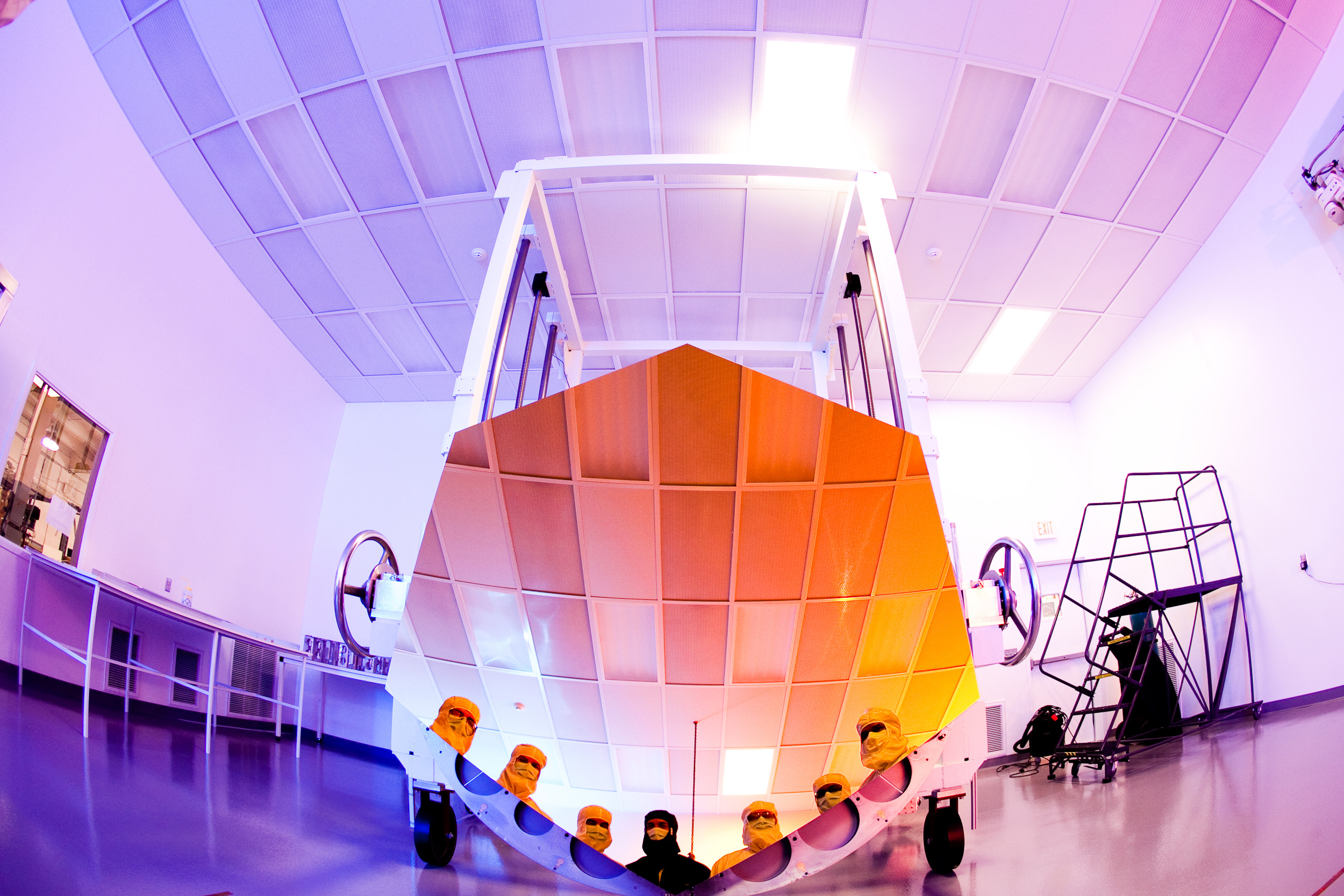
A JWST mirror segment, 2010

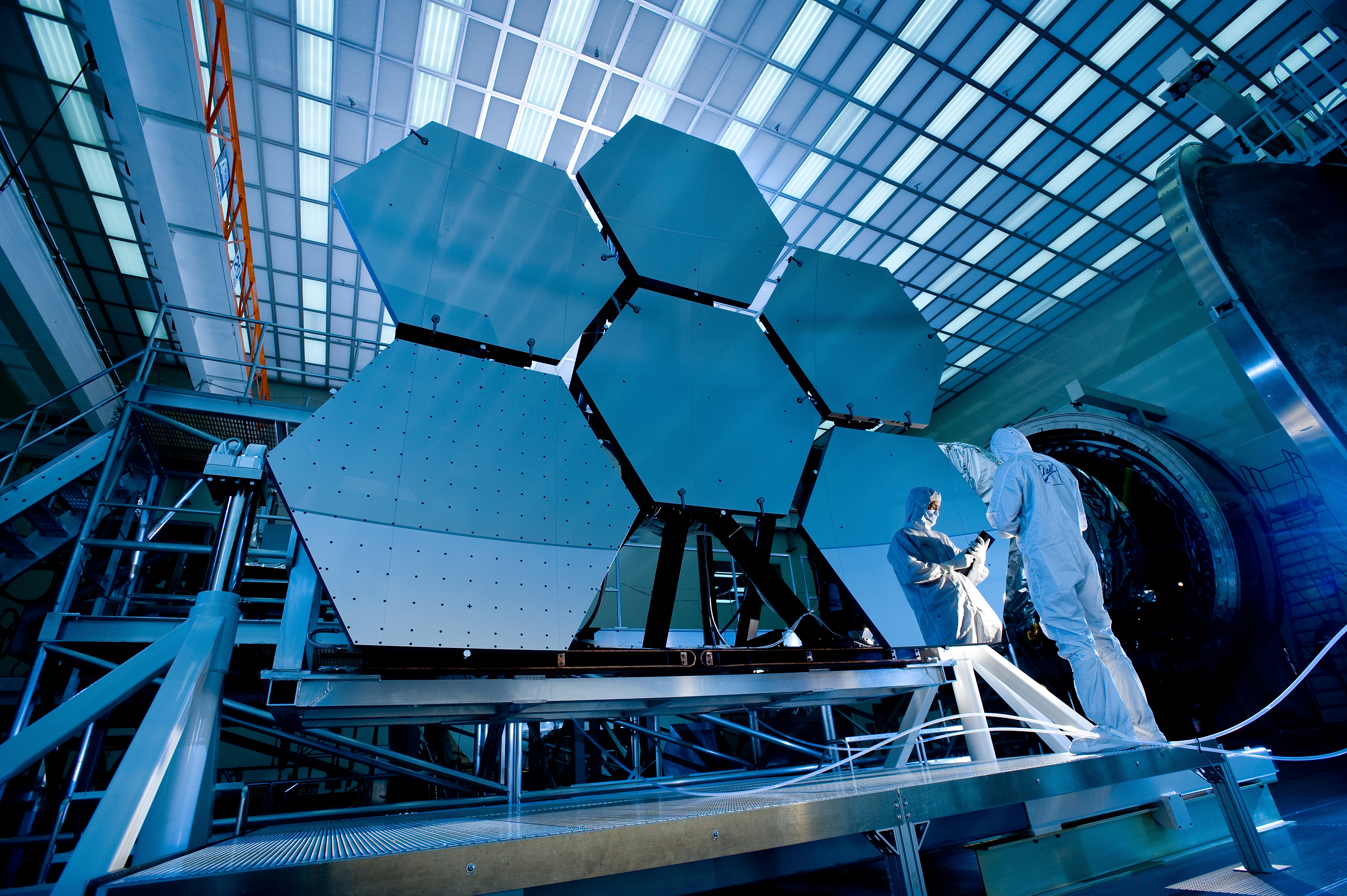
Mirror segments undergoing cryogenic tests at the X-ray & Cryogenic Facility at Marshall Space Flight Center

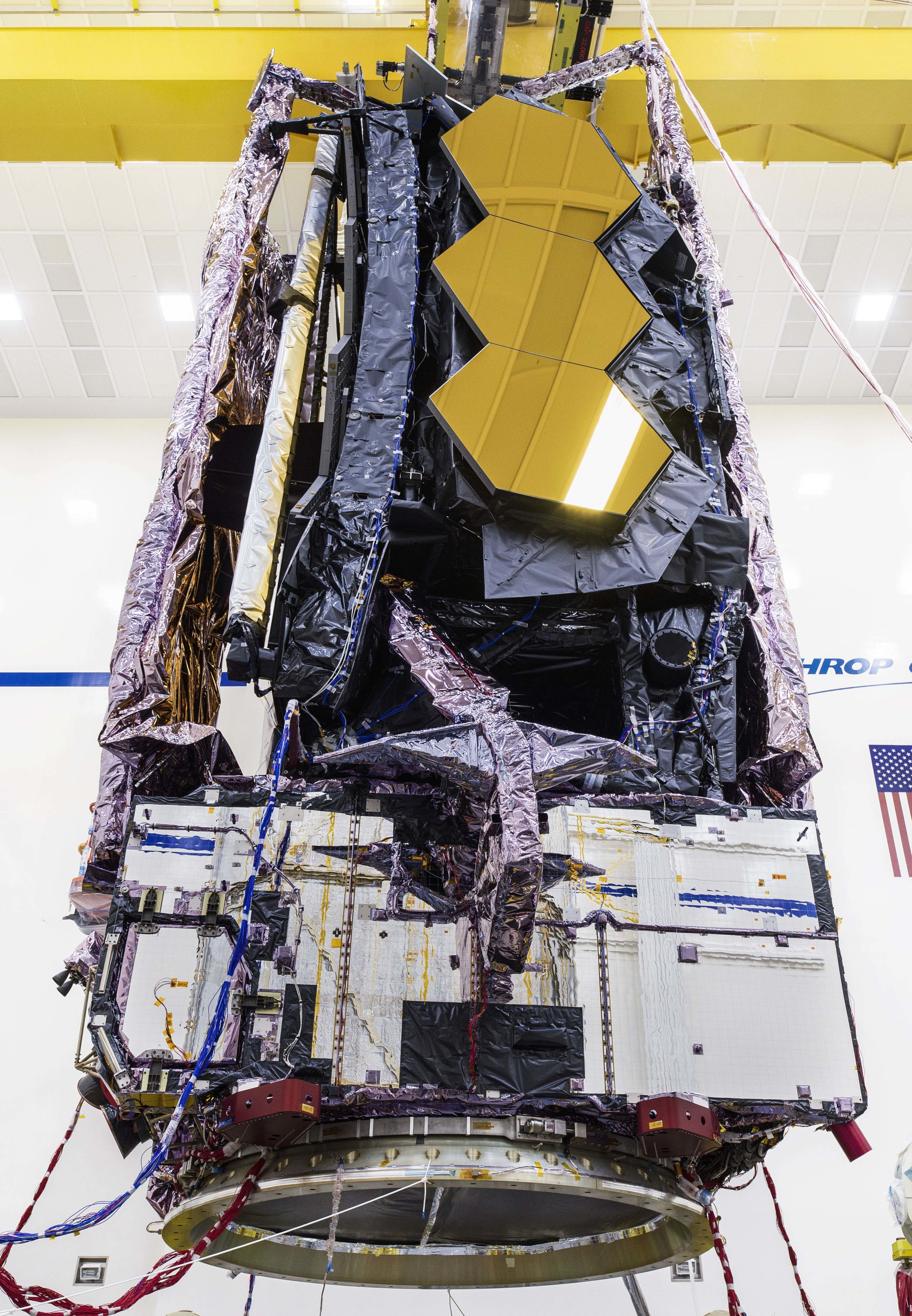
The assembled telescope following environmental testing

In January 2007, nine of the ten technology development items in the project successfully passed a Non-Advocate Review. These technologies were deemed sufficiently mature to mitigate significant risks in the project. The remaining technology development item (the MIRI cryocooler) completed its technology maturation milestone in April 2007. This technology review represented the beginning step in the process that ultimately moved the project into its detailed design phase (Phase C). By May 2007, costs were still on target. In March 2008, the project completed its Preliminary Design Review (PDR). In April 2008, the project passed the Non-Advocate Review. Other past reviews include the Integrated Science Instrument Module review in March 2009, the Optical Telescope Element review completed in October 2009, and the Sunshield review completed in January 2010.

In April 2010, the telescope passed the technical portion of its Mission Critical Design Review (MCDR). Passing the MCDR signified that the integrated observatory could meet all science and engineering requirements for its mission. The MCDR encompassed all previous design reviews. The project schedule underwent review during the months following the MCDR through the Independent Comprehensive Review Panel, which led to a re-plan of the mission aiming for a 2015 launch, but it was not until 2018. By 2010, cost overruns were impacting other projects, though Webb itself remained on schedule.

By 2011, the Webb project was in the final design and fabrication phase (Phase C).

Assembly of the hexagonal segments of the primary mirror, which was done via robotic arm, began in November 2015 and was completed on 3 February 2016. The secondary mirror was installed on 3 March 2016. Final construction of the Webb telescope was completed in November 2016, after which extensive testing procedures began.

In March 2018, NASA delayed Webb's launch by an additional 2 years to May 2020 after the telescope's sunshield ripped during a practice deployment, and its cables did not sufficiently tighten. In June 2018, NASA delayed the launch by an additional 10 months to March 2021, based on the independent review board's assessment following the failed March 2018 test deployment. The review identified that Webb launch and deployment had 344 potential single-point failures – tasks that had no alternative or means of recovery if unsuccessful, and therefore had to succeed for the telescope to work. In August 2019, the mechanical integration of the telescope was completed, something that was scheduled to be done 12 years before in 2007.

After construction was completed, Webb underwent final tests at Northrop Grumman's historic Space Park in Redondo Beach, California. A ship carrying the telescope left California on 26 September 2021, passed through the Panama Canal, and arrived in French Guiana on 12 October 2021.

=== Cost and schedule issues ===
NASA's lifetime cost for the project is expected to be US$9.7 billion, of which US$8.8 billion was spent on spacecraft design and development, and US$861 million is planned to support five years of mission operations. Representatives from ESA and CSA stated their project contributions amount to approximately €700 million and CA$200 million, respectively.

A 1984 study by the Space Science Board estimated that building a next-generation infrared observatory in orbit would cost US$4 billion (US$7B in 2006 dollars, or US$ 10B in 2020 dollars). While this came close to the final cost of Webb, the first NASA design considered in the late 1990s was more modest, aiming for a $1 billion price tag over 10 years of construction. Over time, this design expanded, added funding for contingencies, and had scheduling delays.

Progression of estimates for schedule and cost, along with major milestones
Year	Planned launch	Budget plan (billion USD)
1998	2007	1
2000	2009	1.8
2002	2010	2.5
2003	2011	2.5
2005	2013	3
2006	2014	4.5
2008: Preliminary Design Review
2008	2014	5.1
2010: Critical Design Review
2010	2015 to 2016	6.5
2011	2018	8.7
2017	2019	8.8
2018	2020	≥8.8
2019	March 2021	9.66
2021	Dec 2021	9.70

By 2008, when the project entered preliminary design review and was formally confirmed for construction, over US$1 billion had already been spent on developing the telescope, and the total budget was estimated at US$5 billion (equivalent to $8.24 billion in 2025). In summer 2010, the mission passed its Critical Design Review (CDR) with excellent grades on all technical matters. Still, schedule and cost slips at that time prompted Maryland U.S. Senator Barbara Mikulski to call for an external review of the project. The Independent Comprehensive Review Panel (ICRP), chaired by J. Casani (JPL), found that the earliest possible launch date was late 2015, at an additional cost of US$1.5 billion (bringing the total to US$6.5 billion). They also noted that this would have required additional funding in FY2011 and FY2012, and that a later launch date would result in a higher total cost.

On 6 July 2011, the United States House of Representatives' appropriations committee on Commerce, Justice, and Science moved to cancel the James Webb project by proposing an FY2012 budget that removed US$1.9 billion from NASA's overall budget, of which roughly one quarter was for Webb. US$3 billion had been spent and 75% of its hardware was in production. This budget proposal was approved by subcommittee vote the following day. The committee charged that the project was "billions of dollars over budget and plagued by poor management". In response, the American Astronomical Society stated support of Webb, as did Senator Mikulski. A number of editorials supporting Webb appeared in the international press during 2011 as well. In November 2011, Congress reversed plans to cancel Webb and instead capped additional funding to complete the project at US$8 billion.

While similar issues had affected other major NASA projects such as the Hubble telescope, some scientists expressed concerns about growing costs and schedule delays for the Webb telescope, worrying that its budget might be competing with those of other space science programs. A 2010 Nature article described Webb as "the telescope that ate astronomy". NASA continued to defend the budget and timeline of the program to Congress.

In 2018, Gregory L. Robinson was appointed as the new director of the Webb program. Robinson was credited with raising the program's schedule efficiency (how many measures were completed on time) from 50% to 95%. For his role in improving the performance of the Webb program, Robinsons's supervisor, Thomas Zurbuchen, called him "the most effective leader of a mission I have ever seen in the history of NASA". In July 2022, after Webb's commissioning process was complete and it began transmitting its first data, Robinson retired following a 33-year career at NASA.

On 27 March 2018, NASA pushed back the launch to May 2020 or later, with a final cost estimate to come after a new launch window was determined with the ESA. In 2019, its mission cost cap was increased by US$800 million. After launch windows were paused in 2020 due to the COVID-19 pandemic, Webb was launched at the end of 2021, with a total cost of just under US$10 billion.

No single area drove the cost. For future large telescopes, there are five major areas critical to controlling overall cost:

- System complexity
- Critical path and overhead
- Verification challenges
- Programmatic constraints
- Early integration and test considerations

=== Partnership ===
NASA, ESA, and CSA have collaborated on the telescope since 1996. ESA's participation in construction and launch was approved by its members in 2003, and an agreement was signed between ESA and NASA in 2007. In exchange for full partnership, representation, and access to the observatory for its astronomers, ESA provided the NIRSpec instrument, the Optical Bench Assembly of the MIRI instrument, an Ariane 5 ECA launcher, and a workforce to support operations. The CSA provided the Fine Guidance Sensor and the Near-Infrared Imager Slitless Spectrograph and workforce to support operations.

Several thousand scientists, engineers, and technicians spanning 15 countries have contributed to the build, test, and integration of Webb. A total of 258 companies, government agencies, and academic institutions participated in the pre-launch project; 142 from the United States, 104 from 12 European countries (including 21 from the U.K., 16 from France, 12 from Germany and 7 international), and 12 from Canada. Other countries as NASA partners, such as Australia, were involved in post-launch operation.

Participating countries:

- Austria
- Belgium
- Canada
- Czech Republic
- Denmark
- Finland
- France
- Germany
- Greece
- Ireland
- Italy
- Luxembourg
- Netherlands
- Norway
- Portugal
- Spain
- Sweden
- Switzerland
- United Kingdom
- United States

=== Naming concerns ===
In 2002, NASA administrator (2001–2004) Sean O'Keefe decided to name the telescope after James E. Webb, the administrator of NASA from 1961 to 1968 during the Mercury, Gemini, and much of the Apollo programs.

In 2015, concerns were raised around Webb's possible role in the lavender scare, the mid-20th-century persecution by the U.S. government targeting homosexuals in federal employment. A group of scientists published an opinion piece in Scientific American that proposed renaming the telescope after abolitionist and social activist Harriet Tubman, and the Human Rights Campaign and GLADD suggested that the telescope instead be named for Sally Ride, the first American woman and the first lesbian woman in space. In 2021, NASA released a statement that they had "found no evidence at this time that warrants changing the name", prompting one of the authors of the Scientific American piece to resign from the NASA Astrophysics Advisory Committee, and another to say they would only refer to the telescope as the "Just Wonderful Space Telescope". In 2022, NASA released the full report of an investigation, based on an examination of more than 50,000 documents, that found that "no available evidence directly links Webb to any actions or follow-up related to the firing of individuals for their sexual orientation", either in his time in the State Department or at NASA.

== Mission goals ==
The James Webb Space Telescope has four key goals:

- to search for light from the first stars and galaxies that formed in the universe after the Big Bang
- to study galaxy formation and evolution
- to understand star formation and planet formation
- to study planetary systems and the origins of life

These goals can be achieved more effectively through near-infrared observation rather than in the visible spectrum. For this reason, Webb's instruments will not measure visible or ultraviolet light like the Hubble Telescope, but will have a much greater capacity to perform infrared astronomy. Webb will be sensitive to a range of wavelengths from 0.6 to 28 μm (corresponding respectively to orange light and deep infrared radiation at about 100 K or −173 °C).

Webb may be used to gather information on the dimming of the star KIC 8462852, which was discovered in 2015 and shows some abnormal light-curve properties.

Additionally, it will be able to tell if an exoplanet has methane in its atmosphere, allowing astronomers to determine whether or not the methane is a biosignature.

=== Orbit design ===
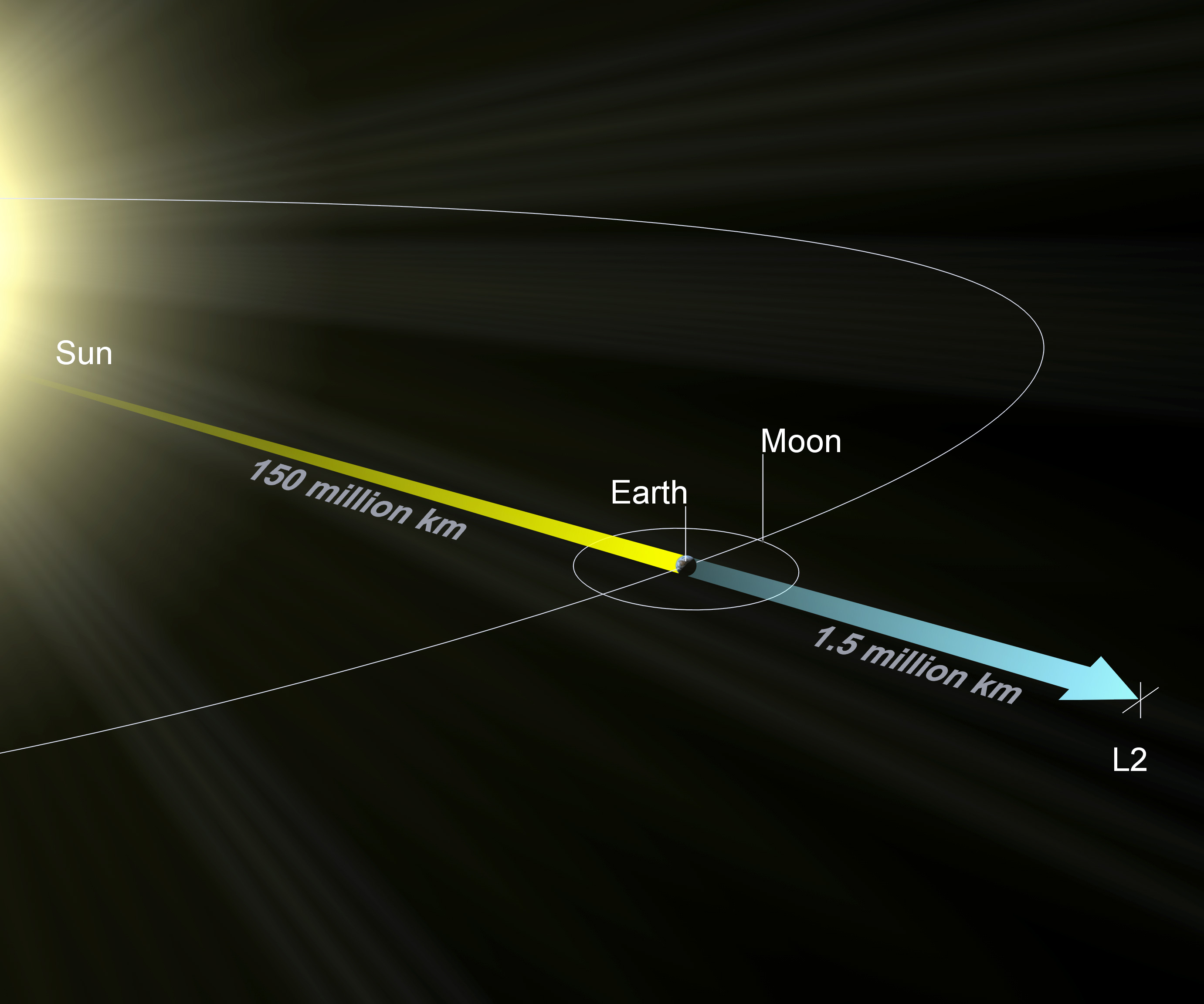
Webb is not exactly at the L_{2} point, but circles around it in a halo orbit.

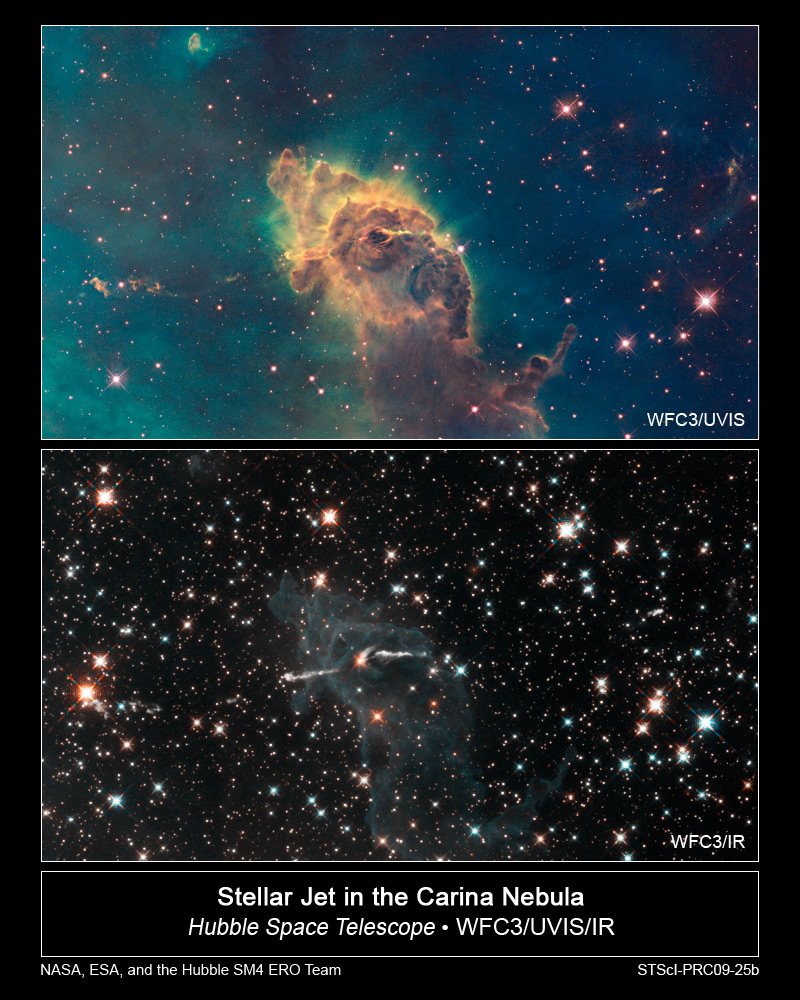
Alternative Hubble Space Telescope views of the Carina Nebula, comparing ultraviolet and visible (top) and infrared (bottom) astronomy. Far more stars are visible in the latter.

Webb orbits the Sun near the second Lagrange point (L_{2}) of the Sun–Earth system, which is 1,500,000 km (930,000 mi) farther from the Sun than the Earth's orbit, and about four times farther than the Moon's orbit. Usually, an object circling the Sun farther out than Earth would take longer than one year to complete its orbit. But near the L_{2} point, the combined gravitational pull of the Earth and the Sun allows a spacecraft to orbit the Sun in the same time it takes the Earth to orbit the Sun. Staying close to Earth allows much higher data rates for a given antenna size.

The telescope circles about the Sun–Earth L_{2} point in a halo orbit, which is inclined with respect to the ecliptic, has a radius varying between about 250,000 km (160,000 mi) and 832,000 km (517,000 mi), and takes about half a year to complete. Since L_{2} is just an equilibrium point with no gravitational pull, a halo orbit is not an orbit in the usual sense: the spacecraft is actually in orbit around the Sun. The halo orbit can be thought of as controlled drifting to remain in the vicinity of the L_{2} point. This requires some station-keeping: around 2.5 m/s per year from the total ∆v budget of 93 m/s. Two sets of thrusters constitute the observatory's propulsion system. Because the thrusters are located solely on the Sun-facing side of the observatory, all station-keeping operations are designed to slightly undershoot the required amount of thrust in order to avoid pushing Webb beyond the semi-stable L_{2} point, a situation which would be unrecoverable. Randy Kimble, the Integration and Test Project Scientist for the JWST, compared the precise station-keeping of Webb to "Sisyphus [...] rolling this rock up the gentle slope near the top of the hill – we never want it to roll over the crest and get away from him".

Animation of James Webb Space Telescope trajectory

Top view

Side view

Side view from the Sun

James Webb Space Telescope · Earth · L_{2} point

=== Infrared astronomy ===
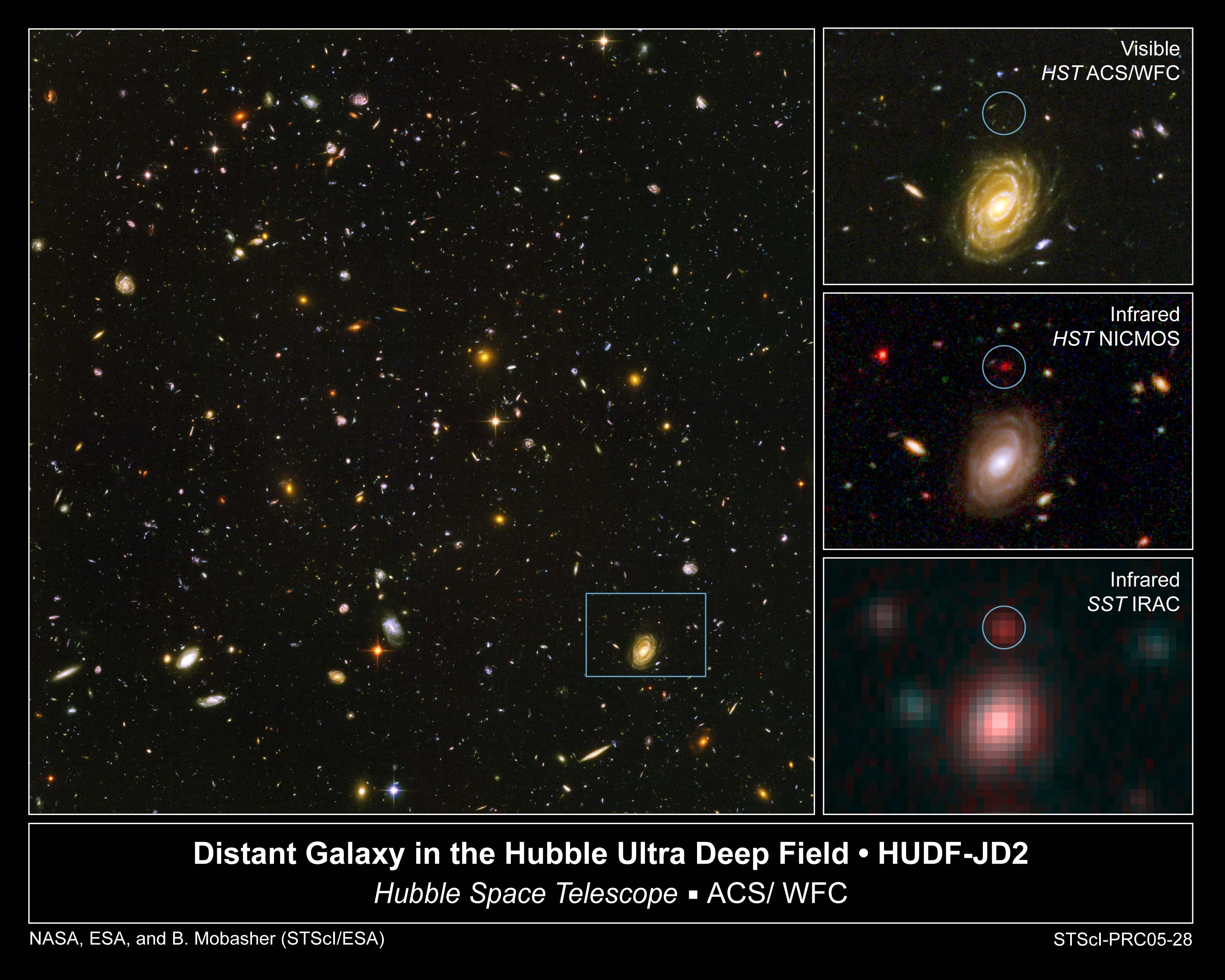
Infrared observations can see objects hidden in visible light, such as the HUDF-JD2 shown here.

Atmospheric windows in the infrared: Much of this type of light is blocked when viewed from the Earth's surface. It would be like looking at a rainbow but only seeing one color.

Webb is the formal successor to the Hubble Space Telescope (HST), and since its primary emphasis is on infrared astronomy, it is also a successor to the Spitzer Space Telescope. Webb will far surpass both those telescopes, enabling it to see many more, and much older, stars and galaxies. Observing in the infrared spectrum is a key technique for achieving this, because of cosmological redshift, and because it better penetrates obscuring dust and gas. This allows observation of dimmer, cooler objects. Since water vapor and carbon dioxide in Earth's atmosphere strongly absorb most infrared radiation, ground-based infrared astronomy is limited to narrow wavelength ranges where the atmosphere absorbs less strongly. Additionally, the atmosphere itself radiates in the infrared, often overwhelming the light from the observed object. This makes a space telescope preferable for infrared observation.

The more distant an object is, the younger it appears; its light has taken longer to reach human observers. Because the universe is expanding, as light travels, it becomes redshifted, and objects at great distances are therefore easier to see in the infrared. Webb's infrared capabilities are expected to let it see back in time to the first galaxies forming just a few hundred million years after the Big Bang.

Infrared radiation can pass more freely through regions of cosmic dust that scatter visible light. Observations in infrared allow the study of objects and regions of space which would be obscured by gas and dust in the visible spectrum, such as the molecular clouds where stars are born, the circumstellar disks that give rise to planets, and the cores of active galaxies.

Relatively calm objects (temperatures less than several thousand degrees) emit their radiation primarily in the infrared, as described by Planck's law. As a result, most objects that are cooler than stars are better studied in the infrared. This includes the clouds of the interstellar medium, brown dwarfs, planets both in our own and other solar systems, comets, and Kuiper belt objects that will be observed with the Mid-Infrared Instrument (MIRI).

Some of the missions in infrared astronomy that impacted Webb development were Spitzer and the Wilkinson Microwave Anisotropy Probe (WMAP). Spitzer showed the importance of mid-infrared, which is helpful for tasks such as observing dust disks around stars. Also, the WMAP probe showed the universe was "lit up" at redshift 17, further underscoring the importance of the mid-infrared. Both these missions were launched in the early 2000s, in time to influence Webb development.

== Ground support and operations ==
The Space Telescope Science Institute (STScI), in Baltimore, Maryland, on the Homewood Campus of Johns Hopkins University, was selected in 2003 as the Science and Operations Center (S&OC) for Webb with an initial budget of US$162.2 million intended to support operations through the first year after launch. In this capacity, STScI was to be responsible for the scientific operation of the telescope and delivery of data products to the astronomical community. Data was to be transmitted from Webb to the ground via the NASA Deep Space Network, processed and calibrated at STScI, and then distributed online to astronomers worldwide. As with Hubble, anyone, anywhere in the world, will be allowed to submit proposals for observations. Each year, several astronomy committees will peer review submitted proposals to select the projects to observe the following year. The authors of the selected proposals will typically have 1 year of private access to the new observations, after which the data will become publicly available for download from the STScI online archive.

The bandwidth and digital throughput of the satellite are designed to operate at 458 gigabits of data per day for the length of the mission (equivalent to a sustained rate of 5.42 Mbps). Most of the data processing on the telescope is done by conventional single-board computers. The digitization of the analog data from the instruments is performed by the custom SIDECAR ASIC (System for Image Digitization, Enhancement, Control And Retrieval Application Specific Integrated Circuit). NASA stated that the SIDECAR ASIC will include all the functions of a 9.1 kg (20 lb) instrument box in a 3 cm (1.2 in) package and consume only 11 milliwatts of power. Since this conversion must be done close to the detectors, on the cold side of the telescope, the low power dissipation is crucial for maintaining the low temperature required for optimal operation of Webb.

The telescope is equipped with a solid-state drive (SSD) with a capacity of 68 GB, used as temporary storage for data collected from its scientific instruments. By the end of the 10-year mission, the usable capacity of the drive is expected to decrease to 60 GB due to radiation and read/write operations.

=== Micrometeoroid strikes ===
The C3 (Note: The C3 mirror segment is positioned in the outer ring of segments, located at the '5 o'clock' number of a clock face, when viewing the primary mirror face-on.) mirror segment suffered a micrometeoroid strike from a large dust mote-sized particle between 23 and 25 May 2022, the fifth and largest strike since launch, reported 8 June 2022, which required engineers to compensate for the strike using a mirror actuator. Despite the strike, a NASA characterization report states "all JWST observing modes have been reviewed and confirmed to be ready for science use" as of 10 July 2022. (Note: Howell, Elizabeth (18 July 2022) James Webb Space Telescope picture shows noticeable damage from micrometeoroid strike cites a NASA-ESA-CSA joint report (12 July 2022) by 611 co-authors from 44 institutions.) Micrometeoroids strike Webb an average of once or twice per month, and only the May 2022 strike caused noticeable damage. After that strike, mission personnel implemented a strategy to change Webb's observations to reduce the risk of further damage. The strategy is to avoid pointing the mirror toward "micrometeoroid avoidance zones" at particular points along Webb's orbit.

== Launch and commissioning ==
=== Launch ===
The launch (designated Ariane flight VA256) took place as scheduled at 12:20 UTC on 25 December 2021 on an Ariane 5 rocket that lifted off from the Guiana Space Centre in French Guiana. The telescope was confirmed to be receiving power, starting a two-week deployment phase of its parts and traveling to its target destination. The telescope was released from the upper stage 27 minutes 7 seconds after launch, beginning a 30-day adjustment to place the telescope in a Lissajous orbit around the L_{2} Lagrange point.

The telescope was launched with slightly less speed than needed to reach its final orbit, and slowed as it travelled away from Earth, so it reached L_{2} with only the velocity needed to enter its orbit there. The telescope reached L_{2} on 24 January 2022. The flight included three planned course corrections to adjust its speed and direction. This is because the observatory could recover from underthrust (going too slowly), but could not recover from overthrust (going too fast)– to protect highly temperature-sensitive instruments, the sunshield must remain between the telescope and the Sun, so the spacecraft could not turn around or use its thrusters to slow down.

An L_{2} orbit is unstable, so JWST needs to use propellant to maintain its halo orbit around L_{2} (known as station-keeping) to prevent the telescope from drifting away from its orbital position. It was designed to carry enough propellant for 10 years, but the precision of the Ariane 5 launch and the first midcourse correction were credited with saving enough onboard fuel that JWST may be able to maintain its orbit for around 20 years instead. Space.com called the launch "flawless".

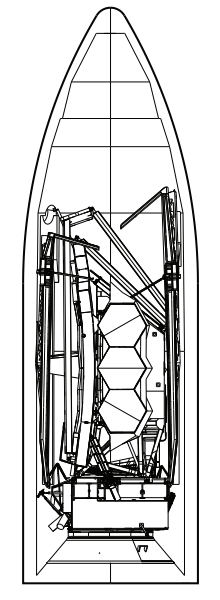
Diagram of Webb inside Ariane 5

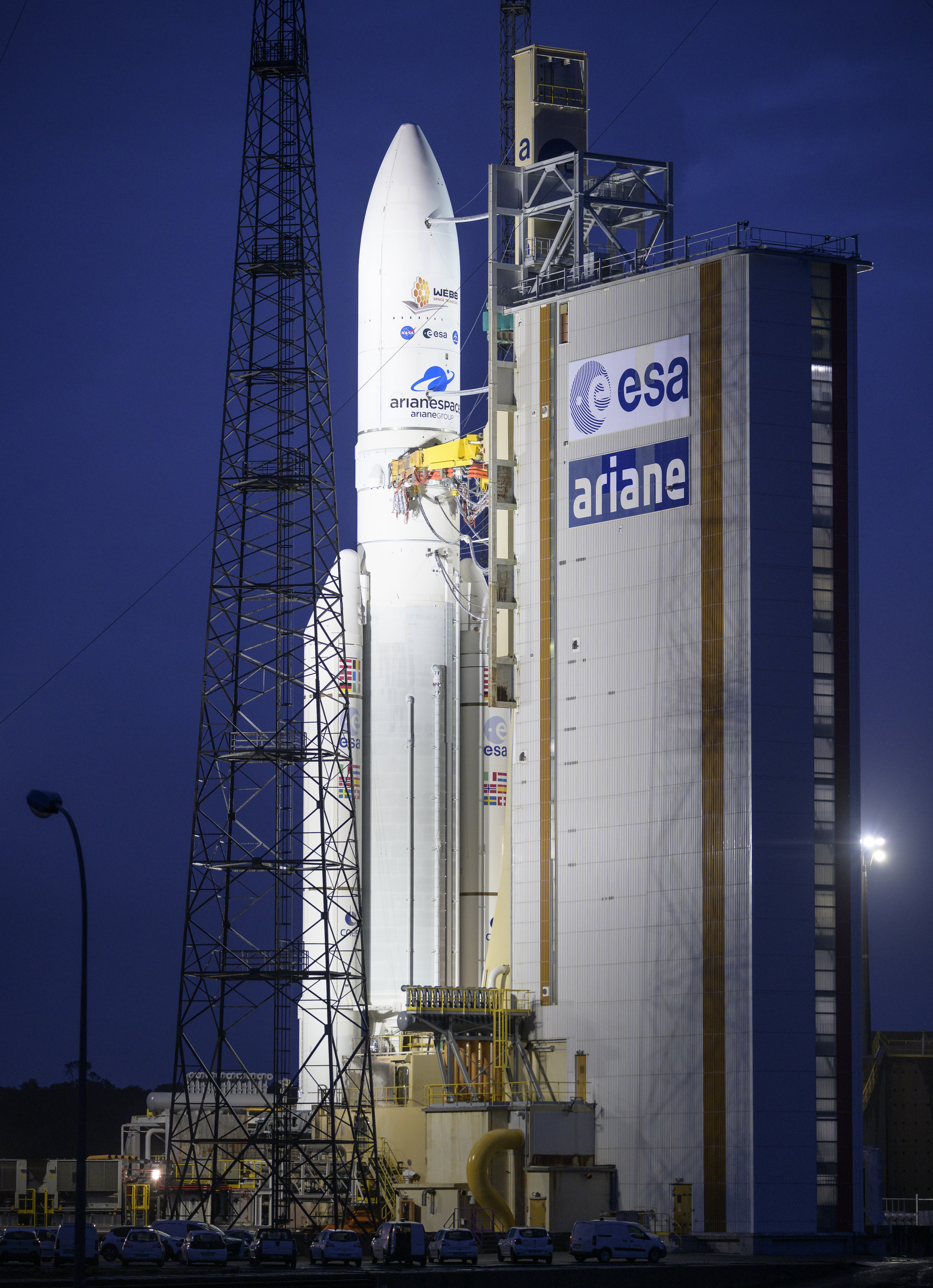
Ariane 5 and Webb at the ELA-3 launch pad

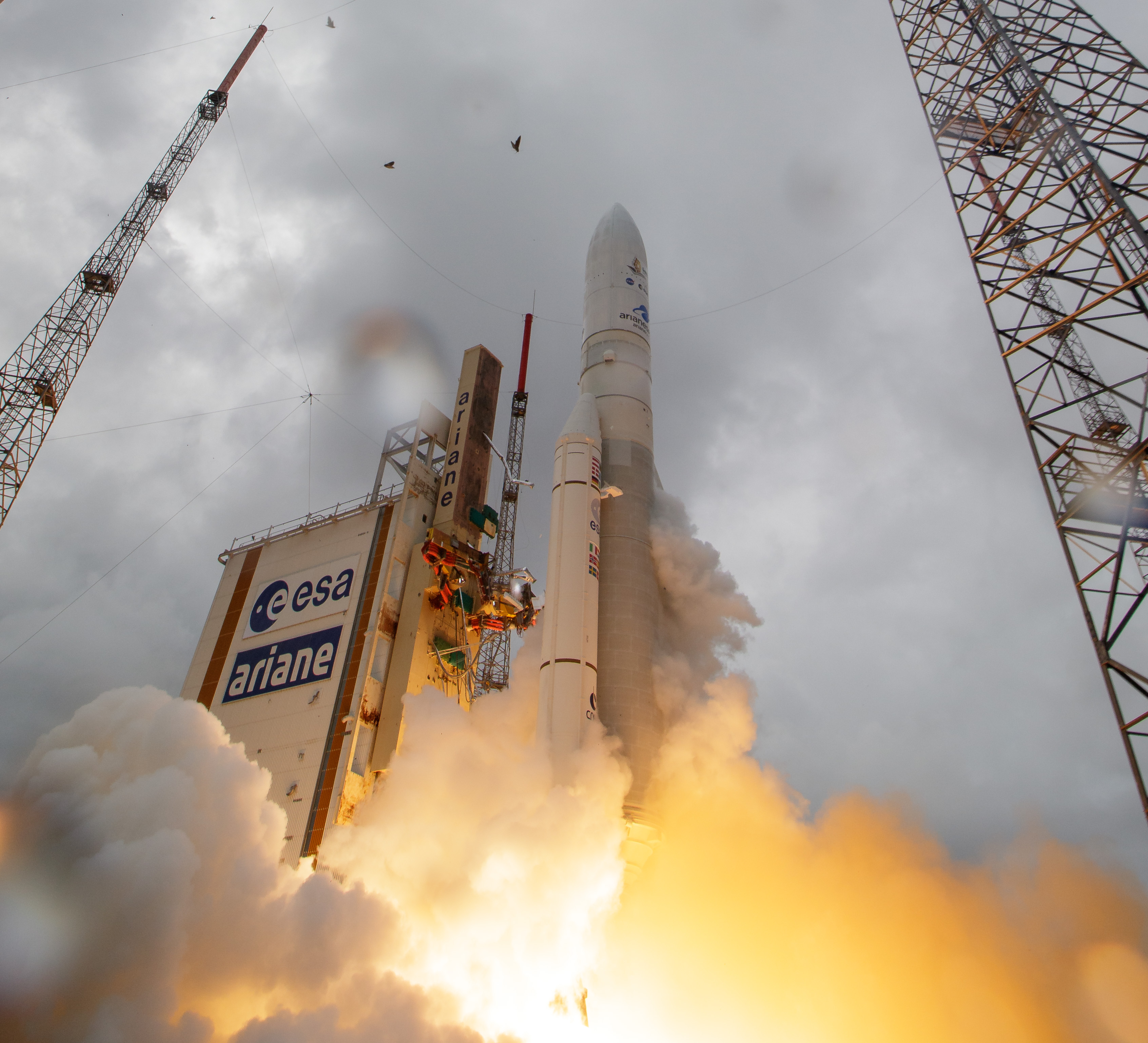
Ariane 5 containing the James Webb Space Telescope lifting off from the launch pad

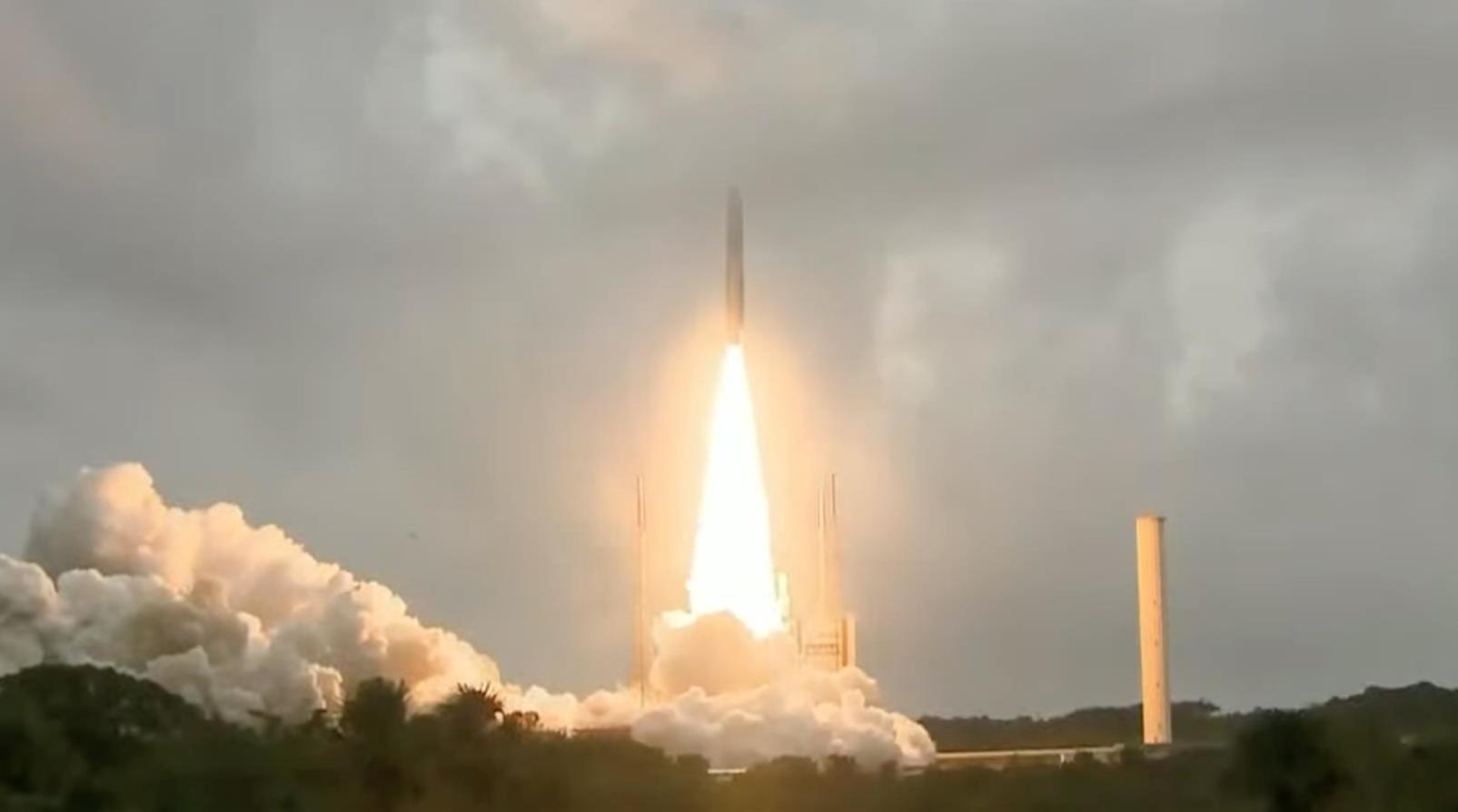
Ariane 5 containing Webb moments after lift-off

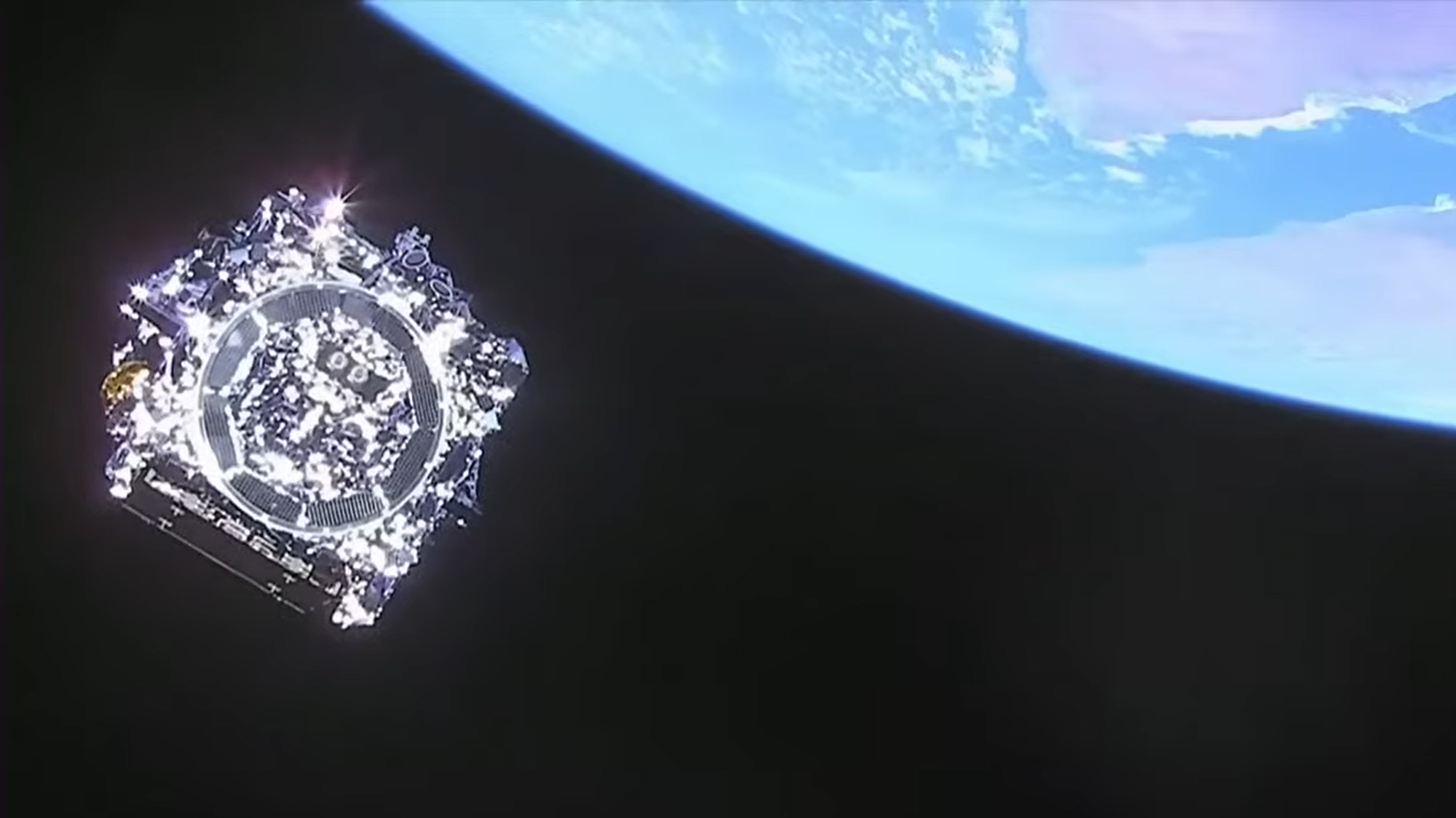
Webb as seen from the ESC-D Cryotechnic upper stage shortly after separation, approximately 29 minutes after launch. Part of the Earth with the Gulf of Aden is visible in the background of the image.

=== Transit and structural deployment ===
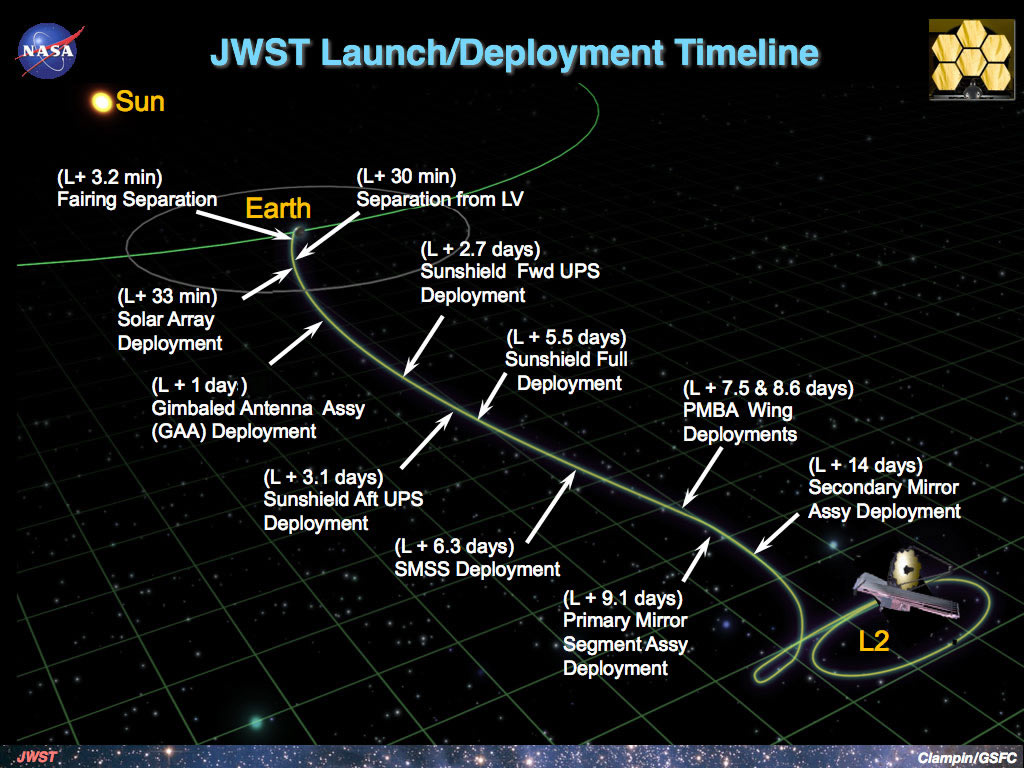
Structural deployment timeline

Webb was released from the rocket upper stage 27 minutes after a flawless launch. Starting 31 minutes after launch, and continuing for about 13 days, Webb began the process of deploying its solar array, antenna, sunshield, and mirrors. Nearly all deployment actions are commanded by the Space Telescope Science Institute in Baltimore, Maryland, except for two early automatic steps, solar panel unfolding and communication antenna deployment. The mission was designed to give ground controllers flexibility to change or modify the deployment sequence in case of problems.

Structural deployment sequence

At 7:50 p.m. EST on 25 December 2021, about 12 hours after launch, the telescope's pair of primary rockets began firing for 65 minutes to make the first of three planned mid-course corrections. On day two, the high-gain communication antenna deployed automatically.

On 27 December 2021, at 60 hours after launch, Webb's rockets fired for nine minutes and 27 seconds to make the second of three mid-course corrections for the telescope to arrive at its L_{2} destination. On 28 December 2021, three days after launch, mission controllers began the multi-day deployment of Webb's all-important sunshield. On 30 December 2021, controllers completed two more steps in the observatory's unpacking. First, commands deployed the aft "momentum flap", a device that provides balance against solar pressure on the sunshield, saving fuel by reducing the need for thruster firing to maintain Webb's orientation.

On 31 December 2021, the ground team extended the two telescoping "mid booms" from the left and right sides of the observatory. The left side deployed in 3 hours and 19 minutes; the right side took 3 hours and 42 minutes. Commands to separate and tension the membranes followed between 3 and 4 January and were successful. On 5 January 2022, mission control successfully deployed the telescope's secondary mirror, which locked itself into place to a tolerance of about one and a half millimeters.

The final step in structural deployment was to unfold the primary mirror's wings. Each panel consists of three primary mirror segments and must be folded to allow the space telescope to be installed in the fairing of the Ariane rocket for launch. On 7 January 2022, NASA deployed and locked in place the port-side wing, and on 8 January, the starboard-side mirror wing. This completed the structural deployment of the observatory.

On 24 January 2022, at 2:00 p.m. Eastern Standard Time, nearly a month after launch, a third and final course correction took place, inserting Webb into its planned halo orbit around the Sun–Earth L_{2} point.

The MIRI instrument has four observing modes– imaging, low-resolution spectroscopy, medium-resolution spectroscopy, and coronagraphic imaging. "On Aug. 24, a mechanism that supports medium-resolution spectroscopy (MRS) exhibited what appears to be increased friction during setup for a science observation. This mechanism is a grating wheel that allows scientists to select between short, medium, and longer wavelengths when making observations using the MRS mode", said NASA in a press statement.

Animation of Webb's halo orbit

=== Commissioning and testing ===
On 12 January 2022, while still in transit, mirror alignment began. The primary mirror segments and the secondary mirror were moved away from their protective launch positions. This took about 10 days, because the 132 actuator motors are designed to fine-tune the mirror positions at microscopic accuracy (10 nanometer increments) and must each move over 1.2 million increments (12.5 mm) during initial alignment.

Mirror alignment requires each of the 18 mirror segments and the secondary mirror to be positioned to within 50 nanometers. NASA compares the accuracy needed by analogy: "If the Webb primary mirror were the size of the United States, each [mirror] segment would be the size of Texas, and the team would need to line the height of those Texas-sized segments up with each other to an accuracy of about 1.5 inches".

James Webb Space Telescope Mirror alignment animations

Segment image identification. 18 mirror segments are moved to determine which segment creates which segment image. After matching the mirror segments to their respective photos, the mirrors are tilted to align all images around a common point for further analysis.

Segment alignment begins by defocusing the segment images by moving the secondary mirror slightly. Mathematical analysis, known as phase retrieval, is applied to defocused photos to determine the precise positioning errors of the segments. Adjusting the segments then yields 18 well-corrected "telescopes". However, the segments still do not work together as a single mirror.

Image stacking. To put all the light in a single place, each segment image must be stacked on top of the others. In the image-stacking step, the individual segment images are shifted so they fall precisely at the center of the field, producing a single unified image. This process prepares the telescope for coarse phasing.

Telescope alignment over instrument fields of view. After fine phasing, the telescope is well aligned at a single location in the NIRCam field of view. Next, the alignment must be extended to the remaining instruments.

Mirror alignment was a complex operation split into seven phases, repeatedly rehearsed using a 1:6-scale model of the telescope. Once the mirrors reached 120 K (−153 °C; −244 °F), NIRCam targeted the 7th-magnitude star HD 84406 in Ursa Major. (Note: HD 84406 is a star approximately 258.5 light-years away in the constellation of Ursa Major. The star is a spectral type G star and has a high proper motion.) To do this, NIRCam took 1560 images of the sky and used these wide-ranging images to determine where in the sky each segment of the main mirror initially pointed. At first, the individual primary mirror segments were greatly misaligned, so the image contained 18 separate, blurry images of the star field, each containing an image of the target star. The 18 images of HD 84406 are matched to their respective mirror segments, and the 18 segments are brought into approximate alignment centered on the star ("Segment Image Identification"). Each segment was then corrected for its major focusing errors using a technique called phase retrieval, yielding 18 high-quality images from the 18 mirror segments ("Segment Alignment"). The 18 images from each segment were then moved so they precisely overlap to create a single image ("Image Stacking").

With the mirrors positioned to produce almost correct images, they had to be fine-tuned to an operational accuracy of 50 nanometers, less than one wavelength of the light that will be detected. A technique called dispersed fringe sensing was used to compare images from 20 pairings of mirrors, allowing most of the errors to be corrected ("Coarse Phasing"), and then introduced light defocus to each segment's image, allowing detection and correction of almost all remaining errors ("Fine Phasing"). These two processes were repeated three times, and Fine Phasing will be routinely checked throughout the telescope's operation. After three rounds of Coarse and Fine Phasing, the telescope was well aligned at a single location in the NIRCam field of view. Measurements will be made at various points in the captured image across all instruments, and corrections will be calculated from the detected intensity variations, yielding a well-aligned outcome across all instruments ("Telescope Alignment Over Instrument Fields of View"). Finally, a final round of Fine Phasing and image-quality checks on all instruments was performed to ensure that any remaining small residual errors from the previous steps were corrected ("Iterate Alignment for Final Correction"). The telescope's mirror segments were then aligned, allowing it to capture precise, focused images.

In preparation for alignment, NASA announced at 19:28 UTC on 3 February 2022, that NIRCam had detected the telescope's first photons (although not yet complete images). On 11 February 2022, NASA announced the telescope had almost completed phase 1 of alignment, with every segment of its primary mirror having located and imaged the target star HD 84406, and all segments brought into approximate alignment. Phase 1 alignment was completed on 18 February 2022, and a week later, phases 2 and 3 were also completed. This meant the 18 segments were working in unison, however until all 7 phases are complete, the segments were still acting as 18 smaller telescopes rather than one larger one. At the same time as the primary mirror was being commissioned, hundreds of other instrument commissioning and calibration tasks were also ongoing.

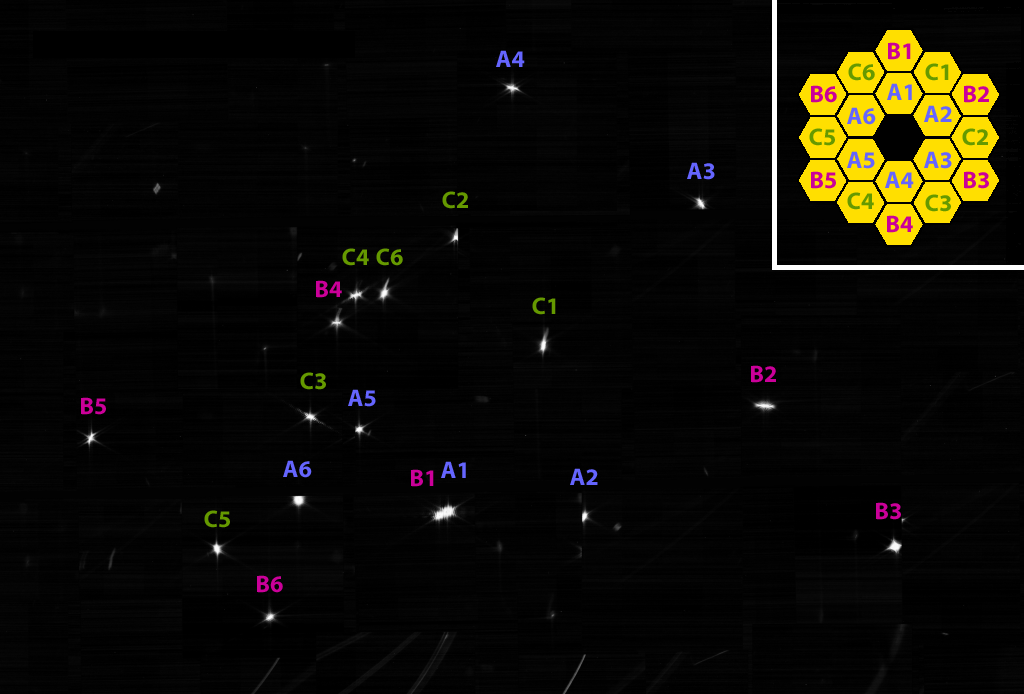
Phase 1 interim image, annotated with the related mirror segments that took each image

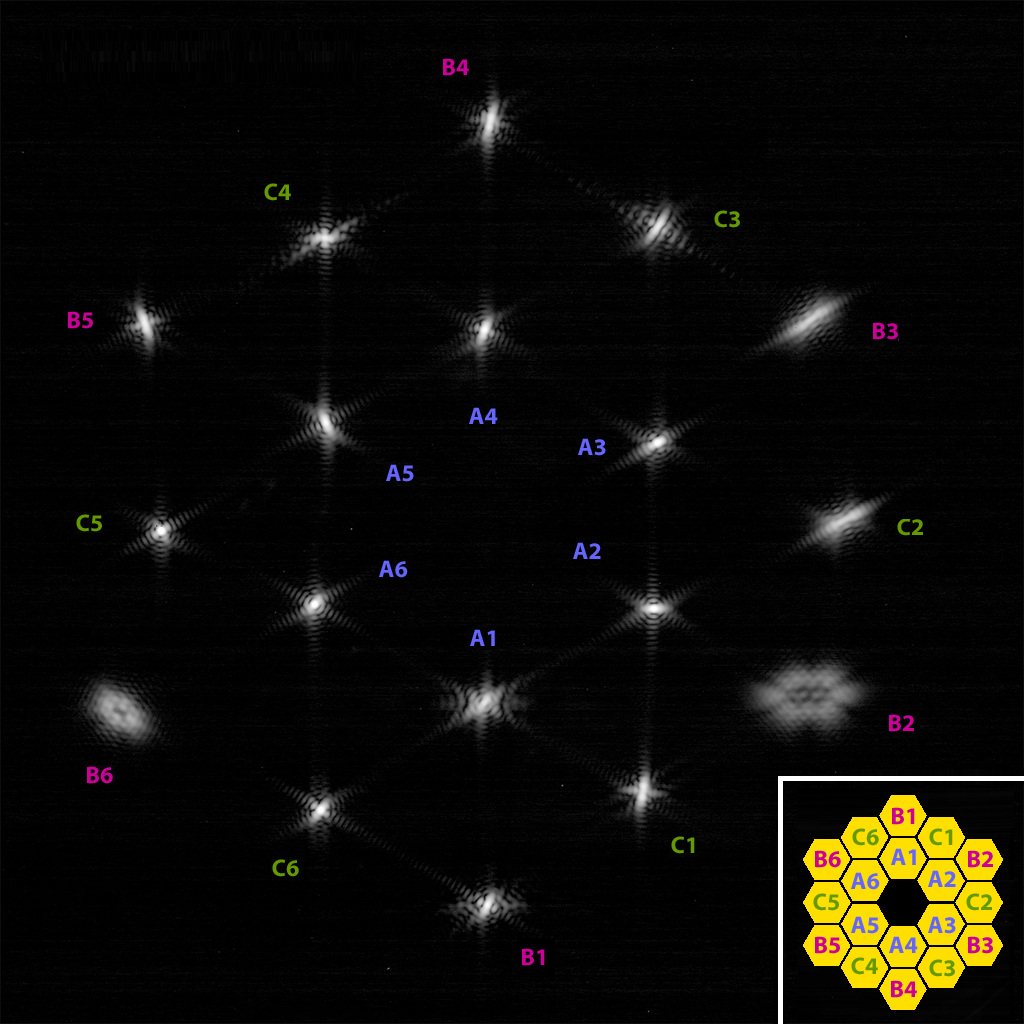
Phase 1 annotated completion image of HD 84406

Phase 2 completion, showing "before and after" effects of segment alignment

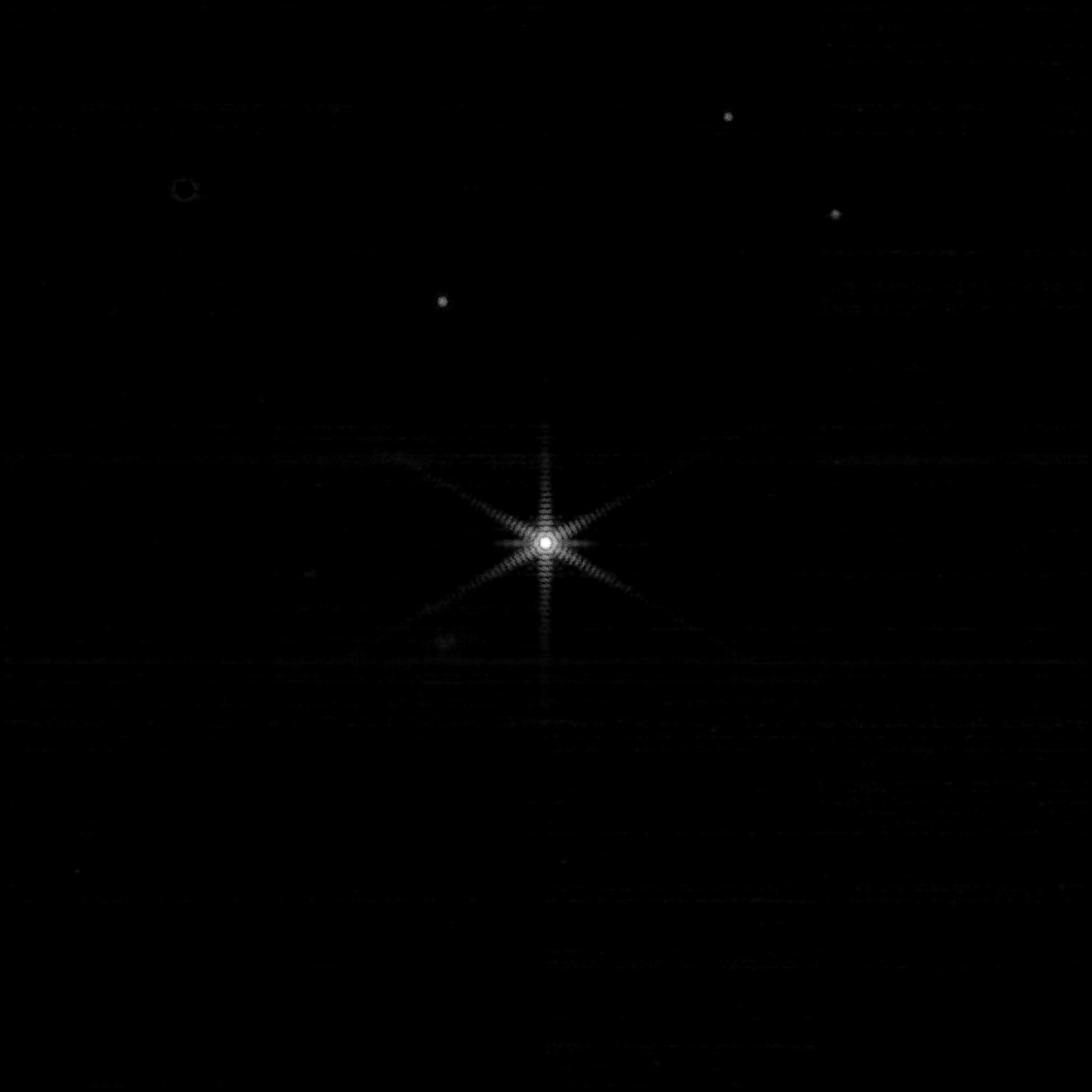
Phase 3 completion, showing 18 segments "stacked" as a single image of HD 84406

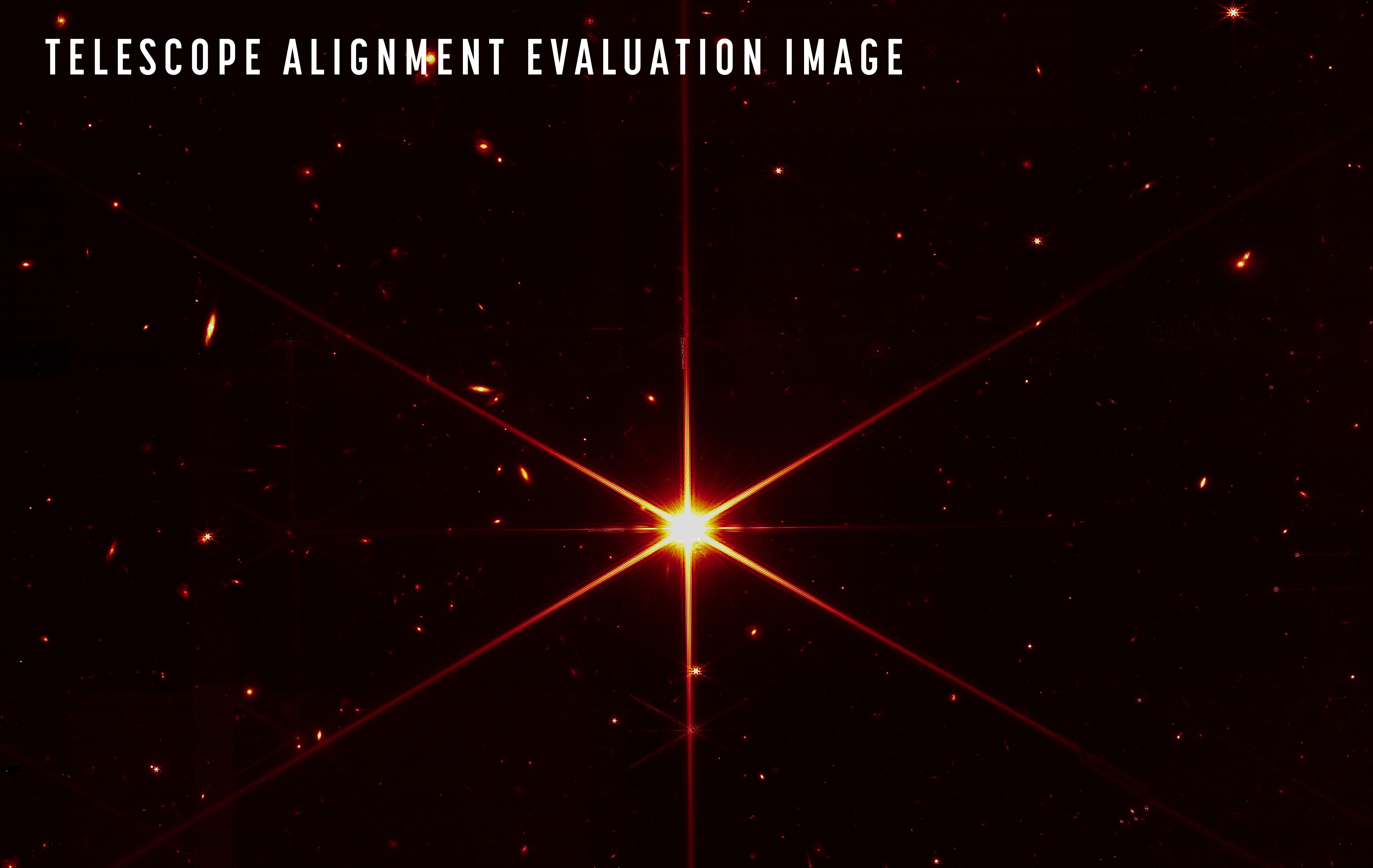
Star 2MASS J17554042+6551277 (Note: 2MASS J17554042+6551277 is a star in the constellation Draco, in the Milky Way. It is located almost 2,000 light years away from Earth, within a degree of the north ecliptic pole. Its visual apparent magnitude m_{v} is 10.95, which makes it much too faint to be observed with the naked eye. It is cooler than the Sun, but some 13 to 16 times brighter in visible light, and is consequently not a sun-like star.) captured by the NIRCam instrument

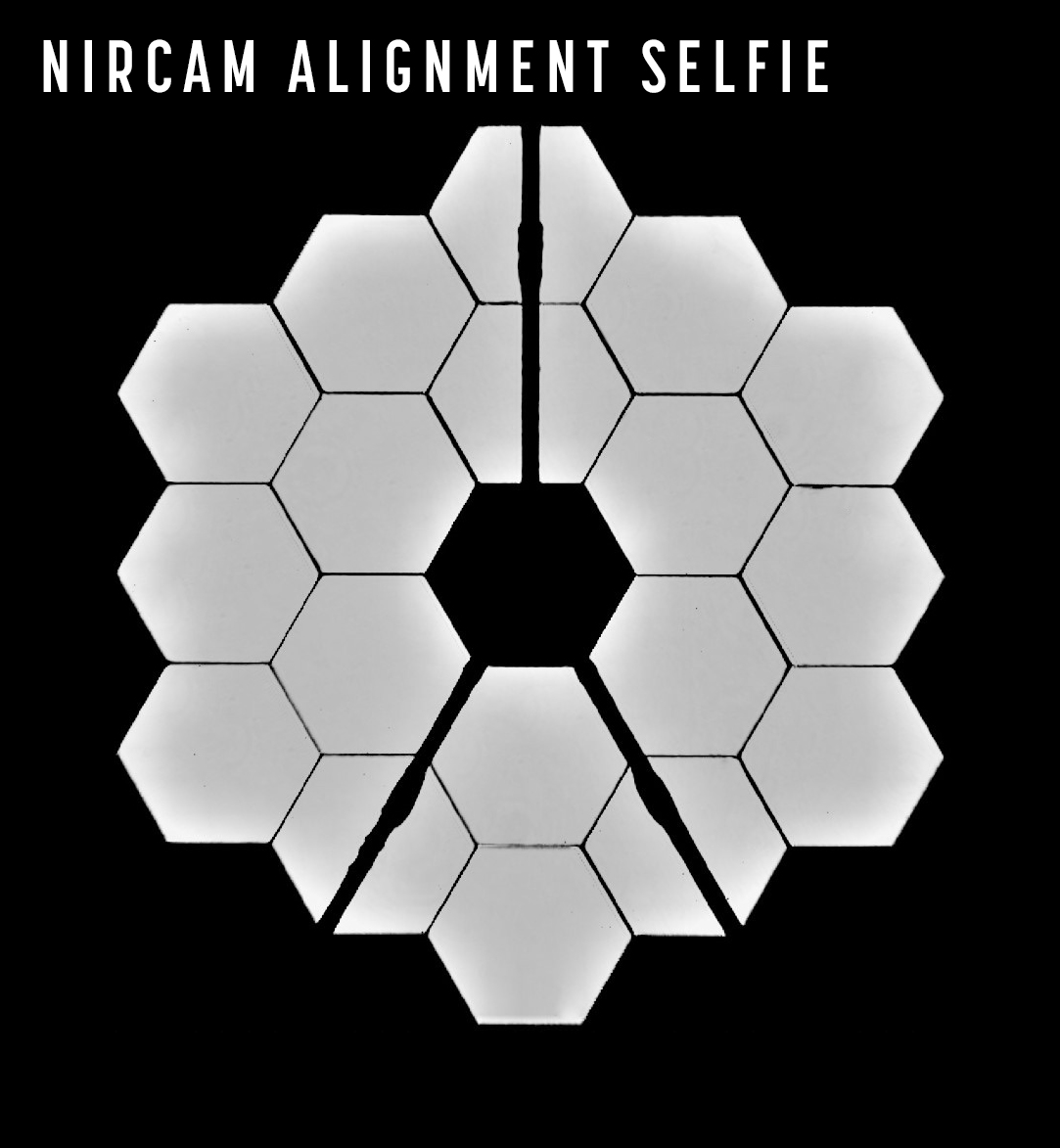
A "selfie" taken by the NIRCam during the alignment process

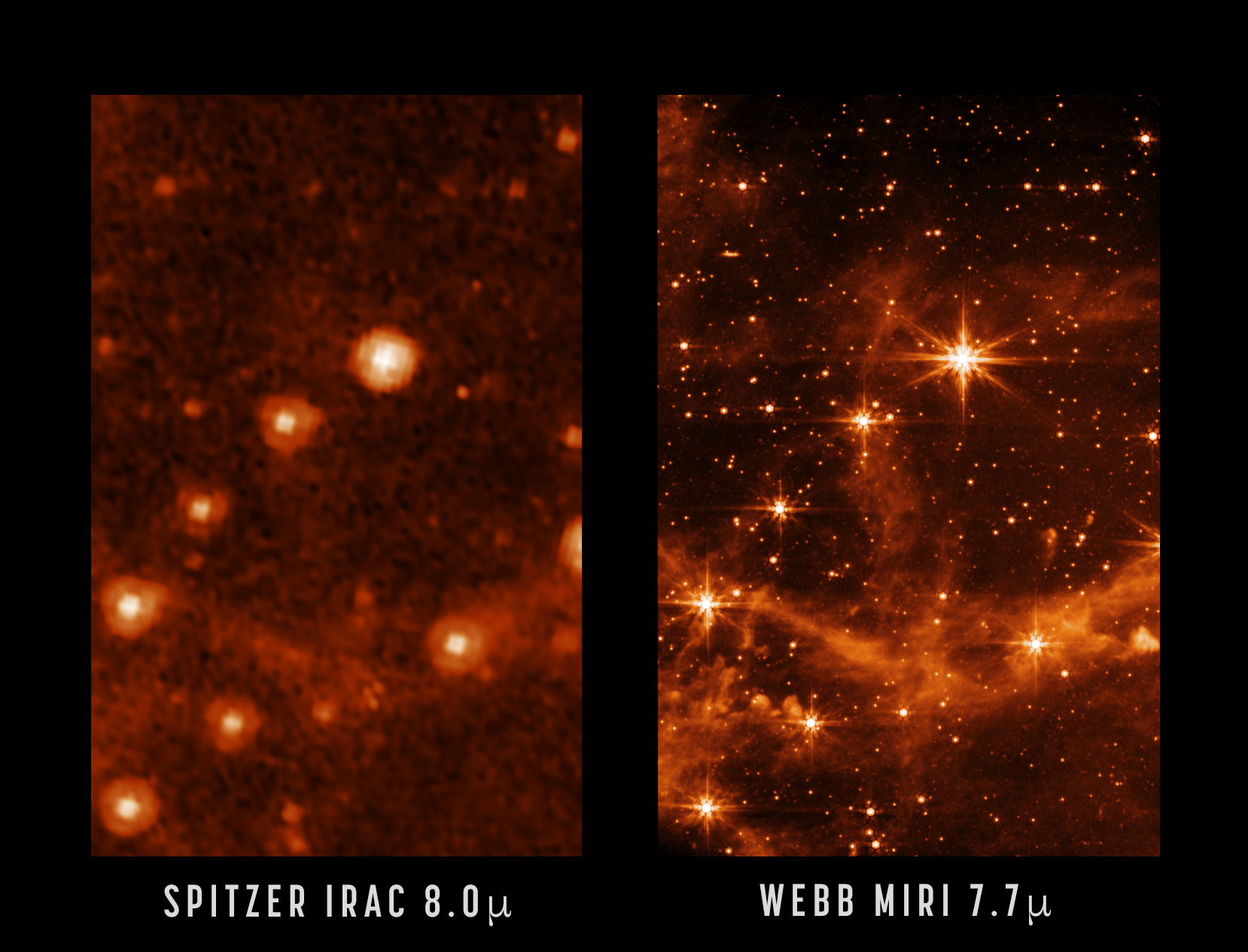
Image comparison between "old" Spitzer and new Webb

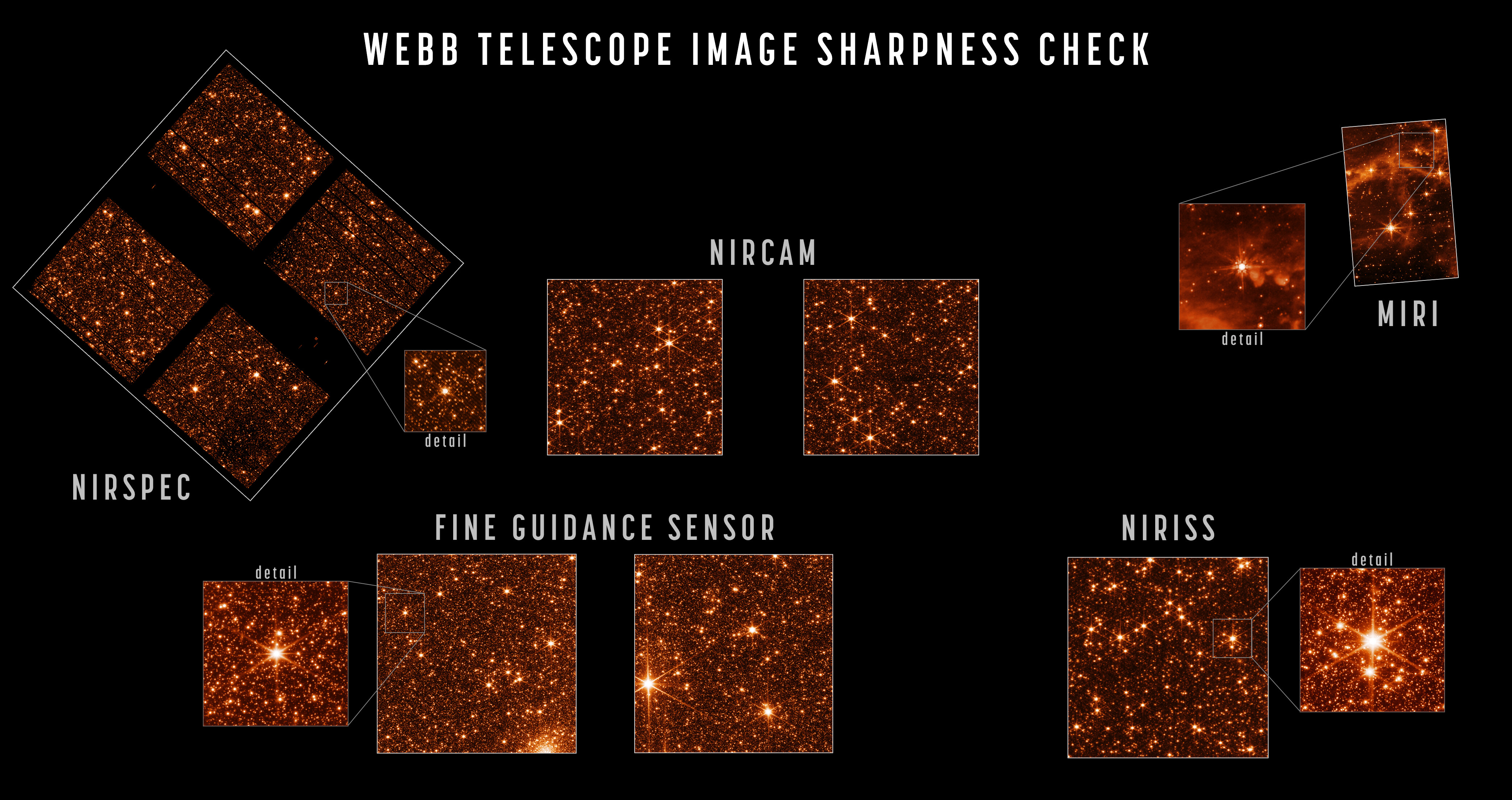
Alignment of the NASA/ESA/CSA James Webb Space Telescope's sensors

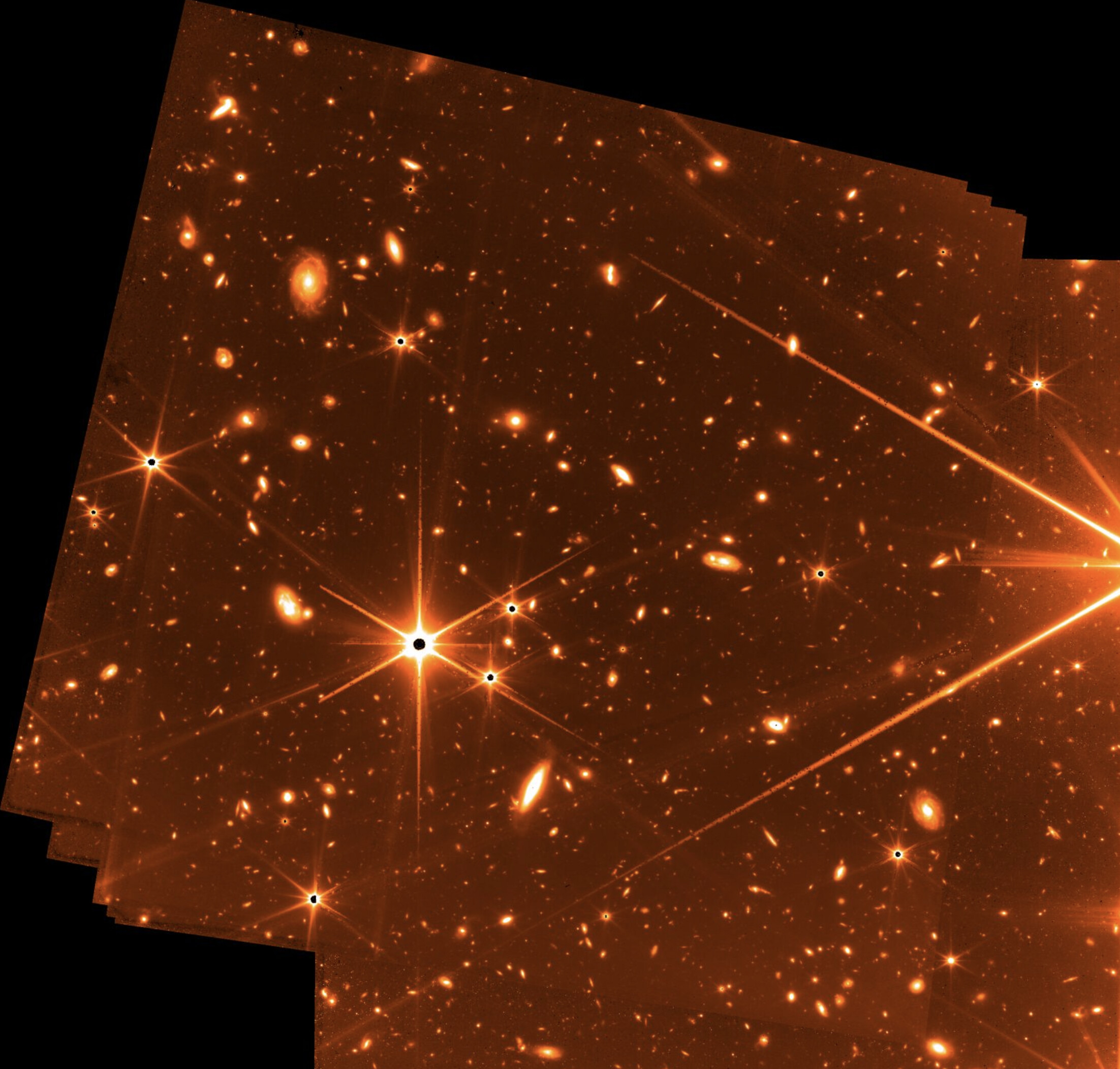
Webb's Fine Guidance Sensor (FGS)

== Allocation of observation time ==
Webb observing time is allocated through a General Observers (GO) program, a Guaranteed Time Observations (GTO) program, a Director's Discretionary Early Release Science (DD-ERS) program, a calibration program, and a Director's Discretionary Time (DDT) program. The GTO program provides guaranteed observing time for scientists who developed hardware and software components for the observatory. The GO program provides all astronomers the opportunity to apply for observing time and will represent the bulk of the observing time. GO programs are selected through peer review by a Time Allocation Committee (TAC), similar to the proposal review process used for the Hubble Space Telescope. The DDT program is used for time-critical observations.

=== Early Release Science program ===
In November 2017, the Space Telescope Science Institute announced the selection of 13 Director's Discretionary Early Release Science (DD-ERS) programs, chosen through a competitive proposal process. The observations for these programs – Early Release Observations (ERO) – were to be obtained during the first five months of Webb science operations after the end of the commissioning period. A total of 460 hours of observing time was awarded to these 13 programs, which span science topics including the Solar System, exoplanets, stars and star formation, nearby and distant galaxies, gravitational lenses, and quasars. These 13 ERS programs were to use a total of 242.8 hours of telescope observing time (excluding Webb overheads and slew time).

Early Release Science programs
Name	Principal Investigator	Category	Observation time (hours)
Radiative Feedback from Massive Stars as Traced by Multiband Imaging and Spectroscopic Mosaics	Olivier Berné	Stellar Physics	8.3
IceAge: Chemical Evolution of Ices during Star Formation	Melissa McClure	Stellar Physics	13.4
Through the Looking GLASS: A JWST Exploration of Galaxy Formation and Evolution from Cosmic Dawn to Present Day	Tommaso Treu	Galaxies and the IGM	24.3
A JWST Study of the Starburst-AGN Connection in Merging LIRGs	Lee Armus	Galaxies and the IGM	8.7
The Resolved Stellar Populations Early Release Science Program	Daniel Weisz	Stellar Populations	20.3
Q-3D: Imaging Spectroscopy of Quasar Hosts with JWST Analyzed with a Powerful New PSF Decomposition and Spectral Analysis Package	Dominika Wylezalek	Massive Black Holes and their Galaxies	17.4
The Cosmic Evolution Early Release Science (CEERS) Survey	Steven Finkelstein	Galaxies and the IGM	36.6
Establishing Extreme Dynamic Range with JWST: Decoding Smoke Signals in the Glare of a Wolf-Rayet Binary	Ryan Lau	Stellar Physics	6.5
TEMPLATES: Targeting Extremely Magnified Panchromatic Lensed Arcs and Their Extended Star Formation	Jane Rigby	Galaxies and the IGM	26.0
Nuclear Dynamics of a Nearby Seyfert with NIRSpec Integral Field Spectroscopy	Misty Bentz	Massive Black Holes and their Galaxies	1.5
The Transiting Exoplanet Community Early Release Science Program	Natalie Batalha	Planets and Planet Formation	52.1
ERS observations of the Jovian System as a Demonstration of JWST's Capabilities for Solar System Science	Imke de Pater	Solar System	9.3
High Contrast Imaging of Exoplanets and Exoplanetary Systems with JWST	Sasha Hinkley	Planets and Planet Formation	18.4

=== General Observer Program ===
For Cycle 1, 6,000 hours of observation time were available to allocate, and 1,173 proposals were submitted requesting a total of 24,500 hours. Selection of Cycle 1 GO programs was announced on 30 March 2021, with 266 programs approved. These included 13 large programs and treasury programs producing data for public access. The Cycle 2 GO program was announced on 10 May 2023. Webb science observations are nominally scheduled in weekly increments. The observation plan for every week is published on Mondays by the Space Telescope Science Institute. In Cycle 4 the telescope showed its continued popularity in the astronomy community by garnering 2,377 proposals for 78,000 hours of observing time, nine times more than the available amount.

== Scientific results ==
The JWST completed its commissioning and began full scientific operations on 11 July 2022. With some exceptions, most experiment data is kept private for one year for the exclusive use of scientists running that particular experiment, and then the raw data is released to the public.

Hubble (2017; top) compared to Webb (2022; bottom)
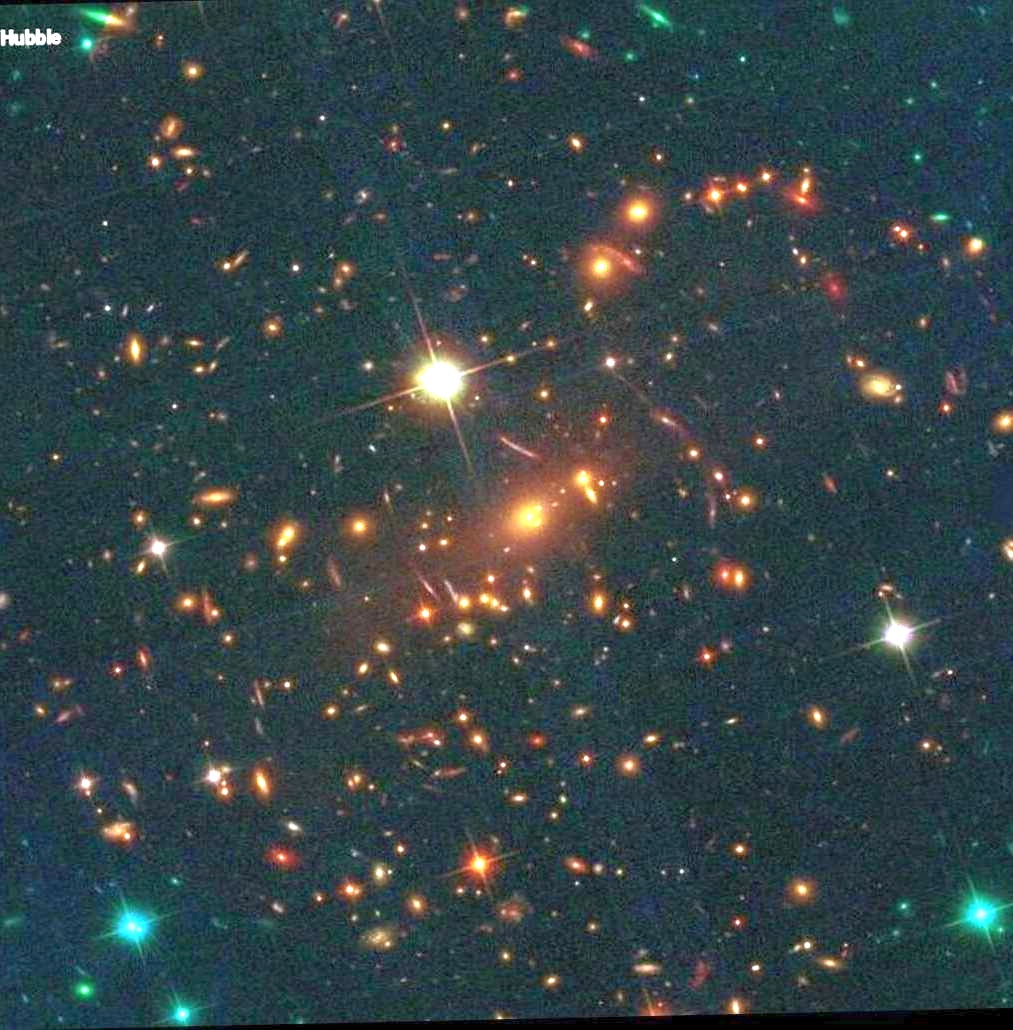
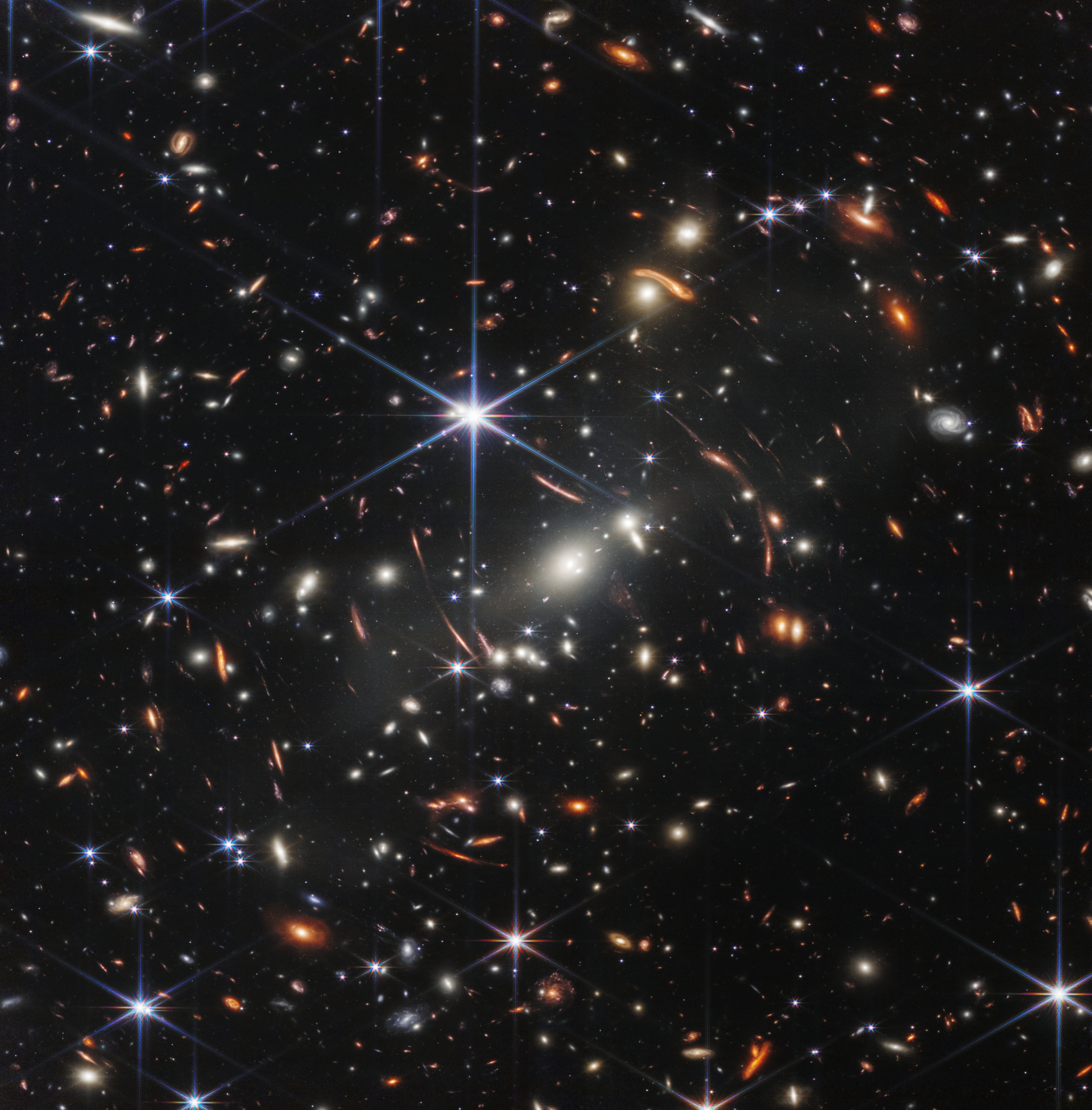
Deep Field – Galaxy cluster
SMACS J0723.3-7327

JWST observations substantially advanced understanding of exoplanets, the first billion years of the universe, and other astrophysical and cosmological phenomena.

=== First full-color images ===
The first full-color images and spectroscopic data were released on 12 July 2022, marking the official start of Webb's general science operations. U.S. President Joe Biden revealed the first image, Webb's First Deep Field, on 11 July 2022. Additional releases around this time include:

- Carina Nebula – young, star-forming region called NGC 3324 about 8,500 light-years from Earth, described by NASA as "Cosmic Cliffs".
- WASP-96b – including an analysis of atmosphere with evidence of water around a giant gas planet orbiting a distant star 1,120 light-years from Earth.
- Southern Ring Nebula – clouds of gas and dust expelled by a dying star 2,500 light-years from Earth.
- Stephan's Quintet – a visual display of five galaxies with colliding gas and dust clouds creating new stars; four central galaxies are 290 million light-years from Earth.
- SMACS J0723.3-7327 – a galaxy cluster at redshift 0.39, with distant background galaxies whose images are distorted and magnified due to gravitational lensing by the cluster. This image has been called Webb's First Deep Field. It was later discovered that in this picture were three ancient galaxies that existed shortly after the Big Bang. The images of these distant galaxies are views of the universe 13.1 billion years ago.

On 14 July 2022, NASA presented images of Jupiter and related areas by the JWST, including infrared views.

In a preprint released around the same time, NASA, ESA, and CSA scientists stated that "the science performance of JWST is better than expected". The document stated that during commissioning, the instruments captured spectra of transiting exoplanets with a precision better than 1000 ppm per data point and tracked moving objects at speeds up to 67 milliarcseconds/second, more than twice the required speed. It also obtained the spectra of hundreds of stars simultaneously in a dense field towards the Milky Way's Galactic Center. Other targets included:

- Moving targets: Jupiter's rings and moons (particularly Europa, Thebe and Metis), asteroids 2516 Roman, 118 Peitho, 6481 Tenzing, 1773 Rumpelstilz, 216 Kleopatra, 2035 Stearns, 4015 Wilson-Harrington and 2004 JX20
- NIRCam grism time-series, NIRISS SOSS and NIRSpec BOTS mode: the Jupiter-sized planet HAT-P-14b
- NIRISS aperture masking interferometry (AMI): A precise detection of the very low-mass companion star AB Doradus C, which had a separation of only 0.3 arcseconds to the primary. This observation was the first demonstration of AMI in space.
- MIRI low-resolution spectroscopy (LRS): a hot super-Earth planet L 168-9 b (TOI-134) around a bright M-dwarf star (red dwarf star)

=== Bright early galaxies ===
Within two weeks of the first Webb images, several preprint papers described a wide range of high-redshift, very luminous (presumably large) galaxies believed to date back to 235 million years (z=16.7) to 280 million years after the Big Bang, far earlier than previously known. On 17 August 2022, NASA released a large mosaic image of 690 individual frames taken by the NIRCam on Webb of numerous very early galaxies. Some early galaxies observed by Webb like CEERS-93316, which was believed to have an estimated photometric redshift of approximately z=16.7 corresponding to 235.8 million years after the Big Bang, are high redshift galaxy candidates. However, for CEERS-93316 specifically, a later spectroscopic redshift measurement revealed a more accurate redshift value of approximately z=4.91. In September 2022, primordial black holes were proposed as explaining these unexpectedly large and early galaxies. In May 2024, the JWST identified the most distant known galaxy, JADES-GS-z14-0, seen just 290 million years after the Big Bang, corresponding to a redshift of 14.32. Part of the JWST Advanced Deep Extragalactic Survey (JADES), this discovery highlights a galaxy significantly more luminous and massive than expected for such an early period. Detailed analysis using JWST's NIRSpec and MIRI instruments revealed this galaxy's remarkable properties, including its significant size and dust content, challenging current models of early galaxy formation.

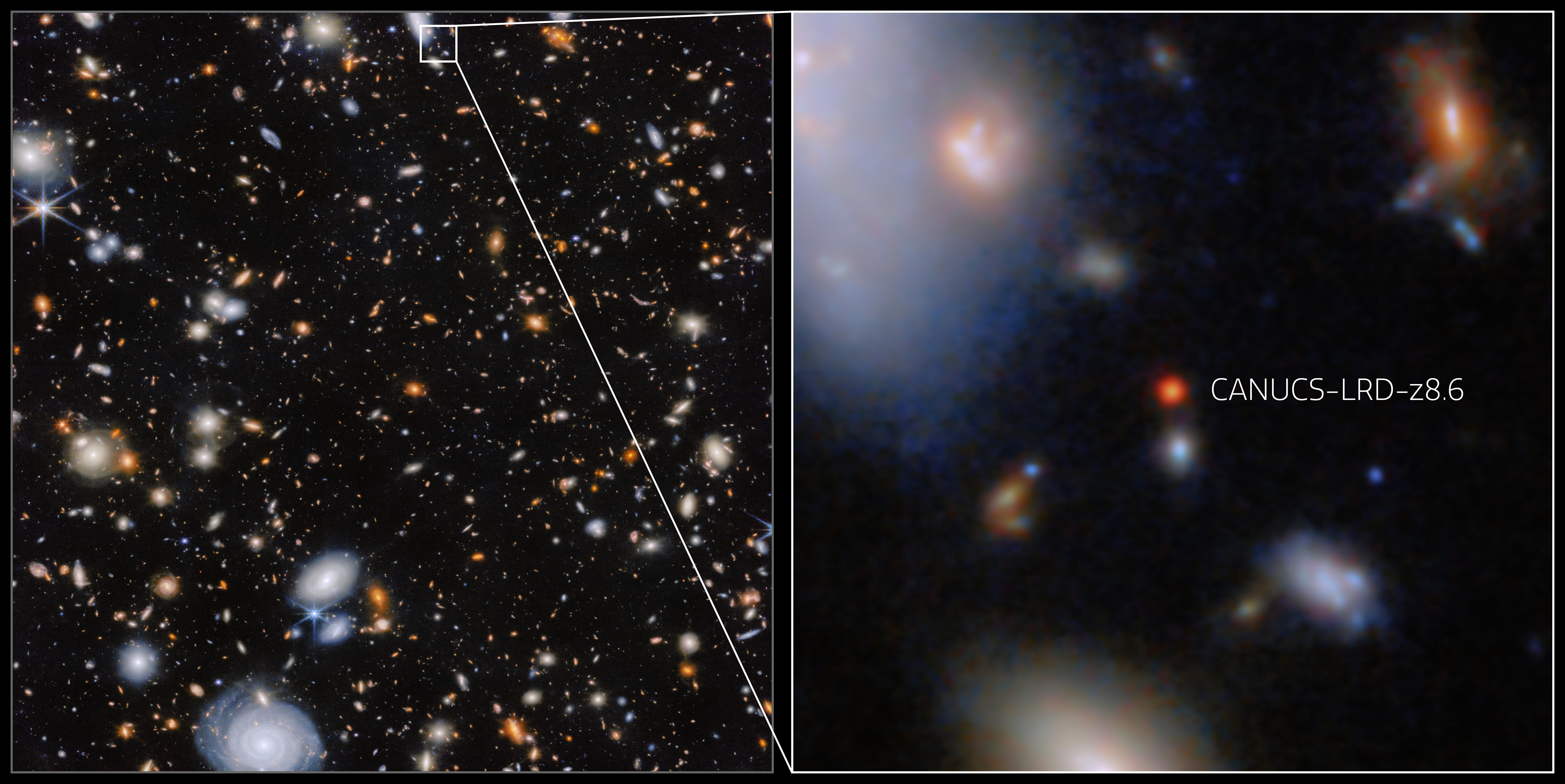
November 2025 JWST observations confirmed an actively growing supermassive black hole within a "little red dot" galaxy named CANUCS-LRD-z8.6.

In late 2025, JWST observations of high-redshift "little red dots" (LRDs) and early galaxies provided constraints favoring the existence of massive black hole seeds over standard stellar-remnant models. In August 2025, Juodžbalis et al. reported a direct dynamical mass measurement of a black hole in a strongly lensed LRD galaxy UHZ1 at redshift z=7.04, finding a central mass of about 50 million solar masses, outweighing its galaxy's stars. The authors describe it as consistent with formation in the early universe. Subsequently, Tripodi et al. identified an active galactic nucleus in the LRD "CANUCS-LRD-z8.6" at about z=8.6, containing a roughly 10^{8} solar mass black hole that had grown rapidly before its host galaxy established significant stellar mass, consistent with extremely early formation or direct collapse. Concurrently, Chavez Ortiz et al. presented evidence for an active ~10^{7.2} solar mass black hole in the galaxy GHZ2 at z=12.34, less than 400 million years after the Big Bang — the most distant black hole identified to date — further challenging standard accretion limits and supporting rapid formation mechanisms.

=== Exoplanet atmospheres and galactic evolution ===
In May 2026, a study in the journal Science reported the first detection of a repeating daily cloud cycle on a hot Jupiter exoplanet, WASP-94A b. The observations revealed magnesium silicate clouds forming on the planet's morning side and evaporating on the evening side, which allowed for a more accurate characterization of its composition as being five times more carbon-rich than Jupiter. Simultaneously, further phase curve analysis definitively ruled out thick atmospheres for the inner planets TRAPPIST-1b and TRAPPIST-1c, while a study in Nature Astronomy used Webb imagery to demonstrate that the most massive star clusters clear their surrounding natal gas clouds significantly faster than smaller clusters.

== Gallery ==
First images by the James Webb Space Telescope – released 12 July 2022

Cosmic Cliffs of Carina Nebula (NGC 3324) (NIRCam)

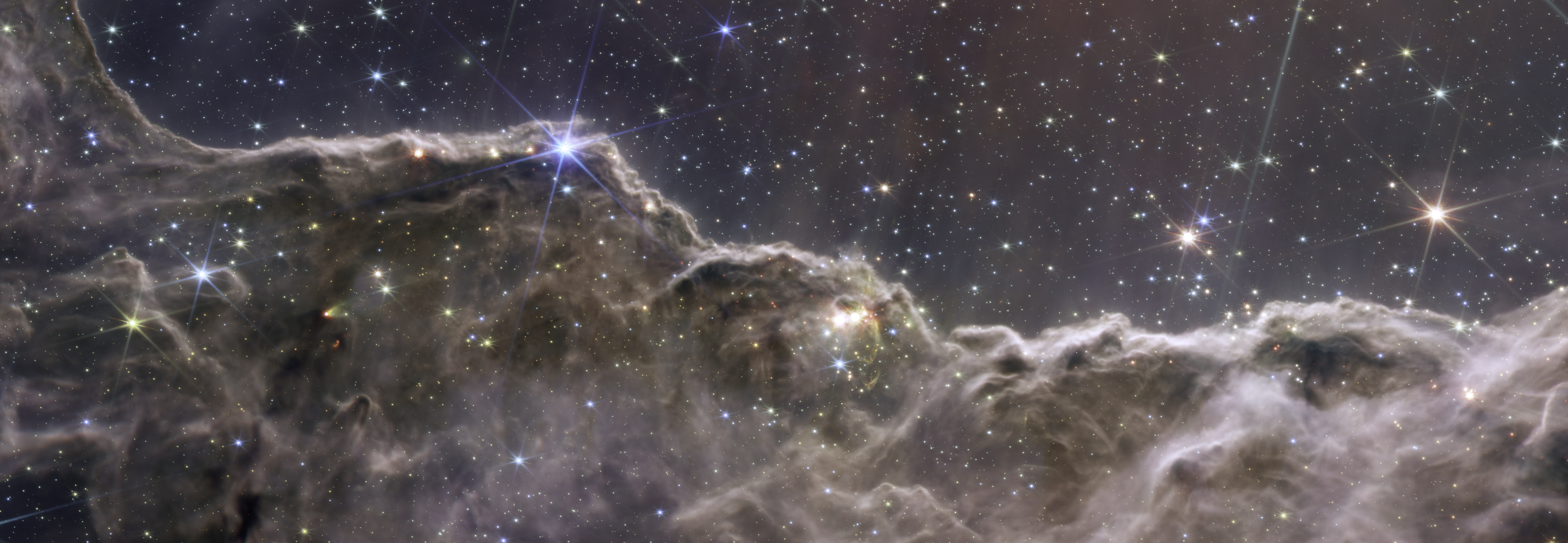
Carina Nebula (NGC 3324) (MIRI)

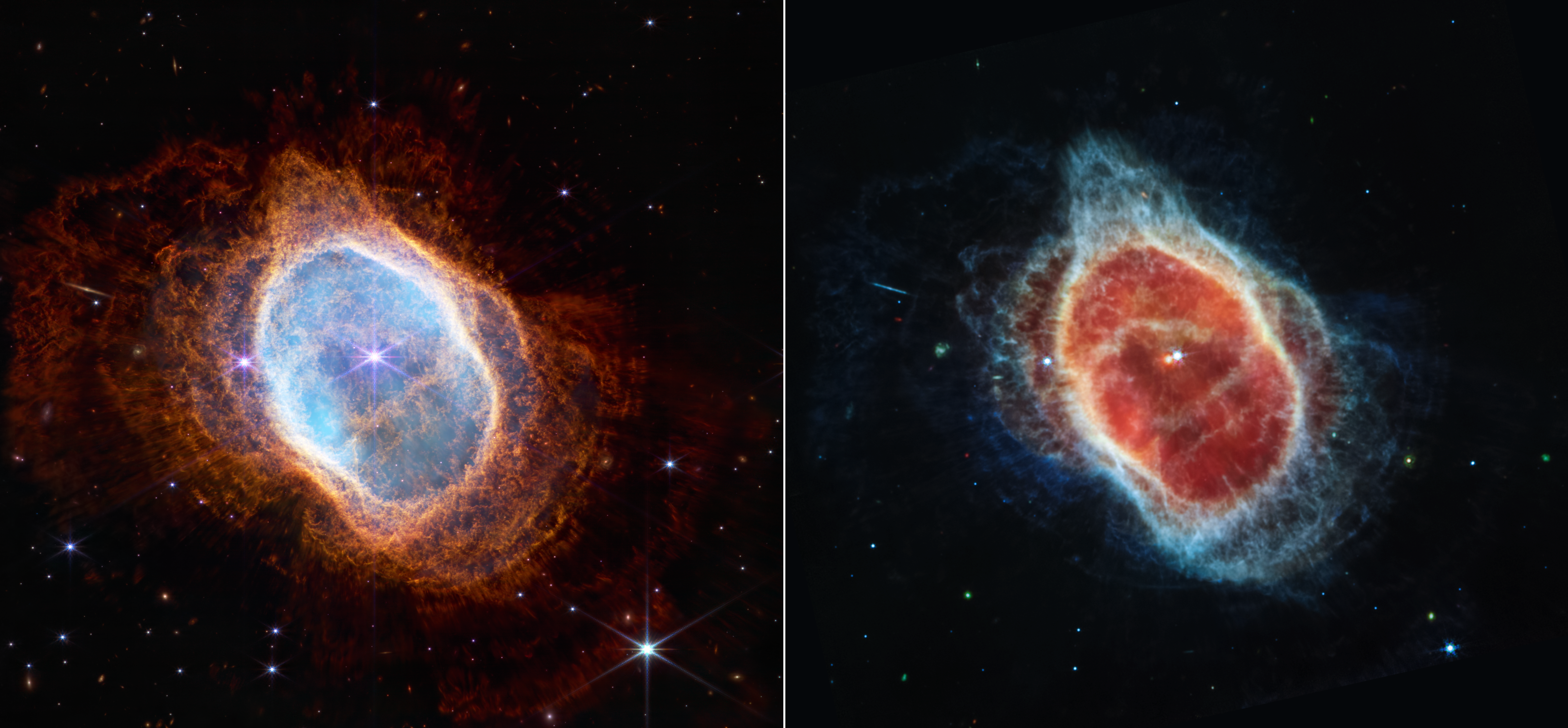
Southern Ring Nebula (NGC 3132; Left: NIRCam; Right: MIRI)

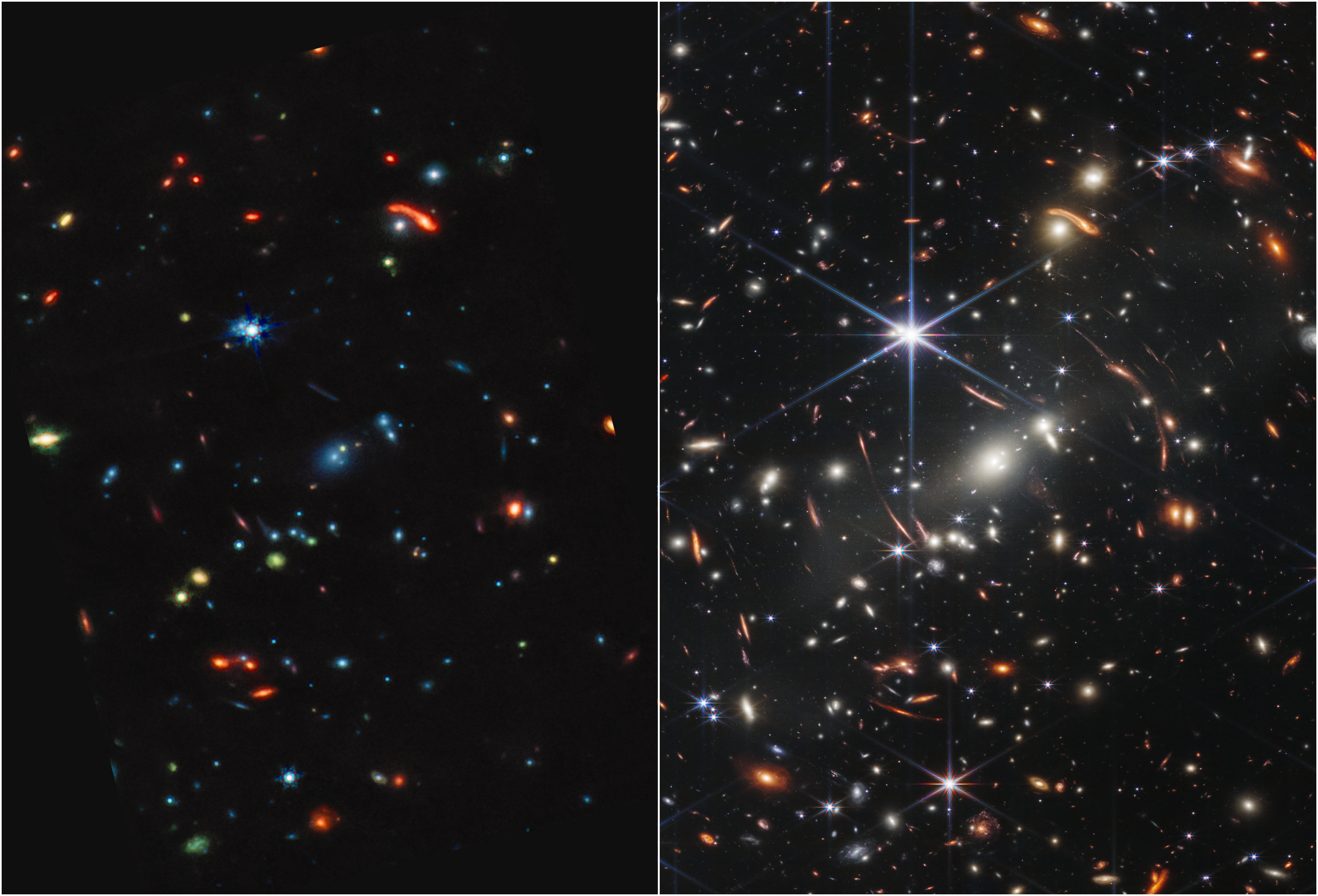
Webb's First Deep Field (SMACS 0723; Left: MIRI; Right: NIRCam)

Stephan's Quintet (NIRCam/MIRI composite)

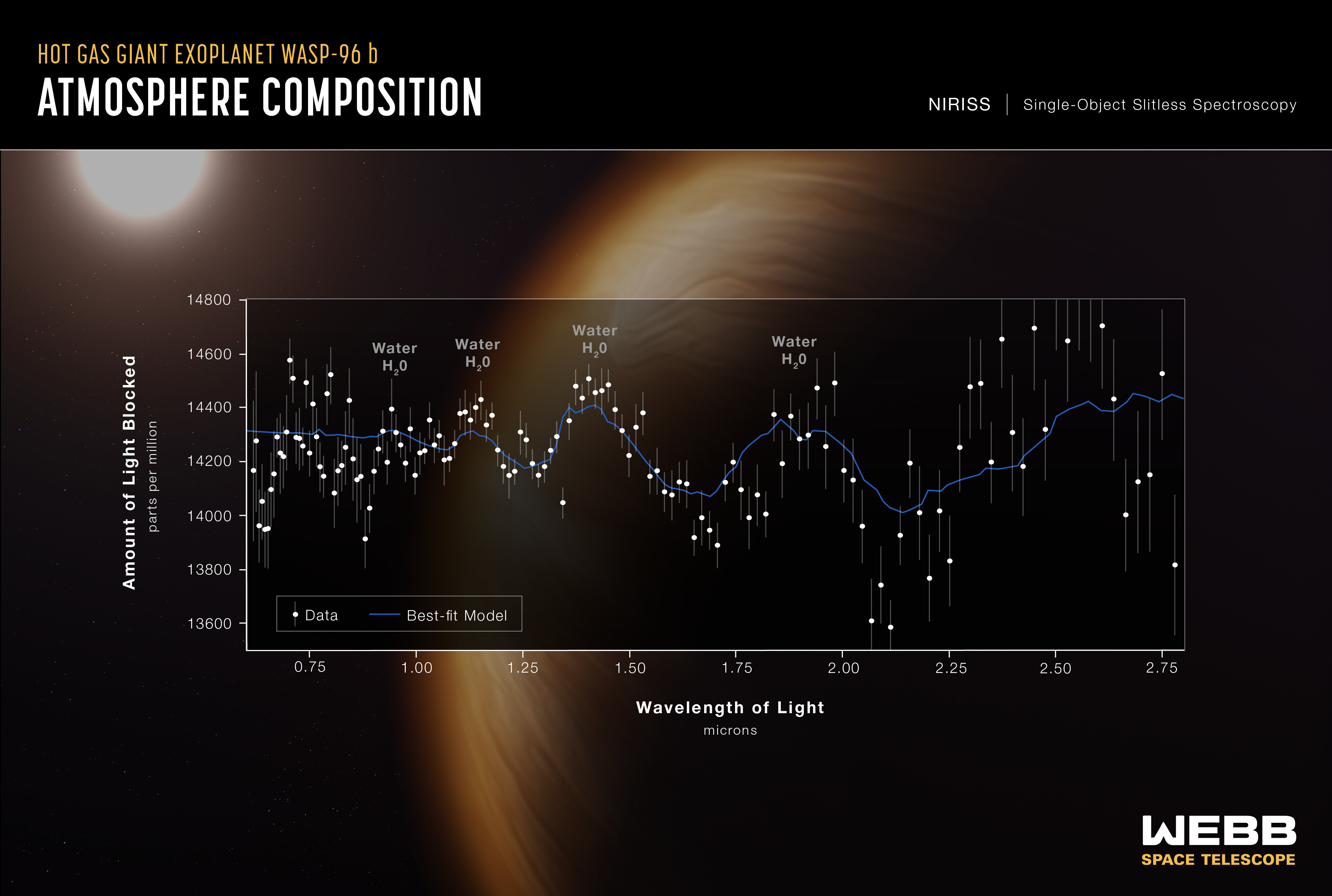
Spectrum of WASP-96b
Media related to Images by the James Webb Space Telescope at Wikimedia Commons

== See also ==
- Collier Trophy – to JWST in 2023
- Libration point orbit – Quasiperiodic orbit around a Lagrange point
- List of deep fields
- List of largest infrared telescopes
- List of largest optical reflecting telescopes
- List of space telescopes
- Lunar Crater Radio Telescope - proposed telescope on the far side of the Moon in a crater
- Nancy Grace Roman Space Telescope – launched in 2026
- New Worlds Mission – proposed occulter for the JWST
- Pea galaxy § 2023
- Physical cosmology – Branch of physics that studies mathematical models of the universe
- Satellite bus – Main body and structural component of the satellite
- Solar panels on spacecraft
- Spacecraft design
- Spacecraft attitude control – Process of controlling orientation of an aerospace vehicle
- Spacecraft thermal control – Process of keeping all parts of a spacecraft within acceptable temperature ranges
- Timeline of the James Webb Space Telescope
- Unknown: Cosmic Time Machine, Netflix documentary about the James Webb Space Telescope
