= Test article (aerospace) =

Vehicle or equipment used to test portions of a spaceflight regime

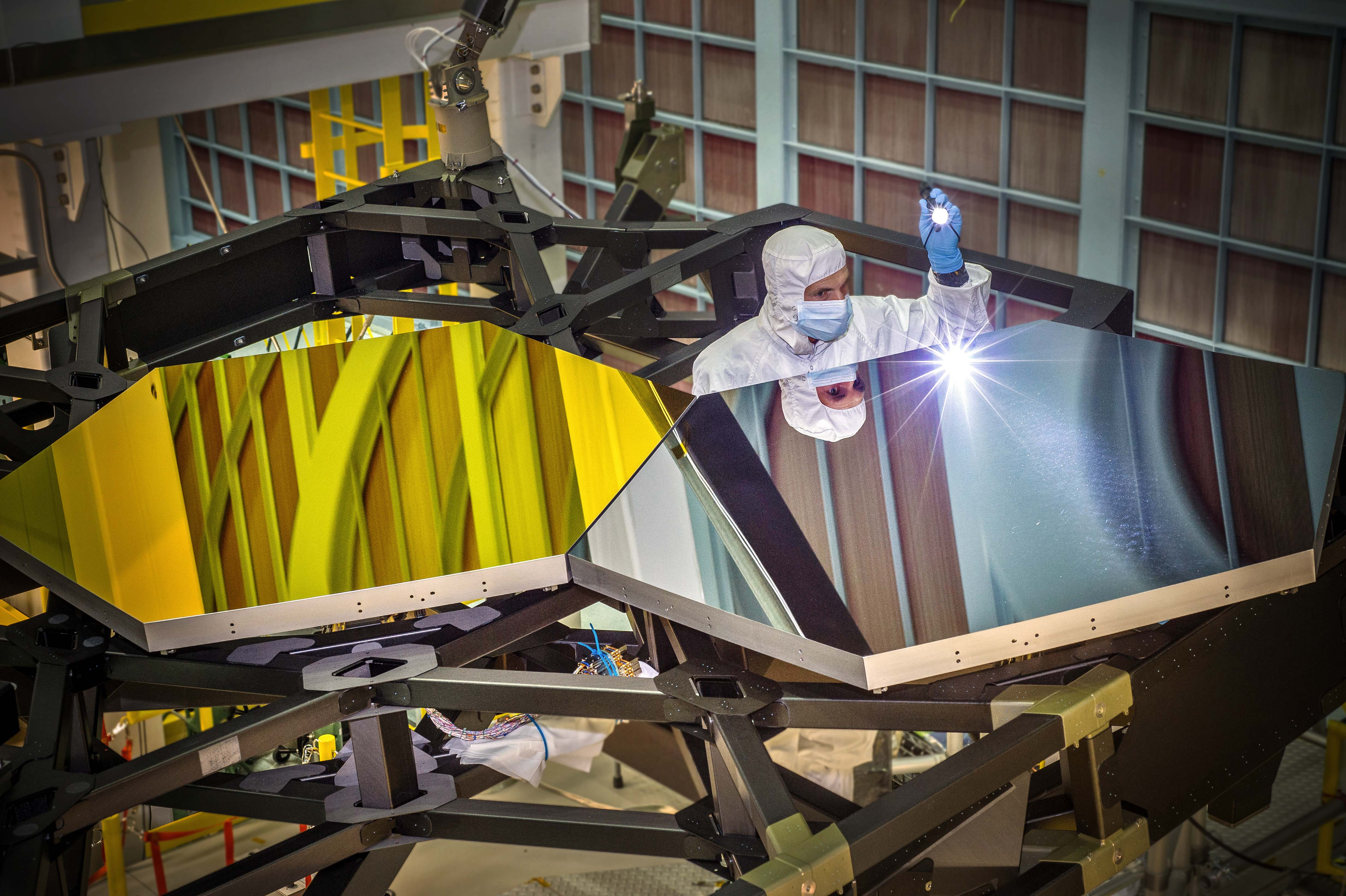
The Pathfinder for the James Webb Space Telescope shown here with extra mirrors on a non-flight test unit of the backplane

A test article or pathfinder is a version of a spacecraft or related vehicle or equipment, built as a platform to perform testing on particular portions of a spaceflight regime. Test articles are built to the specifications necessary to replicate particular conditions and behaviors that are to be validated. Test articles may be built for flight testing or for non-flight testing.

For space agencies with extensive flight certification procedures, they may be built without the certification and quality control steps taken with the versions intended for flight. Test articles are more complete than a boilerplate.

== Overview ==
Some test articles are theoretically able to be modified and upgraded to flight-ready status. Of the 136 Space Shuttle external tanks produced, one was retained as a test article. The contractor producing the tanks stated that that tank could be refurbished for flight use if necessary.

Test articles are often displayed in museums because of their accuracy. Museums may refurbish test articles to match more modern configurations. This was completed on the Hubble Space Telescope Structural Dynamic Test Vehicle on display at the National Air and Space Museum where this 1976 version of the vehicle was removed from display and upgraded in 1996 by the Smithsonian, Lockheed, and NASA to incorporate changes made on the on-mission version of the Hubble Space Telescope over several servicing missions.

== See also ==
- OTE Pathfinder (Test article/ETU for JWST)
- Space Shuttle Pathfinder
- Prototype
