= Optical Telescope Element =

Subsection of the James Webb Space Telescope

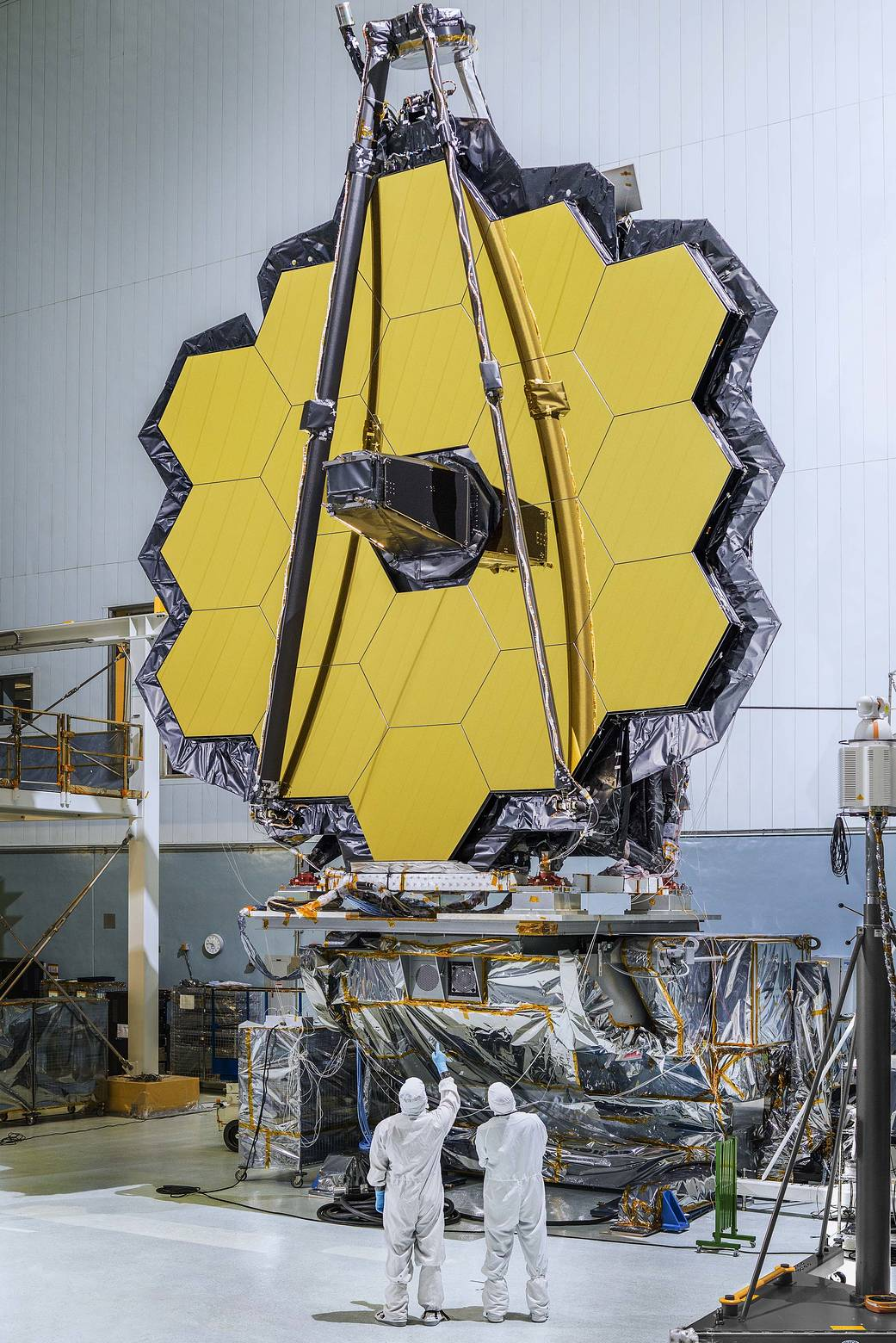
The mirror assembly from the front with primary mirrors attached, November 2016

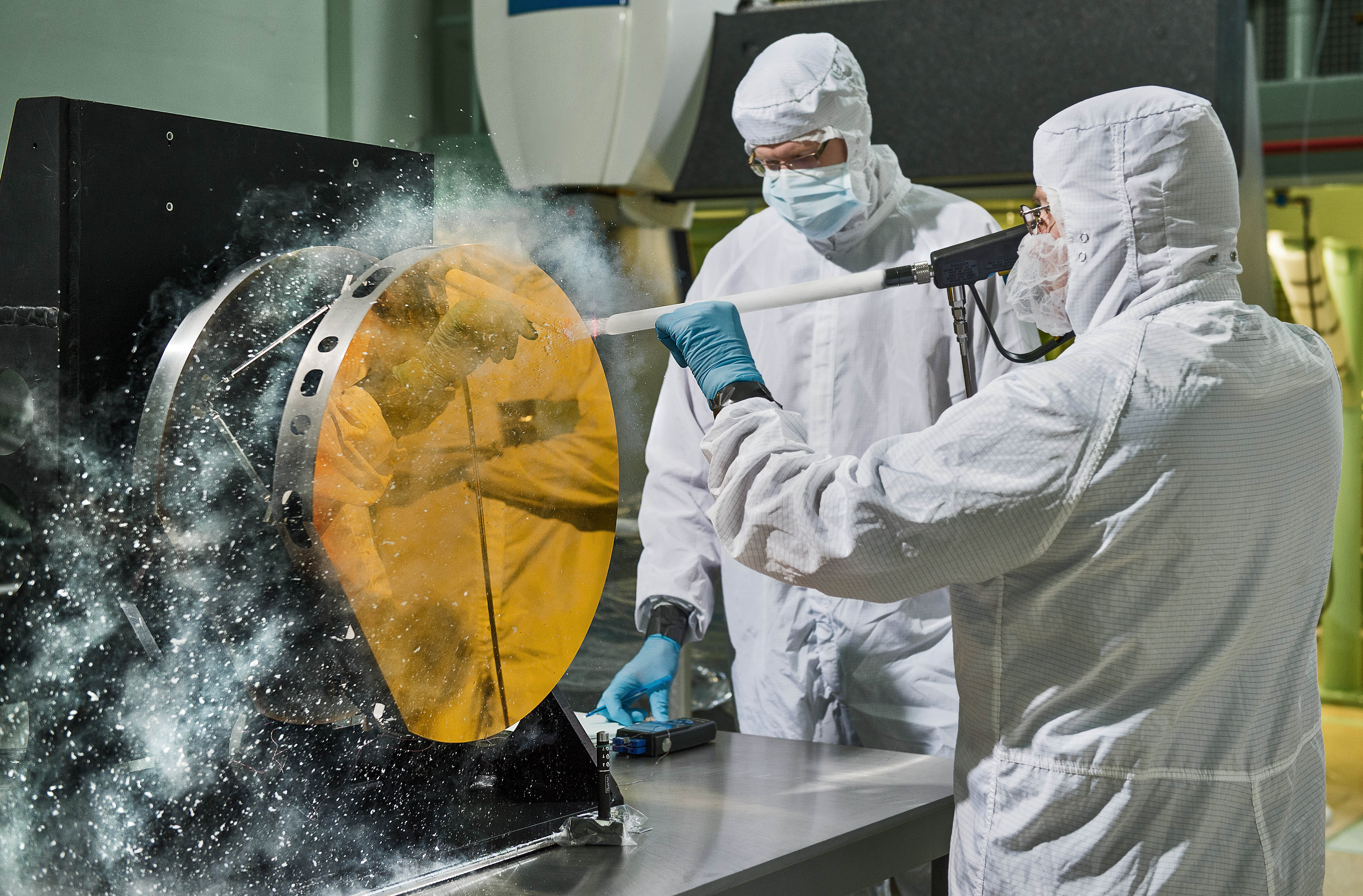
A test mirror being cleaned with carbon dioxide snow

Optical Telescope Element (OTE) is one of three major sections of the James Webb Space Telescope, a large infrared space telescope launched on 25 December 2021, consisting of its main mirror, secondary mirrors, the framework and controls to support the mirrors, and various thermal and other systems.

The OTE collects the infrared light and directs it to the science instruments in Webb's second major section, the Integrated Science Instrument Module (ISIM). The OTE has been compared to being the "eye" of the telescope and the backplane of it to being the "spine". The third major section of the JWST is the Spacecraft Element (SE), which includes the spacecraft bus and sunshield.

The OTE has a three-mirror anastigmat (TMA) design, with an effective f/20 focal ratio and focal length of 131.4 meters (431 ft). The primary mirror is a tiled assembly of 18 hexagonal elements, each 1.32 meters (4.3 ft) from flat to flat. When properly aligned, this combination yields an effective aperture of 6.5 meters (21 ft) and a total collecting surface of 25.4 square meters (273 ft^{2}). The secondary mirror is a convex circular mirror with a diameter of 0.74 meters (2.4 ft), and it feeds into the Aft Optics Subsystem (part of OTE), which contains the tertiary mirror (fixed) and the Fine Steering Mirror (FSM, movable). All mirrors are made of gold-plated beryllium, due to its low weight, structural stability at low temperatures and high infrared reflectivity.

The principal subcontractor for the JWST optics was Ball Aerospace, and the mirror development team included Brush Wellman (forming), Axsys Technologies (shaping) and L-3 Communications SSG-Tinsley (polishing). The components of OTE were integrated by L3Harris Technologies to form the final system.

== Overview ==
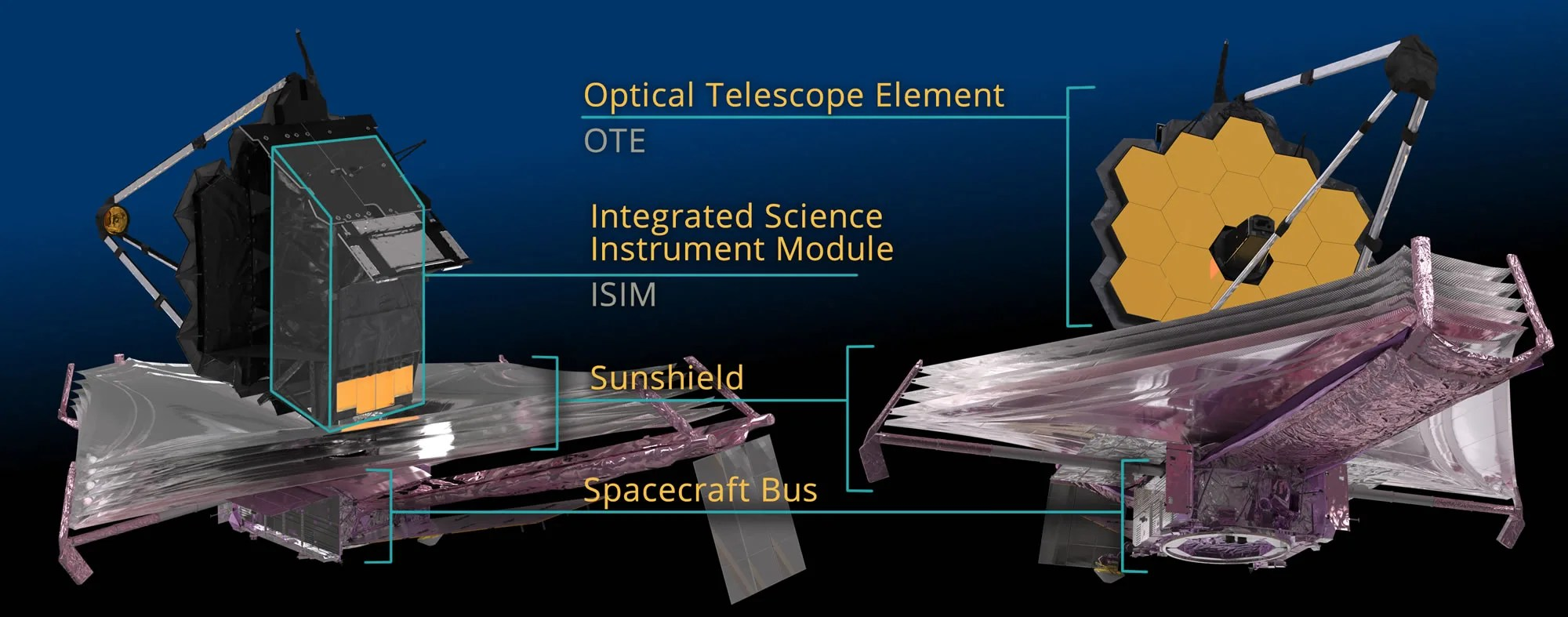
JWST major components: spacecraft bus, sunshield, Optical Telescope Element (OTE) and the Integrated Science Instrument Module (ISIM)

The OTE combines a large amount of the optics and structural components of the James Webb Space Telescope, including the Main mirror. It also has the fine steering mirror, which provides that final precise pointing, and it works in conjunction with the fine guidance sensor and other controls systems and sensors in the spacecraft bus.

The main mirror segments are aligned roughly using a coarse phasing algorithm. Then for finer alignment, special optical devices inside NIRCam are used to conduct a phase retrieval technique, to achieve designed wavefront error of less than 150 nm. To function as focusing mirror correctly the 18 main mirror segments need to be aligned very closely to perform as one. This needs to be done in outer space, so extensive testing on Earth is required to ensure that it will work properly. To align each mirror segment, it is mounted to six actuators that can adjust that segment in 5 nm steps. One reason the mirror was divided into segments is that it cuts down on weight, because a mirror's weight is related to its size, which is also one of the reasons beryllium was chosen as the mirror material because of its low weight. Although in the essentially weightless environment of space the mirror will weigh hardly anything, it needs to be very stiff to maintain its shape. The Wavefront sensing and control sub-system is designed to make the 18 segment primary mirror behave as a monolithic (single-piece) mirror, and it does this in part by actively sensing and correcting for errors. There are nine distance alignment processes that the telescope goes through to achieve this. Another important aspect to the adjustments is that the primary mirror backplane assembly is steady. The backplane assembly is made of graphite composite, invar, and titanium.

The ADIR, Aft Deployable Infrared Radiator is a radiator behind the main mirror, that helps keep the telescope cool. There are two ADIR's and they are made of high-purity aluminum. There is a special black coating on the radiators that helps them emit heat into space.

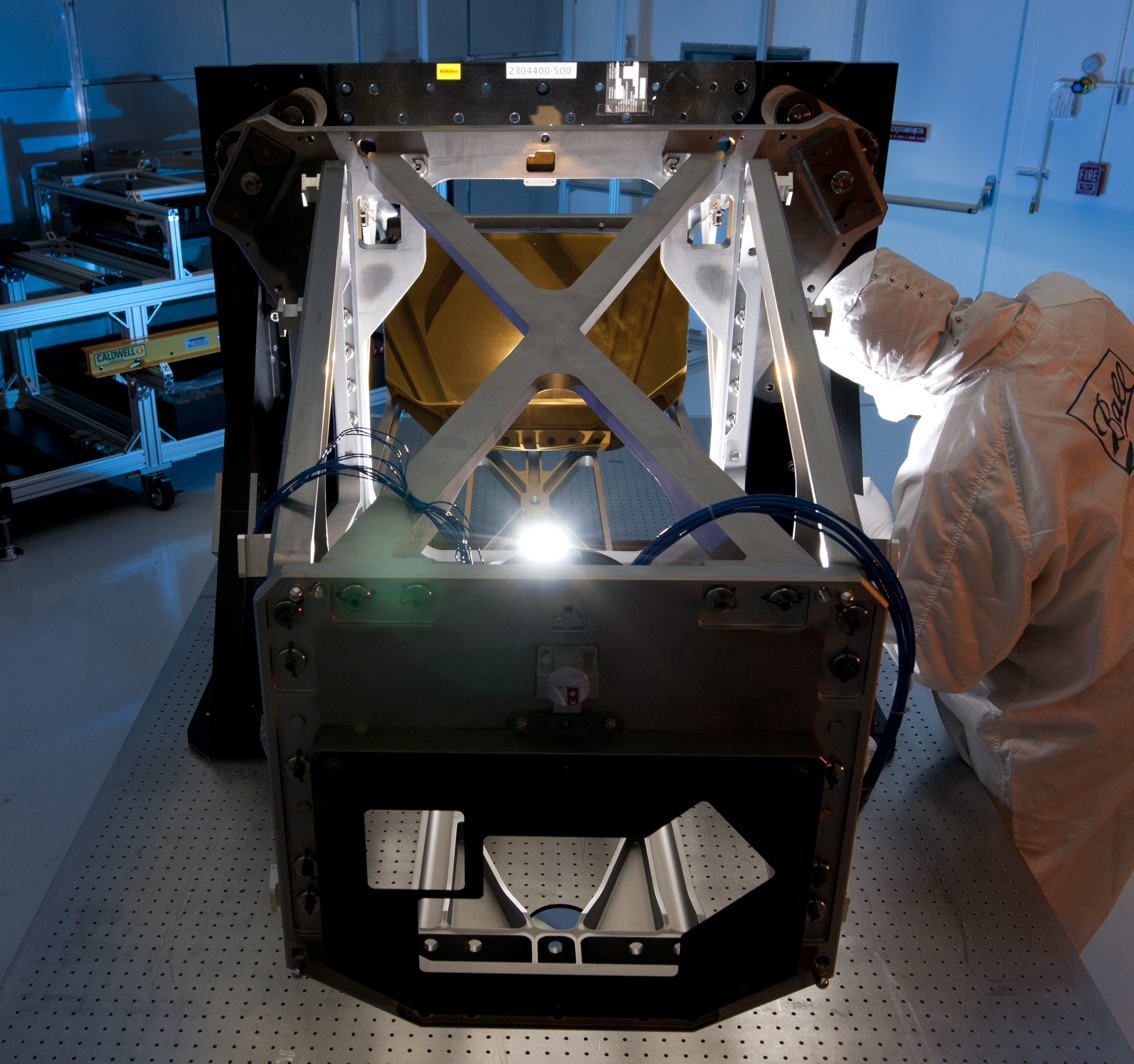
Testing of the Aft Optic Subsytem in 2011, which contains the Tertiary (3rd) mirror and Fine Steering Mirror

Some major parts of the OTE according to NASA:

- Primary mirror (18 segments)
- Secondary mirror (74 cm (29 in) diameter)
- Tertiary mirror (3rd) (in Aft Optics Subsystem)
- Fine Steering Mirror (in Aft Optics Subsystem)
- Telescope structure
  - primary mirror backplane assembly
  - main backplane support fixture (BSF)
  - secondary mirror support structure
  - deployable tower array
- Thermal Management Subsystem
- Aft Deployable ISIM Radiator (ADIR)
- Wavefront sensing and control

The Aft Optics Subsystem includes the Tertiary mirror and the Fine Steering Mirror. One of the tasks for the Fine steering mirror is image stabilization.

The metal beryllium was chosen for a number of reasons including weight, but also for its low-temperature coefficient of thermal expansion compared to glass. Furthermore beryllium is not magnetic and a good conductor of electricity and heat. Other infrared telescopes that have used beryllium mirrors include IRAS, COBE, and Spitzer. The Subscale Beryllium Model Demonstrator (SBMD) was successfully tested at cryogenic temperatures, and one of the concerns was surface roughness at low kelvin numbers. The beryllium mirrors are coated with a very fine layer of gold to reflect infrared light. There are 18 hexagonal segments that are grouped together to create a single mirror with an overall diameter of 6.5 meters (21 ft).

== DTA ==
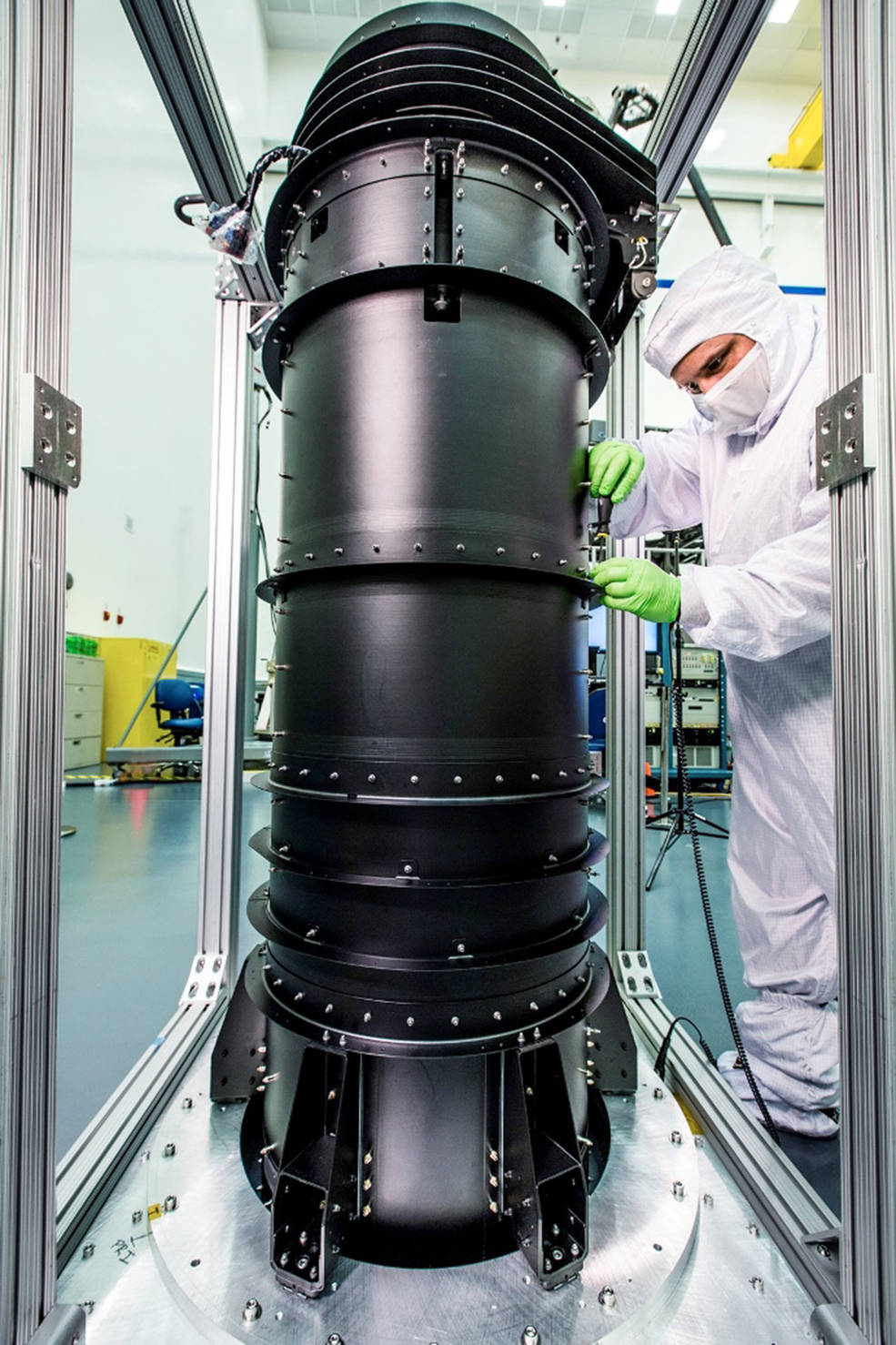
The Deployable Tower Assembly (DTA) is where OTE connects with the rest of telescope such as the spacecraft bus. During stowage there is another attachment point for the folded sunshield higher up on the OTE

At the base of the OTE is the critical Deployable Tower Assembly (DTA). component which connects the OTE to the spacecraft bus. It must expand to allow the Sunshield (JWST) to spread out, allowing the space between the five layers to expand. The sunshield segment has multiple components, including six spreaders at the outer edge to spread the layers out at the six extremities.

During launch the DTA is shrunk down, but must extend at the right moment. The extended DTA structure allows the sun shield layers to be fully spread-out. The DTA must also thermally isolate the cold section of the OTE from the hot spacecraft bus. The Sunshield will protect the OTE from direct sunlight and reduce the thermal radiation hitting it, but another aspect is the OTE's physical connection to the rest of the spacecraft. (see Thermal conduction and Heat transfer) Whereas the sunshield stops the telescope getting hot due to radiated heat from the Sun, the DTA must insulate the telescope from the heat of the rest of the structure, similar to the way an insulated pan handle protects from the heat of a stove.

The DTA extends by means of two telescoping tubes that can slide between each other on rollers. There is an inner tube and an outer tube. The DTA is extended by an electric motor that rotates a ball screw nut which pushes the two tubes apart. When the DTA is fully deployed it is 3 meters (10 ft) long. The DTA tubes are made of graphite-composite carbon fiber, and it is intended that they will be able to survive the conditions in space.

== Timeline ==
- December 2001: final results from the SBMD test published.
- April 2012: primary mirror backplane support structure completed.
- November 2015: first primary mirror segment installed.
- December 2015: half of the primary mirror segments installed.
- February 3, 2016: last of the 18 primary mirror segments installed.
- March 3, 2016: secondary mirror installed
- March 2016: Aft Optics Subsystem installed.
- May 2016: OTE and ISIM are merged into the OTIS, which is the combination of these two sections.

== Development testbeds ==
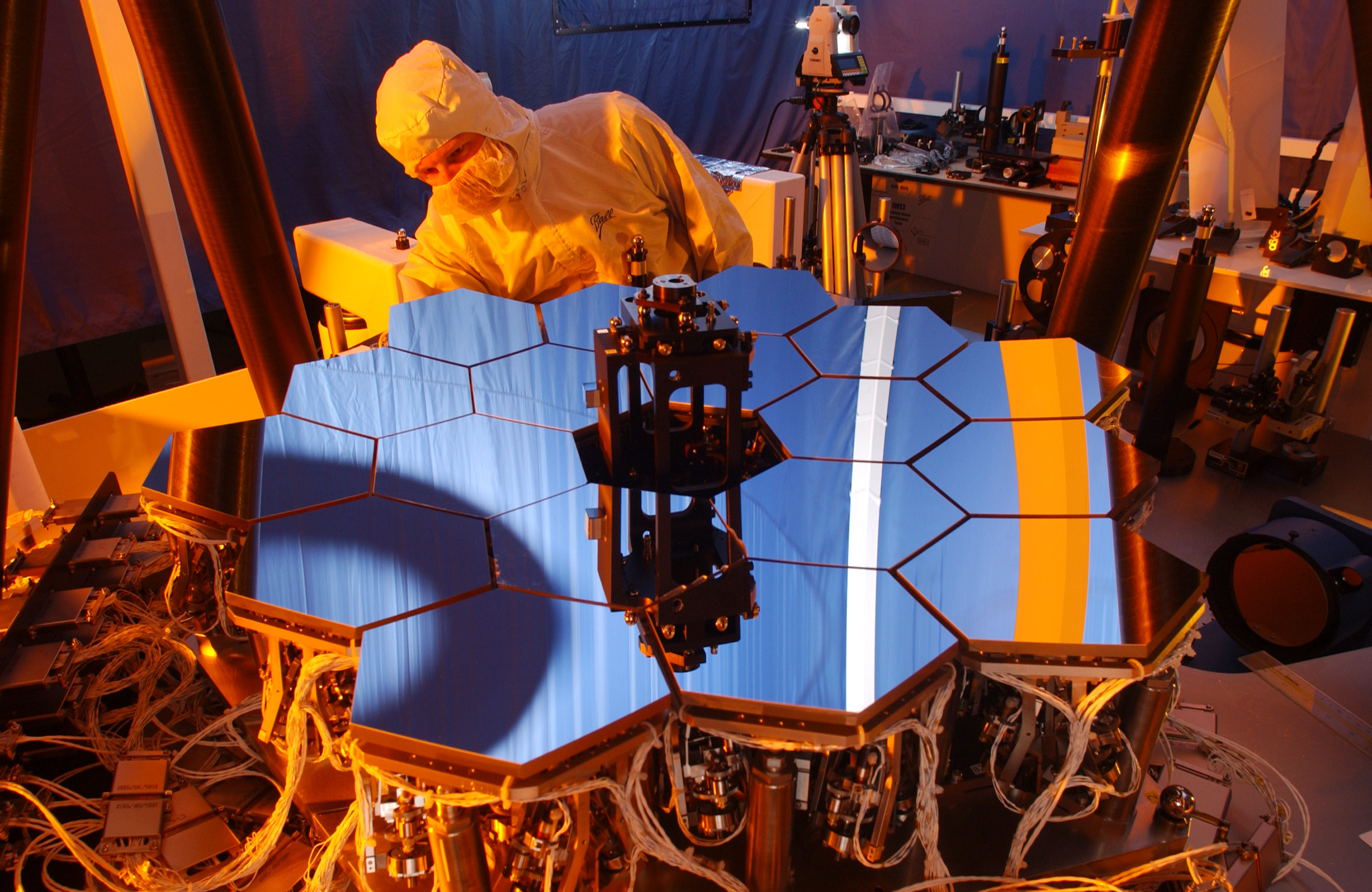
A one sixth scale test version of the primary mirror

Achieving a working main mirror was considered one of the greatest challenges of JWST development. Part of the JWST development included validating and testing JWST on various testbeds of different functions and sizes.

Some types of development items include pathfinders, test beds, and engineering test units. Sometimes a single item can be used for different functions, or it may not be a physically created item at all, but rather a software simulation. The NEXUS space telescope was a complete space telescope, but essentially a scaled down JWST but with a number of changes including only three mirror segments with one folding out for a main mirror diameter of 2.8 meters (9.2 ft). It was lighter, so it was envisioned it could be launched as early as 2004 on a Delta 2 launch rocket. The design was cancelled at the end of 2000. At that time NGST/JWST was still a 8-meter (26 ft) design, with an area of 50 m^{2} (540 sq ft), a few years later this was reduced eventually to the 6.5-meter (21 ft) design, with an area of 25 m^{2} (270 sq ft).

=== OTE Pathfinder ===
One part of JWST development was the production of the Optical Telescope Element Pathfinder. The OTE pathfinder uses two additional mirror segments, and additional secondary mirror, and puts together various structures to allow testing of various aspects of the section, including Ground Support Equipment. This supports the GSE being used on the JWST itself later on, and allows testing of mirror integration. OTE pathfinder as 12 rather than 18 cells compared to the full telescope, but it does include a test of the backplane structure.

=== Additional tests/models ===
Primary mirror size comparison between the James Webb Space Telescope (JWST) and Hubble Space Telescope (HST)

There are many test articles and developmental demonstrators for the creation of JWST. Some important ones were early demonstrators, that showed that many of fundamental technologies of JWST were possible. Other test articles are important for risk mitigation, essentially reducing the overall risk of the program by practicing on something other than the actual flight spacecraft.

Another testbed, the Test Bed Telescope, was a 1/6th scale model of the main mirror, with polished segments and working actuators, operating at room temperature, and used to test all the processes for aligning the segments of JWST. Another optics testbed is called JOST, which stands for JWST Optical Simulation Testbed, and uses an MEMS with hexagonal segments to simulate the degrees of freedom of the primary mirror alignment and phasing.

The Subscale Beryllium Model Demonstrator (SBMD) was fabricated and tested by 2001 and demonstrated enabling technologies for what was soon Christened the James Webb Space Telescope, previously the Next Generation Space Telescope (NGST). The SBMD was a half-meter diameter mirror made from powdered beryllium. The weight of the mirror was then reduced through a mirror-making process called "light-weighting", where material is removed without disrupting its reflecting ability, and in this case 90% of the SBMD mass was removed. It was then mounted to a rigid backplane with titanium bipod flexures and underwent various tests. This included freezing it down to the low temperatures required and seeing how it behaved optically and physically. The tests were conducted with the Optical Testing System (aka the OTS) which was created specifically to test the SBMD. The SBMD had to meet the requirements for a space-based mirror, and these lessons were important to the development of the JWST. The tests were conducted at the X-Ray Calibration Facility (XRCF) at Marshall Space Flight Center (MSFC) in the U.S. State of Alabama.

The Optical Testing System (OTS) had to be developed to test the SBMD (the NGST mirror prototype) under cryogenic vacuum conditions. The OTS included a WaveScope Shack-Hartmann sensor and a Leica Disto Pro distance measurement instrument.

Some JWST technology Testbeds, Pathfinders, etc.:

- OTE Pathfinder.
- TBT (1/6th scale testbed)
- JOST (JWST Optical Simulation Testbed)
- SBMD (Subscale Beryllium Model Demonstrator)
- OTS (test system for SBMD)
- ITM (this is a software model)
- OSIM (OTE Simulator)
- Beam Image Analyzer

Another related program was the Advanced Mirror System Demonstrator (AMSD) program. The AMSD results were utilized in construction of beryllium mirrors.

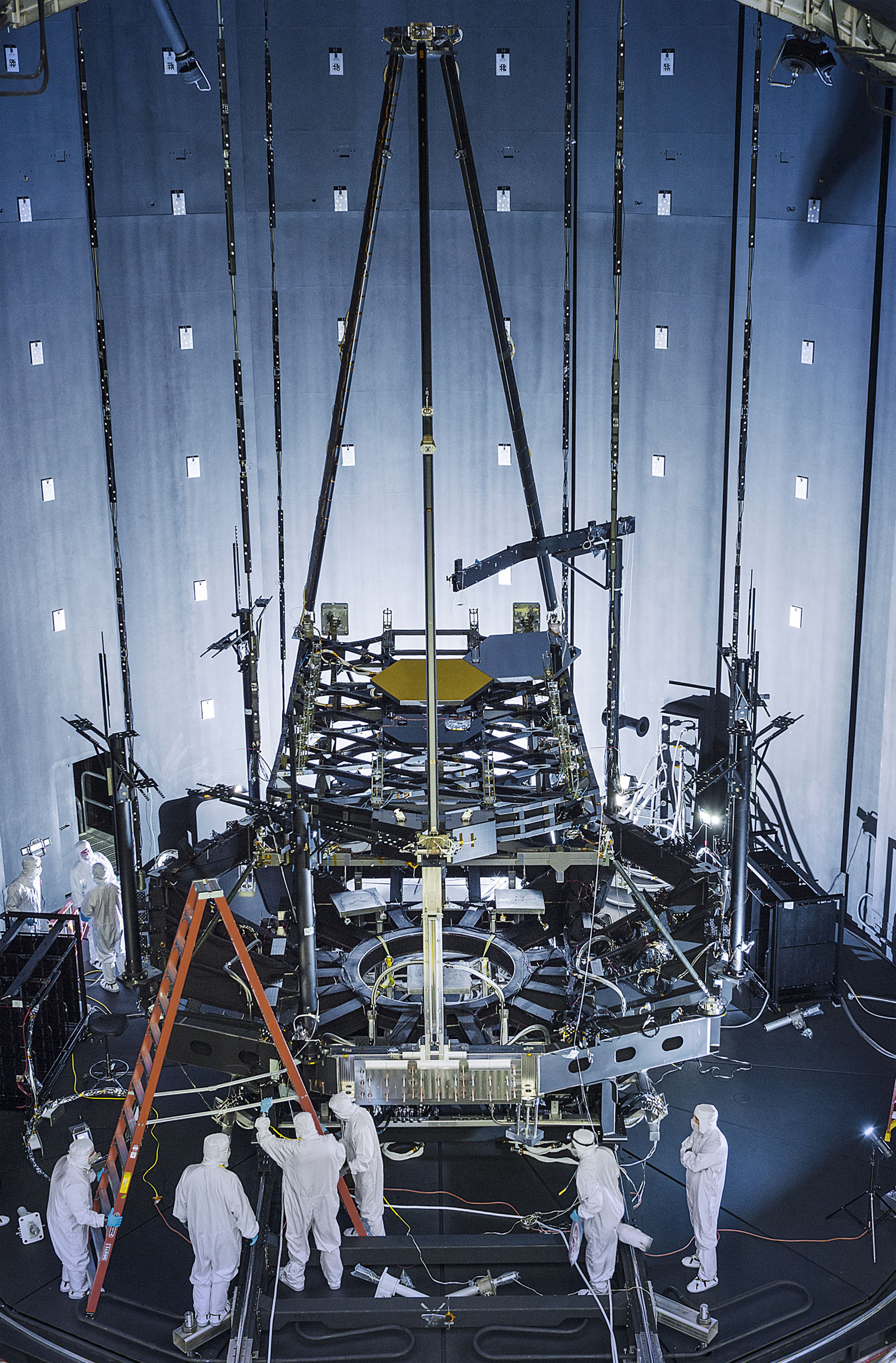
OTE pathfinder heads into a thermal vacuum chamber, 2015

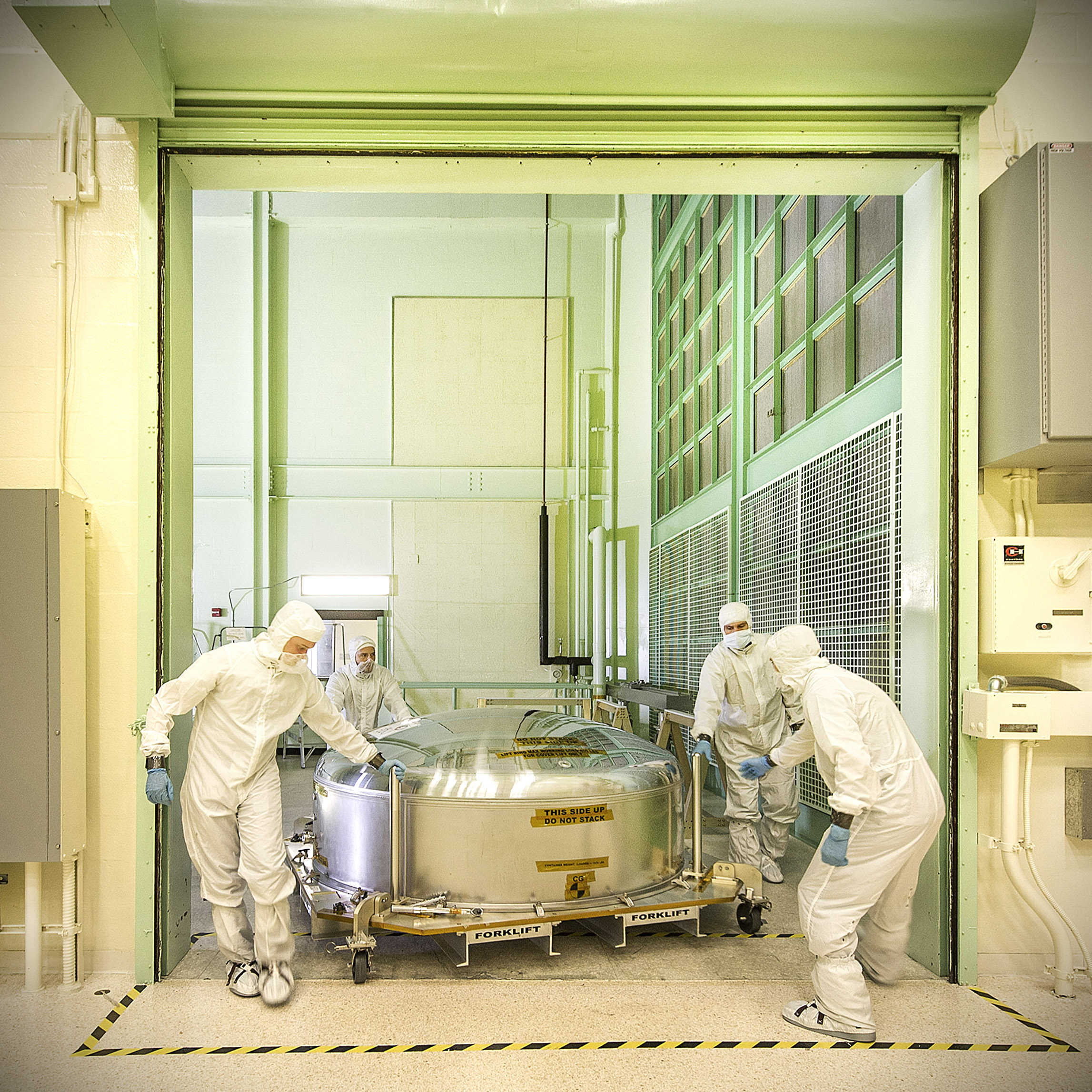
Engineering Test Unit (ETU) mirror segment being hauled into a cleanroom in its container, 2013

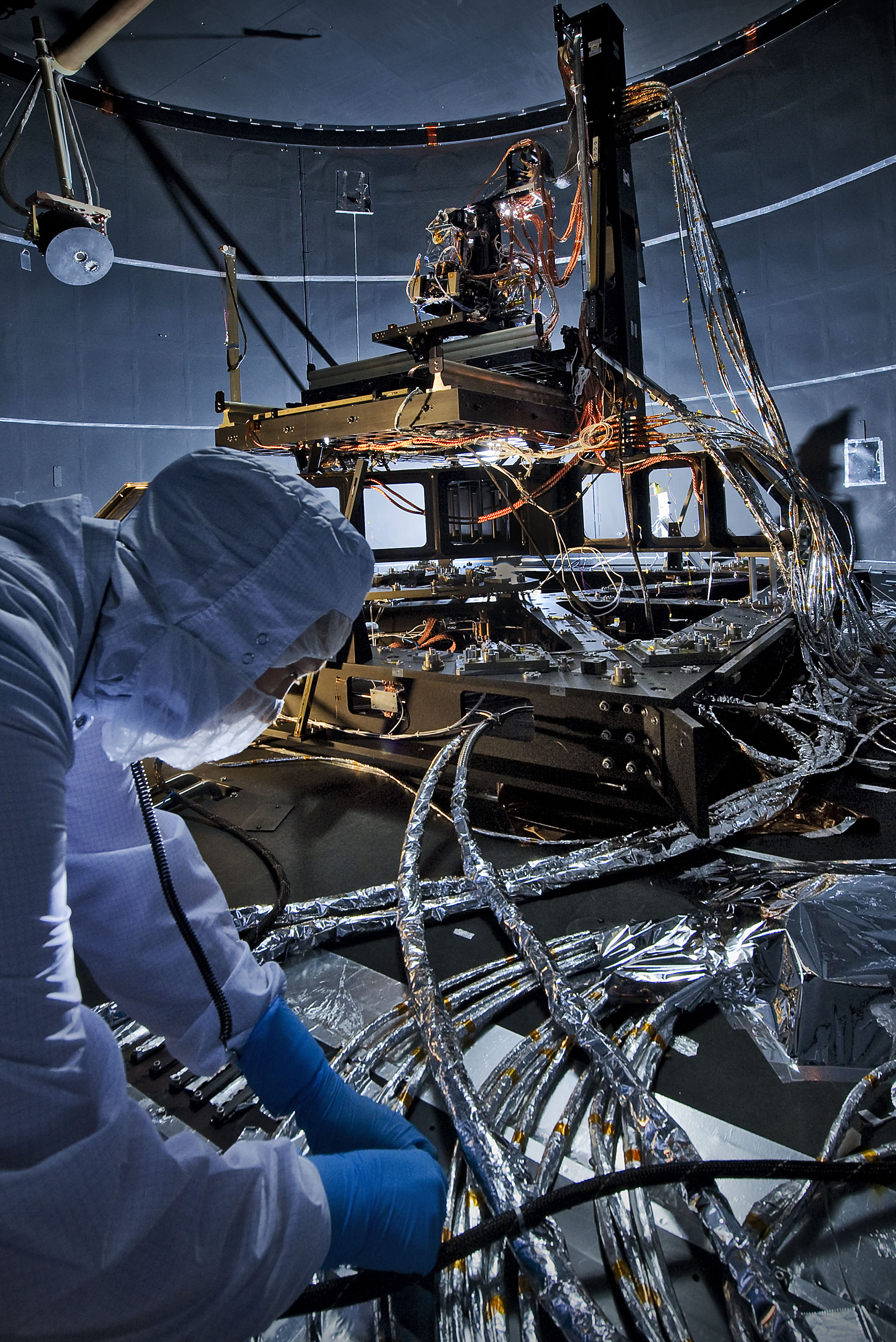
The Beam Image Analyzer is shown, being prepared to test OSIM under a cryogenic vacuum, 2012.

== Diagram 1 ==
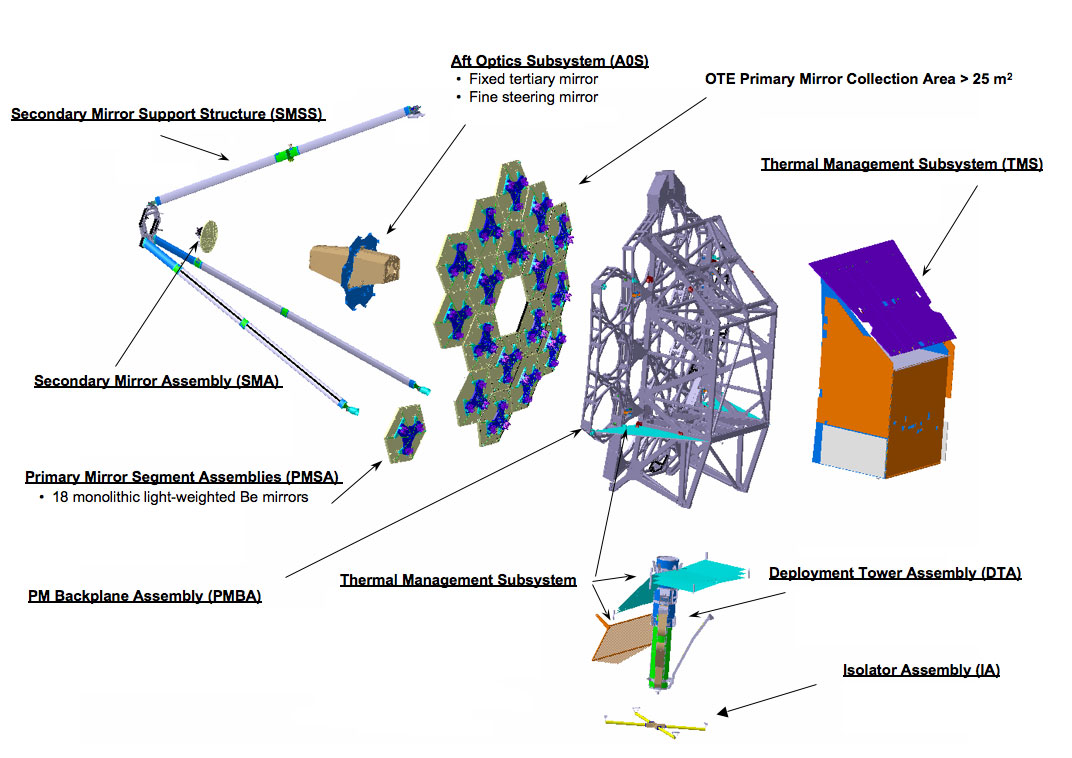
Labeled diagram of components of the Optical Telescope Element

== Gallery ==
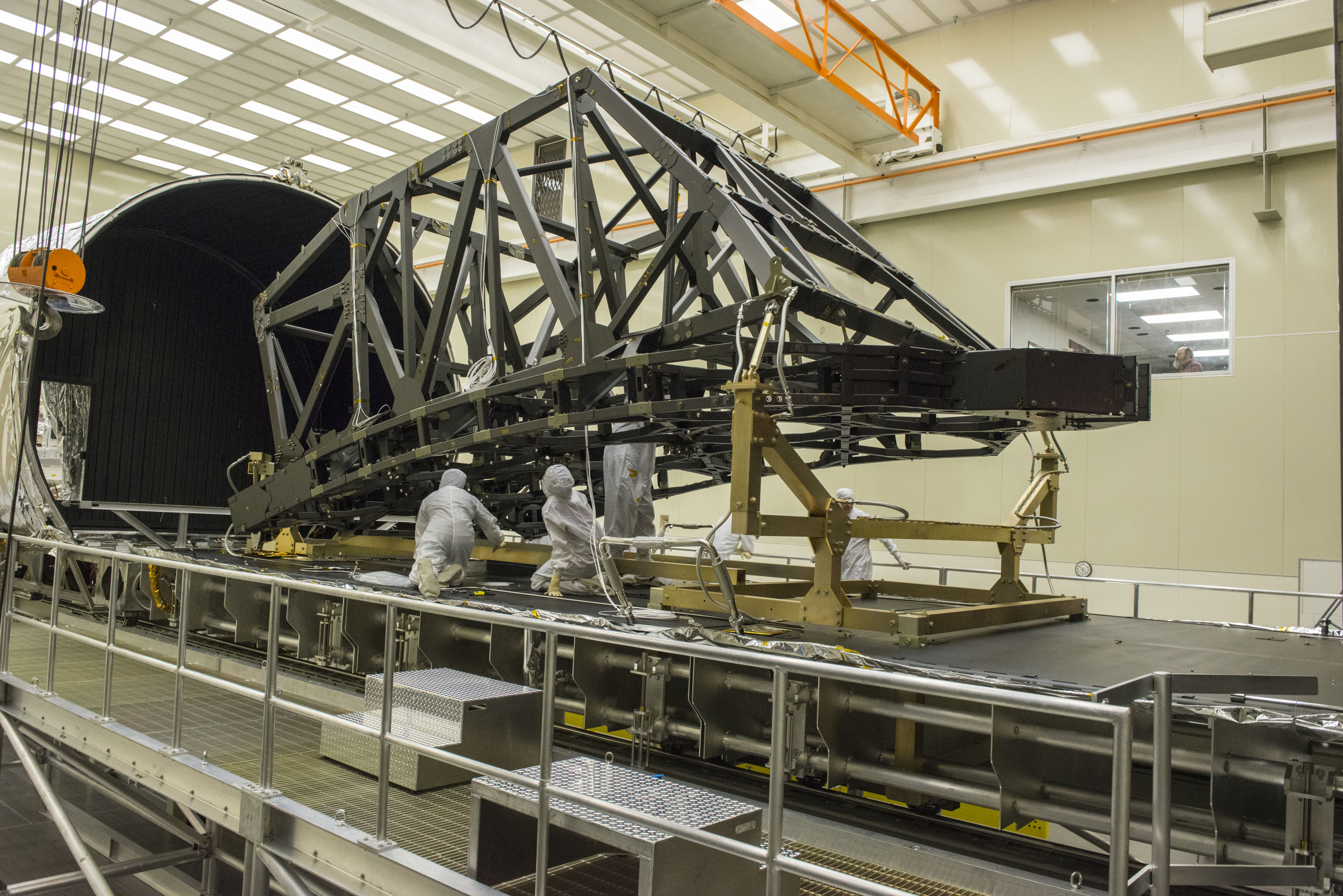
Backplane after being tested at Marshall Space Flight, 2013

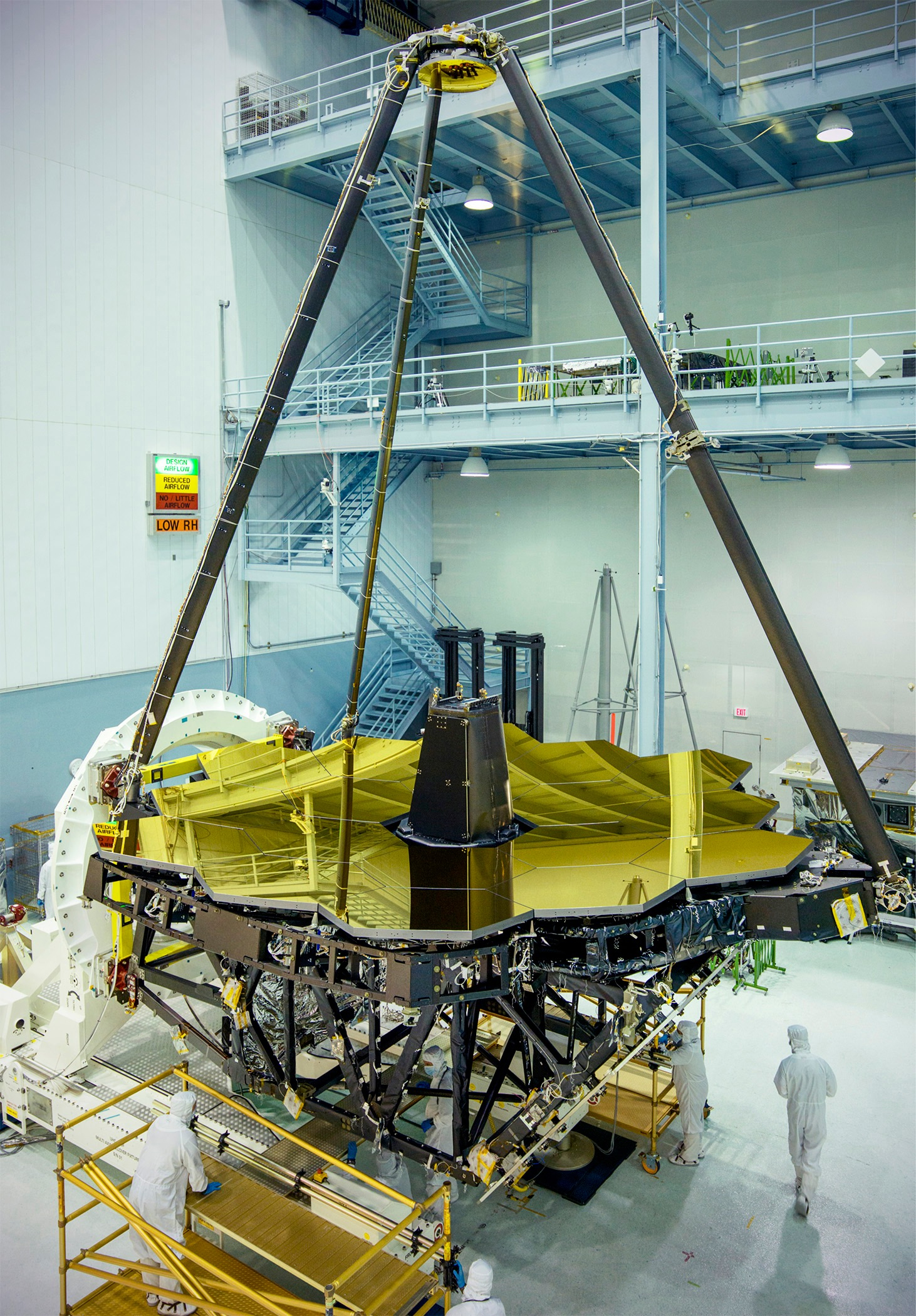
OTE assembled in April 2016

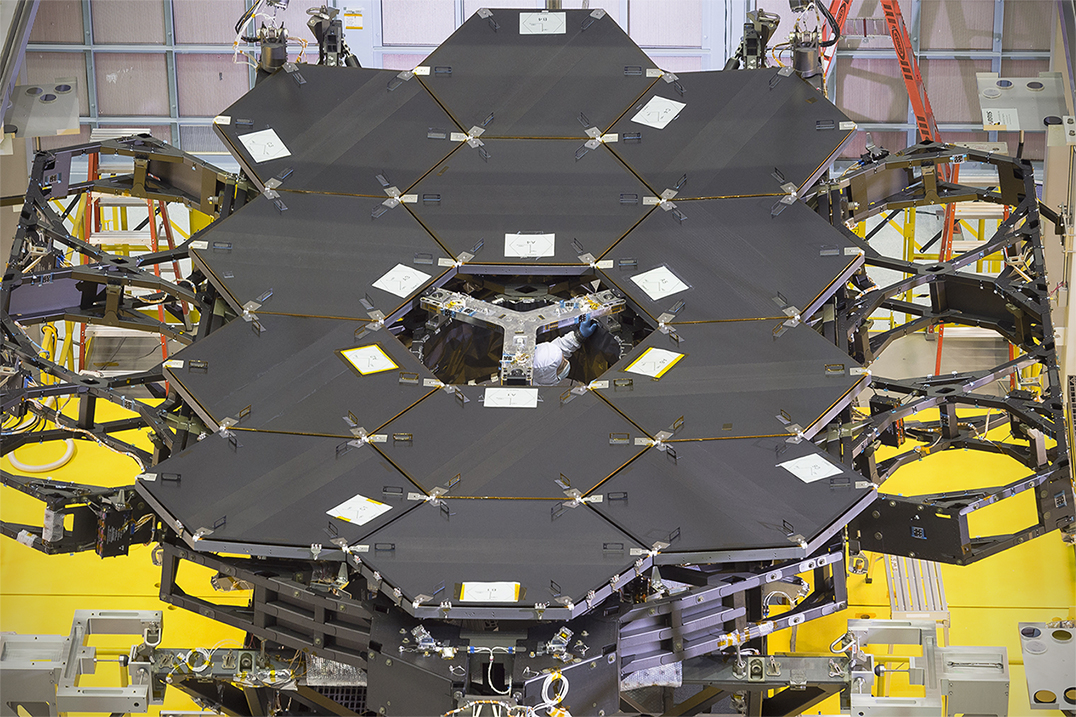
Backplane with 12 of 18 segments attached, the segments are covered over for protection

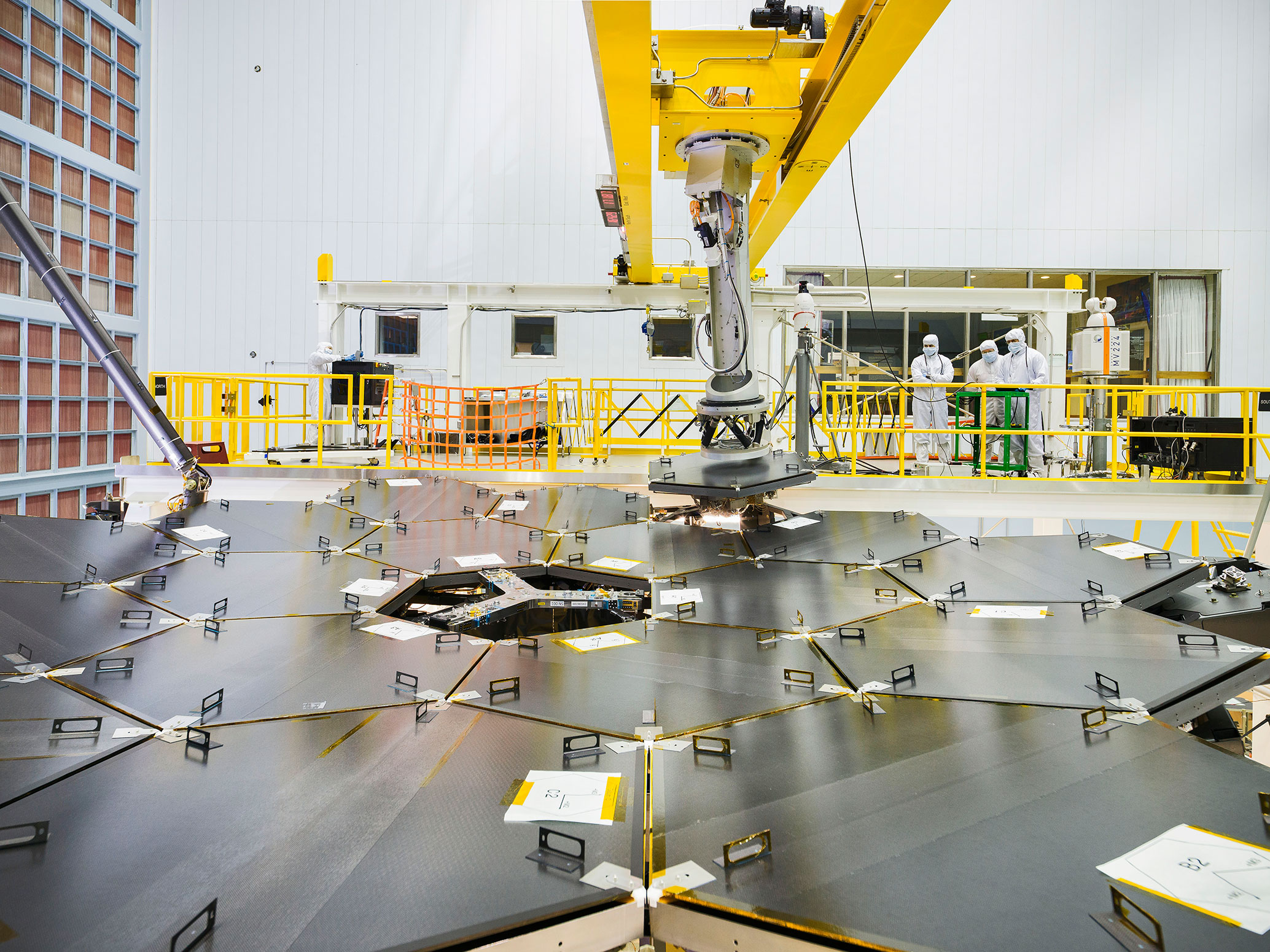
Primary mirror almost fully assembled (18/18 segments), with covers, robotic arm holding the last segment, February 2016

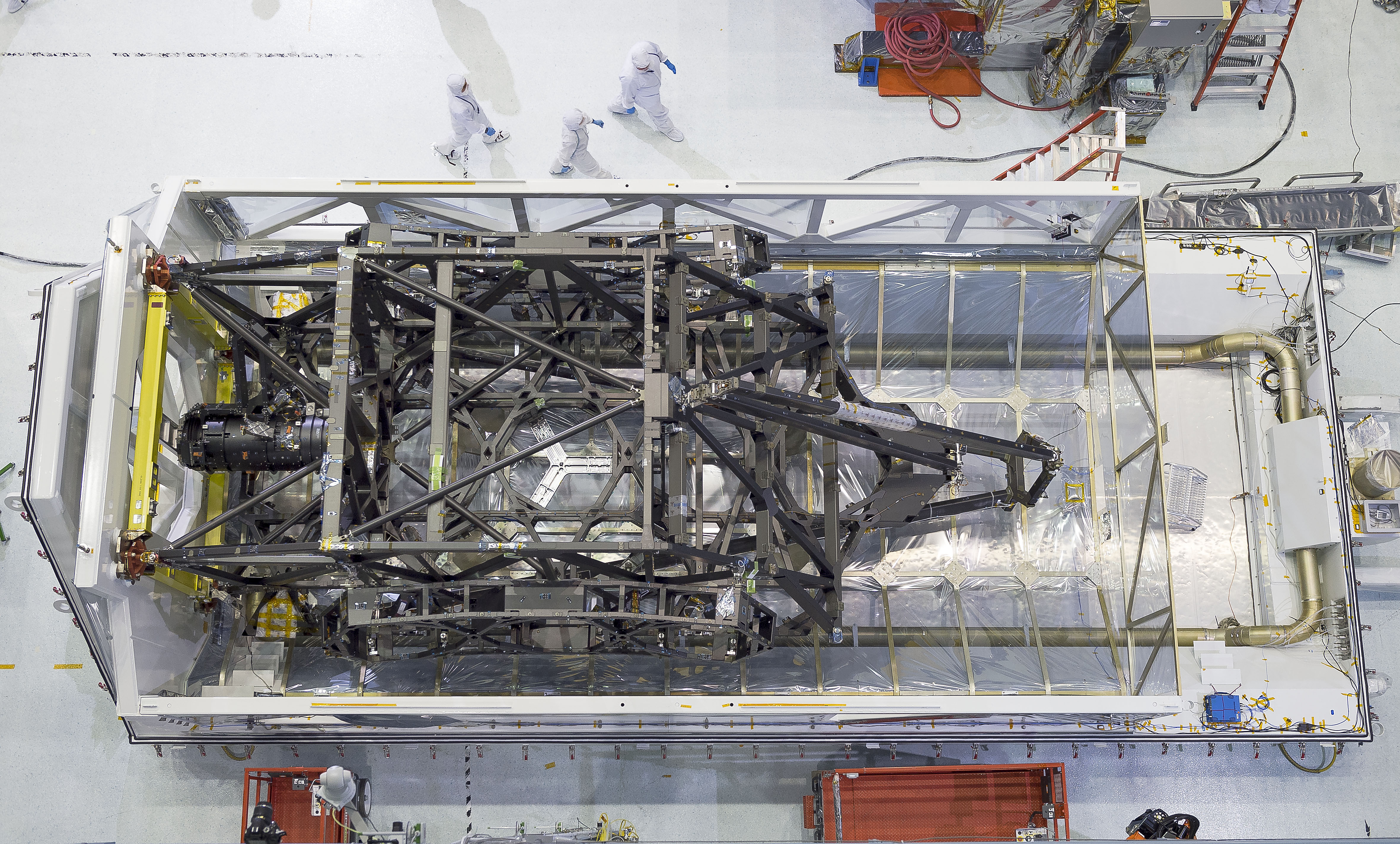
Backplane assembly arrives at Goddard, 2015

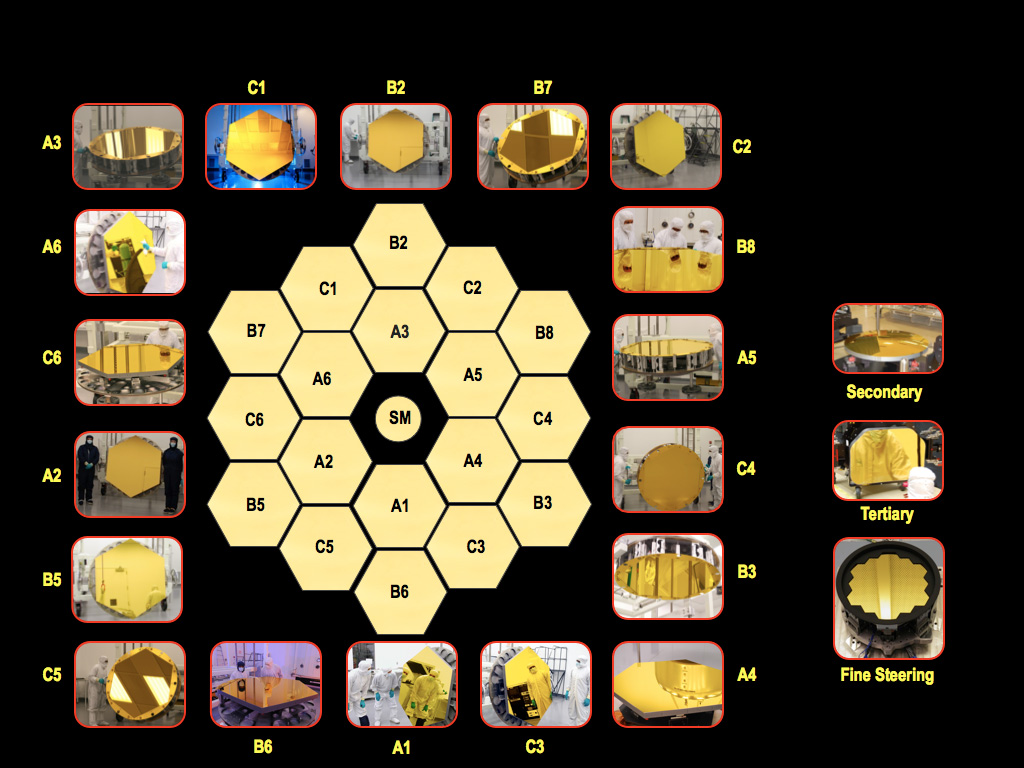
All components of the Optical Telescope Element

== See also ==
- Integrated Science Instrument Module (ISIM) (another major JWST section)
- Primary mirror
- Secondary mirror
- Segmented mirror
- James Webb Space Telescope timeline
- Cryogenics
