= Timeline of the James Webb Space Telescope =

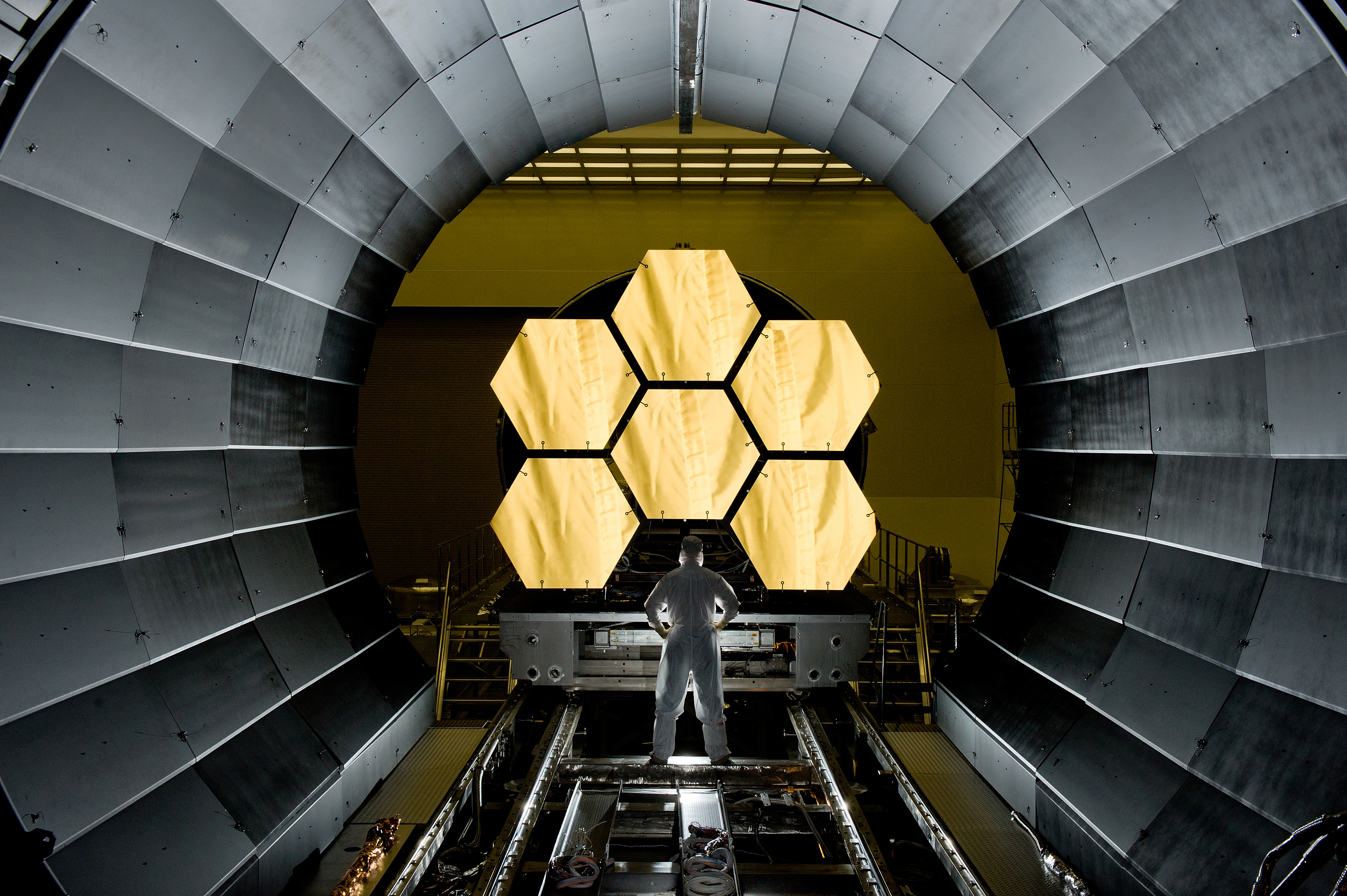
The first six primary mirror segments being prepared for final cryogenic acceptance testing, 2011

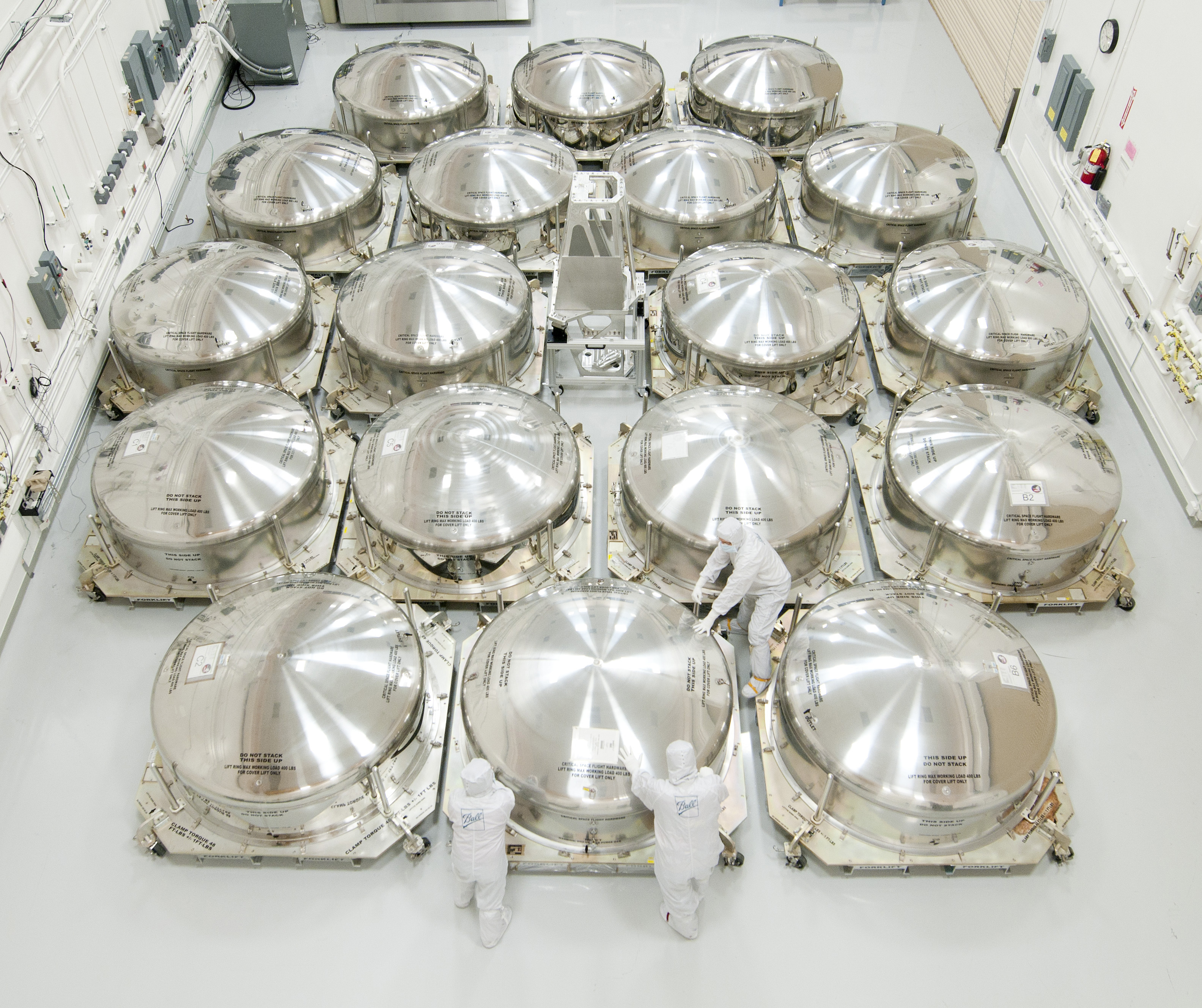
The 18 main mirror segments for JWST in special shipping cans, 2012

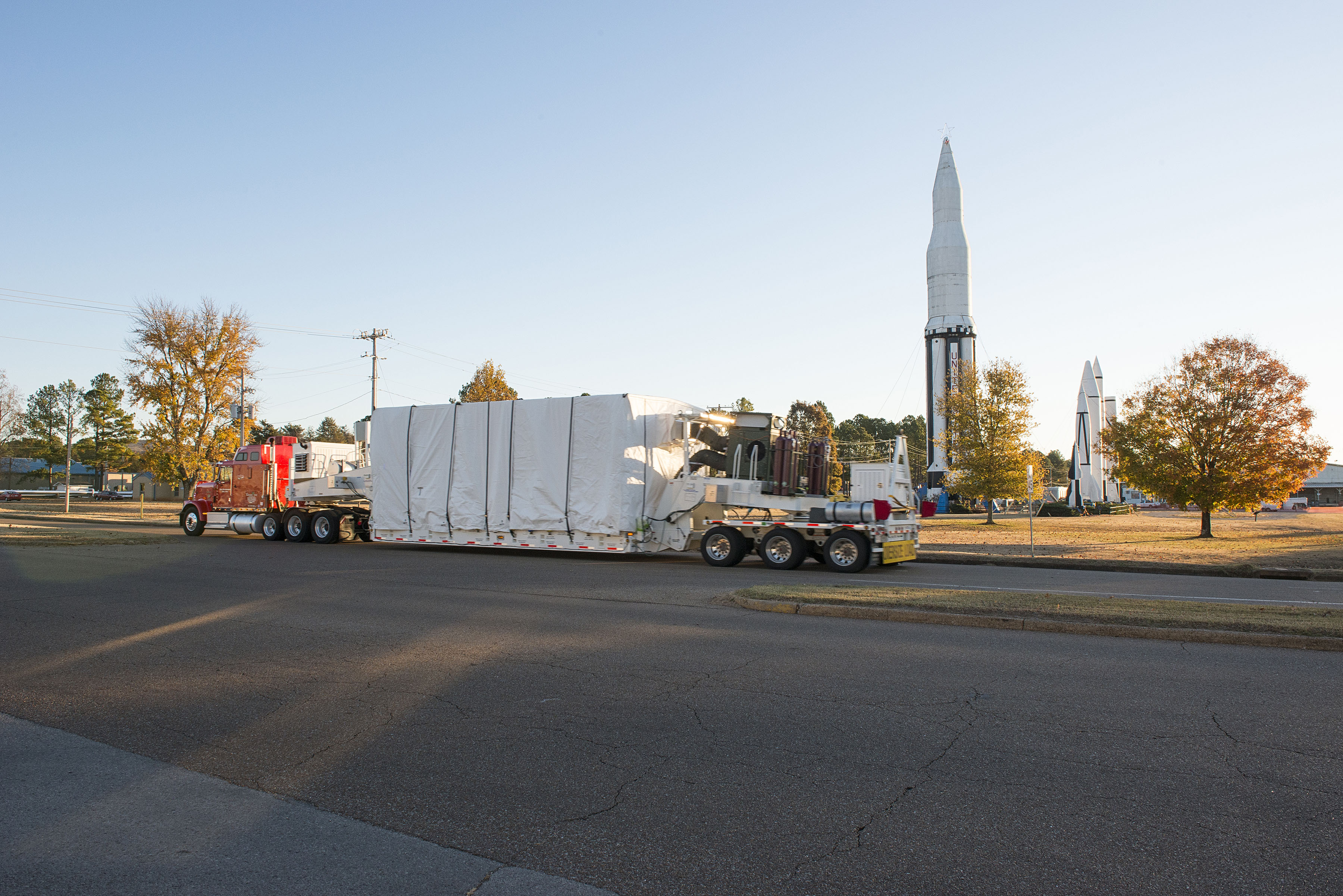
Backplane being transported to California, 2013

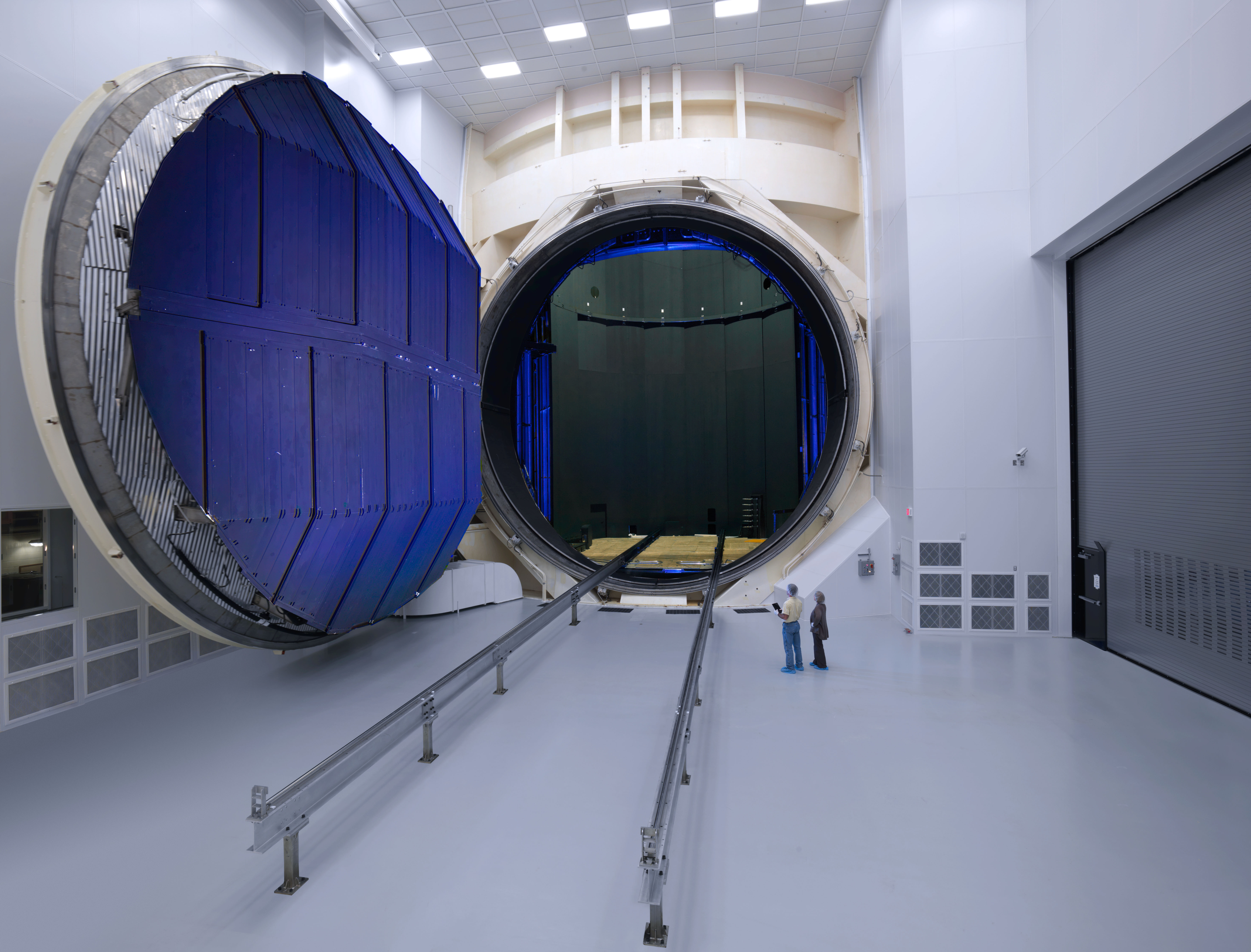
Vacuum Chamber A prepared for the James Webb Space Telescope, 2014

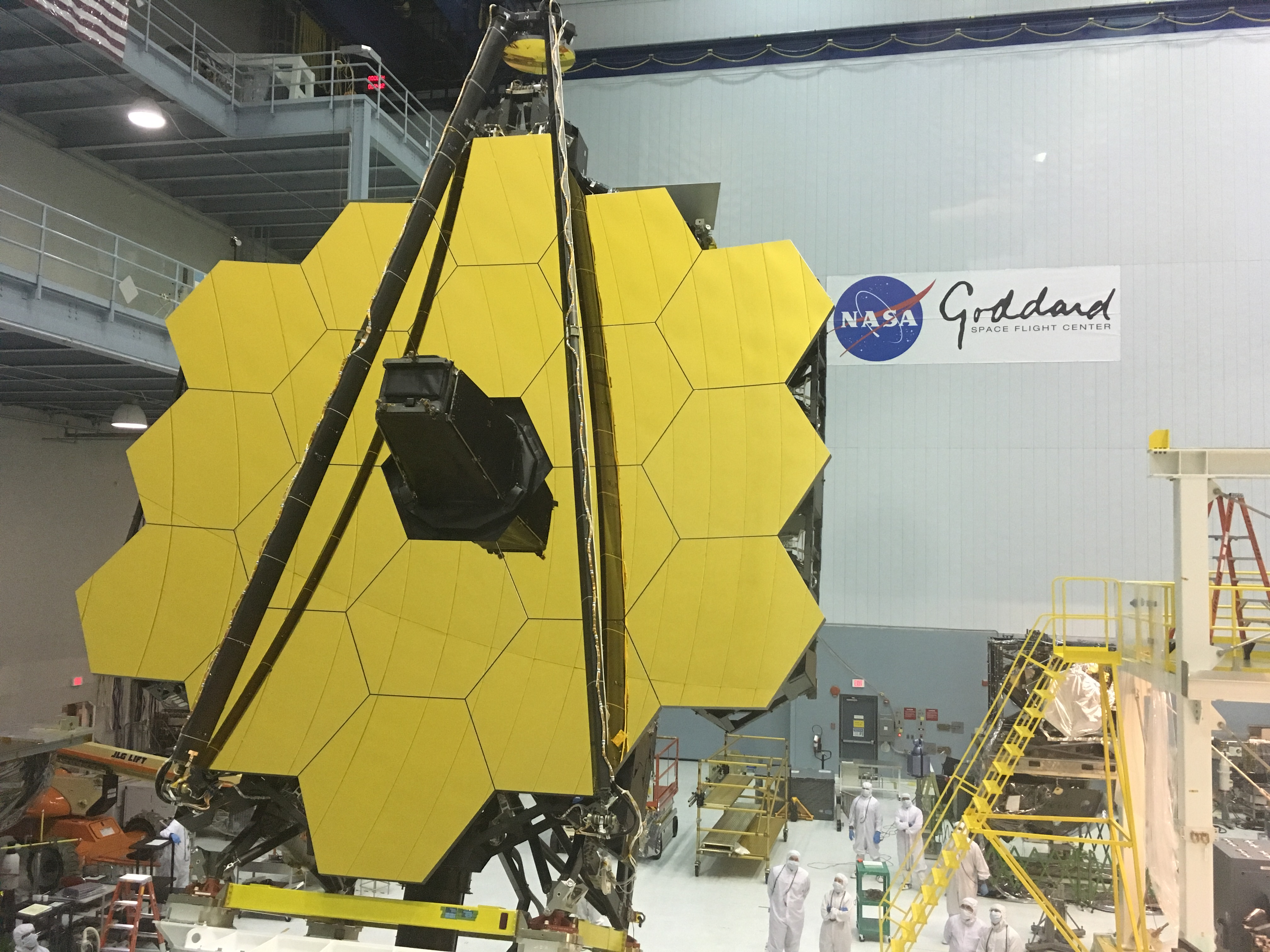
Main mirror assembled, May 2016

The James Webb Space Telescope (JWST) is an international 21st-century space observatory that was launched on 25 December 2021. It is intended to be the premier observatory of the 2020s, combining the largest mirror yet on a near-infrared space telescope with a suite of technologically advanced instruments from around the world.

The telescope is designed to last at least five and a half years (six months calibration plus five years science operations), but with a goal of ten years. The limiting factor is expected to be fuel to maintain its halo orbit, of which there is enough for at least ten years.

It was announced in December 2021 that due to the accuracy of the orbital insertion and course correction burns, the telescope had more fuel available than originally planned and could operate for "significantly" longer than the original ten year planned life span.

JWST cost approximately $10 billion in its design, construction, and five years of operations (does not include extended mission funding), as well as international contributions.

== Timeline of selected events ==
- 1996: Next Generation Space Telescope initiated.
- 2000: NEXUS cancelled (JWST technology demo).
- September 2002: NGST named James Webb Space Telescope.
- 11 September 2003: $824.8 million prime contract for JWST awarded to TRW.
- January 2007: 9/10 technology development items pass non-advocate review.
- April 2010: technical part of Mission Critical Design Review (MCDR) passes.
- July 2011: James Webb project threatened with cancellation.
- November 2011: JWST survives cancellation attempt.
- 2012: MIRI instrument hand-off.
- March 2013: FGS/NIRISS installed in the Integrated Science Instrument Module (ISIM).
- 4 July 2013: MIRI installed in ISIM.
- March 2014: NIRCam installed in ISIM
- 24–25 March 2014: NIRSpec integrated into ISIM.
- June 2014: first combined test of all four instruments including cryogenic testing in the Goddard Space Environment Simulator.
- 2014: peak U.S. funding hit $650 million this year.
- December 2015: contract for JWST's launcher signed with a launch date of October 2018.
- February 2016: hexagonal segments of the primary mirror assembled.
- March 2016: cryogenic testing of instruments and mirrors completed.
- 3 March 2016: secondary mirror installed on Optical Telescope Element (OTE).
- March 2016: Aft Optics Subsystem installed on OTE.
- November 2016: JWST construction completed, with additional testing to come.
- January 2017: JWST is fine after experiencing an anomaly during vibration testing in Dec 2016.
- 27 March 2018: JWST launch delayed to at least May 2020 as issues arise, including ones with the propulsion system and potential snagging of the sunshield.
- 27 June 2018: JWST launch postponed to 30 March 2021 based on recommendations by an Independent Review Board.
- 16 July 2020: JWST launch postponed to 31 October 2021 due to the impacts of the COVID-19 pandemic as well as technical challenges.
- 1 June 2021: JWST launch postponed to no earlier than November 2021 due to concerns regarding the readiness of the Ariane 5 launch vehicle and launch site.
- 8 September 2021: JWST launch postponed to 18 December 2021.
- 22 November 2021: JWST launch delayed to no earlier than 22 December 2021, to allow additional testing after experiencing vibrations due to an unplanned clamp release.
- 15 December 2021: JWST launch delayed to no earlier than 24 December 2021, due to an electrical fault, resulting in a communications error between the observatory and the Launch Vehicle.
- 21 December 2021: JWST launch delayed to no earlier than 12:20 UTC on 25 December 2021, due to adverse weather conditions at the launch site.
- 25 December 2021: liftoff at 12:20 UTC.
- 24 January 2022: JWST arrives at final orbit around the second Sun-Earth Lagrange point, or L2, nearly 1 million miles (1.51 million kilometers) away from the Earth.
- 11 July 2022: JWST has completed its commissioning activities and is ready to begin full scientific operations.
- 12 July 2022: JWST's first full-color images and spectroscopic data were released during a televised broadcast at 10:30 a.m. EDT (14:30 UTC) on Tuesday, July 12, 2022, from NASA's Goddard Space Flight Center in Greenbelt, Maryland.

=== Pre-launch plans ===
- 2016: OTE tests complete.
- 2017: OTIS tests complete.
- 2017: Spacecraft (including sunshield) tests complete.
- 2018: Observatory I&T complete.
- October 2018: planned launch date as of 2016.
- Early 2019: planned launch date as of October 2017.
- May 2020 or later: planned launch date as of March 2018.
- 30 March 2021: planned launch date as of June 2018.
- 31 October 2021: planned launch date as of July 2020.
- November 2021 or later: planned launch date as of June 2021.
- 22 December 2021: planned launch date as of November 2021.
- 24 December 2021: planned launch date after delay due to communication issues between the observatory and the Launch Vehicle.
- 25 December 2021: final launch date after delay due to forecasts of unfavorable weather during the launch window on 24 December.

== After-launch ==
- After launch, the James Webb Space Telescope was unfolded in the following planned order.
  1. spacecraft appendages (solar arrays, high gain antenna)
  2. sunshield
  3. extend tower
  4. secondary mirror
  5. primary mirror
- For 29 days after launch, JWST took a 1.51 million kilometer (940,000 mile) trajectory to L2 halo orbit.
- For six months JWST prepared for full-time science operation. This included letting all instruments cool down, calibrating the mirrors and instruments, and other procedures.
- Five-year science mission began after six months.
- Ten years of operation goal, and enough fuel to maintain halo orbit for at least ten years is included.

== After-launch deployment ==
Nominal deployment sequence

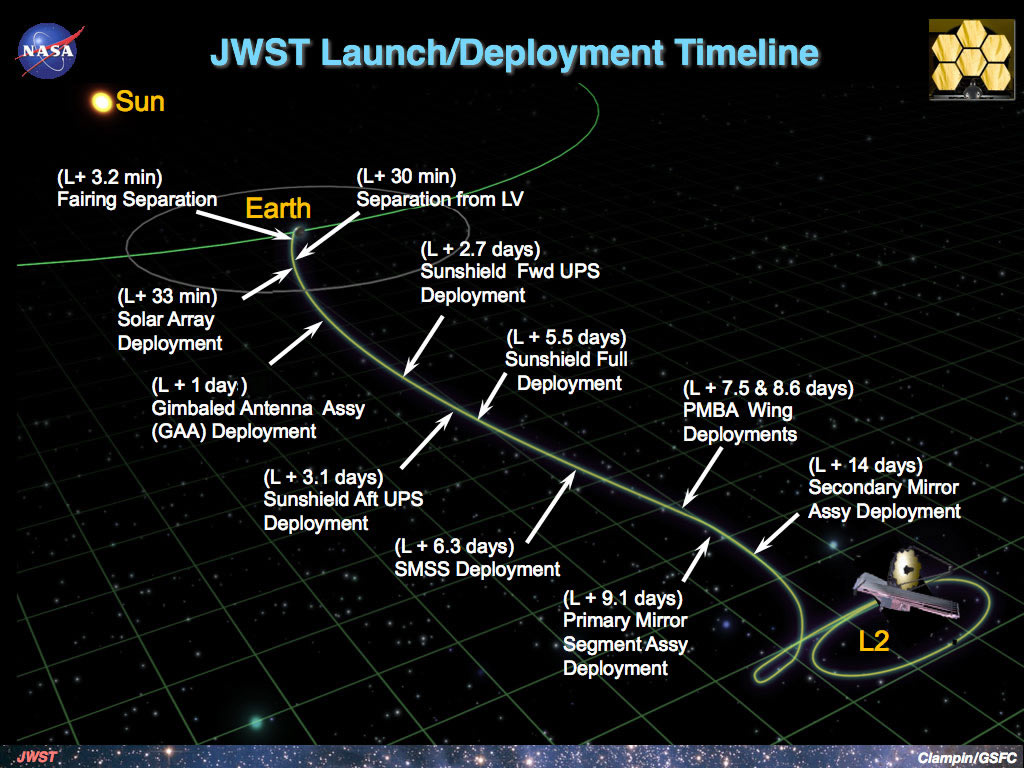
James Webb Space Telescope post-launch deployment timeline

Nearly a month after launch, a trajectory correction was initiated to place the James Webb Space Telescope into a halo orbit at L_{2}. Its next five months were spent cooling NIRCam and the Mid-Infrared Instrument down further, aligning and calibrating its mirrors while focusing on HD 84406, a bright star in the constellation Ursa Major, and testing the instruments.

== First images ==
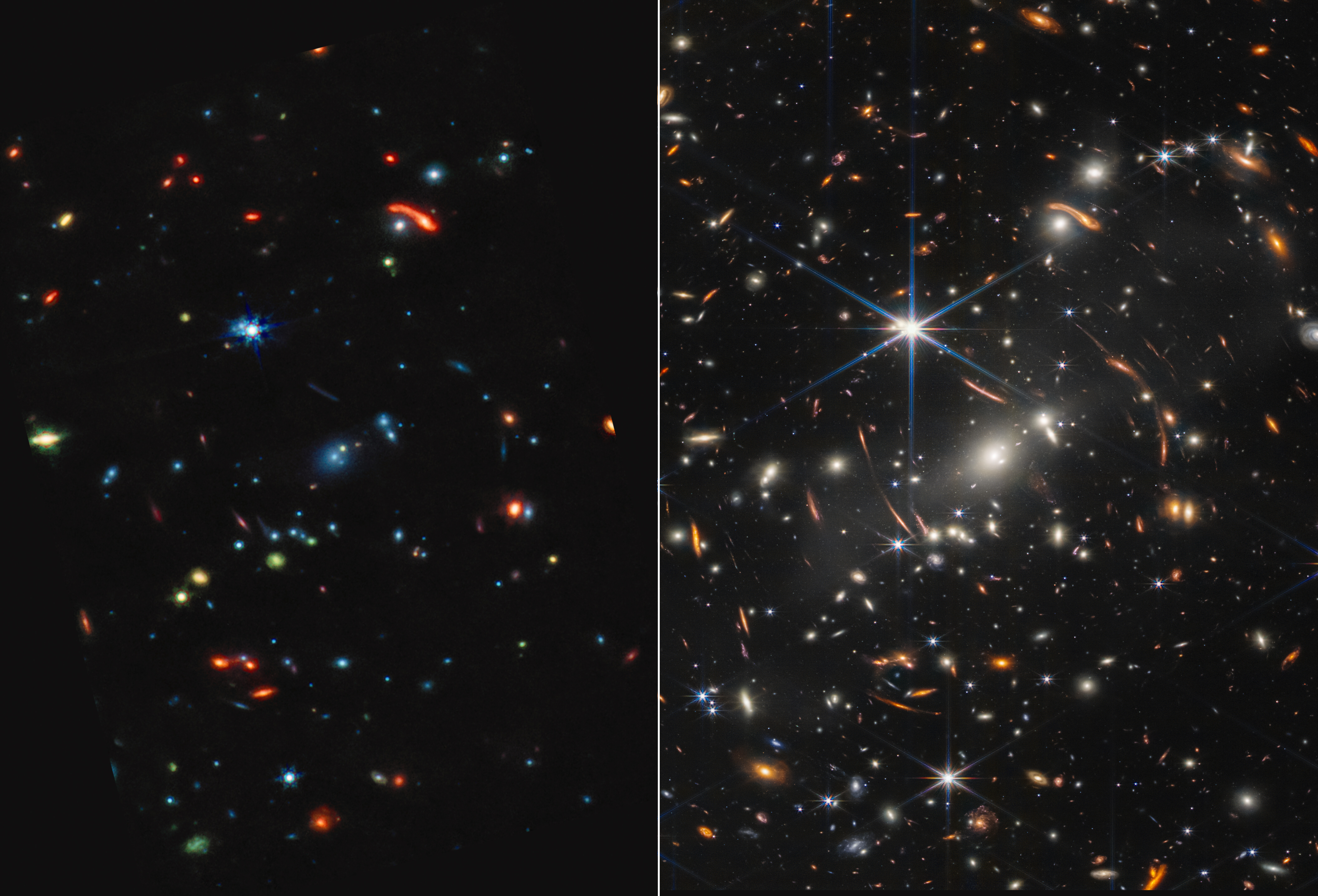
Webb’s First Deep Field (MIRI and NIRCam Images Side by Side), showing SMACS J0723.3-7327.

Webb's first operational image was the Webb's First Deep Field, released on July 11, 2022, with it being the deepest sharp infrared image of the universe to date. The rest of the first set of images was released the next day, which include full-color processed images of the Carina Nebula, Southern Ring Nebula, Stephan's Quintet, as well as spectroscopic data of WASP-96b.
