= OTE Pathfinder =

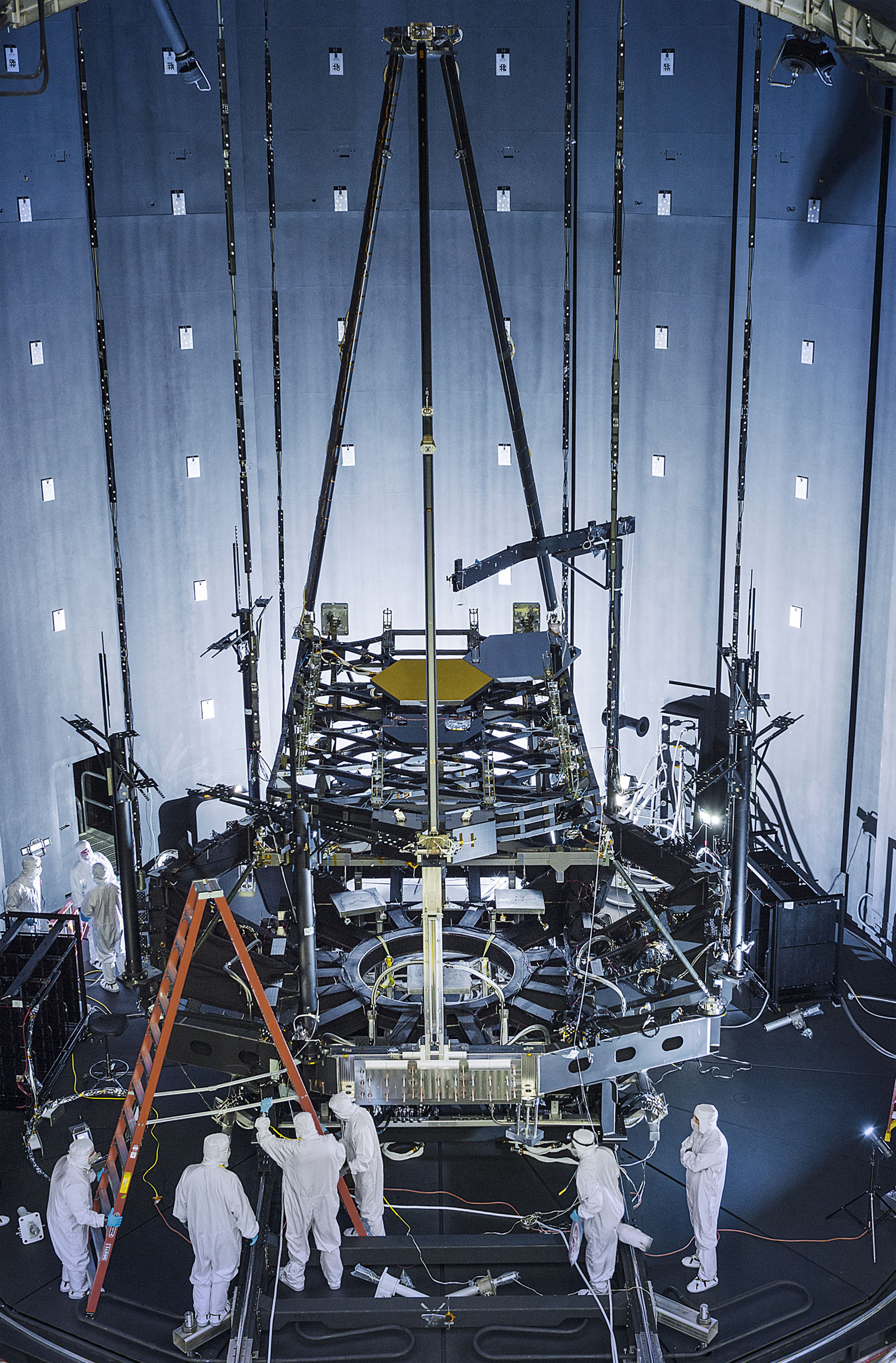
OTE Pathfinder in a test chamber

The OTE Pathfinder (for Optical Telescope Element Pathfinder), or James Webb Space Telescope Pathfinder, is a technology demonstrator and test article for the James Webb Space Telescope. It is a non-flight replica of the actual backplane, but only includes the center section, not the two "wings" on the side that extend and have additional segments on the actual JWST. It has been used for various tests and has some different configurations, but some of the major tests have been practicing installing mirror segments with non-flight hardware as well as thermal tests. The Pathfinder has also been tested in conjunction with flight hardware including the Aft Optics System. One of the goals and uses of the pathfinder is risk reduction for JWST program. The pathfinder allows practicing integration and testing procedures, and for risk mitigation With the Pathfinder it was possible to test phasing two mirrors together and also to do tests with the Aft Optical System. The OTE Pathfinder was part of the plan for integration and testing of JWST, and in particular supported the Optical Telescope Element (primary mirror, backplane, etc.).

The OTE pathfinder uses two additional mirror segments and an additional secondary mirror, and puts together various structures to allow testing of various aspects of the section, including Ground Support Equipment. This supports the GSE's use on the JWST itself later on, and allows testing of mirror integration. OTE pathfinder has 12 rather than 18 cells compared to the full telescope, but it does include a test of the backplane structure. The pathfinder allowed practicing installing mirror segments with a non-flight mirror and non-flight backplane. Mirror installation is a task that necessitated practice due to the high-precision required.

The Pathfinder backplane was completed in 2011. Three tests planned for the OTE Pathfinder were Optical Ground Support Equipment 1 (OGSE1), Optical Ground Support Equipment 2 (OGSE2), and Thermal Pathfinder.

The Pathfinder was used with the Beam Image Analyzer (BIA) and another important related device is the AOS Source Plate Assembly (ASPA). ASPA provides infrared sources for doing optical testing.

== California ==
The flight-replica backplane was assembled in Redondo Beach, California, at the NASA contractor Northrop Grumman facility there. The flight backplane has two wings and a center section, whereas the pathfinder just as center section. The backplane was transported across country (see Continental United States) in a C-5 Galaxy transport aircraft to Joint Base Andrews, and to GSC by road. The section is contained with the Space Telescope Transporter for Air Road and Sea (STTARS), which was designed for the project. This facilitates hauling items around the country for different tests or assembly for the JWST project.

The backplane is constructed out of graphite composite, titanium, and invar. Invar is an iron-nickel alloy with a low coefficient of thermal expansion (CTE or α), which means it does not significantly change size during temperature changes. One of the important features of the backplane is that it is thermally stable at low temperatures, because it is holding the main mirror, it must change size less than one-ten-thousandth of a human hair (32 nm) at −240 °C (−400 °F). Another test of the backplane design was the Backplane Structure Test Article, which was a one sixth portion of the full backplane.

== Maryland (Goddard Spaceflight Center) ==
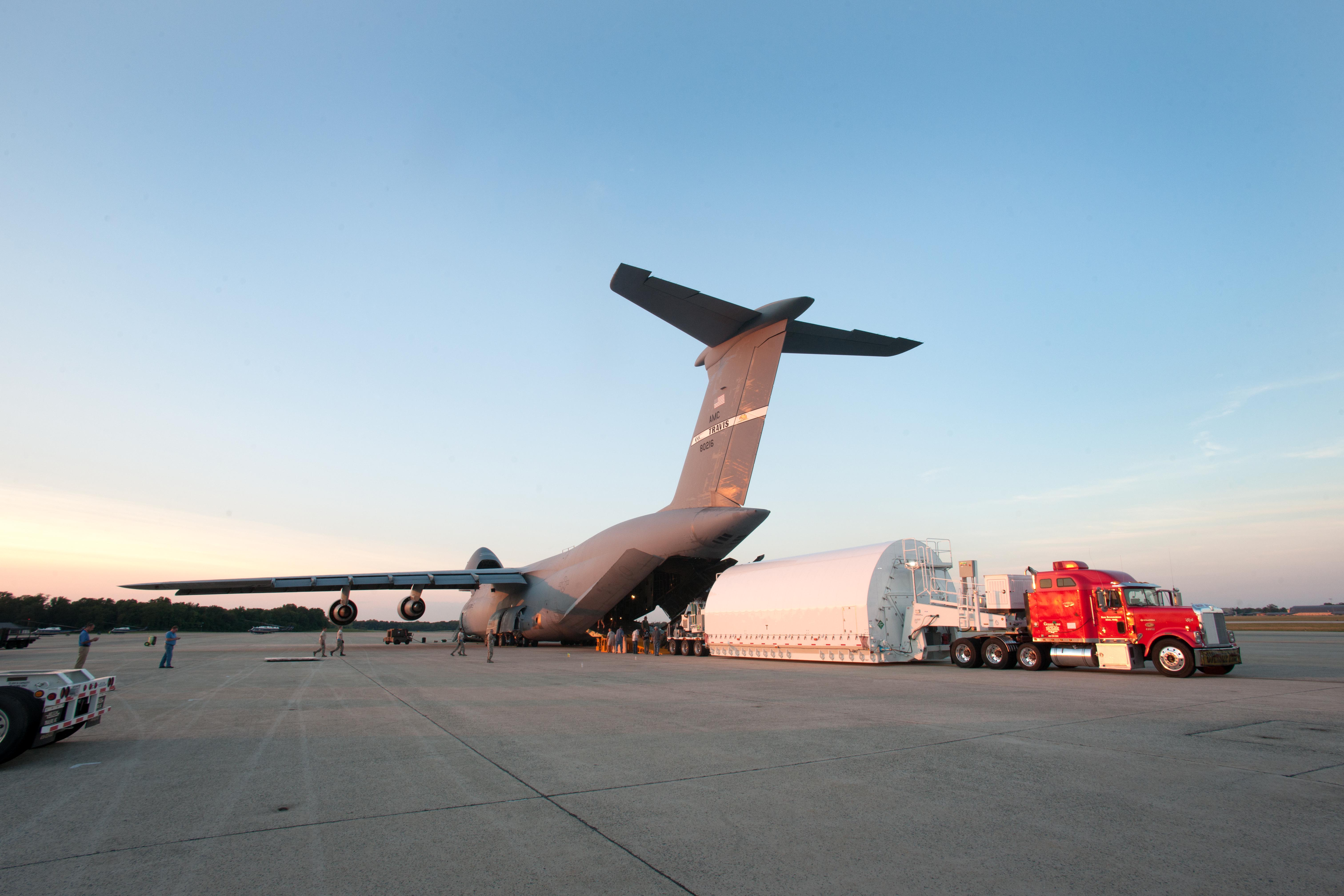
The Pathfinder is unloaded from a C-5 Galaxy in 2014. The Pathfinder Backplane is contained within the white container called STTARS (this stands for Space Telescope Transporter for Air Road and Sea)

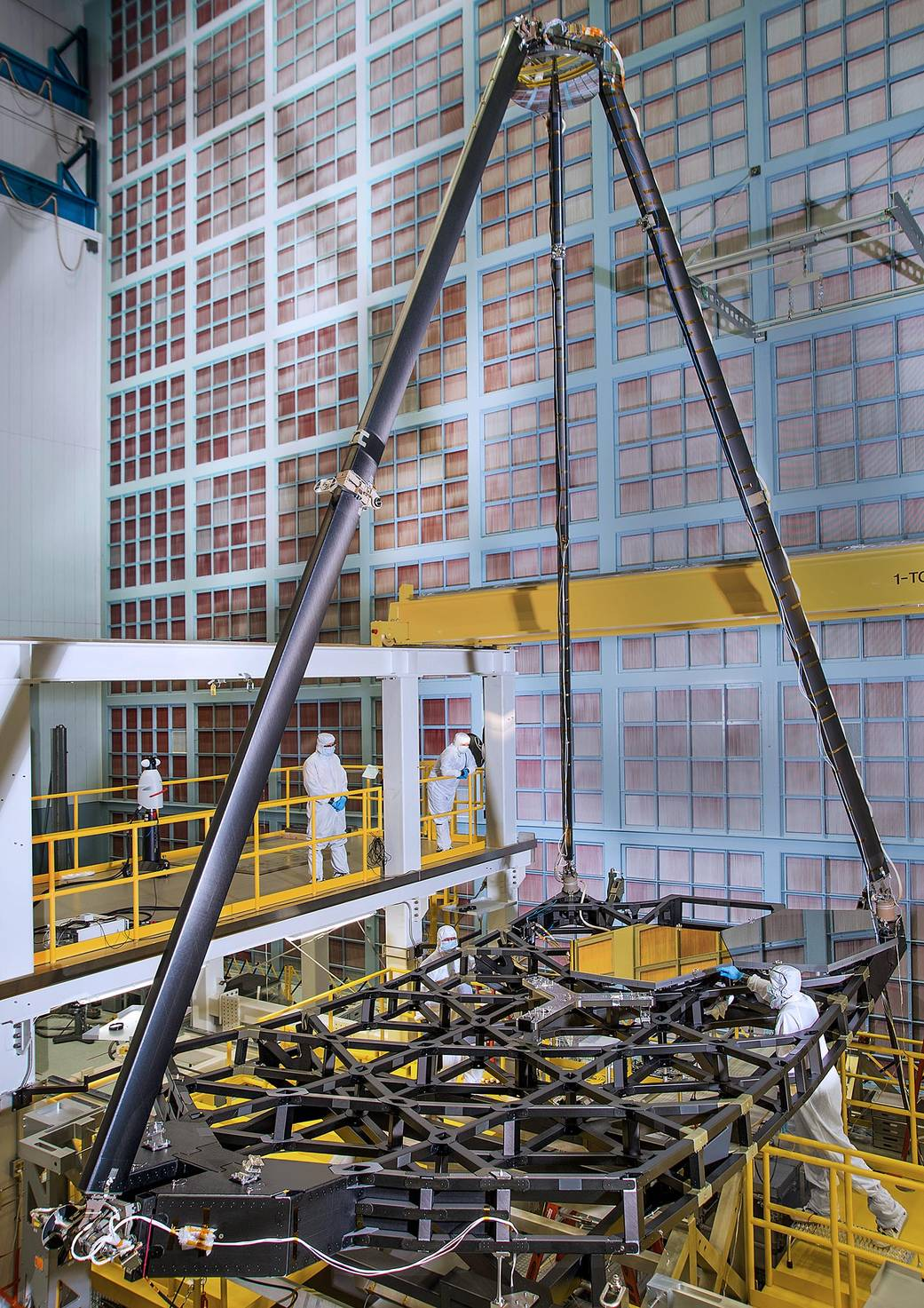
Pathfinder assembled in a clean room, 2014

In 2014 the pathfinder was transported from California to Maryland. In Maryland it was used for practicing mirror installation at Goddard Space Flight Center. It arrived at GSC in Maryland in July 2014. Mirror segments were installed on the Pathfinder, which allowed the procedure to be practiced.

At Goddard Spaceflight Center the two spare main mirror segments and a spare secondary mirror were installed on the pathfinder. The full James Webb Space Telescope main mirror has 18 segments (primary). It was considered to use silver, however gold is more durable than silver as a coating even though it is used for reflecting down to 400 nm wavelength light; JWST is primarily for 800 nm to 29000 nm.

The Pathfinder weighed about 1,400 kilograms (3,000 lb) after the mirrors were installed.

== Texas (Johnson Space Center) ==
After the work done in Maryland at Goddard, the pathfinder was taken to Johnson Space Center in Texas, for cold environment testing. The Pathfinder was delivered to JSC by early February 2015. In preparation for its arrival, in 2014 Optical Ground Support Equipment was installed at the cryogenic test chamber at Johnson Space Center. The ground support equipment was tested during the OGSE-1 in Chamber A at JSC, after which the Aft Optical Subsystem and Beam analyzer were installed and tested in OGSE-2. The first test was completed by June 2015, and the second test was completed by November 2015. The third major test, which involves even more modifications to pathfinder is called Thermal Pathfinder. During the optical tests the mirrors had to be "phased" or aligned to a distance less than the wavelength of light, thousands of times smaller than the thickness of a human hair at a temperature hundreds of degree below zero.

Practice makes perfect. Since we will be testing the world’s largest ever cryogenic telescope for the first time in the world’s largest cryogenic test chamber, we need to be experienced in using our test equipment so we can focus on the performance of the telescope

— Webb telescope Observatory Project Scientist

By the end of October 2015 the second round of testing with JWST was completed. The flight Aft Optics System was tested with the Pathfinder, and it was delivered for testing in May 2015. The Aft Optics System is part of the Optical Telescope Element in the flight telescope.

In 2016 the pathfinder was used for the Pathfinder Thermal Test at Johnson Space Center in Texas. At this time it had two spare flight-rated beryllium mirrors (one gold-coated) and ten non-flight gold-coated aluminum test segments functioning as thermal simulators. In 2016 the pathfinder underwent thermal and vacuum tests that the actual JWST was planned to also go through in 2017. The test chamber was originally built to test Apollo program hardware, but was refurbished for testing in the JWST program. The thermal test will take similar hardware on cool down time line, which allows heat flow to be studied. The flight JWST primary mirror is designed to be cooled down to 55 K (−218 °C; −361 °F) for operation, and the thermal tests on the pathfinder support this goal. The pathfinder had to be modified for the thermal tests, including the thermal simulators to stand in for the mirrors, but also insulation. There is also an Aft Optical Subsystem Geometry Simulator and an ISIM Electronics Compartment Simulator. The thermal test also demonstrates the Space Vehicle Thermal Simulator (SVTS) and the Deep Space Edge Radiation Sinks (DSERS).

== Components ==
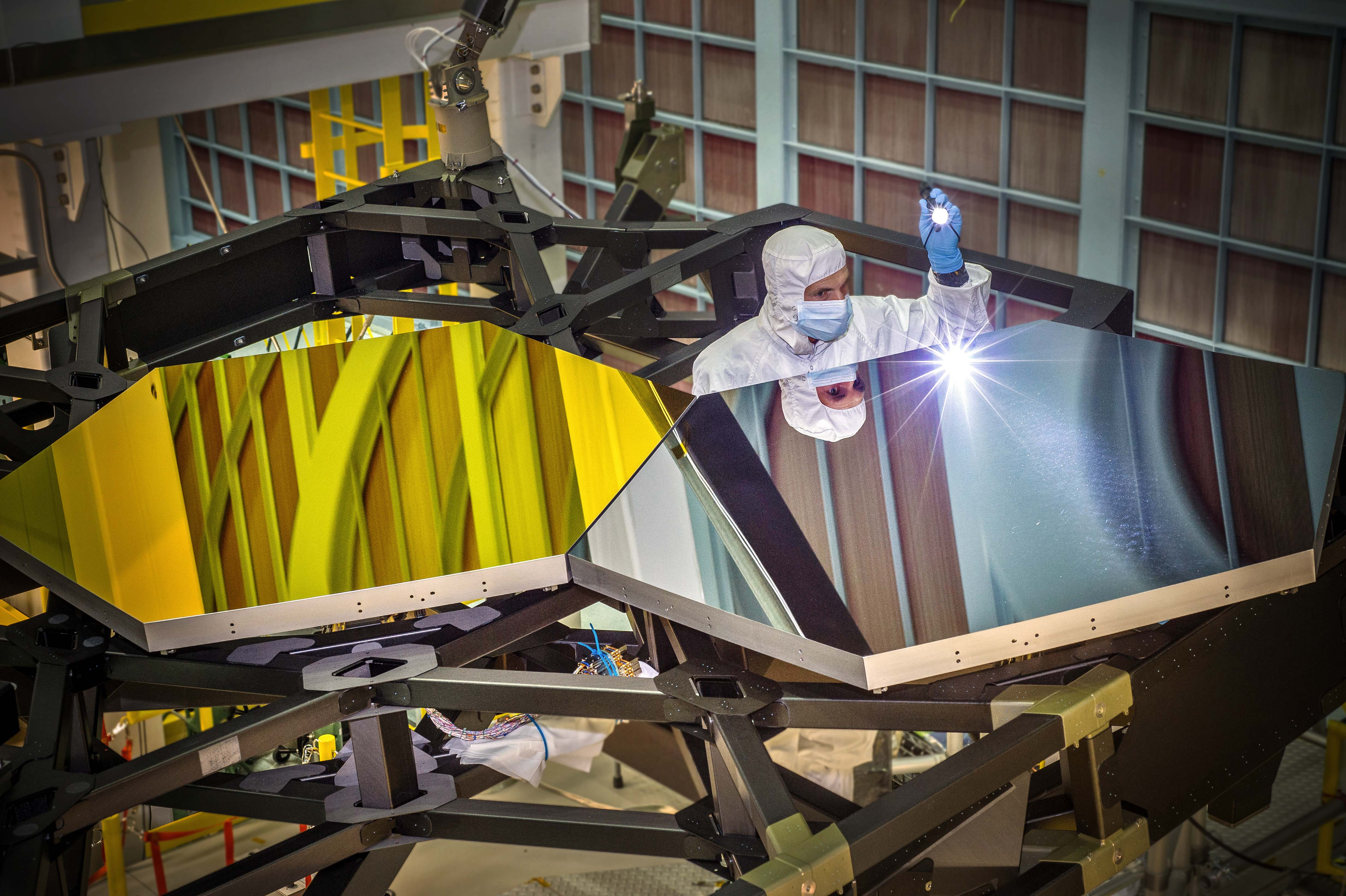
Two mirror segments of the testbed, one coated with gold one not.

As a test article the exact configuration has varied somewhat as it undergoes various tests.

Components have included:

- Test version of the backplane (full-size engineering model)
- Two spare beryllium mirror segments
- Spare secondary mirror
- Ten gold-coated aluminum thermal simulator segments

== See also ==
- Thermal radiation
- Thermal conductivity
