= Integrated Science Instrument Module =

Part of the James Webb Space Telescope

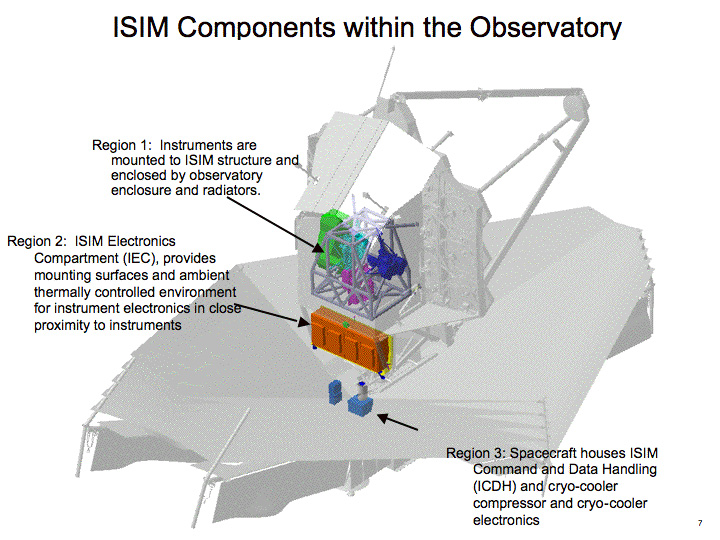
Diagram highlighting ISIM

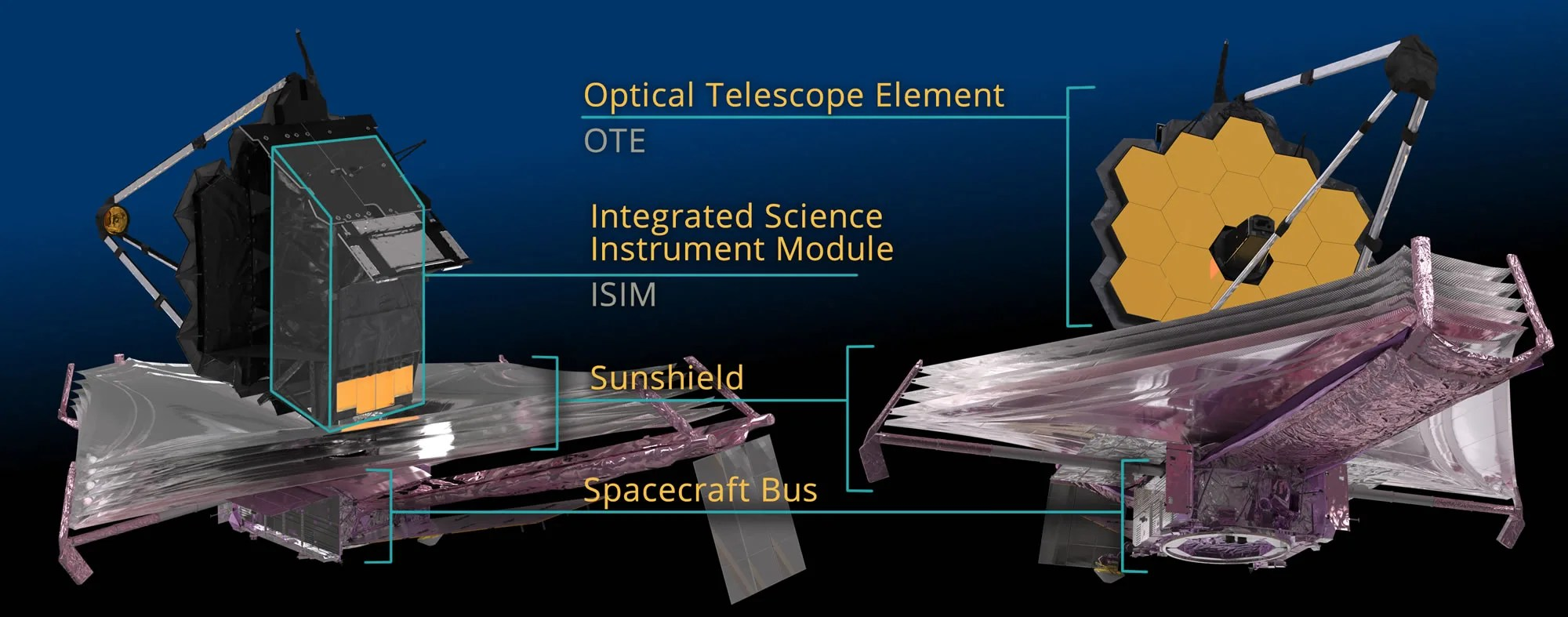
JWST major components: spacecraft bus, sunshield, Optical Telescope Element (OTE) and the Integrated Science Instrument Module (ISIM)

Integrated Science Instrument Module (ISIM) is a component of the James Webb Space Telescope, a large international infrared space telescope launched on 25 December 2021. ISIM is the heart of the JWST, and holds the main science payload which includes four science instruments and the fine guidance sensor.

ISIM is the spacecraft chassis and instruments that take the light from the main mirror and convert that into the science data that is then sent back to Earth. The other two major sections of the JWST are the Optical Telescope Element (OTE) (mirrors and their structure) and the Spacecraft Element (SE), which includes the spacecraft bus and sunshield. ISIM has a mass of 1400 kg (3086 lb), about 23% of the mass of the JWST.

The infrared camera instrument integrated with ISIM passed its thermal tests in early 2016. ISIM underwent intense thermal cold testing in late 2015 to early 2016. NIRcam is extremely important to JWST, because it is not only a sensitive infrared camera, but it is also used to adjust the alignment of the main mirror segments. The tests were very positive because NIRcam showed it was very stable through vibration and thermal testing. NIRcam was installed into ISIM in March 2014, and then underwent integration and testing after that, as the telescope was readied for its originally planned 2019 launch.

== Summary ==
ISIM test video by NASA

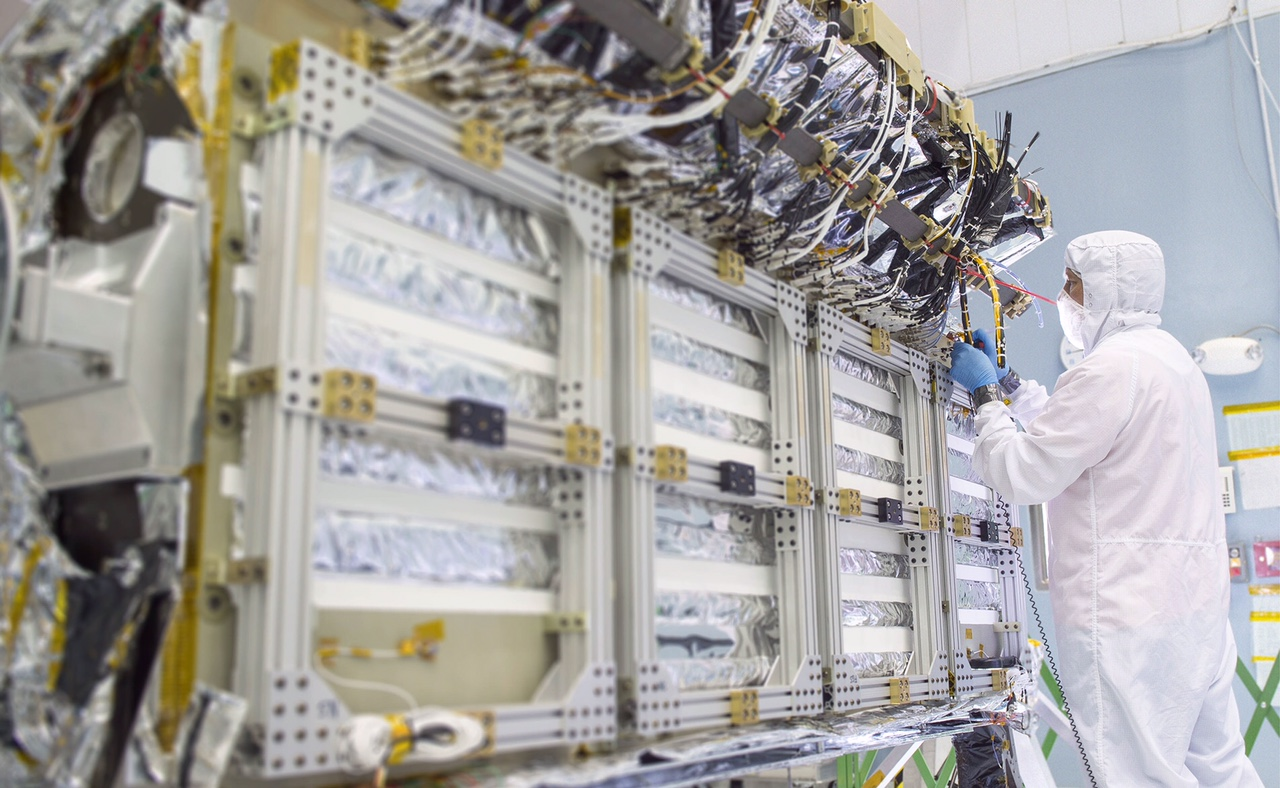
ISIM Electronics Compartment (IEC)

ISIM contains these instruments:

- Near-Infrared Camera, or NIRCam
- Near-Infrared Spectrograph, or NIRSpec.
- Mid-Infrared Instrument, or MIRI
- Fine Guidance Sensor/ Near InfraRed Imager and Slitless Spectrograph, or FGS/NIRISS

ISIM also includes the MIRI crycooler, which extends down into the spacecraft bus (on the hot side of the spacecraft). Relevant systems and subsystems of the ISIM:

- Optical metering structure
- ISIM Electronics Compartment (IEC)
- harness radiator
- ISIM Command and Data Handling System (ICDH)
- ISIM Remote Services Unit (IRSU)
- electrical harness system
- thermal control system
- flight software system
- on-board script system

Three regions to ISIM were defined by NASA to aid in its production. The three regions include the cryogenic instrument module (1), the electronics compartment (2), and finally the Command and Data Handling subsystem and MIRI crycooler (3), which is inside the spacecraft bus physically. MIRI needs to be colder than the other instruments so it has an additional cooler. MIRI is the mid-infrared instrument. The Command and Data Handling subsystem uses the spacecraft on-board communication standard called SpaceWire. SpaceWire was developed by the European Space Agency (ESA), and provides low-power data communication at up to 200 Mbits per second.

Regions:

- Cryogenic instrument module
- Electronics Compartment (ISIM Electronics Compartment (IEC))
- ISIM Command and Data Handling subsystem (ICDH)
  - This is located inside the spacecraft bus
  - Also includes MIRI cryocooler

In May 2016, OTE and ISIM were merged into what is called OTIS, which is the combination of these two regions.

=== ISIM Electronics Compartment (IEC) ===
The ISIM Electronics Compartment (IEC) is a section of ISIM that houses computing and electrical resources for the instruments. The main electronics for each of the instruments is housed in this thermally wrapped box. In 2014 the electronics for NIRspec were installed in the IEC. The IEC is mounted to the cryogenic structure of the main telescope, and the enclosure must maintain a much warmer temperature for the electronics inside, but not allow that heat to negatively affect the main telescope. The box can dissipate about 200 watts of electrical power. One of the considerations is to direct the majority of the heat (radiatively) in a roughly 20 degree angle in between the back of the main mirror structure and instruments and the sunshield. Not too close to the back of the telescope or too close to the sunshield, but by using baffles and insulation, direct the heat out into space. The IEC box sits just below most of the instruments and behind it, but above the spacecraft bus.

There is one side that is made of aluminum and the other sides are composite. It is wrapped in multiple layers of insulation including six layers of SLI (the JWST Single Layer Insulation). Some of the features for thermal (heat) management include a parasitic tray radiator and baffles.

IEC constitutes region 2 of ISIM.

== Gallery ==
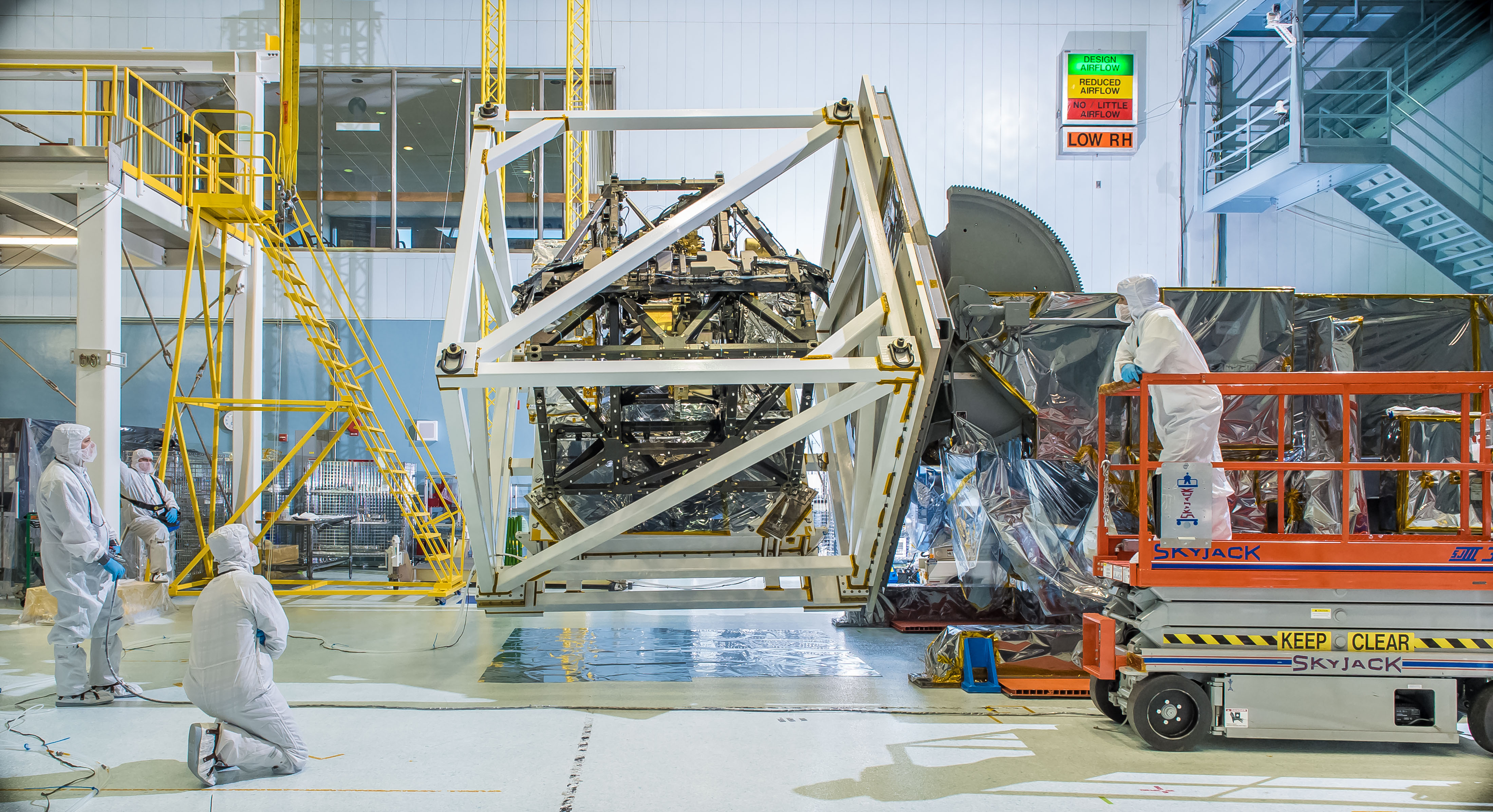
ISIM inside a cage for a gravity test, 2014

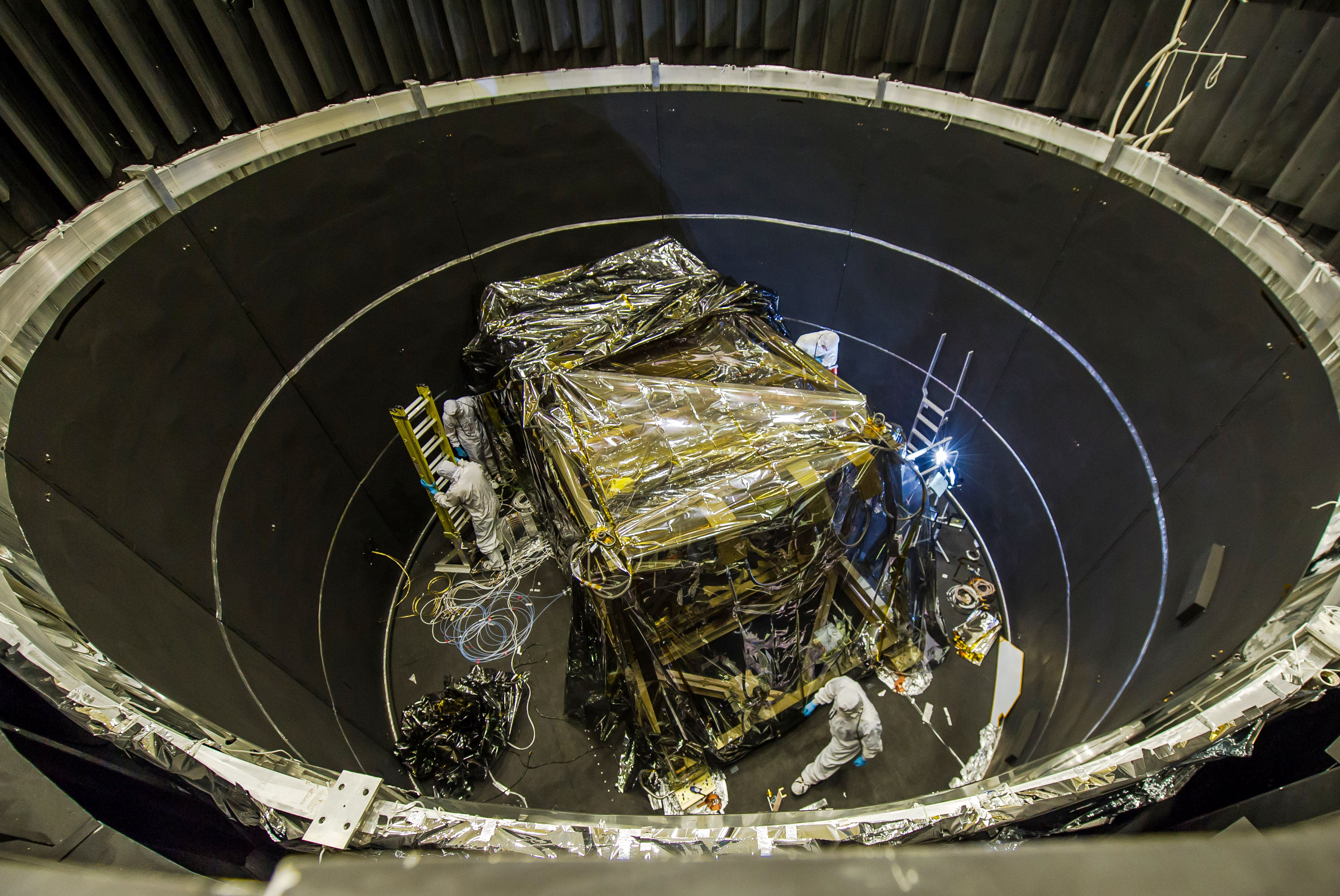
ISIM being prepared for a thermal vacuum test, 2013

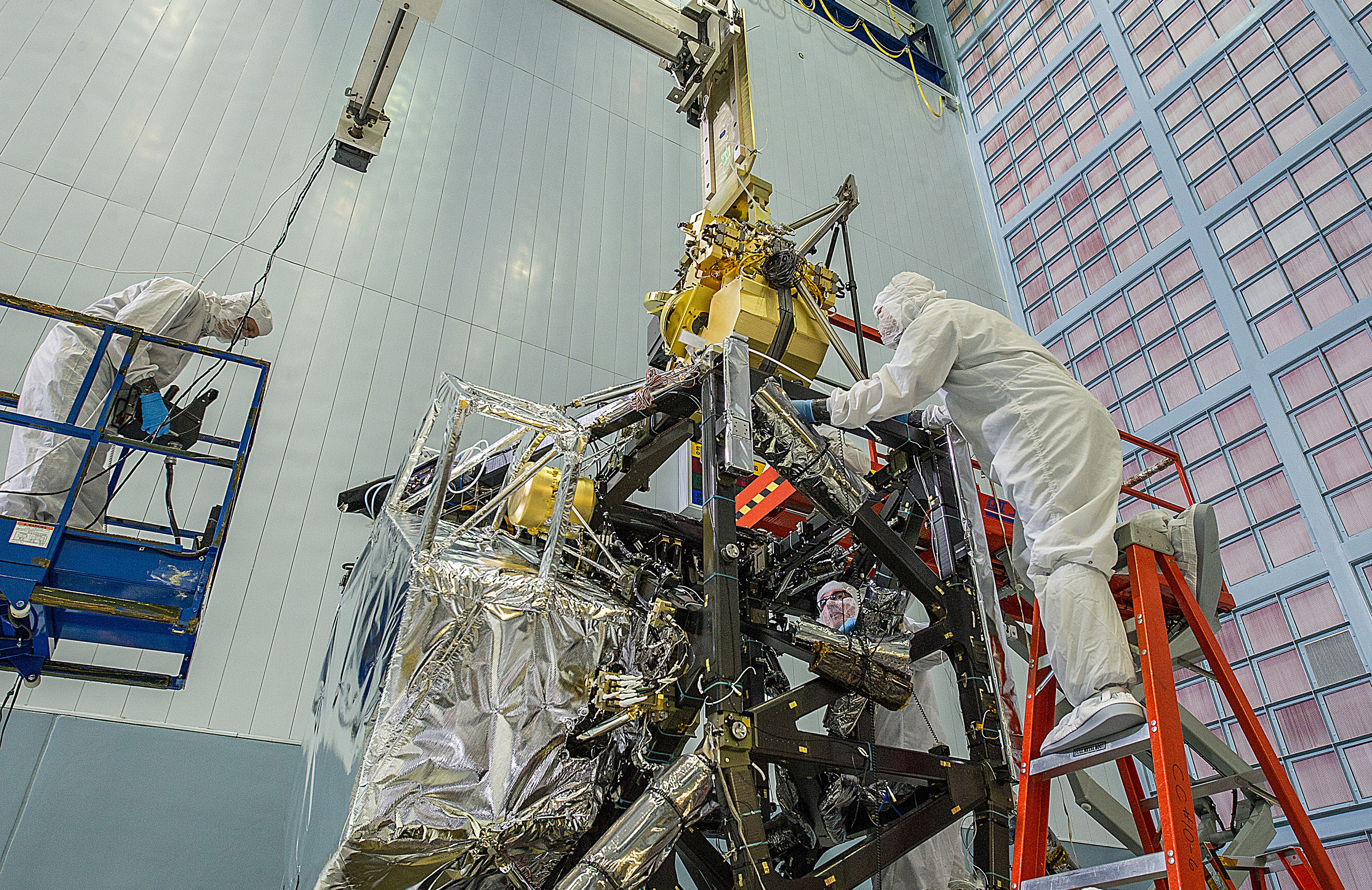
NIRcam being installed in ISIM, 2014

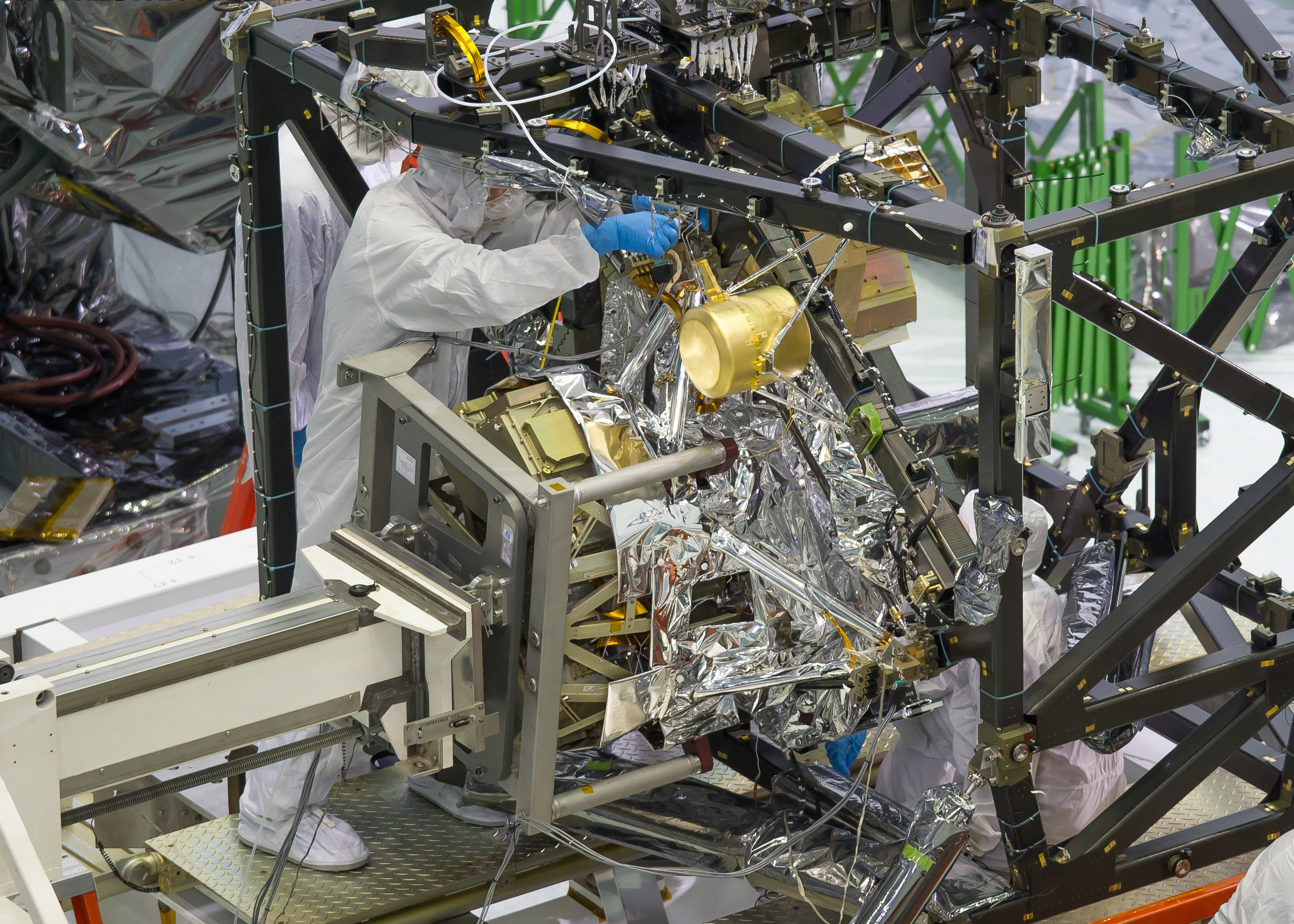
MIRI installed, 2013

== See also ==
- Optical Telescope Element (mirrors)
- Timeline of the James Webb Space Telescope
