= List of Netflix original films (2023) =

Netflix is an American global on-demand Internet streaming media provider, that has distributed a number of original programs, including original series, specials, miniseries, documentaries and films. Netflix's original films also include content that was first screened on cinematic release in other countries or given exclusive broadcast in other territories, and is then described as Netflix original content.

== Feature films ==
Title	Release date	Genre	Runtime	Language
The Pale Blue Eye	January 6, 2023	Historical thriller drama	2 h 10 min	English
Noise	January 11, 2023	Drama	1 h 45 min	Spanish
Dog Gone	January 13, 2023	Family drama	1 h 35 min	English
Disconnect: The Wedding Planner	January 13, 2023	Romantic comedy	1 h 47 min	English
Alkhallat+	January 19, 2023	Satirical thriller	1 h 57 min	Arabic
Jung E	January 20, 2023	Science fiction action / adventure	1 h 39 min	Korean
Mission Majnu	January 20, 2023	Spy thriller	2 h 9 min	Hindi
The Price of Family	January 25, 2023	Comedy	1 h 30 min	Italian
You People	January 27, 2023	Comedy	1 h 58 min	English
True Spirit	February 3, 2023	Biopic	1 h 49 min	English
Infiesto	February 3, 2023	Thriller	1 h 36 min	Spanish
Dear David	February 9, 2023	Coming-of-age romantic drama	1 h 58 min	Indonesian
Your Place or Mine	February 10, 2023	Romantic comedy	1 h 51 min	English
Squared Love All Over Again	February 13, 2023	Romantic comedy	1 h 40 min	Polish
All the Places	February 14, 2023	Comedy drama	1 h 37 min	Spanish
Unlocked	February 17, 2023	Thriller	1 h 57 min	Korean
The Strays	February 22, 2023	Drama	1 h 37 min	English
Call Me Chihiro	February 23, 2023	Drama	2 h 11 min	Japanese
We Have a Ghost	February 24, 2023	Family adventure	2 h 7 min	English
Tonight You're Sleeping with Me	March 1, 2023	Romantic drama	1 h 33 min	Polish
10 Days of a Good Man	March 3, 2023	Drama	2 h 4 min	Turkish
Love at First Kiss	March 3, 2023	Romantic comedy	1 h 36 min	Spanish
Faraway	March 8, 2023	Romantic comedy	1 h 49 min	English
Have a Nice Day!	March 10, 2023	Comedy	1 h 33 min	Spanish
Luther: The Fallen Sun	March 10, 2023	Crime drama	2 h 10 min	English
In His Shadow	March 17, 2023	Drama	1 h 29 min	French
Noise	March 17, 2023	Thriller	1 h 30 min	Dutch
The Magician's Elephant	March 17, 2023	CGI animation fantasy adventure	1 h 43 min	English
Chor Nikal Ke Bhaga	March 24, 2023	Heist thriller	1 h 50 min	Hindi
Kill Boksoon	March 31, 2023	Crime thriller	2 h 19 min	Korean
Murder Mystery 2	March 31, 2023	Mystery comedy	1 h 30 min	English
Chupa	April 7, 2023	Fantasy adventure	1 h 38 min	English
Kings of Mulberry Street: Let Love Reign	April 7, 2023	Comedy	1 h 49 min	English
Oh Belinda	April 7, 2023	Drama	1 h 37 min	Turkish
Hunger	April 8, 2023	Thriller drama	2 h 10 min	Thai
Queens on the Run	April 14, 2023	Comedy	1 h 37 min	Spanish
Phenomena	April 14, 2023	Comedy	1 h 34 min	Spanish
A Tourist's Guide to Love	April 21, 2023	Romantic comedy	1 h 36 min	English
Chokehold	April 21, 2023	Thriller	1 h 52 min	Turkish
One More Time	April 21, 2023	Comedy	1 h 25 min	Swedish
Kiss, Kiss!	April 26, 2023	Romantic comedy	1 h 47 min	Polish
The Matchmaker	April 27, 2023	Psychological thriller	1 h 21 min	Arabic
AKA	April 28, 2023	Action thriller	2 h 4 min	French
Royalteen: Princess Margrethe	May 11, 2023	Coming-of-age	1 h 38 min	Norwegian
The Mother	May 12, 2023	Action drama	1 h 57 min	English
Fanfic	May 17, 2023	Drama	1 h 35 min	Polish
Kathal – A Jackfruit Mystery	May 19, 2023	Dark crime dramedy	1 h 55 min	Hindi
Hard Feelings	May 24, 2023	Comedy	1 h 43 min	German
Mother's Day	May 24, 2023	Action	1 h 34 min	Polish
Blood and Gold	May 26, 2023	War	1 h 40 min	German
Where the Tracks End	May 26, 2023	Family film	1 h 35 min	Spanish
A Beautiful Life	June 1, 2023	Drama	1 h 39 min	Danish
Missed Connections	June 2, 2023	Romantic comedy	1 h 47 min	Filipino
Rich in Love 2	June 2, 2023	Romantic comedy	1 h 29 min	Portuguese
The Wonder Weeks	June 9, 2023	Comedy drama	1 h 50 min	Dutch
You Do You	June 9, 2023	Romantic comedy	1 h 39 min	Turkish
Black Clover: Sword of the Wizard King	June 16, 2023	Anime	1 h 53 min	Japanese
Extraction 2	June 16, 2023	Action thriller	2 h 3 min	English
iNumber Number: Jozi Gold	June 23, 2023	Thriller	1 h 53 min	English
Make Me Believe	June 23, 2023	Romantic comedy	1 h 44 min	Turkish
The Perfect Find	June 23, 2023	Romantic comedy	1 h 39 min	English
Through My Window 2: Across the Sea	June 23, 2023	Romance	1 h 51 min	Spanish
Lust Stories 2	June 29, 2023	Anthology film	2 h 12 min	Hindi
Nimona	June 30, 2023	CGI animated science fiction	1 h 42 min	English
Gold Brick	July 6, 2023	Comedy	1 h 35 min	French
Seasons	July 7, 2023	Romance	1 h 49 min	Filipino
The Out-Laws	July 7, 2023	Action comedy	1 h 35 min	English
Mr. Car and the Knights Templar	July 12, 2023	Drama	1 h 50 min	Polish
Bird Box Barcelona	July 14, 2023	Post-apocalyptic horror-thriller	1 h 51 min	Spanish
Love Tactics 2	July 14, 2023	Romantic comedy	1 h 38 min	Turkish
The (Almost) Legends	July 19, 2023	Comedy	1 h 36 min	Spanish
They Cloned Tyrone	July 21, 2023	Science fiction comedy mystery	1 h 59 min	English
Happiness for Beginners	July 27, 2023	Romantic comedy	1 h 43 min	English
Paradise	July 27, 2023	Science fiction action-thriller	1 h 58 min	German
The Murderer	July 27, 2023	Black comedy	2 h	Thai
Today We'll Talk About That Day	July 27, 2023	Melodrama	1 h 58 min	Indonesian
Big Nunu's Little Heist	July 28, 2023	Comedy	1 h 32 min	Zulu
Soulcatcher	August 2, 2023	Thriller	1 h 38 min	Polish
Head to Head	August 3, 2023	Thriller comedy	1 h 34 min	Arabic
Zom 100: Bucket List of the Dead	August 3, 2023	Zombie apocalypse / comedy	2 h 9 min	Japanese
Heart of Stone	August 11, 2023	Spy thriller	2 h 5 min	English
10 Days of a Bad Man	August 18, 2023	Drama	2 h 4 min	Turkish
Love, Sex & 30 Candles	August 18, 2023	Drama	1 h 46 min	English
The Monkey King	August 18, 2023	CGI animation action comedy	1 h 36 min	English
Squared Love Everlasting	August 23, 2023	Romantic comedy	1 h 42 min	Polish
Killer Book Club	August 25, 2023	Slasher	1 h 29 min	Spanish
You Are So Not Invited to My Bat Mitzvah	August 25, 2023	Coming-of-age	1 h 43 min	English
The Great Seduction	August 30, 2023	Comedy	1 h 35 min	Spanish
A Day and a Half	September 1, 2023	Thriller	1 h 35 min	Swedish
Friday Night Plan	September 1, 2023	Coming-of-age	1 h 48 min	Hindi
Happy Ending	September 1, 2023	Comedy	1 h 33 min	Dutch
What If?	September 7, 2023	Romantic drama	1 h 52 min	Filipino
Freestyle	September 13, 2023	Thriller	1 h 28 min	Polish
Ehrengard: The Art of Seduction	September 14, 2023	Romantic comedy	1 h 34 min	Danish
Once Upon a Crime	September 19, 2023	Fantasy	1 h 47 min	Japanese
El Conde	September 15, 2023	Black comedy	1 h 51 min	Spanish
Love at First Sight	September 15, 2023	Romance	1 h 31 min	English
Jaane Jaan	September 21, 2023	Thriller	2 h 19 min	Hindi
Spy Kids: Armageddon	September 22, 2023	Action-adventure	1 h 37 min	English
The Black Book	September 22, 2023	Thriller	2 h 4 min	English
Forgotten Love	September 27, 2023	Drama	2 h 20 min	Polish
Overhaul	September 27, 2023	Action drama	1 h 38 min	Portuguese
Street Flow 2	September 27, 2023	Drama	1 h 38 min	French
Love Is in the Air	September 28, 2023	Romantic comedy	1 h 28 min	English
Do Not Disturb	September 29, 2023	Dramedy	1 h 54 min	Turkish
Nowhere	September 29, 2023	Thriller	1 h 49 min	Spanish
Reptile	September 29, 2023	Crime drama	2 h 16 min	English
Keys to the Heart	October 4, 2023	Drama	1 h 42 min	Filipino
Khufiya	October 5, 2023	Spy thriller	2 h 37 min	Hindi
Fair Play	October 6, 2023	Erotic thriller	1 h 55 min	English
A Deadly Invitation	October 6, 2023	Drama	1 h 33 min	Spanish
Ballerina	October 6, 2023	Thriller	1 h 33 min	Korean
Once Upon a Star	October 11, 2023	Drama	2 h 18 min	Thai
Ijogbon	October 13, 2023	Drama	1 h 55 min	Yoruba
The Conference	October 13, 2023	Slasher comedy	1 h 40 min	Swedish
Crypto Boy	October 19, 2023	Drama	1 h 43 min	Dutch
Kandasamys: The Baby	October 20, 2023	Comedy	1 h 33 min	English
Old Dads	October 20, 2023	Comedy	1 h 44 min	English
Burning Betrayal	October 25, 2023	Thriller	1 h 38 min	Portuguese
Pain Hustlers	October 27, 2023	Crime drama	2 h 4 min	English
Sister Death	October 27, 2023	Horror	1 h 30 min	Spanish
Hurricane Season	November 1, 2023	Drama	1 h 39 min	Spanish
Locked In	November 1, 2023	Psychological thriller	1 h 36 min	English
Nuovo Olimpo	November 1, 2023	Romance	1 h 52 min	Italian
Wingwomen	November 1, 2023	Action dramedy	1 h 55 min	French
Nyad	November 3, 2023	Biopic	2 h 1 min	English
The Killer	November 10, 2023	Neo-noir action thriller	1 h 59 min	English
Best. Christmas. Ever!	November 16, 2023	Romantic comedy	1 h 21 min	English
In Love and Deep Water	November 16, 2023	Romantic mystery comedy	2 h 7 min	Japanese
Believer 2	November 17, 2023	Crime action	1 h 56 min	Korean
Rustin	November 17, 2023	Biographical drama	1 h 48 min	English
All-Time High	November 17, 2023	Comedy	1 h 43 min	French
The Queenstown Kings	November 17, 2023	Drama	2 h 17 min	Xhosa
Leo	November 21, 2023	CGI animation musical	1 h 46 min	English
I Don't Expect Anyone to Believe Me	November 22, 2023	Comedy-thriller	1 h 57 min	Spanish
Doi Boy	November 24, 2023	Drama	1 h 39 min	Thai
Elena Knows	November 24, 2023	Drama	1 h 40 min	Spanish
Last Call for Istanbul	November 24, 2023	Drama	1 h 31 min	Turkish
Wedding Games	November 24, 2023	Comedy	1 h 19 min	Portuguese
Family Switch	November 30, 2023	Comedy	1 h 45 min	English
Christmas as Usual	December 6, 2023	Romantic comedy	1 h 29 min	Norwegian
NAGA	December 7, 2023	Thriller	1 h 53 min	Arabic
The Archies	December 7, 2023	Musical	2 h 23 min	Hindi
Blood Vessel	December 8, 2023	Thriller	1 h 59 min	Ijaw
Leave the World Behind	December 8, 2023	Drama	2 h 21 min	English
Chicken Run: Dawn of the Nugget	December 15, 2023	Stop motion action comedy	1 h 41 min	English
Familia	December 15, 2023	Drama	1 h 45 min	Spanish
Maestro	December 20, 2023	Biographical drama	2 h 11 min	English
The Taming of the Shrewd 2	December 20, 2023	Comedy	1 h 40 min	Polish
Rebel Moon – Part One: A Child of Fire	December 21, 2023	Space opera	2 h 15 min	English
A Vampire in the Family	December 24, 2023	Comedy	1 h 29 min	Portuguese
Kho Gaye Hum Kahan	December 26, 2023	Comedy drama	2 h 14 min	Hindi
Thank You, I'm Sorry	December 26, 2023	Comedy drama	1 h 31 min	Swedish

== Documentaries ==
Title	Release date	Runtime	Language
Mumbai Mafia: Police vs the Underworld	January 6, 2023	1 h 27 min	English
The Hatchet Wielding Hitchhiker	January 10, 2023	1 h 25 min	English
Big Mäck: Gangsters and Gold	January 20, 2023	1 h 30 min	German
Pamela, a Love Story	January 31, 2023	1 h 52 min	English
Money Shot: The Pornhub Story	March 15, 2023	1 h 34 min	English
Caught Out: Crime. Corruption. Cricket	March 17, 2023	1 h 17 min	English
Lewis Capaldi: How I'm Feeling Now	April 5, 2023	1 h 36 min	English
Longest Third Date	April 18, 2023	1 h 15 min	English
Anna Nicole Smith: You Don't Know Me	May 16, 2023	1 h 56 min	English
Victim/Suspect	May 23, 2023	1 h 35 min	English
Take Care of Maya	June 19, 2023	1 h 43 min	English
King of Clones	June 23, 2023	1 h 25 min	English
Eldorado: Everything the Nazis Hate	June 28, 2023	1 h 32 min	English
Unknown: The Lost Pyramid	July 3, 2023	1 h 24 min	English
Wham!	July 5, 2023	1 h 32 min	English
Unknown: Killer Robots	July 10, 2023	1 h 8 min	English
Unknown: Cave of Bones	July 17, 2023	1 h 34 min	English
The Deepest Breath	July 19, 2023	1 h 50 min	English
Unknown: Cosmic Time Machine	July 24, 2023	1 h 4 min	English
Missing: The Lucie Blackman Case (Note: The documentary is titled Tokyo Crime Squad: The Lucie Blackman Case in Japan.)	July 26, 2023	1 h 22 min	English
Tokyo Crime Squad: The Lucie Blackman Case (Note: The documentary is titled Missing: The Lucie Blackman Case outside Japan.)	July 26, 2023	1 h 41 min	Japanese
The Lady of Silence: The Mataviejitas Murders	July 27, 2023	1 h 51 min	Spanish
Untold: Jake Paul the Problem Child	August 1, 2023	1 h 12 min	English
Mark Cavendish: Never Enough	August 2, 2023	1 h 32 min	English
Poisoned: The Dirty Truth About Your Food	August 2, 2023	1 h 22 min	English
Untold: Johnny Football	August 8, 2023	1 h 12 min	English
Untold: Hall of Shame	August 15, 2023	1 h 18 min	English
A Life Too Short: The Isabella Nardoni Case	August 17, 2023	1 h 44 min	Portuguese
Scouts Honor: The Secret Files of the Boy Scouts of America	September 6, 2023	1 h 34 min	English
Rosa Peral's Tapes	September 8, 2023	1 h 20 min	Spanish
The Saint of Second Chances	September 19, 2023	1 h 34 min	English
Ice Cold: Murder, Coffee and Jessica Wongso	September 28, 2023	1 h 26 min	Indonesian
The Darkness within La Luz del Mundo	September 28, 2023	1 h 54 min	Spanish
Race to the Summit	October 4, 2023	1 h 30 min	German
Camp Courage	October 15, 2023	33 min	Ukrainian
The Devil on Trial	October 17, 2023	1 h 21 min	English
Vjeran Tomic: The Spider-Man of Paris	October 20, 2023	1 h 26 min	French
Onefour: Against All Odds	October 26, 2023	1 h 22 min	English
Yellow Door: '90s Lo-fi Film Club	October 27, 2023	1 h 24 min	Korean
Higuita: The Way of the Scorpion	November 2, 2023	1 h 30 min	Spanish
Sly	November 3, 2023	1 h 36 min	English
Cyberbunker: The Criminal Underworld	November 8, 2023	1 h 41 min	English
Stamped from the Beginning	November 20, 2023	1 h 32 min	English
Ilary Blasi: The One and Only	November 24, 2023	1 h 20 min	Italian
American Symphony	November 29, 2023	1 h 43 min	English
Kevin Hart & Chris Rock: Headliners Only	December 12, 2023	1 h 22 min	English
Face to Face with ETA: Conversations with a Terrorist	December 15, 2023	1 h 42 min	Spanish
Curry & Cyanide: The Jolly Joseph Case	December 22, 2023	1 h 35 min	Malayalam
Hell Camp: Teen Nightmare	December 27, 2023	1 h 30 min	English

== Specials ==
These programs are one-time original events or supplementary content related to original films.

Title	Release date	Genre	Runtime	Language
A Whole Lifetime with Jamie Demetriou	February 28, 2023	Comedy	52 min	English
We Lost Our Human	March 21, 2023	Animation / interactive fiction	1 h 43 min	English
Mighty Morphin Power Rangers: Once & Always	April 19, 2023	Superhero science fiction	55 min	English
The Light We Carry: Michelle Obama & Oprah Winfrey	April 25, 2023	Interview	1 h 30 min	English
Tudum 2023: A Global Fan Event	June 17, 2023	Fan event	2 h 46 min	English
The Seven Deadly Sins: Grudge of Edinburgh Part 2	August 8, 2023	Anime	54 min	Japanese
Choose Love	August 31, 2023	Romantic comedy / interactive fiction	1 h 17 min	English
Lifting the Veil: Behind the Scenes of Ehrengard	September 14, 2023	Behind the scenes	40 min	Danish
The Wonderful Story of Henry Sugar	September 27, 2023	Adventure comedy	39 min	English
The Netflix Cup	November 14, 2023	Sports event	2 h 35 min	English

== Shorts ==
These are programs that have a runtime of less than 20 minutes.

Title	Release date	Genre	Runtime	Language
Making All Quiet on the Western Front	February 20, 2023	Making of	18 min	German
Weathering	April 14, 2023	Thriller	20 min	English
The Swan	September 28, 2023	Comedy	17 min	English
The Rat Catcher	September 29, 2023	Comedy	17 min	English
Poison	September 30, 2023	Comedy	17 min	English
Flashback	October 20, 2023	Horror	16 min	English
Disco Inferno	October 20, 2023	Horror	18 min	English
The After	October 25, 2023	Drama	18 min	English
Temple of Film: 100 Years of the Egyptian Theatre	November 9, 2023	Documentary	11 min	English
The Dads	November 17, 2023	Documentary	11 min	English
Making of Chicken Run: Dawn of the Nugget	December 15, 2023	Making of	19 min	English
