= Scarlin Hernandez =

Dominican-American space engineer

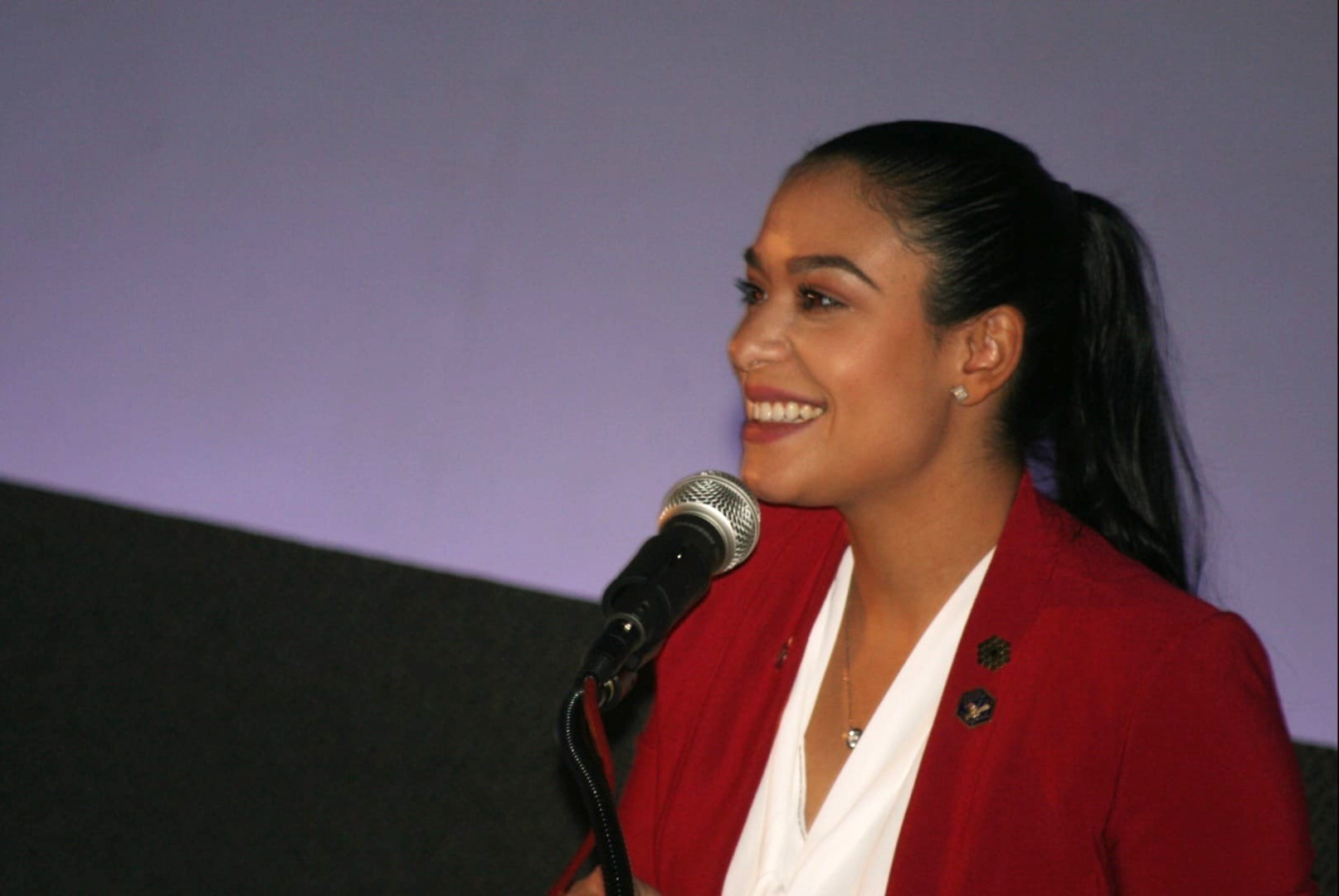
- Hernandez in 2025
- Born: 1991 (age 34–35); Dominican Republic
- Education: Capitol Technology University

Scarlin Hernandez (born 1991) is a Dominican-American astronautical engineer and empowerment speaker. She worked as a spacecraft engineer for NASA’s James Webb Space Telescope at the Space Telescope Science Institute in Baltimore, MD. Testing the ground systems that will direct and control the telescope once it has been launched into space is a crucial aspect of her job as a spacecraft engineer.

== Early life and education ==
Hernandez was born in the Dominican Republic and moved to Brooklyn, New York, at the age of four. She didn't know English prior to moving to Brooklyn, and she was raised in poverty. She grew up in Baltimore, MD, and attended high school at Baltimore Polytechnic Institute.

In 2013, she earned a degree in computer engineering from Capitol Technology University in Laurel, Maryland, supported by a full scholarship from the National Science Foundation. She also began to pursue astronautical engineering in her studies while at Capitol. She was the first person in her family to graduate college. She also started a chapter of the Society of Women Engineers and served as secretary and later president.

While in college, she completed an internship at the NASA Goddard Space Flight Center, where she was part of the ground control system team for the Tropical Rainfall Measuring Mission satellite, which operated from 1997-2015. She also helped start a Society for Women Engineers chapter at her college and progressed to the President position her senior year.

== Career ==
Following college, Hernandez worked in various roles for the Tropical Rainfall Measuring Mission, including as mission planning lead, systems engineer, propulsion engineer, and power engineer. From there, she moved to focus on deep space, joining the James Webb Space Telescope mission at the Space Telescope Science Institute. This telescope was created to make breakthroughs in new planet and old star discoveries. She worked on the flight operations team on the deployment control subsystem. In 2017, Scarlin Hernandez was recognized by the online magazine Remezcla as one of "10 Latinas making their mark on STEM," highlighting her impact as a woman engineer from a minority background in a field striving for diversity.

She supported the Webb telescope during its December 25, 2021 launch, and worked on its console throughout its commissioning. She also worked on its Optical Telescope Element.

While at the Space Telescope Science Institute, she participated in internal projects such as the Women Empowering Women program, the first institute-wide diversity, equity, and inclusion program, as well as recruitment campaigns with the Society of Women Engineers and Capitol Technology University.

In 2022, Hernandez was the National Award of the Youth in the Dominican Republic, and the same year she was also included in Forbes Dominican Republic Las 50 Mujeres Poderosas República Dominicana.

Hernandez has been featured in the documentary Orgullo de Quisqueya and the Netflix documentary Unknown: Cosmic Time Machine.

== Personal Life ==
Hernandez is a Spiritual Life Coach with certification from the Dharma Coaching Institute. She gained Reiki Mastery in Levels I-III. Hernandez also performs spiritual teachings, 1:1 sessions, and energy teaching clinics. She identifies as a wellness advocate.
