= VA256 =

VA256 may refer to:

- Ariane flight VA256, the Ariane 5 launch of the James Webb Space Telescope
- Virgin Australia flight 256, with IATA flight number VA256
- Virginia State Route 256 (SR 256 or VA-256), a primary state highway in the United States
