= Seasons (2023 film) =

- Directed by: Easy Ferrer
- Written by: Dwein Baltazar; Lovi Poe
- Produced by: Regal Films
- Starring: Lovi Poe; Carlo Aquino
- Distributed by: Netflix
- Release date: 7 July 2023 (Netflix)
- Running time: 108 minutes
- Country: Philippines
- Language: Filipino

Seasons is a 2023 Filipino romantic drama film directed by Easy Ferrer and co-written by Dwein Baltazar and Lovi Poe. It stars Poe and Carlo Aquino as best friends who agree to help each other find new relationships, only to confront their feelings for one another. The film was produced by Regal Films in partnership with Netflix and was released worldwide on Netflix on July 7, 2023.

== Plot ==
Charlie and Kurt have been inseparable best friends since high school, supporting each other through a series of failed relationships. Frustrated by their bad luck in love, they make a pact to help each other find new partners—Charlie must date someone from work, while Kurt turns to online dating. As they pursue new romances, they begin to realize they may have been overlooking the person right in front of them all along.

== Cast ==
- Lovi Poe as Charlie
- Carlo Aquino as Kurt
- Sarah Edwards in a supporting role

== Release ==
The film was released globally on Netflix on July 7, 2023. It was promoted through Netflix Philippines' social media channels and official trailers, highlighting its "friends-to-lovers" premise and the star pairing of Poe and Aquino. Seasons appeared in Netflix’s global Top 10 for films in non-English languages for three consecutive weeks, reflecting strong international viewership.

== Reception ==
Critics praised the chemistry between the leads, with one review noting that “the portrayal of emotion is fantastically delivered” in emotional scenes. Decider commented that Poe “holds the film together as she careens from delightful to deplorable.” Another review described the film as a “generic friends-to-lovers rom-com.” Meanwhile, Inquirer Lifestyle described Poe’s performance as “dazzles in her performance in ‘Seasons.’”

== Themes ==
The film explores themes of long-term friendship evolving into romance, the emotional risk of redefining a close bond, and the challenges of dating in one’s 30s. It emphasizes emotional honesty and the idea that love can be found in unexpected places.

== See also ==
- Philippine cinema
- List of Netflix original films (2023)
