= Launch and commissioning of the James Webb Space Telescope =

Beginnings of the infrared astronomical observatory

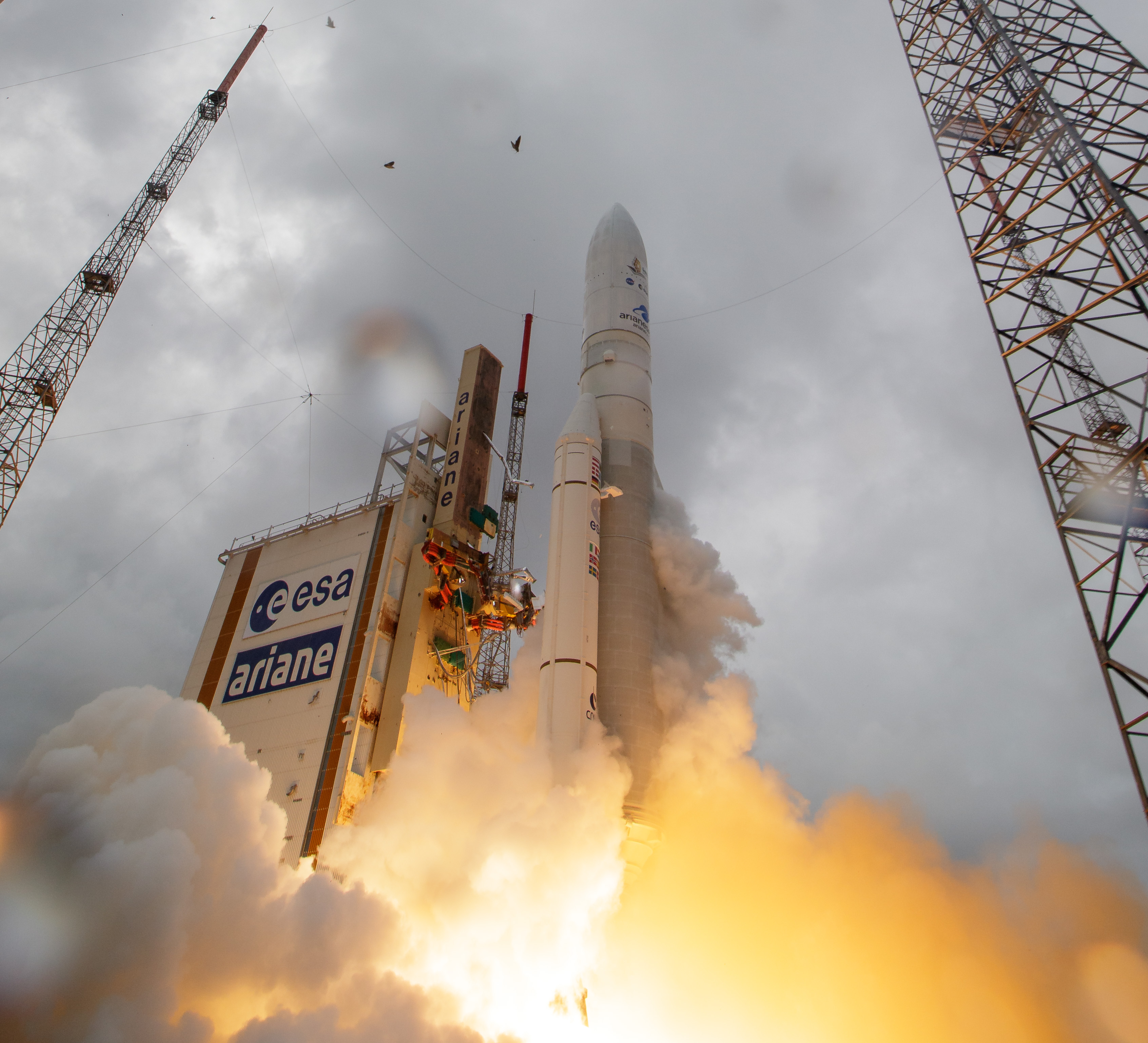
Ariane flight VA256 launching containing the James Webb Space Telescope

The James Webb Space Telescope (JWST) is a space telescope designed primarily to conduct infrared astronomy. Its complex launch and commissioning process lasted from late 2021 until mid-2022.

The U.S. National Aeronautics and Space Administration (NASA) led JWST's development in collaboration with the European Space Agency (ESA) and the Canadian Space Agency (CSA), beginning in the late 1990s. The NASA Goddard Space Flight Center (GSFC) in Maryland managed telescope development, the Space Telescope Science Institute in Baltimore on the Homewood Campus of Johns Hopkins University operates JWST, and the prime contractor was Northrop Grumman. The telescope is named after James E. Webb, who was the administrator of NASA from 1961 to 1968 during the Mercury, Gemini, and Apollo programs.

The launch (designated Ariane flight VA256) took place as scheduled at 12:20 UTC on 25 December 2021 on an Ariane 5 rocket that lifted off from the Guiana Space Centre in French Guiana. Upon successful launch, NASA administrator Bill Nelson called it "a great day for planet Earth". The telescope was confirmed to be receiving power, starting a two-week deployment phase of its parts and traveling to its target destination. A six-month commissioning phase followed of testing and calibrating scientific instruments, culminating in the first scientific results being publicly shared in July 2022. The telescope's nominal mission time is five years, with a goal of ten years. An L_{2} orbit is unstable, so JWST needs to use propellant to maintain its halo orbit around L_{2} (known as station-keeping) to prevent the telescope from drifting away from its orbital position. It was designed to carry enough propellant for 10 years, but the precision of the Ariane 5 launch and the first midcourse correction were credited with saving enough onboard fuel that JWST may be able to maintain its orbit for around 20 years instead. Space.com called the launch "flawless".

== Launch ==
=== Rocket preparation ===
Ariane 5 is a heavy lift two-stage rocket with two solid fuel boosters. It was used in its ECA variant, which offers the highest payload mass capacity. The total launch mass of the vehicle is of the order of 770,000 kg (1,700,000 lb). Spacecraft fuelling operations began on 25 November 2021, the fuelling system was disconnected on 3 December 2021, and verifications were concluded on 5 December 2021. The telescope's fuel system was filled with approximately 168 kg (370 lb) of hydrazine and 133 kg (293 lb) of dinitrogen tetroxide, needed to reach and maintain its orbit after separation from the launch vehicle. Following the rocket, which had already arrived on 29 November 2021, the telescope was moved to the final assembly building (Bâtiment d’Assemblage Final or BAF) on 7 December 2021. The payload was encapsulated inside the fairing on top of the rocket on 21 December 2021.

Scientists and engineers who worked on the project described their feelings of anticipation and anxiety about the launch of the exhaustively tested nearly $10 billion instrument, commenting that it would be "an exciting moment" and they would feel "terrified the entire time".

=== Liftoff ===
The launch (designated Ariane flight VA256) took place as scheduled at 12:20 UTC on 25 December 2021 on an Ariane 5 rocket that lifted off from the Guiana Space Centre in French Guiana. Upon successful launch, NASA administrator Bill Nelson called it "a great day for planet Earth". The telescope was confirmed to be receiving power, starting a two-week deployment phase of its parts and traveling to its target destination. The observatory was attached to the Ariane 5 via a launch vehicle adapter ring which could be used by a future spacecraft to grapple the observatory to attempt to fix gross deployment problems. However, the telescope itself is not serviceable, and astronauts would not be able to perform tasks such as swapping instruments, as with the Hubble Telescope. The telescope was released from the upper stage 27 minutes 7 seconds after launch, beginning a 30-day adjustment to place the telescope in a Lissajous orbit around the L_{2} Lagrange point.

The telescope was launched with slightly less speed than needed to reach its final orbit, and slowed down as it travelled away from Earth, in order to reach L_{2} with only the velocity needed to enter its orbit there. The telescope reached L_{2} on 24 January 2022. The flight included three planned course corrections to adjust its speed and direction. This is because the observatory could recover from underthrust (going too slowly), but could not recover from overthrust (going too fast) – to protect highly temperature-sensitive instruments, the sunshield must remain between telescope and Sun, so the spacecraft could not turn around or use its thrusters to slow down.

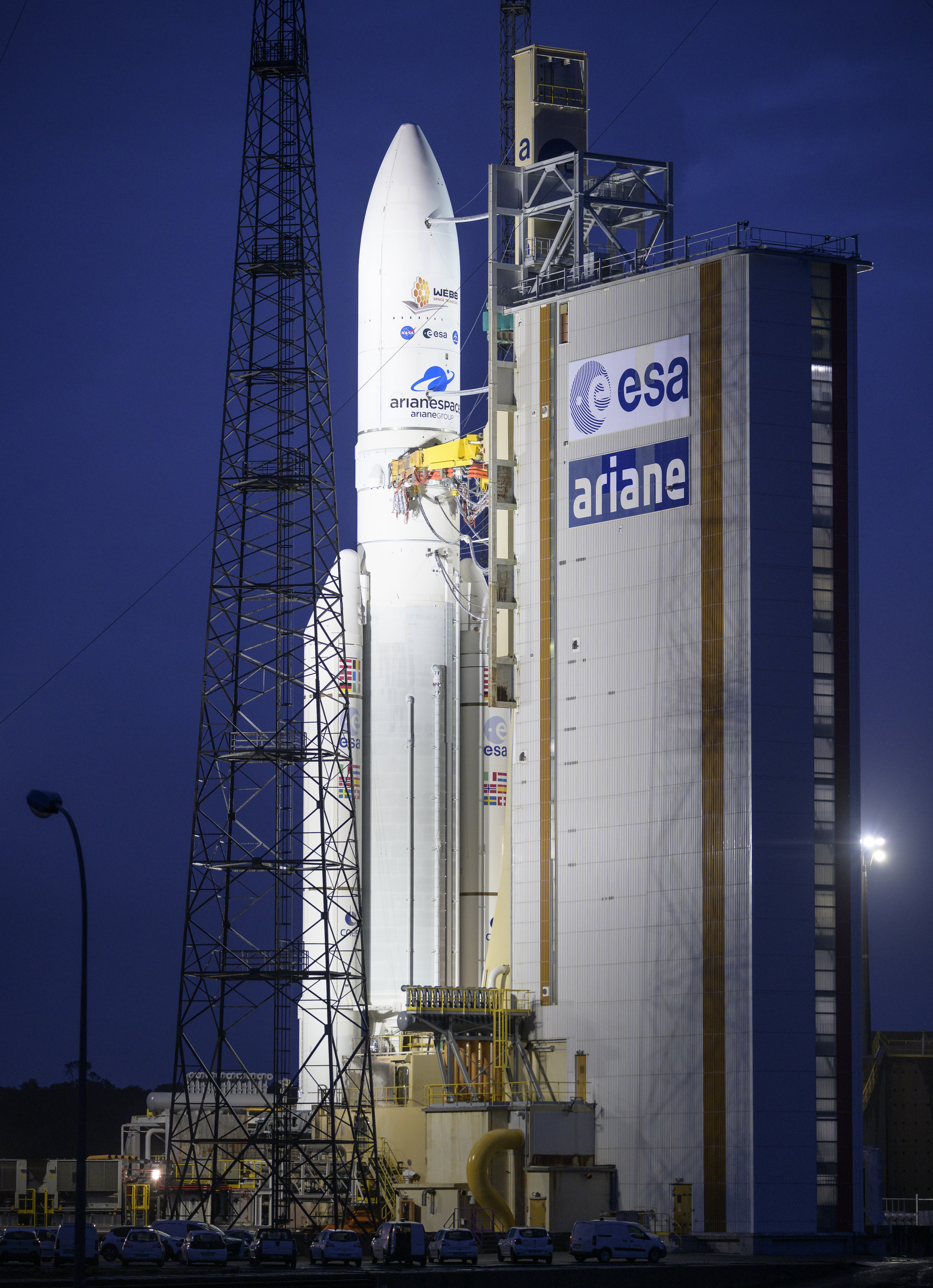
Ariane 5 and JWST at the ELA-3 launch pad

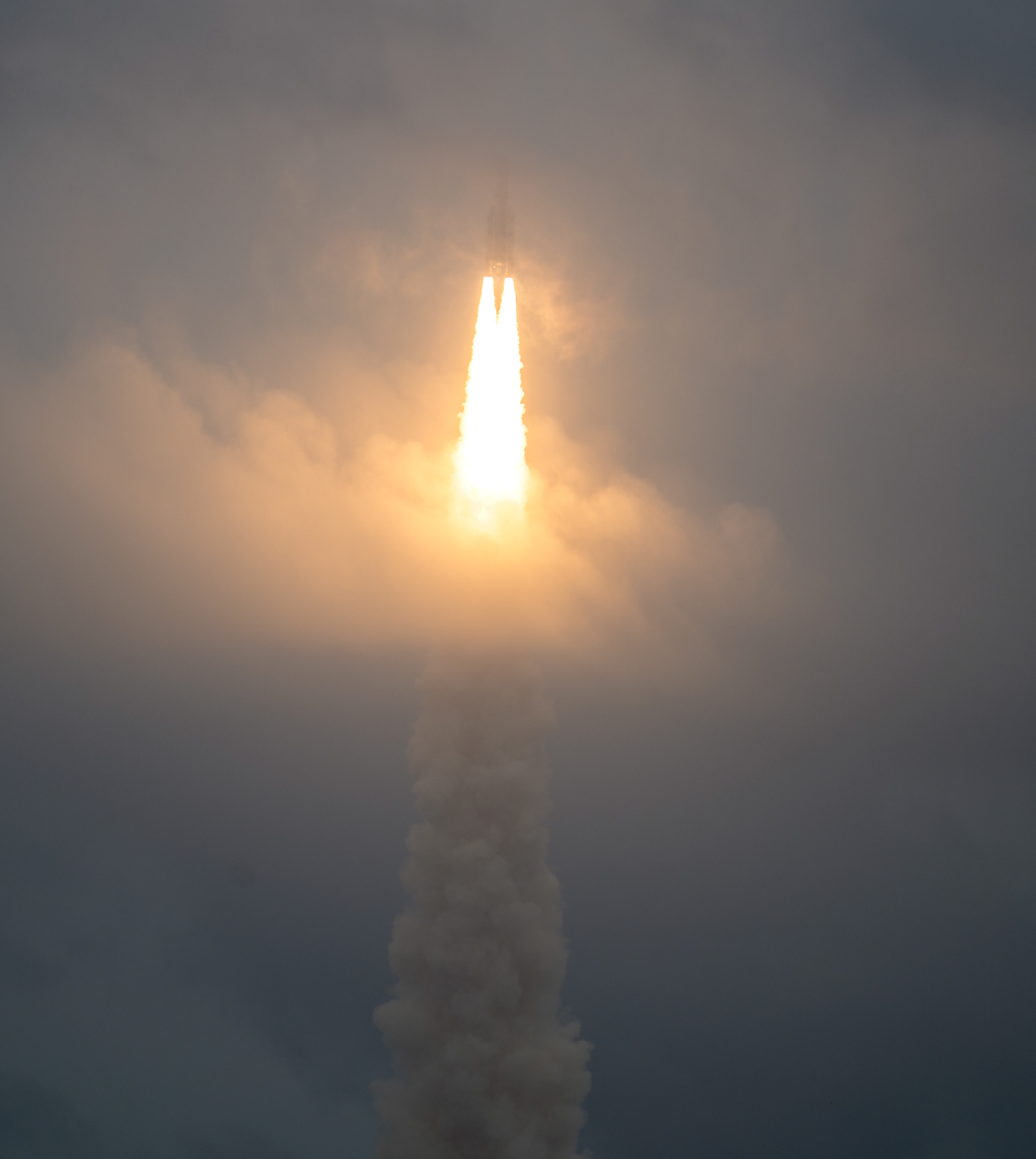
Ariane 5 containing JWST shortly after lift-off

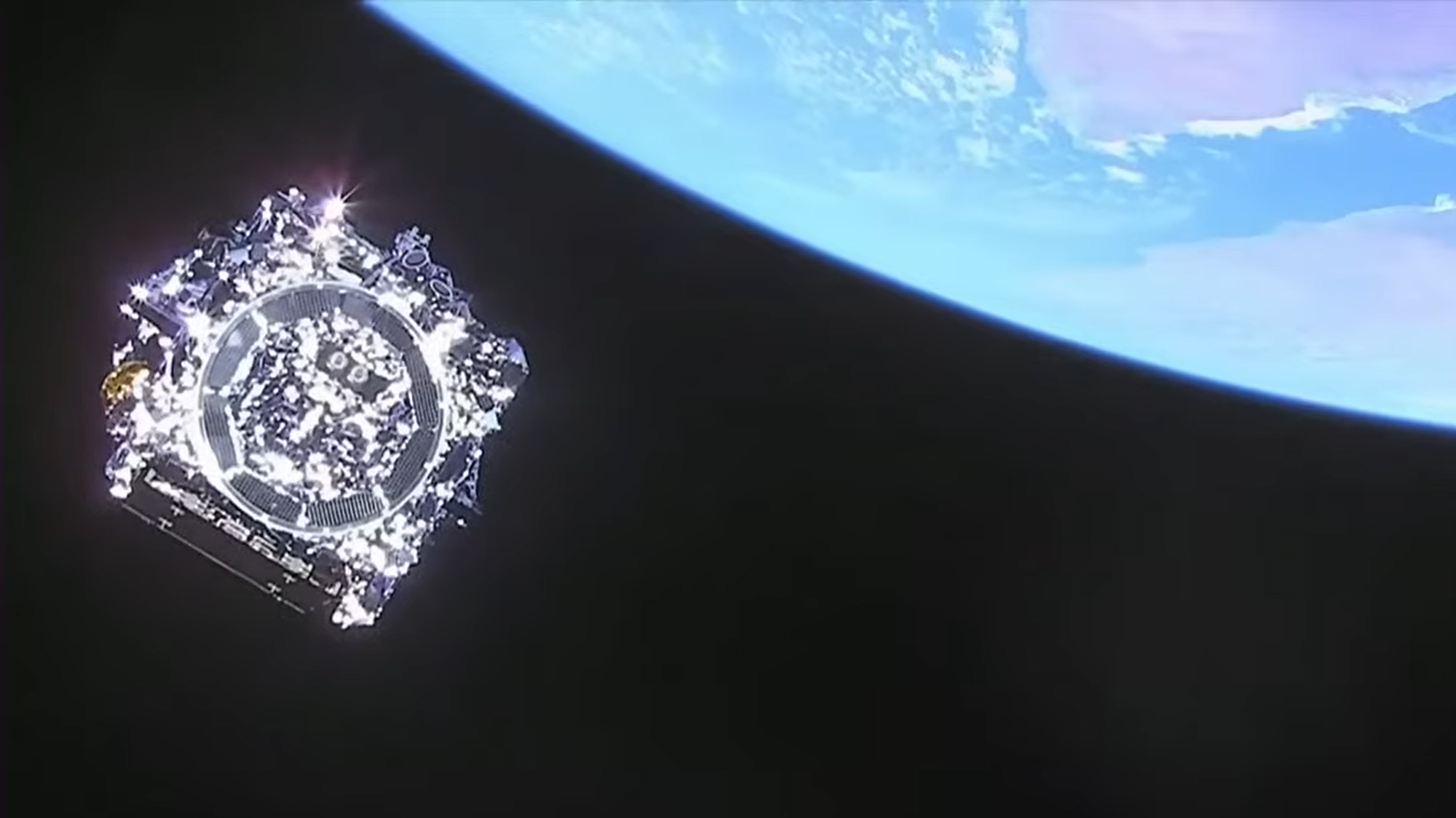
JWST as seen from the ESC-D Cryotechnic upper stage shortly after separation, approximately 29 minutes after launch. Part of the Earth with the Gulf of Aden is visible in the background of the image.

== Transit and structural deployment ==
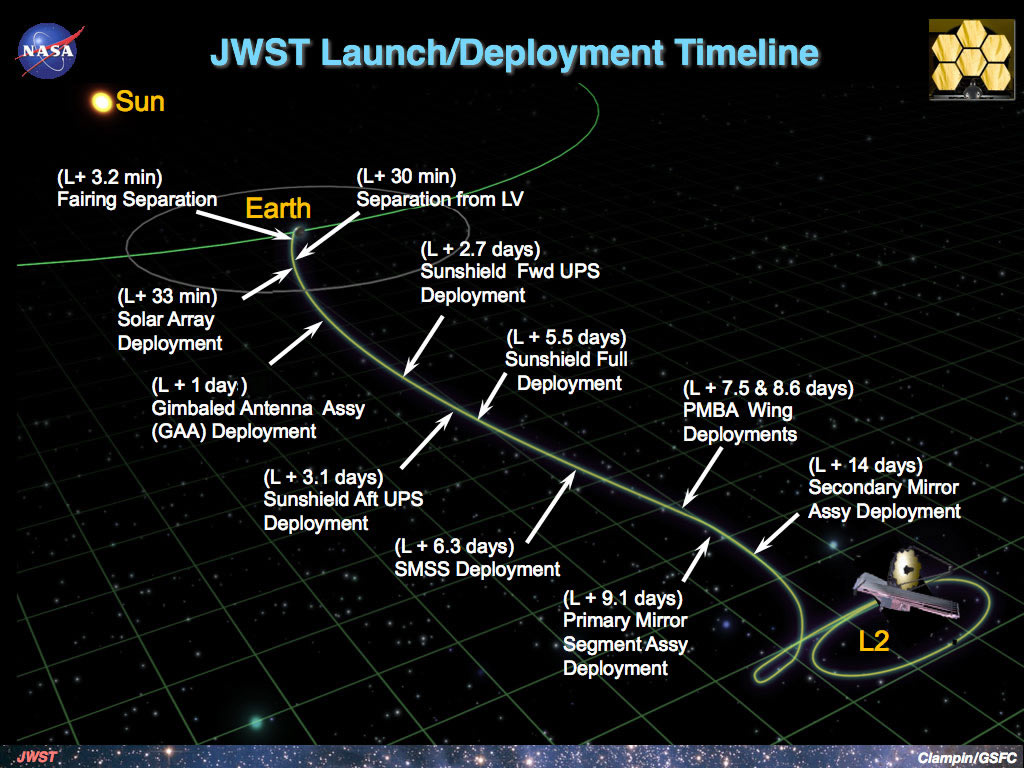
Structural deployment timeline

The James Webb Space Telescope was released from the rocket upper stage 27 minutes after a flawless launch. Starting 31 minutes after launch, and continuing for about 13 days, JWST began the process of deploying its solar array, antenna, sunshield, and mirrors. Nearly all deployment actions are commanded by the Space Telescope Science Institute in Baltimore, except for two early automatic steps, solar panel unfolding and communication antenna deployment. The mission was designed to give ground controllers flexibility to change or modify the deployment sequence in case of problems.

Structural deployment sequence

The electricity-generating solar panel deployed on the day of launch, one and a half minutes after the telescope separated from the Ariane rocket second stage; this took place slightly sooner than expected because launch rotation was much closer to ideal than deployment plans had envisaged. The separation and solar panel extension were both visible in a live feed from a camera on the rocket.

After deployment of the solar arrays, power output was reduced due to a factory pre-set duty cycle in the array regulator module which was set prior to launch. Power usage was greater than that supplied by the solar arrays and this resulted in increased drawdown of the telescope's batteries and higher than expected voltage. To ensure power delivery would be sufficient for spacecraft and science operations, the solar panels were reset and duty cycles were optimized to account for the real world conditions observed including array temperatures. Higher than desired temperatures were observed in some of the shade deployment motors. While the motors remained well within their operational tolerances, to ensure greater margins the spacecraft's attitude was adjusted to aid the motors in reaching their desired temperatures and the motors were rebalanced. This was done based on results from simulator testing. The majority of forecast models of vehicle behavior and conditions matched the operational evolution in space.

At 7:50 p.m. EST on 25 December 2021, about 12 hours after launch, the telescope's pair of primary rockets began firing for 65 minutes to make the first of three planned mid-course corrections. On day two, the high gain communication antenna deployed automatically.

On 27 December 2021, at 60 hours after launch, Webb's rockets fired for nine minutes and 27 seconds to make the second of three mid-course corrections for the telescope to arrive at its L_{2} destination. On 28 December 2021, three days after launch, mission controllers began the multi-day deployment of Webb's all-important sunshield. Controllers sent commands that successfully lowered the forward and aft pallet structures, which contain the sunshield. This deployment precedes the actual unfolding and extension of the delicate shield membranes, which are pulled out of the pallets by telescoping beams in a subsequent step.

On 29 December 2021, controllers successfully extended the Deployable Tower Assembly, a pipe-like column, which moved apart the two main segments of the observatory, the telescope with its mirrors and scientific instruments, and the "bus" holding electronics and propulsion. The assembly lengthened 120 cm (48 in) in a process that lasted six and a half hours, including many preparatory commands. Deployment created the needed distance between the JWST segments to allow extreme cooling of the telescope and room for the sunshield to unfold. On 30 December 2021, controllers successfully completed two more steps in unpacking the observatory. First, commands deployed the aft "momentum flap", a device that provides balance against solar pressure on the sunshield, saving fuel by reducing the need for thruster firing to maintain Webb's orientation. Next, mission control released and rolled up covers that protect the sunshield, exposing it to space for the first time.

On 31 December 2021, the ground team extended the two telescoping "mid booms" from the left and right sides of the observatory, pulling the five sunshield membranes out of their folded stowage in the fore and aft pallets, which were lowered three days earlier. Deployment of the left side boom (in relation to pointing direction of the main mirror) was delayed when mission control did not initially receive confirmation that the sunshield cover had fully rolled up. After looking at extra data for confirmation, the team proceeded to extend the booms. The left side deployed in 3 hours and 19 minutes; the right side took 3 hours and 42 minutes. With that step, Webb's sunshield resembled its complete, kite-shaped form and extended to its full 14-meter (47 ft) width. Commands to separate and tension the membranes were to follow and were expected to take several days.

After resting on New Year's Day, the ground team delayed sunshield tensioning one day to allow time to optimize the observatory's array of solar panels and to adjust the orientation of the observatory slightly to cool the slightly hotter-than-expected sunshield deployment motors. Tensioning of layer one, closest to the Sun and largest of the five in the sunshield, began on 3 January 2022, and was completed at 3:48 p.m. EST. Tensioning of the second and third layers began at 4:09 p.m. EST and took two hours and 25 minutes. On 4 January, controllers successfully tensioned the last two layers, four and five, completing the task at 11:59 a.m. EST.

On 5 January 2022, mission control successfully deployed the telescope's secondary mirror, which locked itself into place to a tolerance of about one and a half millimeters.

The last step of structural deployment was to unfold the wings of the primary mirror. Each panel consists of three primary mirror segments and had to be folded to allow the space telescope to be installed in the fairing of the Ariane rocket for the launch of the telescope. On 7 January 2022, NASA deployed and locked in place the port-side wing, and on 8 January, the starboard-side mirror wing. This successfully completed the structural deployment of the observatory.

On 24 January 2022, at 2:00 p.m. EST, nearly a month after launch, a third and final course correction took place, inserting JWST into its planned halo orbit around the Sun–Earth L_{2} point.

== Commissioning and testing ==
Animation of JWST's halo orbit

On 12 January 2022, while still in transit, mirror alignment began. The primary mirror segments and secondary mirror were moved away from their protective launch positions. This took about 10 days, because the 132 actuator motors are designed to fine-tune the mirror positions at microscopic accuracy (10 nanometer increments) and must each move over 1.2 million increments (12.5 mm) during initial alignment. Additionally, to reduce risk and complexity, and to minimize heat production near the cooling mirrors, only one actuator was moved at a time and the actuators only operated for short periods at a time, limiting total speed to about 1 mm per day. The 18 radius of curvature (ROC) actuators, which adjust curvature of the primary mirror segments, were also moved from launch position at the same time.

After being freed from launch protection, the 18 mirror segments are being fine tuned and aligned to work as a single mirror, a process expected to take around three of the five months allowed for commissioning and testing. Commissioning is complicated by the fact that the telescope's performance and precise shapes of some components will also change microscopically as it continues to cool. Heaters used to protect against water and ice condensation will no longer be needed and will gradually be switched off.

Mirror alignment requires each of the 18 mirror segments, and the secondary mirror, to be positioned to within 50 nanometers. NASA compares the required accuracy by analogy: "If the Webb primary mirror were the size of the United States, each [mirror] segment would be the size of Texas, and the team would need to line the height of those Texas-sized segments up with each other to an accuracy of about 1.5 inches".

James Webb Space Telescope Mirror alignment animations

Segment image identification. 18 mirror segments are moved to determine which segment creates which segment image. After matching the mirror segments to their respective images, the mirrors are tilted to bring all the images near a common point for further analysis.

Segment alignment begins by defocusing the segment images by moving the secondary mirror slightly. Mathematical analysis, called phase retrieval, is applied to the defocused images to determine the precise positioning errors of the segments. Adjustments of the segments then result in 18 well-corrected "telescopes". However, the segments still do not work together as a single mirror.

Image stacking. To put all of the light in a single place, each segment image must be stacked on top of one another. In the image stacking step, the individual segment images are moved so that they fall precisely at the center of the field to produce one unified image. This process prepares the telescope for coarse phasing.

Telescope alignment over instrument fields of view. After fine phasing, the telescope will be well aligned at one place in the NIRCam field of view. Now the alignment must be extended to the rest of the instruments.

Mirror alignment is a complex operation split into seven phases, that has been repeatedly rehearsed using a 1:6 scale model of the telescope. Once the mirrors reach 120 K (−153 °C; −244 °F), NIRCam targets a bright star, the 6th magnitude star HD 84406 in Ursa Major. (Note: HD 84406 is a star approximately 258.5 light-years away in the constellation of Ursa Major. The star is a spectral type G star and has a high proper motion.) (HD 84406 is bright and easily identified, will stay in view for the entire 3 months of commissioning, and is in part of the sky with fewer other stars.) To do this, NIRCam takes 1560 images of the sky (156 images with each of its 10 sensors) and uses these wide-ranging images to determine where in the sky each segment of the main mirror is initially pointing. Initially, the individual primary mirror segments will be greatly misaligned, so the image will contain 18 separate, blurry, images of the star field, each containing an image of the target star. The 18 images of HD 84406 are matched to their respective mirror segments, and the 18 segments are brought into approximate alignment centered on the star ("Segment Image Identification"). Each segment is then individually corrected of its major focusing errors, using a technique called phase retrieval, resulting in 18 separate, but individually good quality, images from the 18 mirror segments ("Segment Alignment"). The 18 images from each segment, are then moved so they precisely overlap to create a single image ("Image Stacking").

With the mirrors now positioned for almost correct images, they must be fine tuned to their operational accuracy of 50 nanometers, less than one wavelength of the light that will be detected. A technique called dispersed fringe sensing compares images from 20 pairings of mirrors, allowing most of the errors to be corrected ("Coarse Phasing"), and then the same technique is used with special optical elements to introduce ±4 and ±8 waves of defocus to each segment's image, allowing detection and correction of almost all remaining errors ("Fine Phasing"). These two processes are repeated three times, and Fine Phasing will be routinely checked throughout the telescope's operation.

After three rounds of Coarse and Fine Phasing, the telescope will be well aligned at one place in the NIRCam field of view. Measurements will be made at various points in the captured image, across all instruments, and corrections calculated from the detected variations in intensity, giving a well-aligned outcome across all instruments ("Telescope Alignment Over Instrument Fields of View").

Finally, a last round of Fine Phasing and checks of image quality on all instruments is performed, to ensure that any small residual errors remaining from the previous steps, are corrected ("Iterate Alignment for Final Correction"). The telescope's mirror segments are then aligned and able to capture precise focused images. If needed, the process allows for earlier steps to be retested again, to ensure accuracy.

In preparation for alignment, NASA announced at 19:28 UTC on 3 February 2022, that NIRCam had detected the telescope's first photons (although not yet complete images). On 11 February 2022, NASA announced the telescope had almost completed phase 1 of alignment, with every segment of its primary mirror having located and imaged the target star HD 84406, and all segments brought into approximate alignment. Phase 1 alignment was completed on 18 February 2022, and a week later, phases 2 and 3 were also completed on 25 February 2022. This means the 18 segments are working in unison, however until all 7 phases are complete, the segments still act as 18 smaller telescopes rather than one larger one. At the same time as the primary mirror is being commissioned, hundreds of other instrument commissioning and calibration tasks are also ongoing.

== Gallery of calibration and test images ==
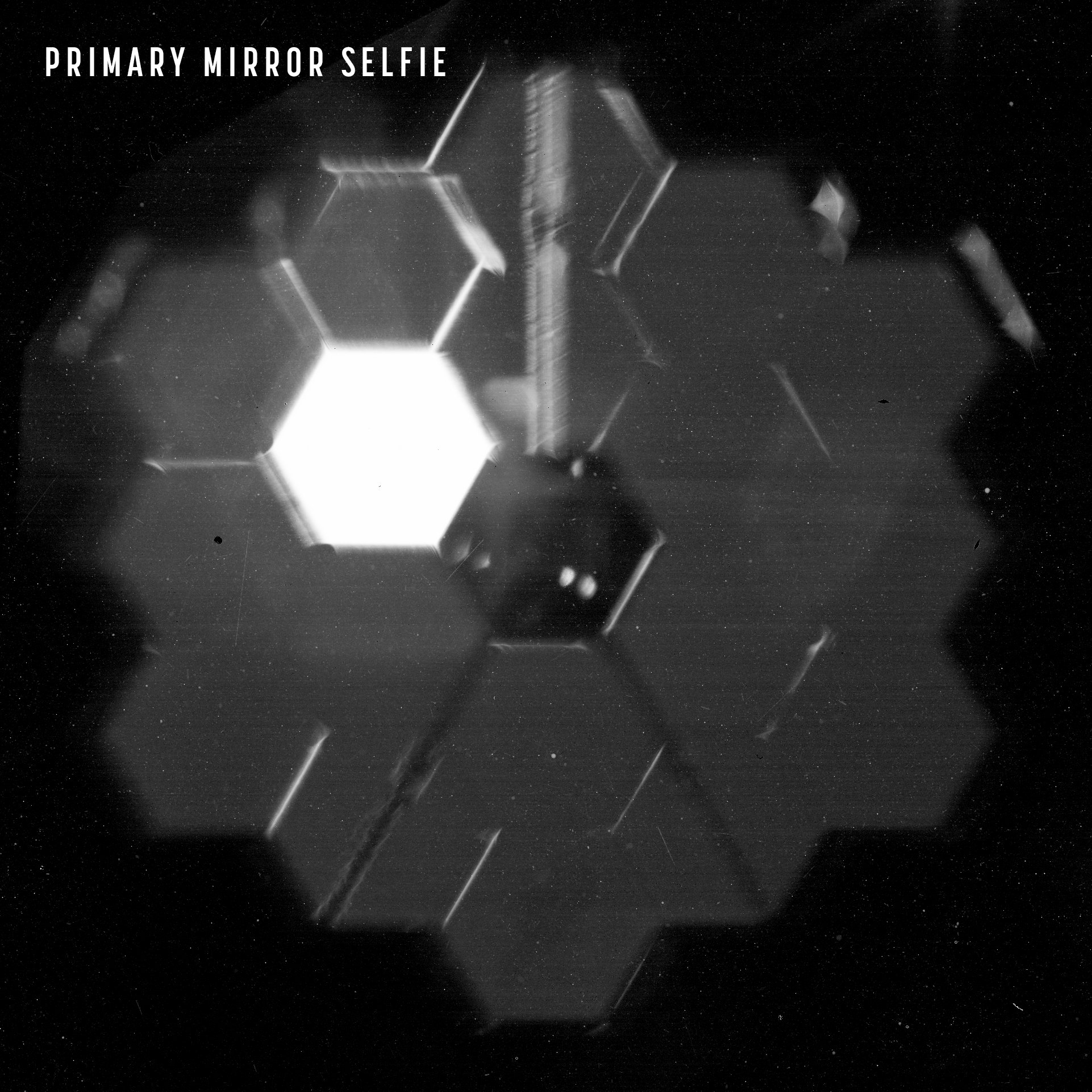
Selfie: Primary mirror of JWST at destination

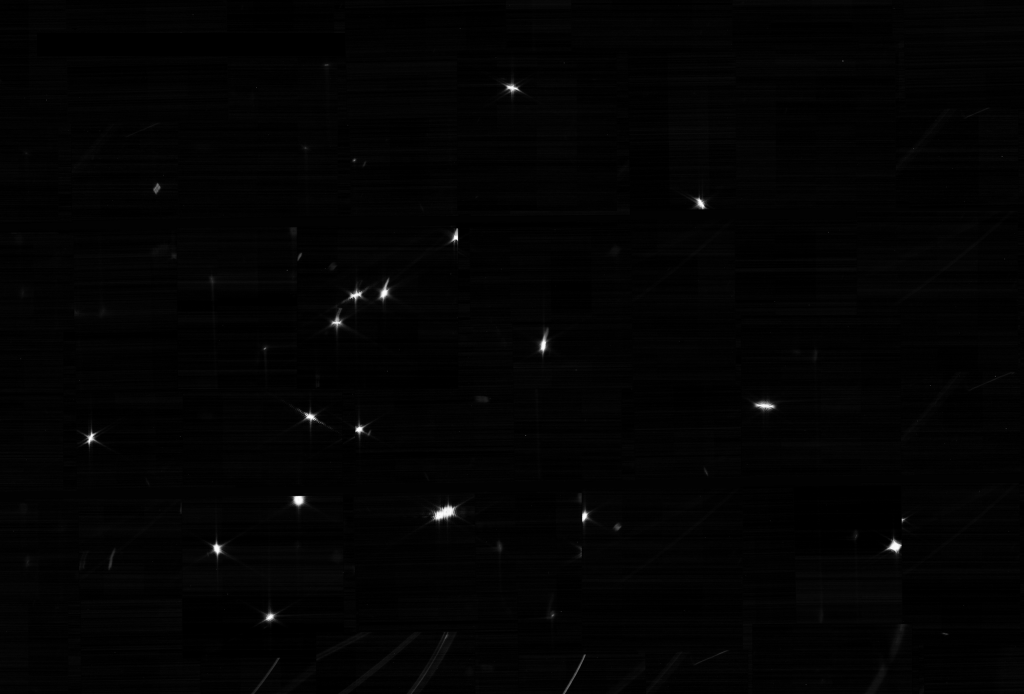
18 images of same target star HD 84406 by the 18 unfocused mirror segments.

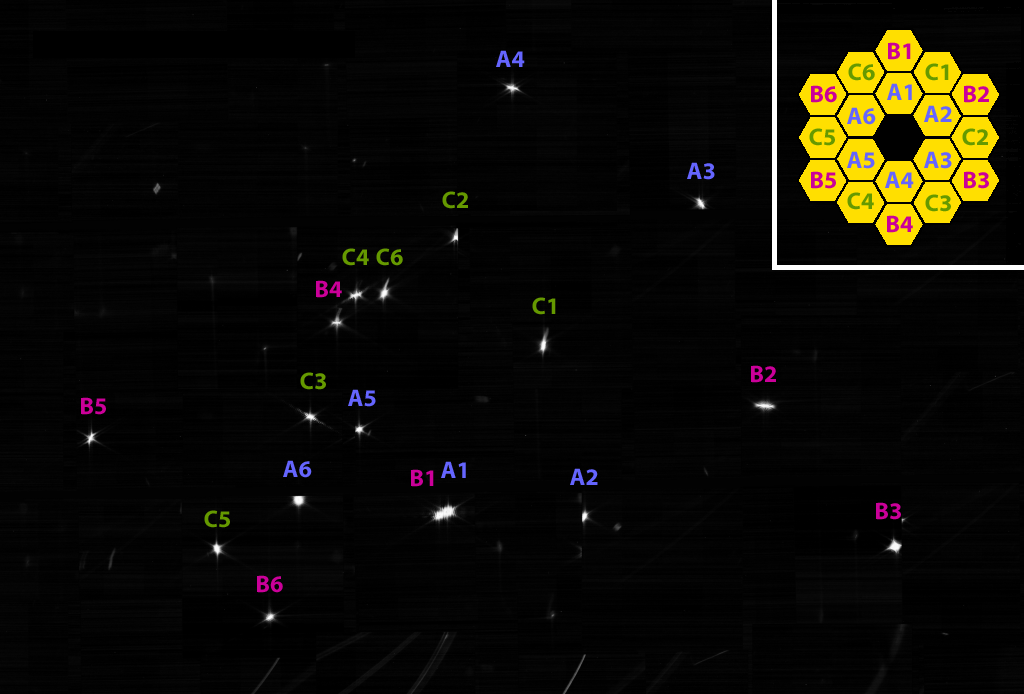
Phase 1 interim image, annotated with the related mirror segments that took each image

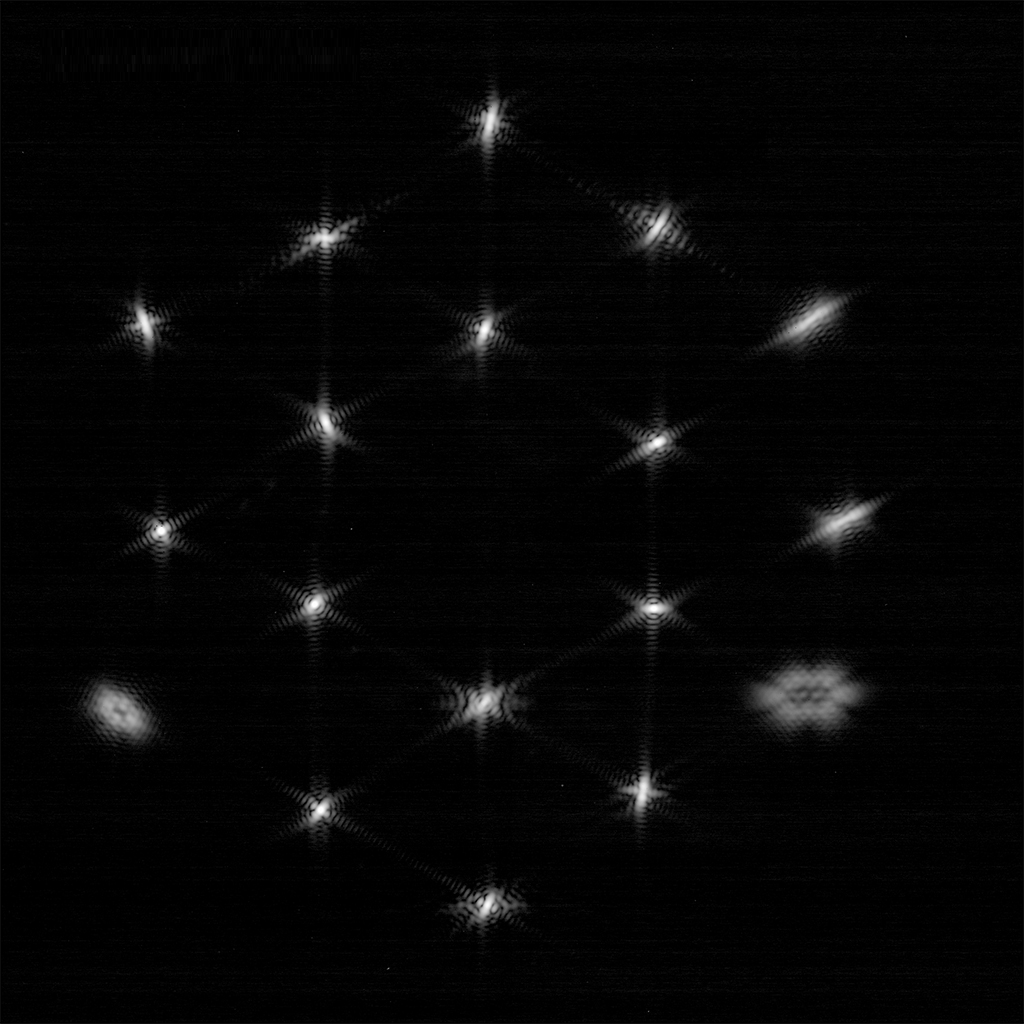
18 unfocused images of same target star HD 84406

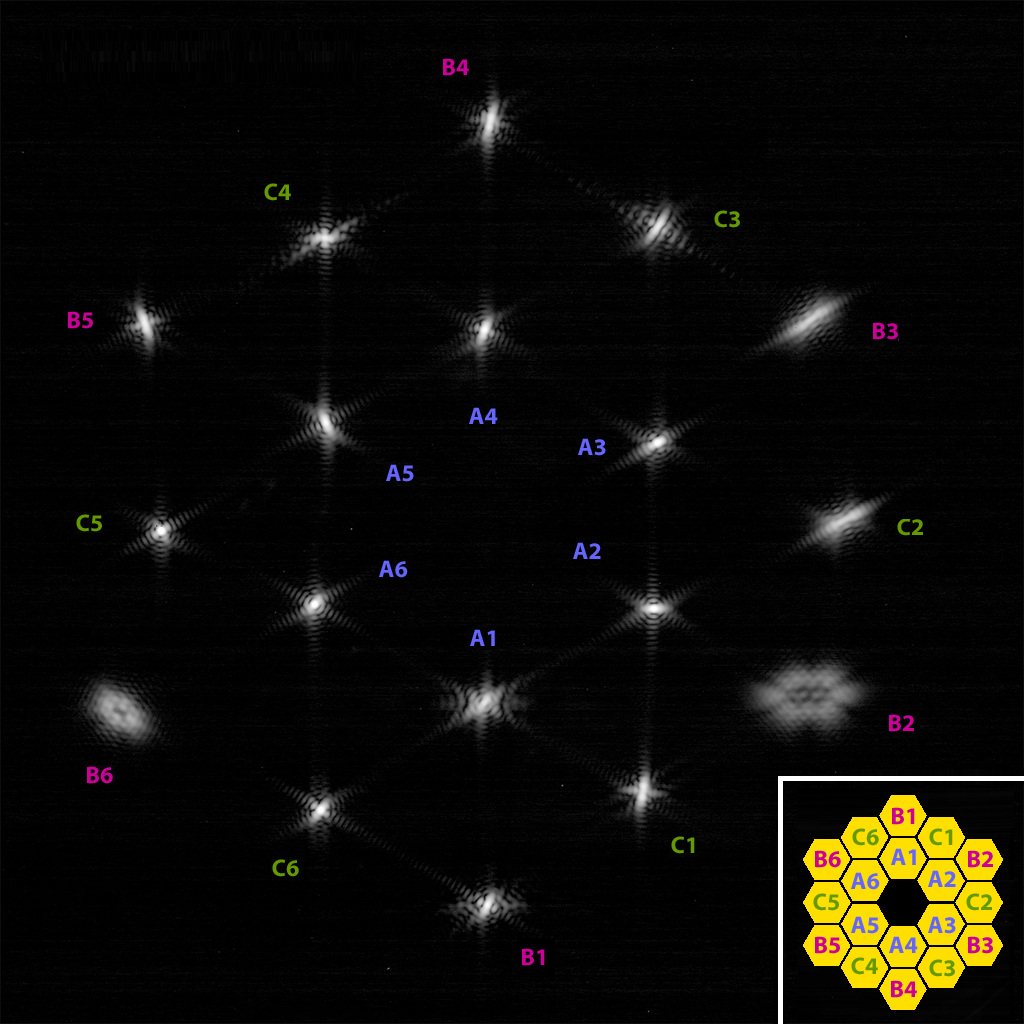
Phase 1 annotated completion image of HD 84406

Phase 2 completion, showing "before and after" effects of segment alignment

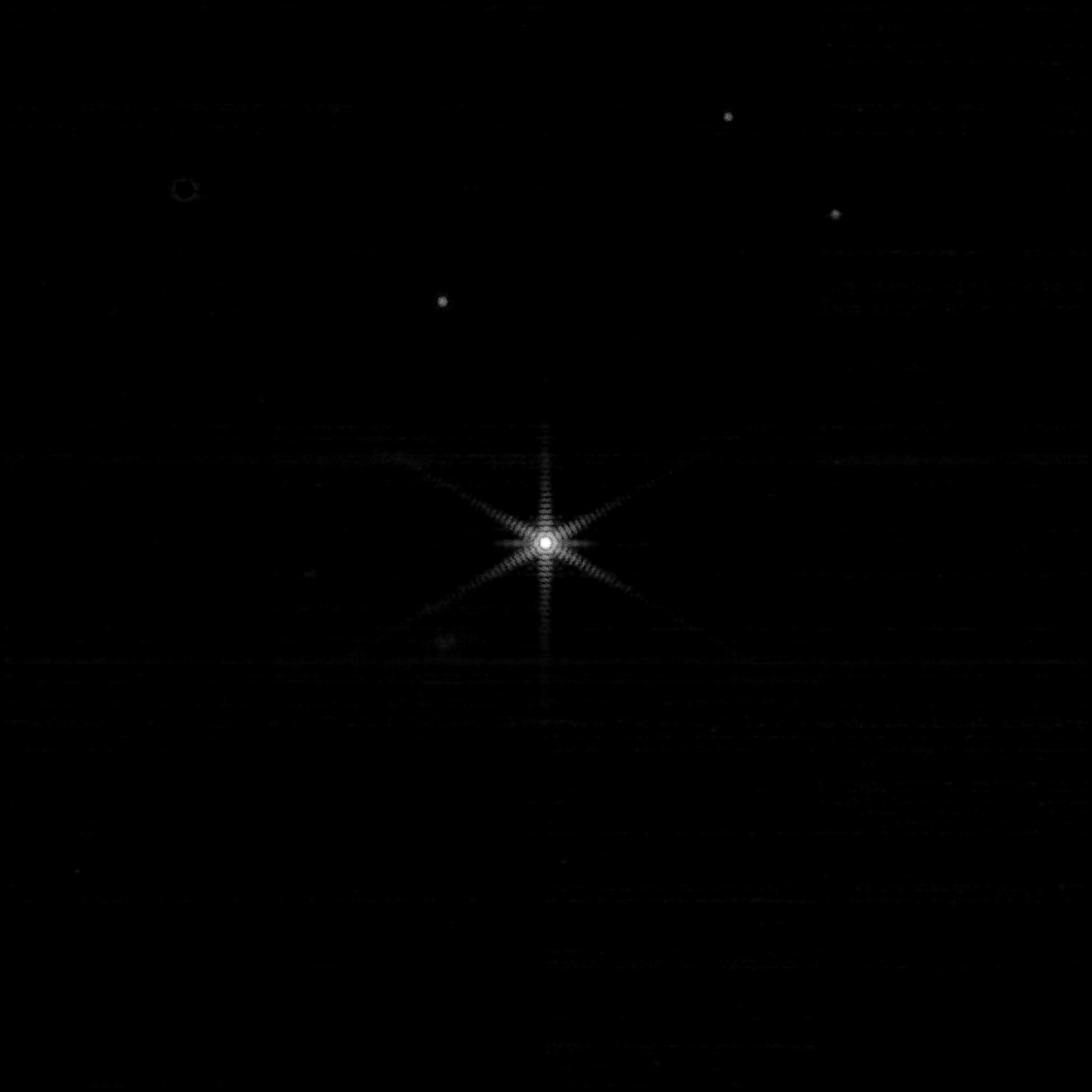
Phase 3 completion, showing 18 segments "stacked" as a single image of HD 84406

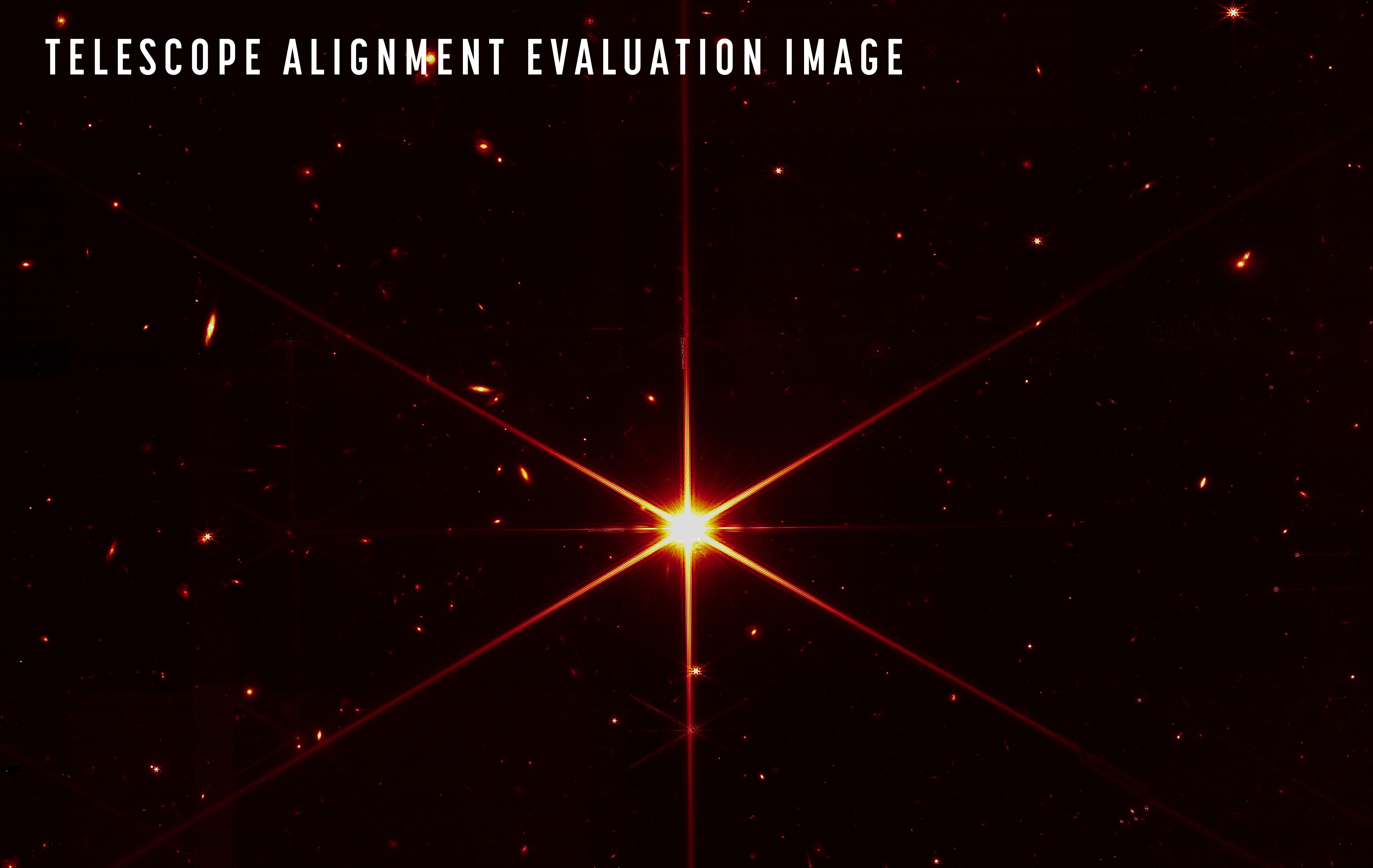
Star 2MASS J17554042+6551277 (Note: 2MASS J17554042+6551277, also known as UNSW-V 084 and TYC 4212-1079-1, is a star in the constellation Draco, in the Milky Way. It is located almost 2,000 light years away from Earth, within a degree of the north ecliptic pole. Its visual apparent magnitude m_{v} is 10.95, which makes it much too faint to be observed with the naked eye. It is cooler than the Sun, but some 13 to 16 times brighter in visible light, and is consequently not a sun-like star. Its motion vector in the direction of the Sun is 51 km/s.) captured by NIRCam instrument

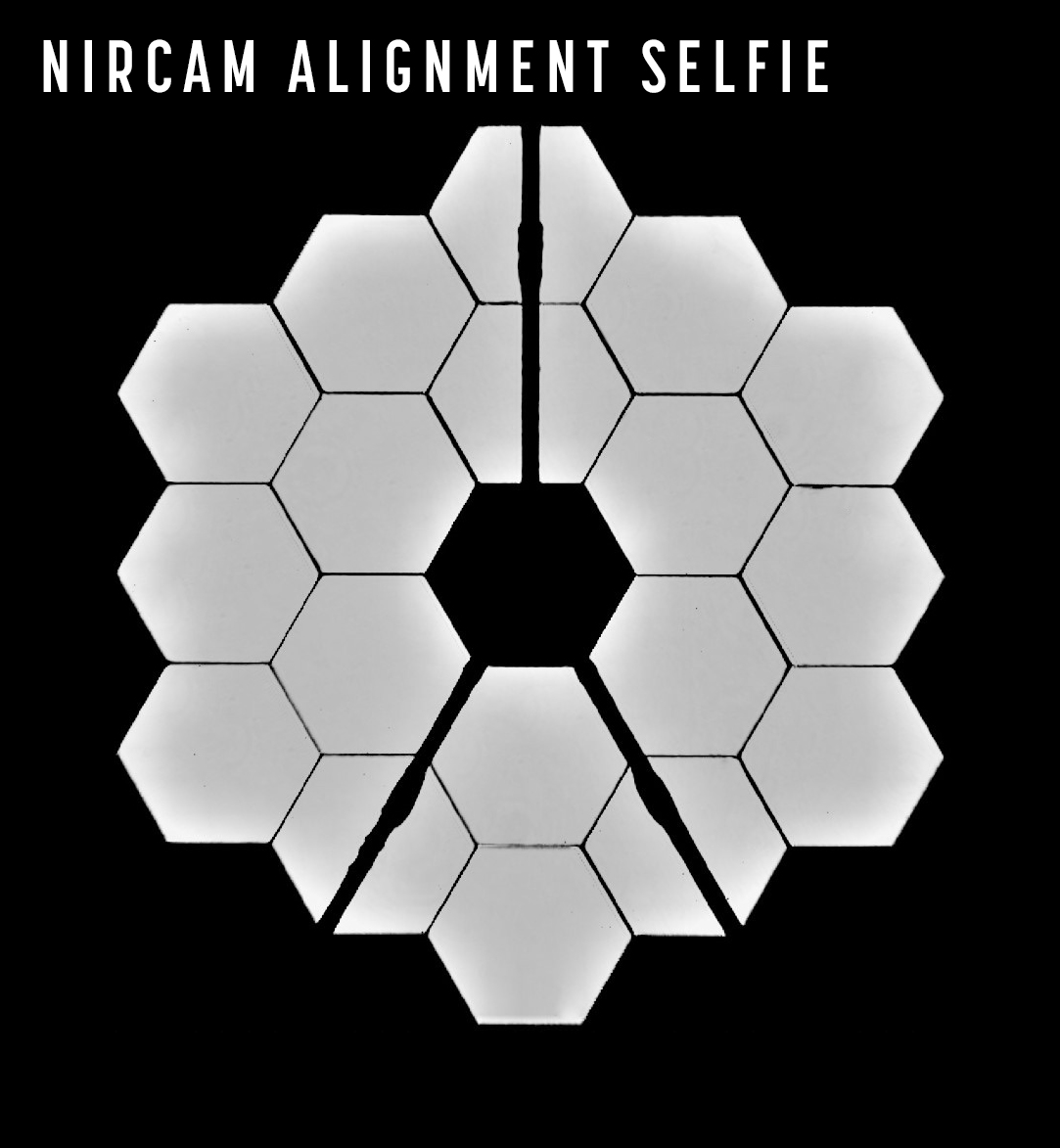
A "selfie" taken by the NIRCam during the alignment process

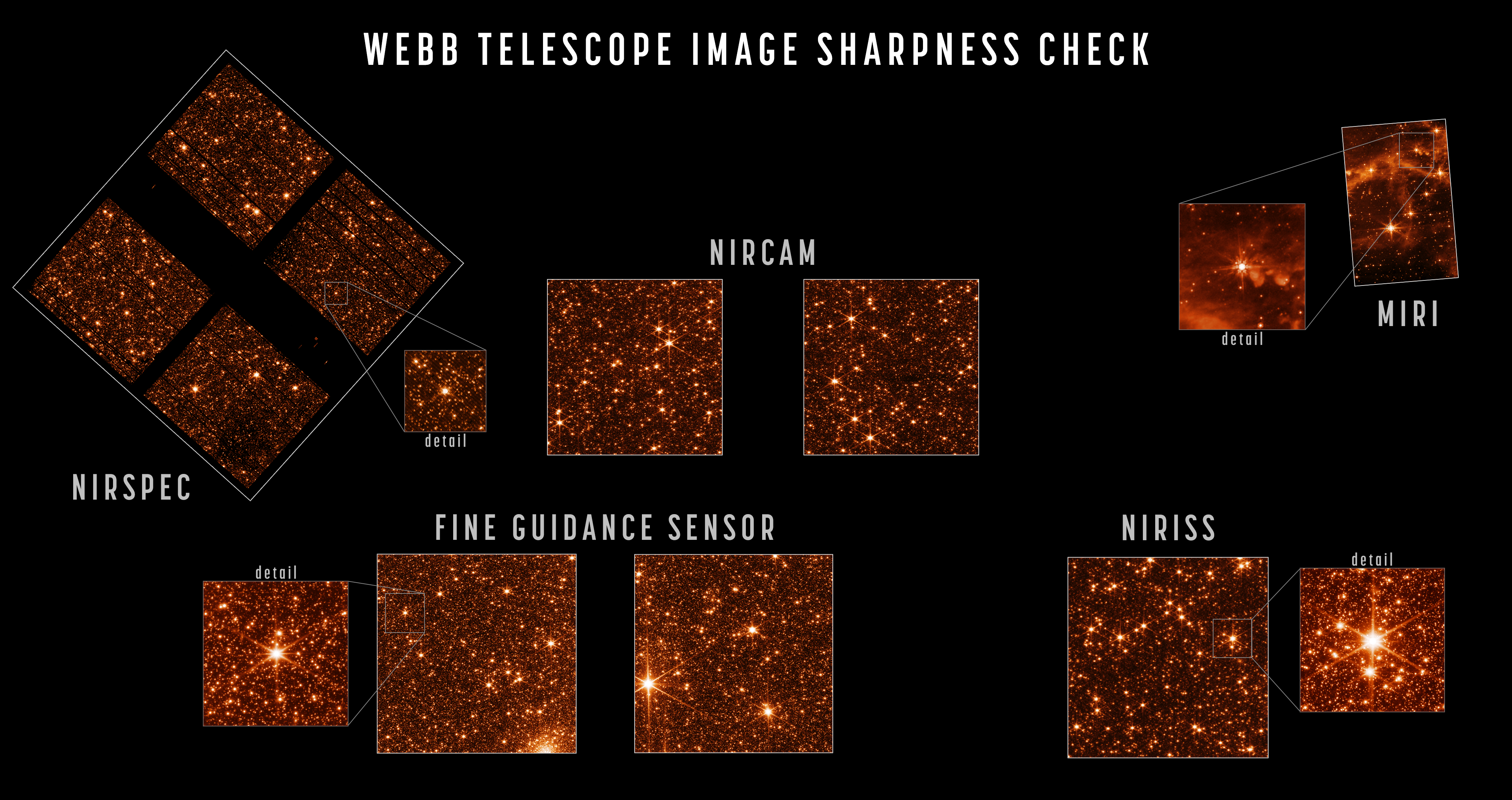
Images of sharply focused stars in the field of view of each instrument demonstrate that the telescope is fully aligned and in focus. The sizes and positions of the images shown here depict the relative arrangement of each of Webb's instruments in the telescope's focal plane, each pointing at a slightly offset part of the sky relative to one another. (Note: For this test, Webb pointed at part of the Large Magellanic Cloud, a small satellite galaxy of the Milky Way, providing a dense field of hundreds of thousands of stars across all the observatory's sensors. Webb's three imaging instruments are NIRCam (images shown here at a wavelength of 2 microns), NIRISS (image shown here at 1.5 microns), and MIRI (shown at 7.7 microns, a longer wavelength revealing emission from interstellar clouds as well as starlight). NIRSpec is a spectrograph rather than imager but can take images, such as the 1.1 micron image shown here, for calibrations and target acquisition. The dark regions visible in parts of the NIRSpec data are due to structures of its microshutter array, which has several hundred thousand controllable shutters that can be opened or shut to select which light is sent into the spectrograph. Lastly, Webb's Fine Guidance Sensor tracks guide stars to point the observatory accurately and precisely; its two sensors are not generally used for scientific imaging but can take calibration images such as those shown here. This image data is used not just to assess image sharpness but also to precisely measure and calibrate subtle image distortions and alignments between sensors as part of Webb's overall instrument calibration process.)

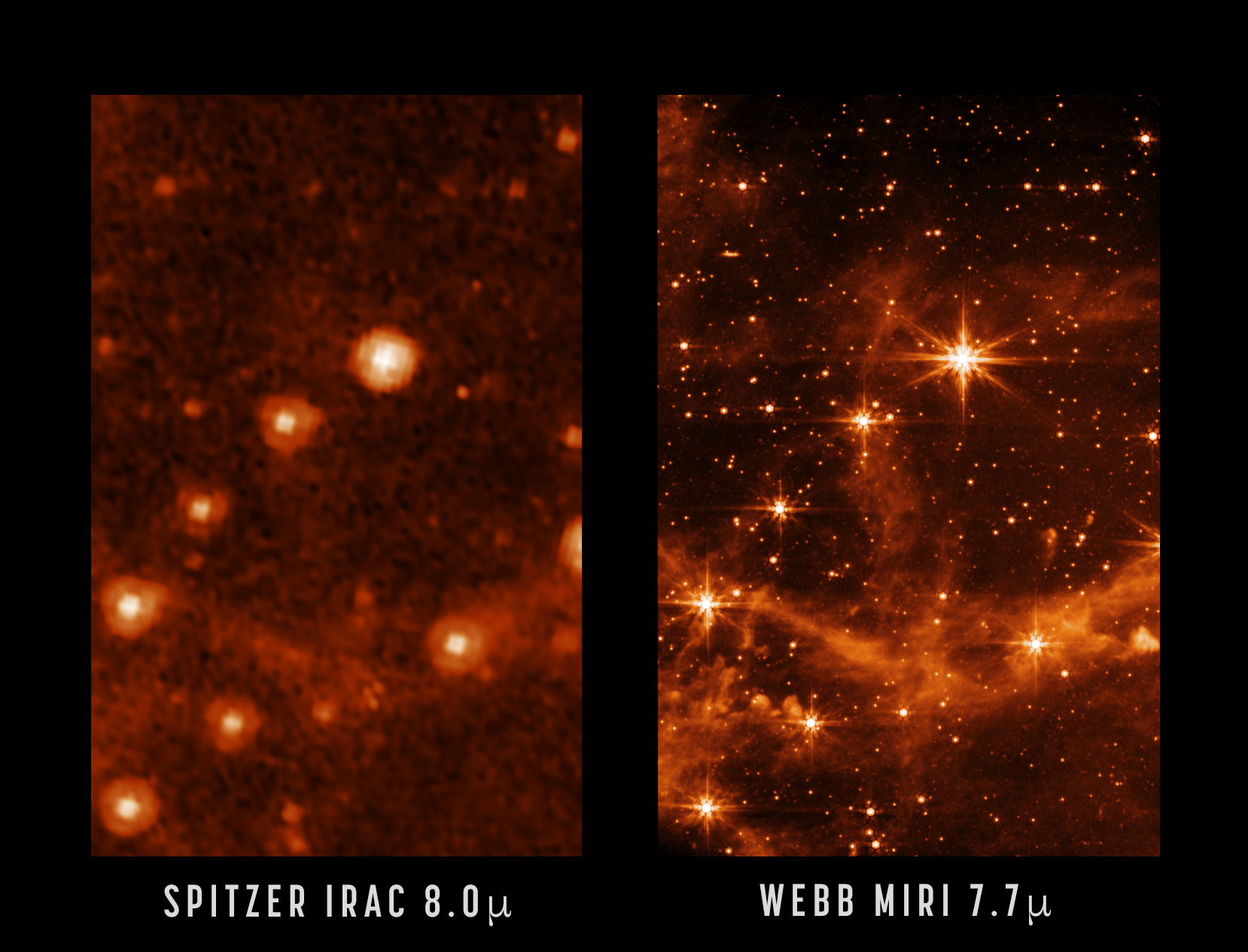
Image comparison between "old" Spitzer and new JWST

== See also ==
- Timeline of the James Webb Space Telescope
