= Unknown: Killer Robots =

Unknown: Killer Robots is a 2023 documentary film about the use of AI in warfare.

A review in The Daily Telegraph said that the subject was "handled with some hyperbole alongside the seriousness" and that "it gives a sense of just how advanced AI is already, through the eyes of the scientists racing to develop devices that use it as well as those campaigning to limit their potential."

As of January 2024, review aggregation website Rotten Tomatoes gives the film a score of 100% based on 8 reviews.
