= Longest Third Date =

- Directed by: Brent Hodge
- Starring: Matt Robertson; Khani Le
- Release date: 2023
- Running time: 75 minutes
- Country: United States
- Language: English

Longest Third Date is a 2023 documentary film, directed by Brent Hodge about Khani Le and Matt Robertson, who found themselves stuck on their third date in Costa Rica during the COVID-19 pandemic.

== Premise ==
The documentary tells the love story of Khani Le and Matt Robertson. After matching on dating app, the pair went on two successful dates before deciding to go to Costa Rica for their third date to spend weekend together. It was supposed to be a short stay but due to COVID-19 lockdowns, their flight got cancelled and they had to stay together in Costa Rica for more than 70 days.

== Release ==
The documentary was released on Netflix on April 18, 2023.

== Reception ==
On Rotten Tomatoes it holds a score of 80% based on 5 reviews. Sabrina McFarland of the Common Sense Media gives the rating of 4/5 and said; "Brent Hodge depicts an intense interpretation of a young couple who manage to connect through a dating app." Chris Vognar of Rolling Stone in his review said that "the tale of Matt and Khani is quite charming. With any luck they’ll have a great story to tell -- and show -- their grandchildren someday. But that doesn’t mean it makes for good television."
