= Mark Cavendish: Never Enough =

2023 sports documentary film

- Directed by: Alex Kiehl
- Produced by: Cecilia Gomez Blanco
- Release date: August 2, 2023

Mark Cavendish: Never Enough is a documentary film about the professional cyclist, Mark Cavendish. It was released on Netflix on August 2, 2023 and features behind the scenes footage and interviews documenting his professional cycling career.
