= Ariane flight VA256 =

2021 rocket launch; placed the James Webb Space Telescope into orbit

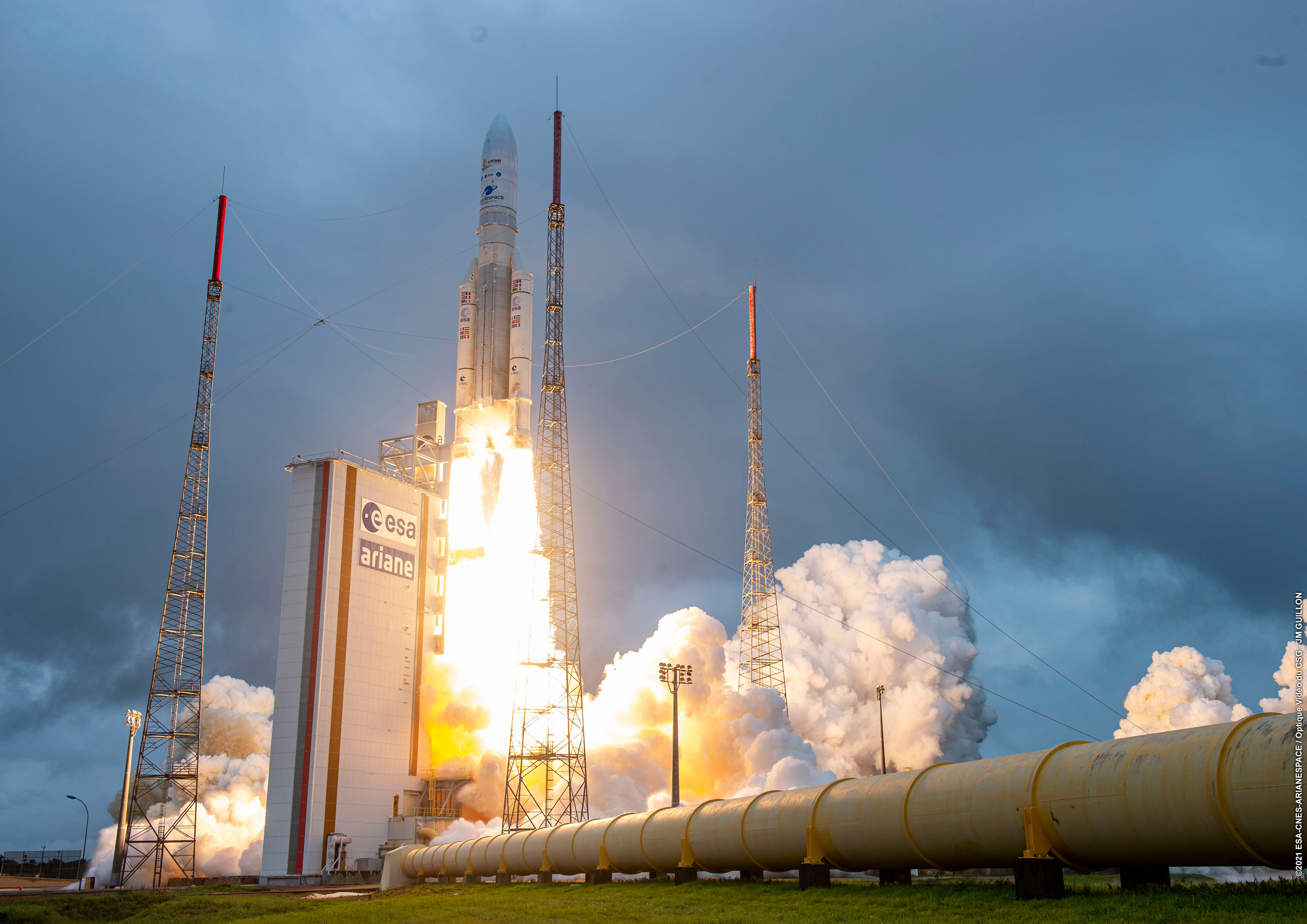
- Ariane 5 containing the James Webb Space Telescope moments after lift-off

Ariane 5 ECA+ launch
- Launch: 25 December 2021, 12:20:00 UTC
- Operator: Arianespace
- Pad: Guiana Space Centre, ELA-3
- Payload: James Webb Space Telescope
- Outcome: Success

Components
- Serial no.: 5113

Ariane launches

Ariane flight VA256 was an Ariane 5 rocket flight that launched the James Webb Space Telescope (JWST) into space on 25 December 2021. It was 2021's final Ariane flight, its most valuable payload to date, and the 256th Ariane mission. The launch was described by NASA as "flawless" and "perfect".

== Launch configuration ==
=== Rocket ===
Ariane 5 is a heavy lift two-stage rocket with two solid fuel boosters. It was used in its ECA+ variant, which offers the highest payload mass capacity. The total launch mass of the vehicle is 770,000 kg (1,700,000 lb).

=== Payload ===
The only payload on the flight was the James Webb Space Telescope (JWST), a space-based observatory built by NASA and ESA. The launch is one of the European Space Agency's contributions to the project. The telescope had a launch mass of about 6,500 kg (14,300 lb) and a design lifetime of 5 to 10 years.

== Preparation ==
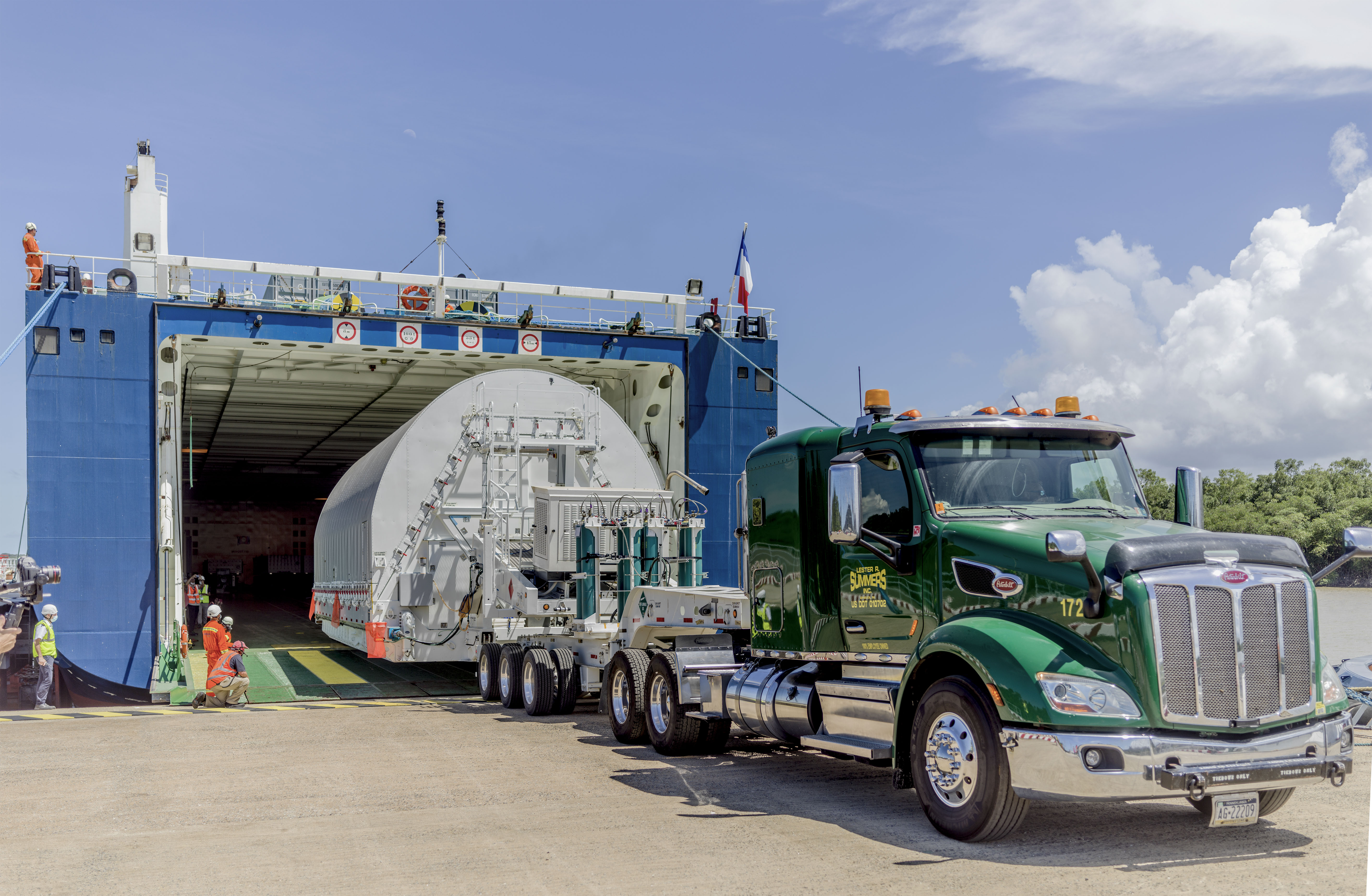
Unloading the JWST from the MN Colibri

=== JWST Arrival in Kourou ===
The James Webb Space Telescope arrived at a port in Kourou in French Guiana, on 12 October 2021 where it was unloaded from the MN Colibri cargo ship and transported by truck to the space centre.

=== Integration incident ===
On 22 November 2021 an incident was reported by NASA and Arianespace that a clamp band securing the payload to the adapter was released during integration activities, causing vibrations to the telescope. After some tests were performed, a review board concluded on 24 November 2021 that no payload component was damaged, and fuelling operations could be started.

=== Fuelling operations ===
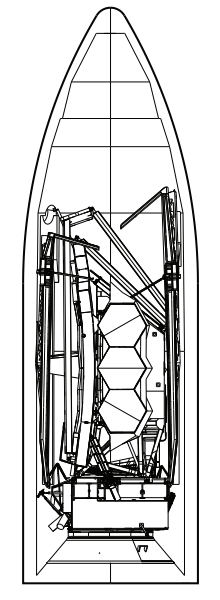
Drawing of JWST in the payload faring

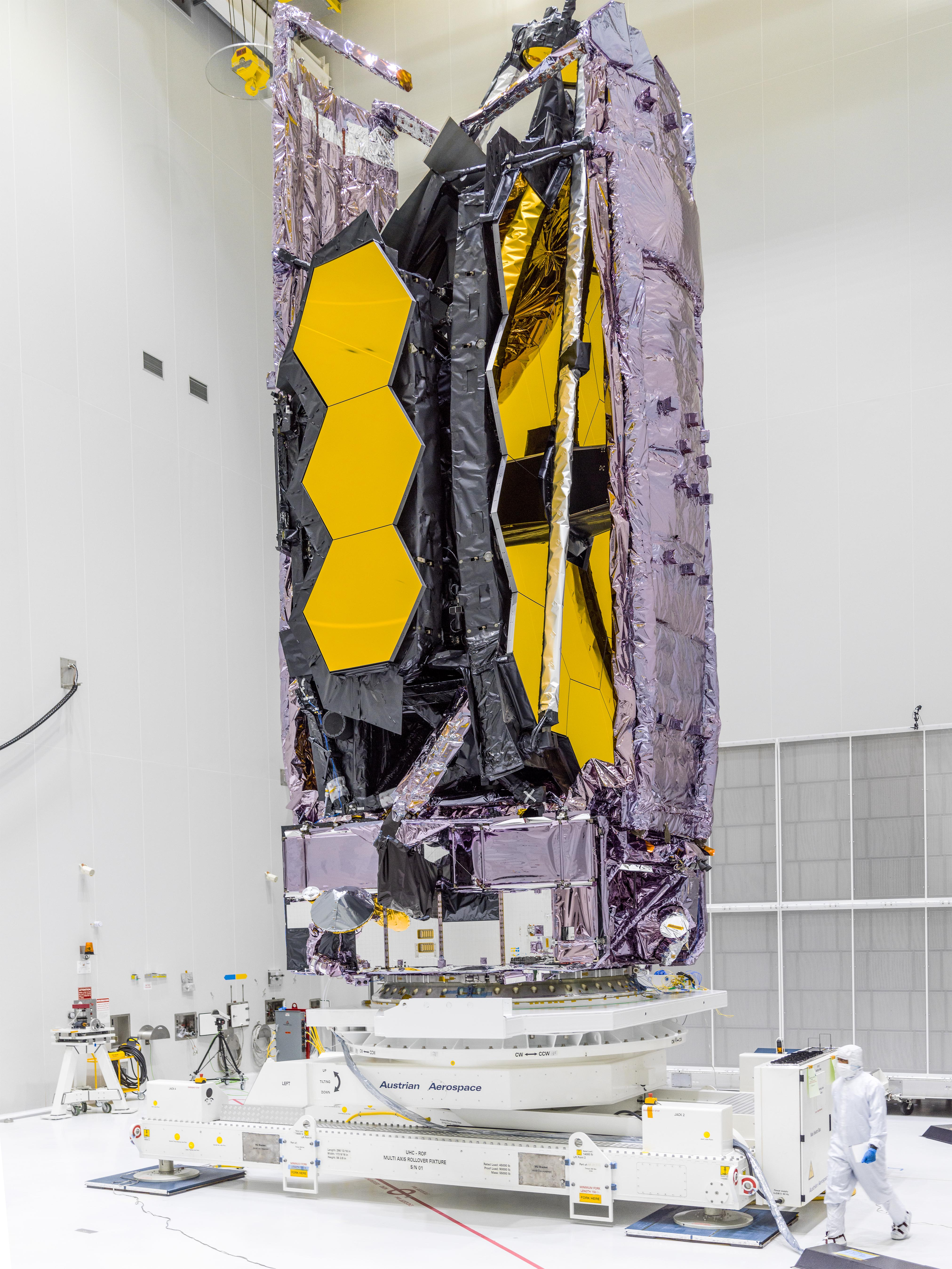
JWST in the cleanroom in Guiana

Spacecraft fuelling operations began on 25 November 2021, the fuelling system was disconnected on 3 December 2021, and verifications were concluded on 5 December 2021. The telescope's hypergolic fuel system was filled with approximately 168 kg (370 lb) of hydrazine and 133 kg (293 lb) of dinitrogen tetroxide, needed to reach and maintain its orbit after separation from the launch vehicle.

=== Final assembly ===
Following the rocket, which had already arrived on 29 November 2021, the telescope was moved to the final assembly building (Bâtiment d'Assemblage Final or BAF) on 7 December 2021. The payload was encapsulated inside the fairing on top of the rocket on 21 December 2021.

=== Interface communication issue ===
On 14 December 2021, a joint press release by NASA and Arianespace revealed that "a communication issue between the observatory and the launch vehicle system" was being addressed, further delaying the launch to no earlier than 24 December 2021.

=== Weather issue ===
Unfavorable weather forecasts for 24 December 2021 delayed the launch to Christmas Day, 25 December 2021.

== Launch ==
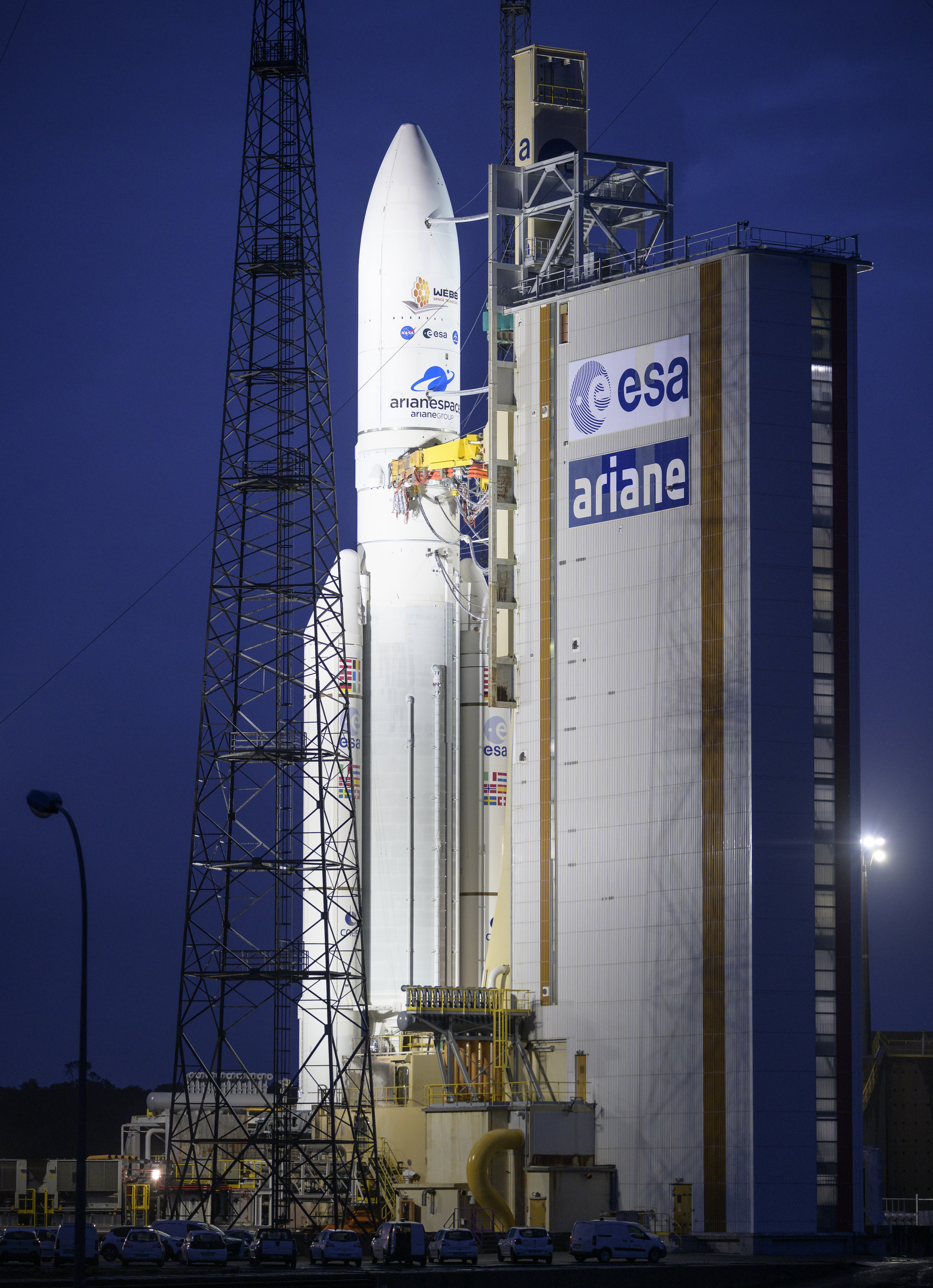
Ariane 5 carrying the JWST at the ELA-3 launch pad

The rocket was launched from the ELA-3 launch pad of the Guiana Space Centre on 25 December 2021 (Christmas Day) at 12:20 UTC (09:20 local time, 7:20 am U.S. EST). The Range Operations Manager (DDO (French: Directeur des Opérations, lit. 'Director of Operations')) of the launch was Jean-Luc Voyer, who concluded his shift by saying, "Go Webb!"

The launch was described by NASA as "flawless" and "perfect". A NASA systems engineer said "the efficiency or the accuracy with which Ariane put us on orbit and our accuracy and effectiveness in implementing our mid-course corrections" meant that there is "quite a bit of fuel margin ... roughly speaking, it’s around 20 years of propellant."

== Orbit ==
The James Webb Space Telescope was injected into a transfer trajectory that took it to the second Earth-Sun Lagrange point (L_{2}).

The separation of the launch vehicle second stage and the spacecraft occurred approximately 27 minutes after liftoff. The second stage downloaded video, the last known time the telescope will be seen, of the separation and initial deployment of the solar panels. After this separation, the telescope became autonomous and began its deployment sequence. About 29 days after liftoff, it executed a maneuver placing it into a halo orbit around the L_{2} point, where it can perform its science mission. Its next five months were spent on cooling NIRCam and the Mid-Infrared Instrument down further, calibrating its mirrors while focusing on HD 84406, a bright star in the constellation Ursa Major, and testing the instruments.

== See also ==
- James Webb Space Telescope
- Timeline of the James Webb Space Telescope
- Launch and commissioning of the James Webb Space Telescope
- Ariane launches
