= Unknown: Cosmic Time Machine =

Documentary on James Webb Space Telescope

- Original poster
- Directed by: Shai Gal
- Produced by: Nell Constantinople, Leah van der Werff
- Edited by: Mike Culyba
- Music by: Gil Talmi
- Release date: July 24, 2023
- Running time: 62 minutes
- Country: United States
- Language: English

Unknown: Cosmic Time Machine is an episode of the four-episode 2023 Netflix documentary series Unknown, about NASA's development and launch of the James Webb Space Telescope. The episode follows the development of the telescope from the 1990s through its 2021 launch and 2022 deployment, and the unveiling of some of the first images from the new space telescope.

The episode was directed by Shai Gal and released on Netflix on July 24, 2023.

== Reception ==
Decider gave the episode a mostly positive review, praising its scope and presentation. Jeff Foust of The Space Review described it as "extraordinary".
