= Fine Guidance Sensor and Near Infrared Imager and Slitless Spectrograph =

Canadian aligner and spectrometer on JWST

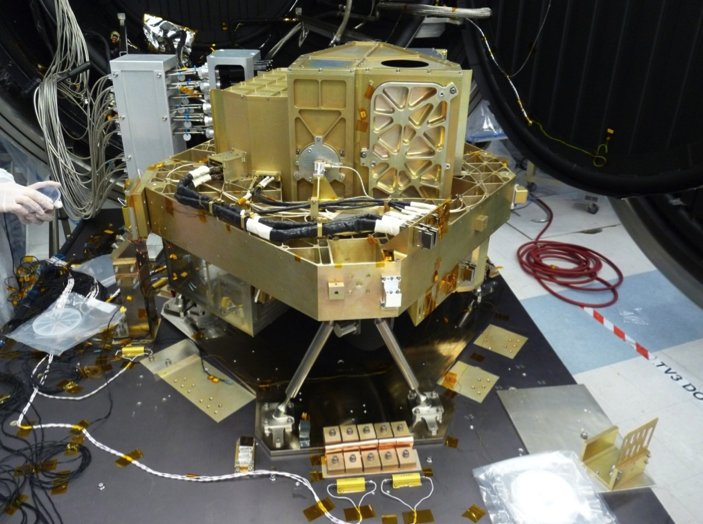
FGS/NIRISS ETU, 2016

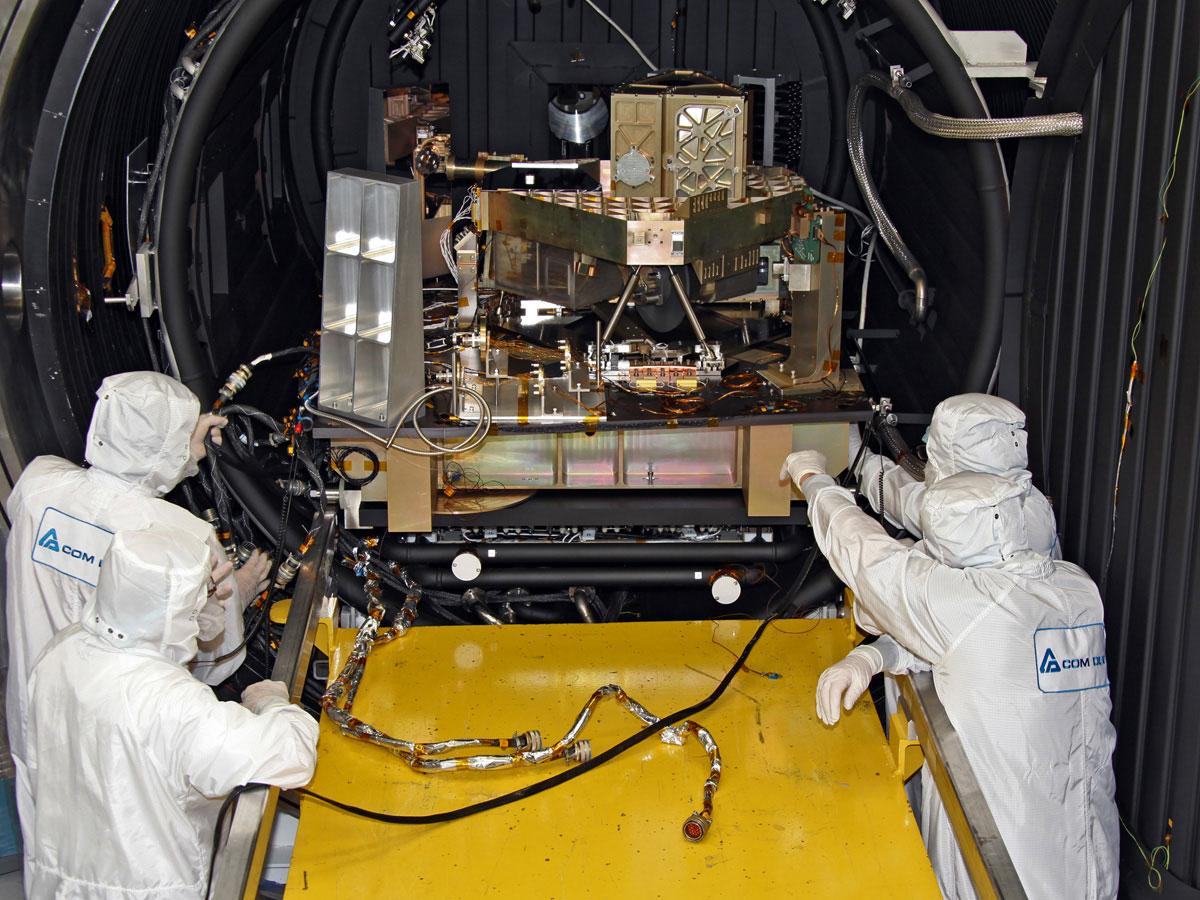
FGS Test unit undergoes cryogenic testing, 2012

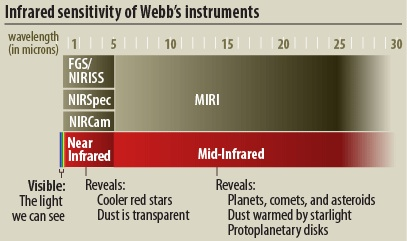
Infographic of JWST instruments and their observation ranges of light by wavelength

Fine Guidance Sensor and Near Infrared Imager and Slitless Spectrograph (FGS-NIRISS) is an instrument on the James Webb Space Telescope (JWST) that combines a Fine Guidance Sensor and a science instrument, a near-infrared imager and a spectrograph. The FGS/NIRISS was designed by the Canadian Space Agency (CSA) and built by Honeywell as part of an international project to build a large infrared space telescope with the National Aeronautics and Space Administration (NASA) and the European Space Agency (ESA). FGS-NIRISS observes light from the wavelengths of 0.8 to 5.0 microns. The instrument has four different observing modes.

Physically the FGS and NIRISS are combined, but optically they are separate with the FGS being used by the telescope to point it, whereas NIRISS is an independent science instrument. The spectroscopic mode is capable of doing exoplanet spectroscopy. The detector for NIRISS is a 2048 × 2048 pixel mercury cadmium telluride (HgCdTe) array, where each pixel is 18 microns on a side according to the STSCi. The field of view is 2.2' × 2.2' which gives a plate scale of about 0.065 arcsec/pixel.

The FGS will aid the telescope in focusing on its given observational target. The FGS provides correctional data to the JWST Attitude Control System (ACS) using guide stars as reference points.

NIRISS is designed for performing:

- Near-infrared imaging
- Wide-field slitless spectroscopy
- Single object slitless spectroscopy
- Aperture masking interferometry

The aperture masking interferometry mode uses a seven-hole aperture masking disc, and should allow the detection of exoplanets within certain ranges of light and types of stars.

The Engineering Test Unit of the FGS was delivered to NASA in 2010. The flight units were planned to be delivered later after the ETU, which enabled testing with other JWST hardware. The flight units of FGS/NIRISS were delivered to NASA in August 2012.

Commissioning is complete as of the following dates:

- Single object slitless spectroscopy, 06/22/2022
- Wide field slitless spectroscopy, 06/14/2022
- Aperture masking interferometry, 06/14/2022
- Imaging (parallel only), 06/08/2022

== FGS ==
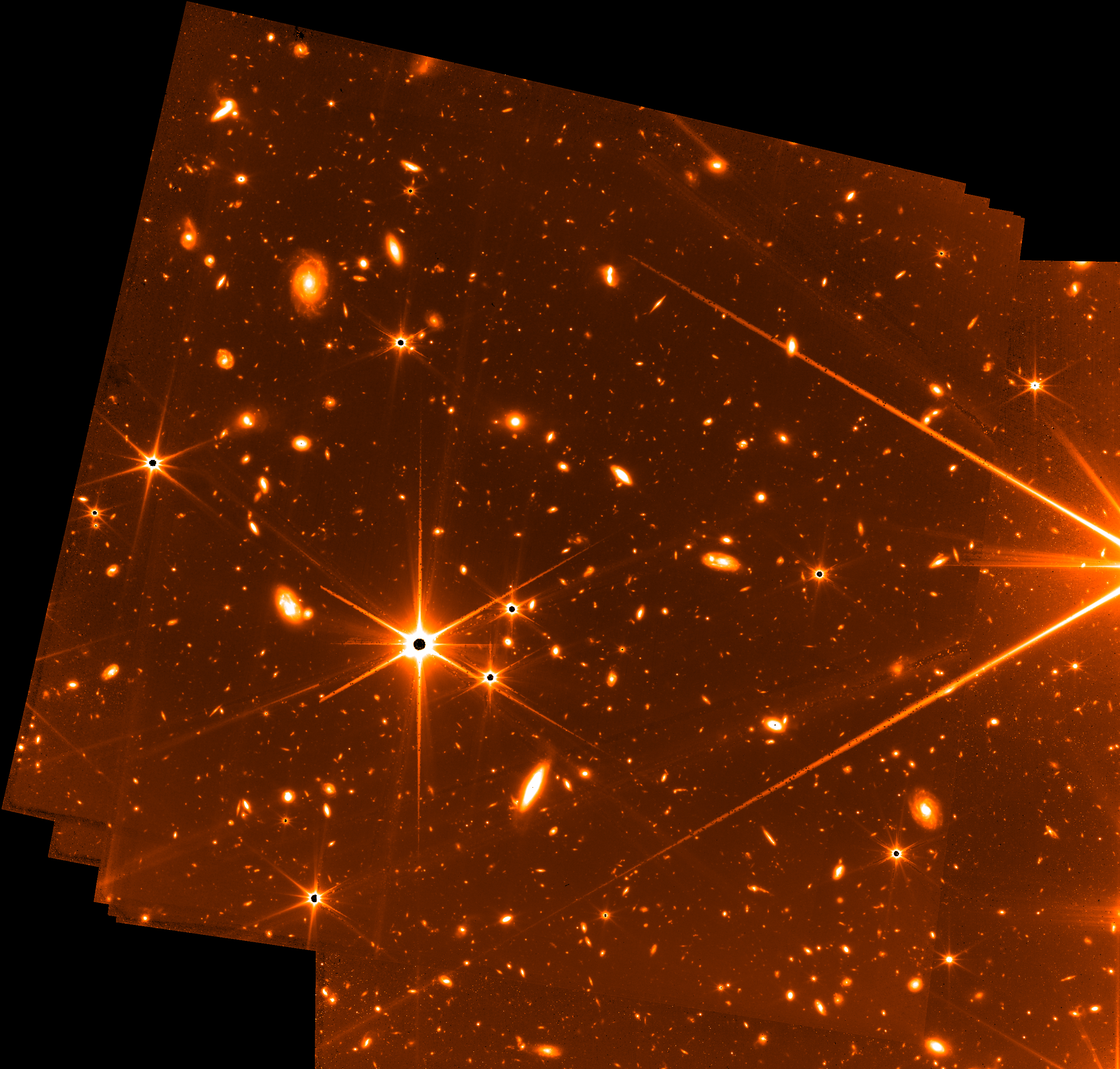
Image produced by the FGS.

The FGS functionality supports JWST pointing at the desired targets. The FGS is designed to find pre-selected guide stars, which allows the telescope to stay precisely pointed at the desired target. The actual pointing of the telescope is handled by other segments, especially the systems in the spacecraft bus and the fine guidance mirror in the Optical Telescope Element.

Unlike the Hubble Space Telescope's field guidance sensors, which can be used in astrometry such as studying exoplanets, the James Webb Space Telescope's field guidance sensors are not available for science proposals by researchers because they are used exclusively for guiding and calibration.

== Tuneable filter (cancelled) ==
Previously, CSA was working on a tuneable image filter. This device was intended to allow a narrow filter band to be selected (as opposed to a fixed filter band). The TFI was cancelled in 2011 and the work rolled-over into the NIRISS. The TFI would have a selectable filter band between 1.5–5 μm.

In July 2011 the Canadian Space Agency reluctantly discontinued work on the Tunable Filter Imager (TFI) when it became clear that issues associated with the cryogenic operation of its Fabry-Perot etalon were unlikely to be resolved in time to meet the instrument's delivery schedule...

— STSCI

A developmental version of the TFI was tested in Ontario, Canada in 2010. The chief problem was the time needed to resolve issues with cryogenic operation in time for the JWST launch. The TFI was re-configured to form the basis for the NIRISS instrument that is planned for flight on the space telescope.

== Labeled diagrams ==
Labeled diagrams

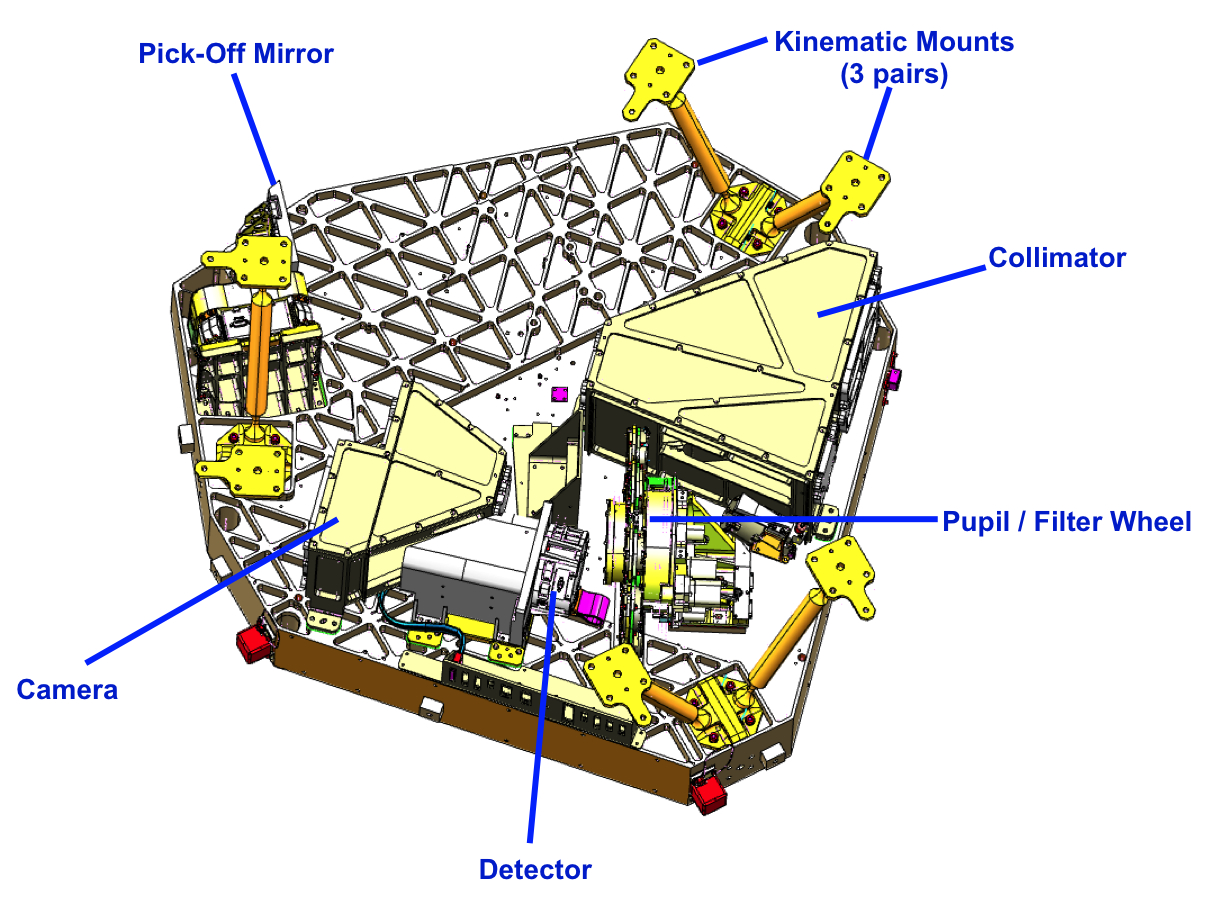
NIRISS

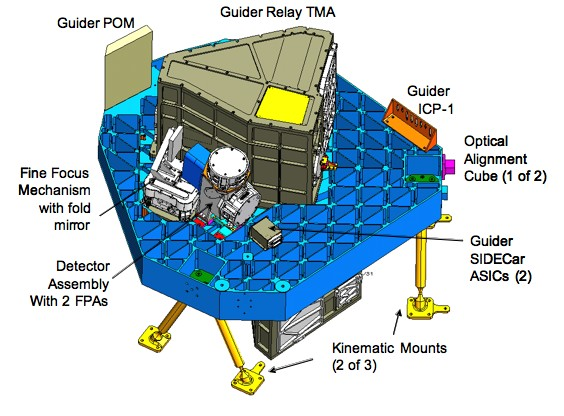
FGS/NIRISS

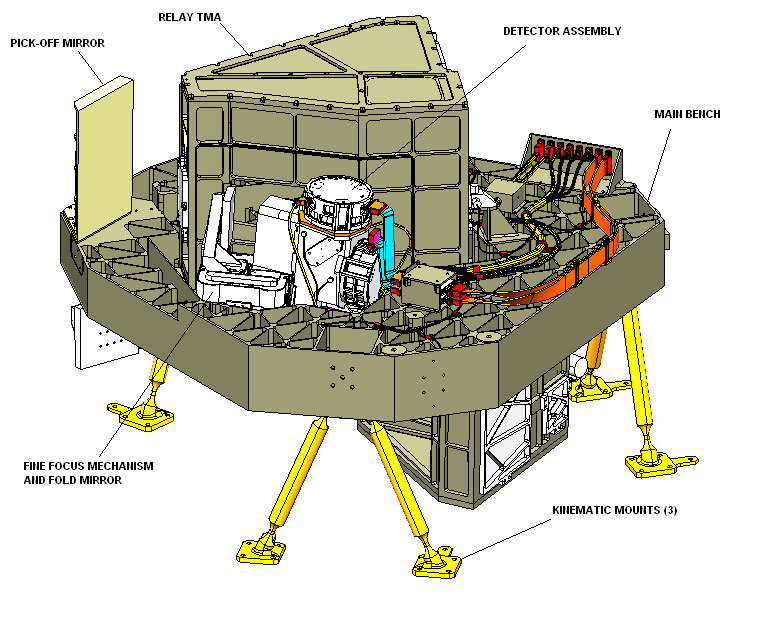
FGS/NIRISS

== Build team ==
Related institutions and the science team for the instrument includes:

- COM DEV
- National Research Council Canada
- Saint Mary's University
- Space Telescope Science Institute (STScI)
- Swiss Federal Institute of Technology Zurich (ETH Zurich)
- Université de Montréal
- York University
- University of Rochester
- Cornell University
- University of Toronto
- Mont Mégantic Observatory
- Trottier Institute for Research on Exoplanets (iRex)
- Centre de recherche en astrophysique du Québec (CRAQ)

Canada credits work on the FUSE (Far Ultraviolet Spectroscopic Explorer) as helping them prepare for making JWST FGS.

Begoña Vila has been the project's lead systems engineer since 2013.

== See also ==
- Fine guidance sensor
- Infrared Array Camera (Spitzer near to mid infrared camera)
- Integrated Science Instrument Module (Houses JWST's instruments)
- James Webb Space Telescope timeline
- MIRI (Mid-Infrared Instrument) (JWST's 5–28 micron camera/spectrograph)
- Optical Telescope Element (JWST's main mirror and optics, etc.)
- Slitless spectroscopy
