= Begoña Vila =

Spanish astrophysicist (born 1963)

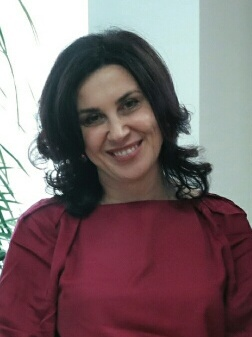
- Born: María Begoña Vila Costas; 1963 (age 62–63); Vigo, Spain
- Education: University of Manchester
- Occupations: Astrophysicist, systems engineer
- Employer: NASA
- Children: 3
- Awards: Exceptional Public Achievement Medal (2016 and 2022); María Josefa Wonenburger Planells Award (2017); Marca España Honorary Ambassador (2022); Doctor Honoris Causa from the University of Vigo (2025)

María Begoña Vila Costas (born 1963) is a Spanish astrophysicist specializing in the study of spiral galaxies. She currently resides in Washington, D.C. and works as a systems engineer at NASA's Goddard Space Flight Center. She is the lead engineer for the Fine Guidance Sensor and Near Infrared Imager and Slitless Spectrograph (FGS-NIRISS) on the James Webb Space Telescope – the Hubble's successor – in addition to being in charge of the final cold test of the group of instruments before their integration with the telescope. She is now working on the Nancy Grace Roman Space Telescope.

== Career ==
Begoña Vila studied Astrophysics at the University of Santiago de Compostela and the Canary Islands Institute of Astrophysics from 1981 to 1986. She received her doctorate in Astrophysics at the Jodrell Bank Centre for Astrophysics at the University of Manchester in 1989.

Beginning in 2006 she worked at a Canadian company under the direction of the Canadian Space Agency on the design and construction of the Fine Guidance Sensor and Near Infrared Imager and Slitless Spectrograph (FGS-NIRISS) currently carried by the James Webb Space Telescope. When it was delivered in 2012 and the first cold test was done, NASA decided to hire her through an external company as a systems engineer for the instrument.

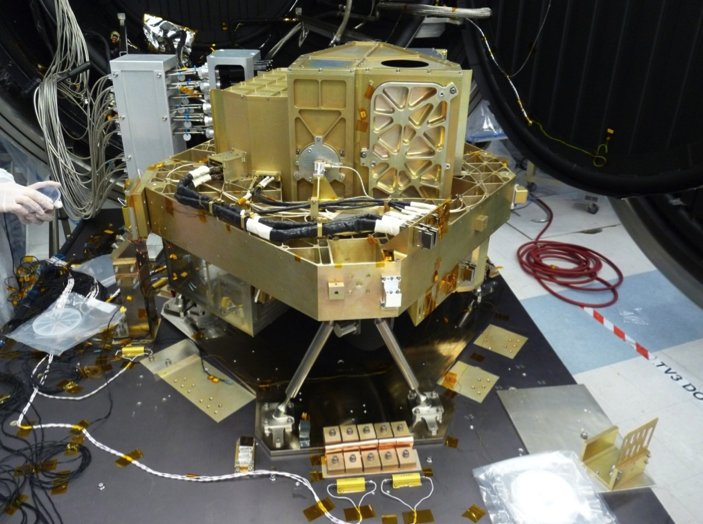
Vila is the lead engineer for the Fine Guidance Sensor and Near Infrared Imager and Slitless Spectrograph, pictured here in 2016.

Since 2013 she has been "FGS lead systems engineer", in charge of tests of the sensor, its operations in orbit, limitations, software components, etc. She also coordinates all the scientific instruments grouped in the Integrated Science Instrument Module (ISIM) for the cold tests.

She is a member of Españoles Científicos en USA (ECUSA-DC), an organization that encompasses the Spanish scientific community in Maryland, Virginia, and Washington, D.C.

In 2016, she was honored by NASA with the Exceptional Public Achievement Medal for her "years of outstanding leadership and achievement", as well as the design and development of the FGS-NIRISS.

In 2017 she won the María Josefa Wonenburger Planells Award for her scientific work.

In 2022 she was accredited by their Majesties the King and Queen of Spain as Spanish Honorary Ambassador of the Spain Brand (Marca España), an initiative of the Forum of Renowned Spanish Brands (FMRE), in the category of Science and Innovation.

In 2023, she received the NASA Exceptional Public Service Medal for years of public service to develop and commission JWST’s Fine Guidance Sensor providing pointing for this Observatory”.

In 2023 she was also included in the Forbes list of 100 most influential women in Spain.

In 2025 she was awarded an honorary doctorate by the University of Vigo.
