= Emil de Cou =

Emil Anthony de Cou
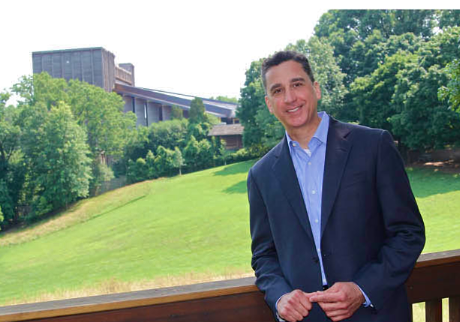
- Emil de Cou, Conductor

Background information
- Born: Emile Anthony Decou; Los Angeles, California
- Occupations: Conductor, arranger, writer
- Instruments: Horn, piano
- Years active: 1982 - present
- Website: emildecou.com

Emil de Cou is an American conductor who became associate conductor of the National Symphony Orchestra (John F. Kennedy Center for the Performing Arts) in September 2003. He has led the orchestra on residency tours in five states, in subscription concerts at the Kennedy Center and on the West Lawn of the United States Capitol Building. In 2005 de Cou was named NSO at Wolf Trap Festival Conductor and celebrated his 25th season with that organization in the summer of 2025. He was appointed the music director of the Pacific Northwest Ballet starting with the 2011-2012 season. In 2013, he was described by New York Times critic Alastair Macaulay to be "probably...America’s finest ballet conductor."

Emil de Cou also acts as musical advisor to NASA. In June, 2018 de Cou led performances at the Kennedy Center to commemorate the 60th anniversary of the founding of the space agency called "Space, the Next Frontier." This was the 12th collaboration between the National Symphony Orchestra and NASA.

De Cou is a resident of San Francisco where he was Principal Pops Conductor of the San Francisco Symphony and acting music director of the San Francisco Ballet Orchestra.

De Cou has recorded extensively including world premiere recordings of Claude Debussy's original version of Printemps Suite Symphonique, the orchestral version of Suite Bergamasque, Charles Griffes's The Kairn of Koridwen, and Elliot Goldenthal's Othello (ballet).

== Award ==
For his ongoing work with NASA, de Cou was awarded the NASA Exceptional Public Achievement Medal by Administrator Charles F. Bolden, Jr. at the NSO at Wolf Trap performance of The Planets in July 2012, the first musician to receive that honor.
