= Mid-Infrared Instrument =

Camera and spectrometer on the James Webb Space Telescope

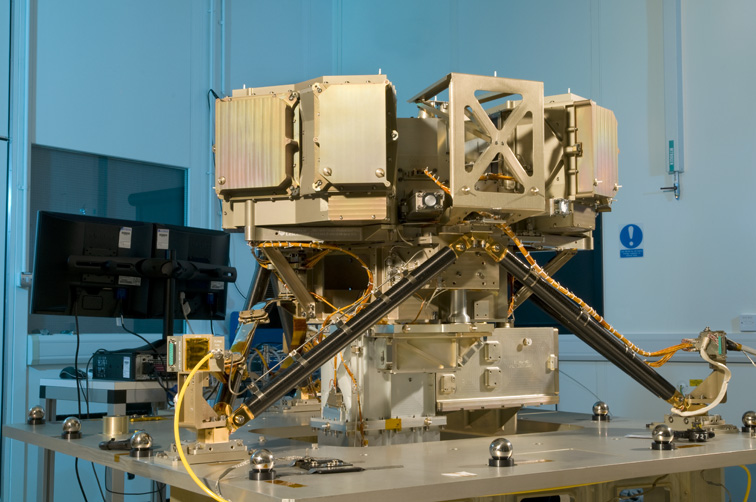
MIRI

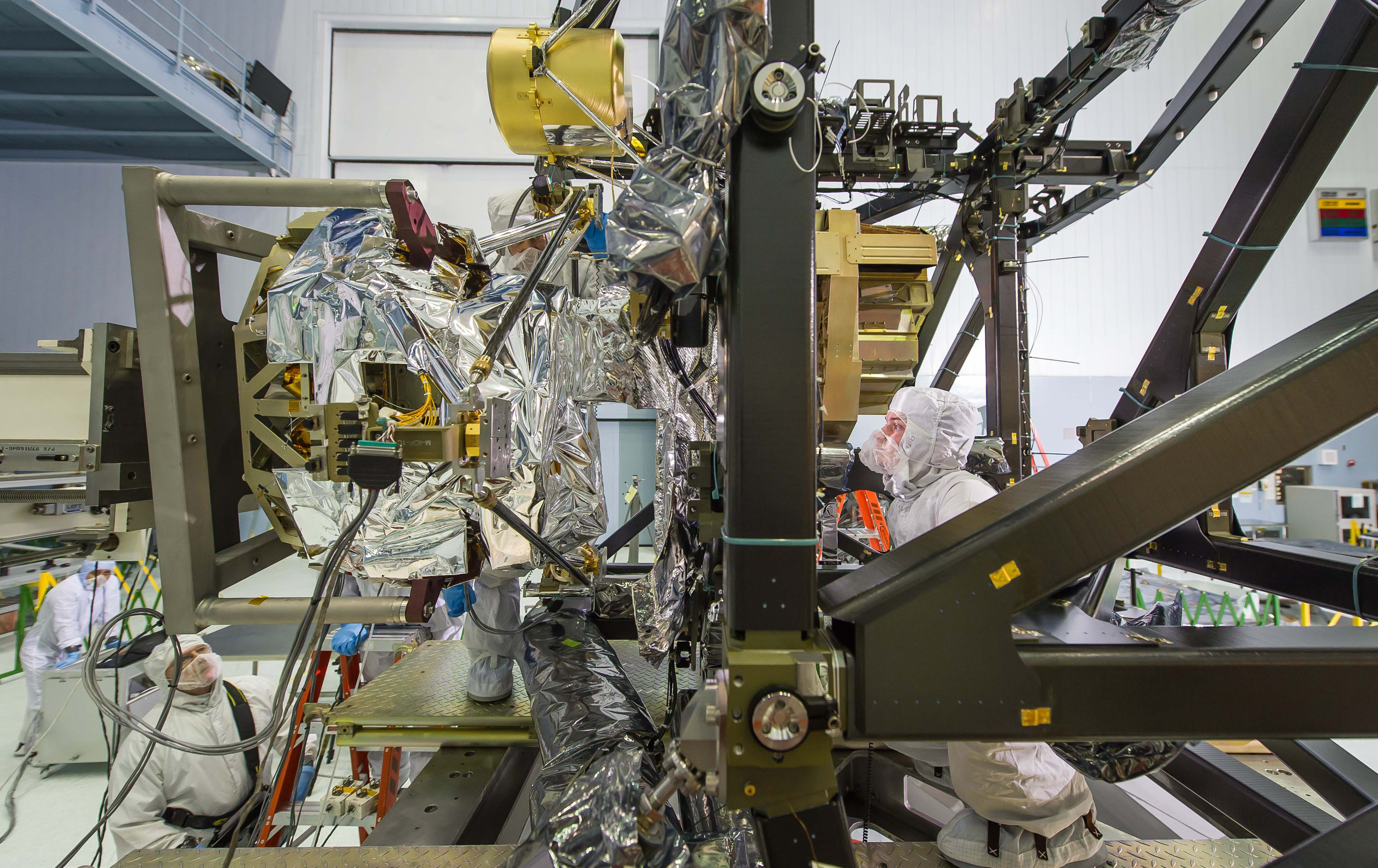
MIRI being integrated into ISIM, 2013

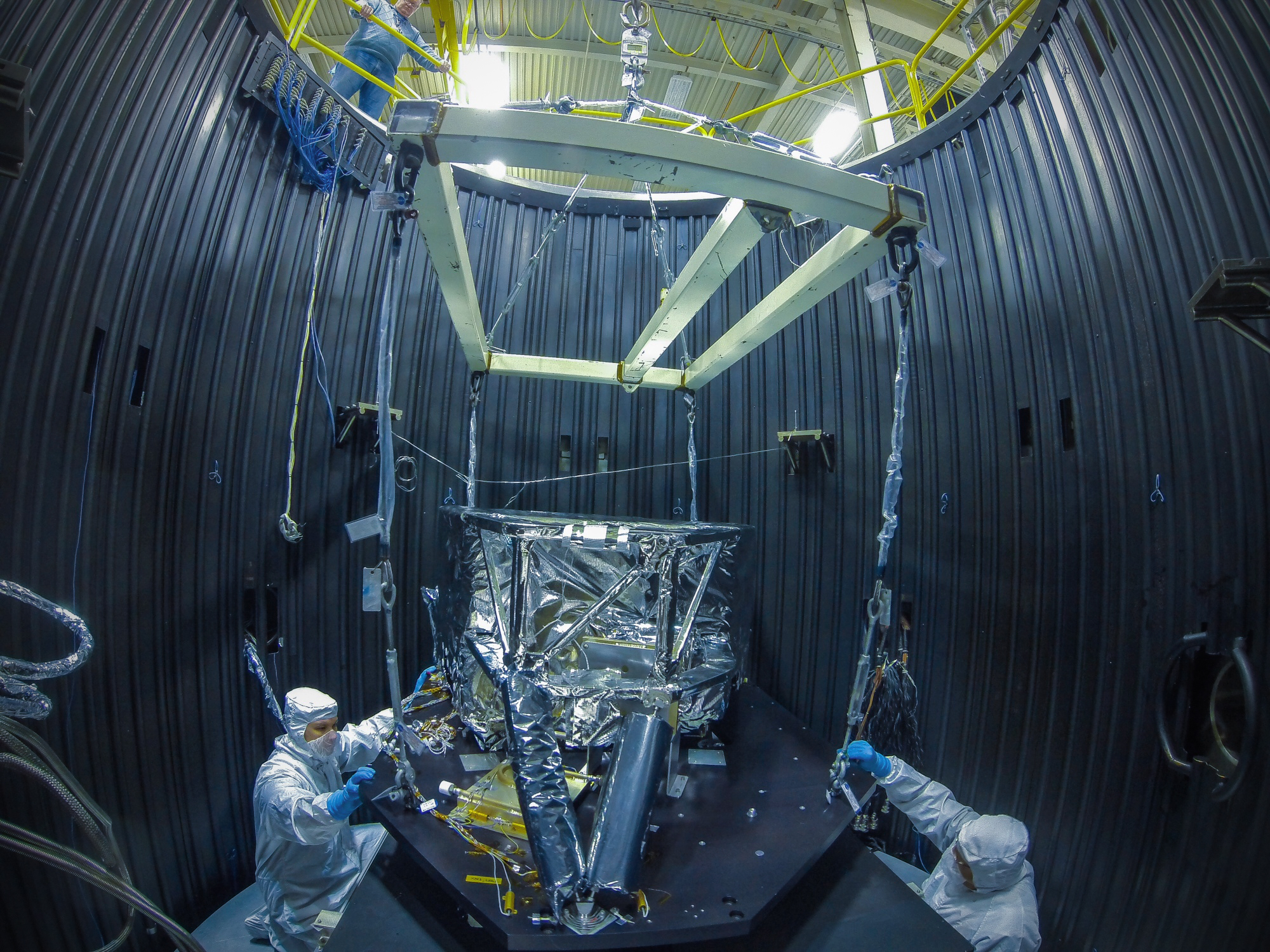
MIRI's cooling system being tested

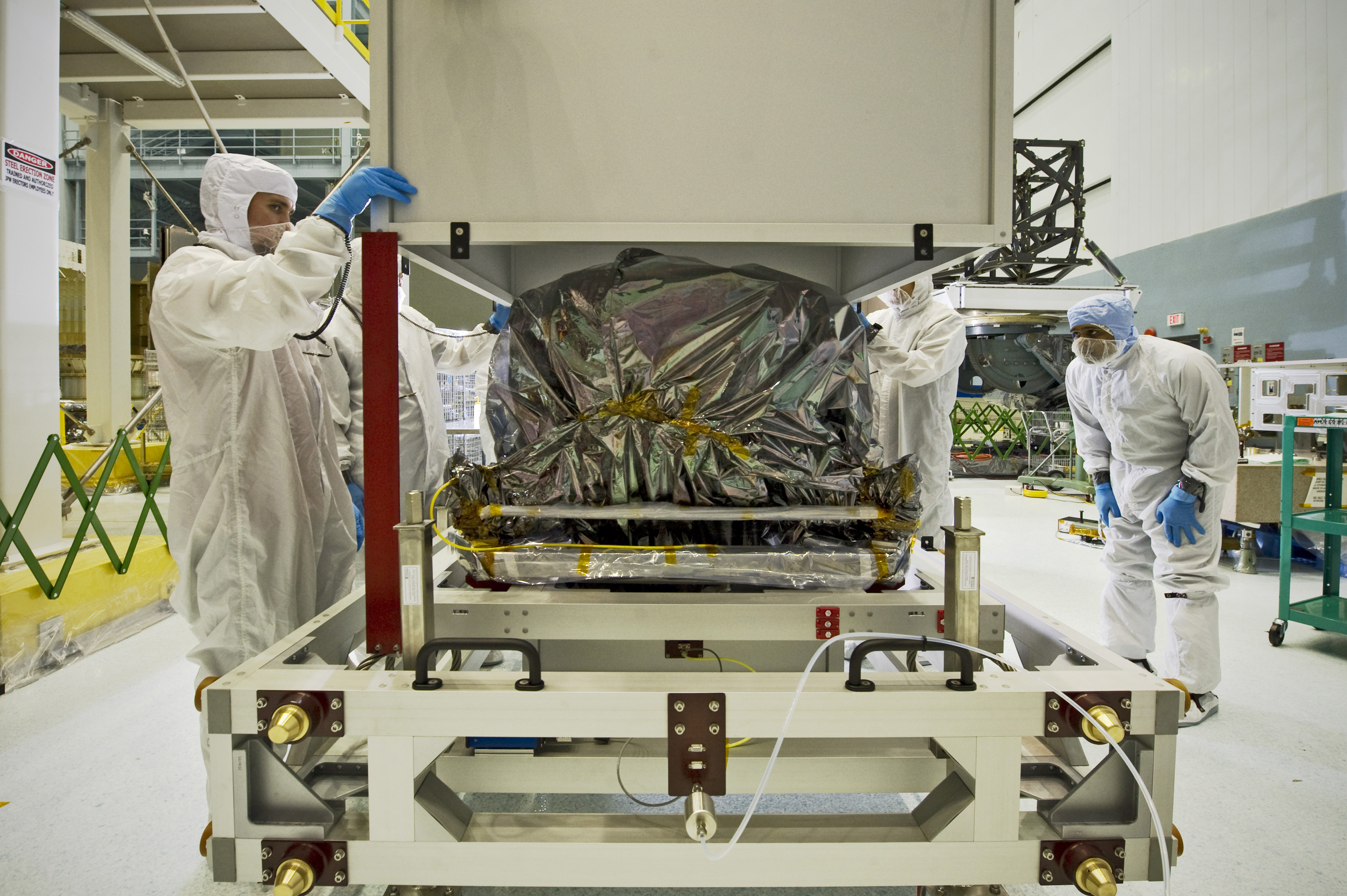
MIRI is uncrated at Goddard Space Flight Center, 2012

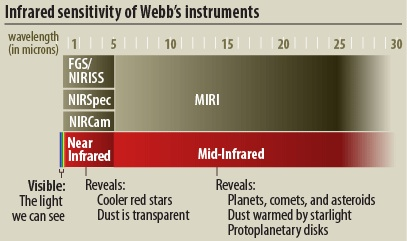
Infographic of James Webb Space Telescope instruments and their observation ranges of light by wavelength

MIRI, or the Mid-Infrared Instrument, is one of four science instruments on the James Webb Space Telescope. MIRI consists of two main modules: an Imager and a Spectrometer. It is sensitive from 5 to 28 micron. The Imager module also provides Coronagaphic imaging, low-resolution spectroscopy using a fixed slit, or in a slitless configuration. The Spectrometer module provides integral field spectroscopy with medium spectral resolving power. Its mid-infrared wavelength coverage sets it apart from the other 3 science instruments on the James Webb Space Telescope, which all observe in the near-infrared.

MIRI uses 1k x 1k-pixels silicon arrays doped with arsenic to record data at these wavelengths. The imager is designed for wide views but the spectrograph has a smaller view. Because of its longer-wavelength sensitivity, MIRI operates at colder temperatures than the rest of the observatory. It has an additional Helium-based cooling system. The MIRI cryocooler has a 2-stage design consisting of a pulse tube precooler and a Joule-Thomson loop heat exchanger. This allows MIRI to be cooled down to and operate at a temperature of 7 kelvin during operations in space.

MIRI was built by a 50/50 European/US partnership. In Europe, the MIRI European Consortium consisted of scientists and engineers from 10 different European countries (the United Kingdom, France, Belgium, the Netherlands, Germany, Spain, Switzerland, Sweden, Denmark, and Ireland), with the UK taking the lead role for development, assembly and testing. The European Consortium was headed by Prof. Gillian Wright, of the UK Astronomy Technology Centre in Edinburgh. The US team was led by Prof. George Rieke at the University of Arizona, with key hardware delivered by the Jet Propulsion Lab in California, and scientists from several U.S. institutions.

== Overview ==
The spectrograph can observe wavelengths between 4.6 and 28.6 microns, and it has four separate channels, each with its own gratings and image slicers. The field of view of the spectrograph is 3.5 by 3.5 arcseconds.

The spectrograph is capable of low-resolution spectroscopy (LRS) with or without a slit, as well as medium-resolution spectroscopy (MRS) taken with an integral field unit (IFU). This means that MRS with the IFU creates an image cube. Similar to other IFUs this can be compared to an image that has a spectrum for each pixel.

The imager has a plate scale of 0.11 arcseconds/pixel and a field of view of 74 by 113 arcseconds. Earlier in development the field of view was going to be 79 by 102 arcseconds (1.3 by 1.7 arcmin). The imaging channel has ten filters available and the detectors are made of arsenic-doped silicon (Si:As). The detectors (one for the imager, and two for the spectrometer) each have a resolution of 1024x1024 pixels, and they are called Focal Plane Modules or FPMs.

During 2013 and finishing in January 2014, MIRI was integrated into the Integrated Science Instrument Module (ISIM). MIRI successfully passed Cryo Vac 1 and Cryo Vac 2 tests as part of ISIM in the 2010s.

MIRI is attached to the ISIM by a carbon-fiber and plastic hexapod structure, which attaches it to the spacecraft but also helps thermally isolate it. (see also Carbon fiber reinforced plastic)

Parts summary:

- Spectrometer optics
  - Spectrometer Main Optics (SMO)
  - Spectrometer Pre Optics (SPO)
- Focal Plane Arrays
- Input-Optics Calibration Module (IOC)
  - Pick-off Mirror
  - Calibration source for Imager
  - Contamination Control Cover (CCC)
- CFRP hexapod
- Imager
- Image slicers
- Deck

Most of MIRI is located in the main ISIM structure, however the cryocooler is in region 3 of ISIM which is located in the spacecraft bus.

The imager module of MIRI also includes the Low Resolution Spectrometer that can perform long-slit and slitless spectroscopy from 5 to 12 μm light wavelength. The LRS uses Ge (germanium) and ZnS (zinc sulfide) prisms to cause spectroscopic dispersion.

Commissioning is complete as of the following dates:

- Imaging, 06/17/2022
- Low resolution spectroscopy, 06/24/2022
- Medium resolution spectroscopy, 06/24/2022
- Coronagraphic imaging, 06/29/2022

== Cryocooler ==
To allow mid-infrared observations within the JWST, the MIRI instrument has an additional cooling system. It works roughly similar to how most refrigerators or an air-conditioner works: a fluid is brought down to a cold temperature in the warm section, and sent back to the cold section where it absorbs heat, then it goes back to the condenser. One source of heat is the left-over heat of the spacecraft, but another is the spacecraft's own electronics, some of which are close to the actual instruments to process data from observations. Most of the electronics are in the much warmer spacecraft bus, but some of the electronics needed to be much closer, and great lengths were taken to reduce the heat they produce. By reducing how much heat the electronics make on the cold side, less heat needs to be removed.

In this case the JWST cryocooler resides in the spacecraft bus and it has lines of coolant that run to the MIRI instrument, chilling it. The cryocooler has a heat radiator on the spacecraft bus to emit the heat it collects. In this case the cooling system uses helium gas as the refrigerant.

The James Webb Space Telescope's cryocooler is based originally on the TRW ACTDP cryocooler. However, the JWST has had to develop a version to handle higher thermal loads. It has a multi-stage pulse tube refrigerator that chills an even more powerful cooler. That is a linear-motion Oxford-style compressor that powers a J-T loop. Its target is to cool the MIRI instrument down to 6 kelvins (−448.87 °F, or −267.15 °C). The ISIM is at about 40 K (due to the sunshield) and there is a dedicated MIRI radiation shield beyond which the temperature is 20 K. The J-T loop is a Joule–Thomson loop heat exchanger.

== Filters ==
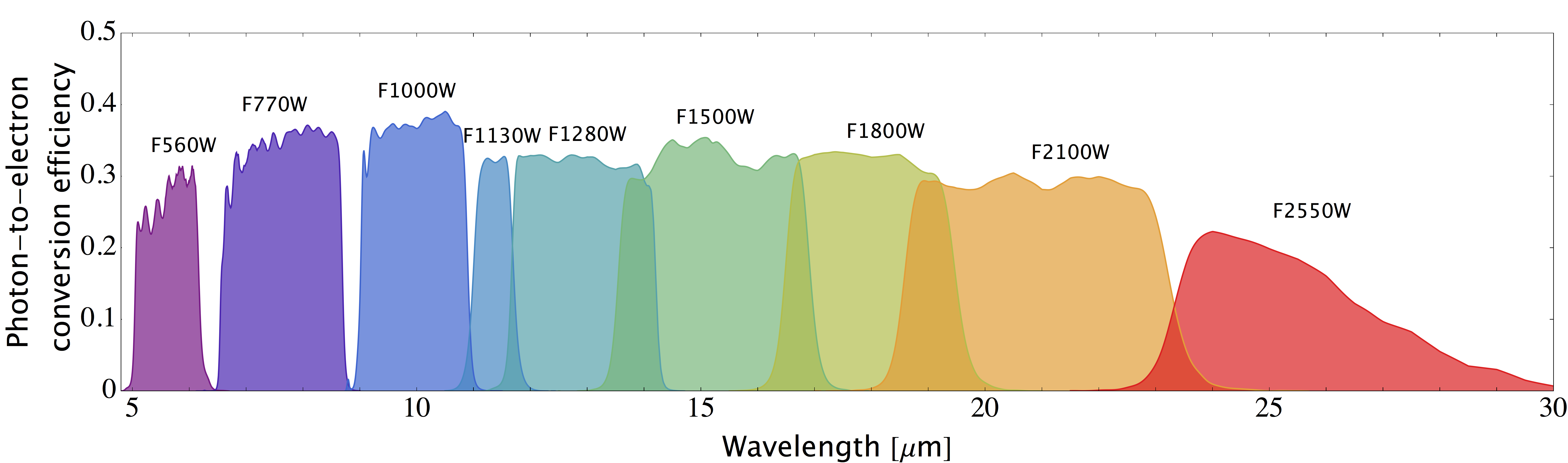
MIRI imaging filters

MIRI imaging has 10 filters available for observations.

- F560W - Broadband Imaging
- F770W - PAH, broadband imaging
- F1000W - Silicate, broadband imaging
- F1130W - PAH, broadband imaging
- F1280W - Broadband imaging
- F1500W - Broadband imaging
- F1800W - Silicate, broadband imaging
- F2100W - Broadband imaging
- F2550W - Broadband imaging
- F2550WR - Redundant filter, risk reduction
- FND - For bright target acquisition
- Opaque - Darks

MIRI Coronagraphic imaging has 4 filters available for observations.

- F1065C - useful for ammonia and silicates
- F1140C
- F1550C
- F2300C

The low-resolution spectrometer (LRS) uses a double zinc sulfide/germanium (ZnS/Ge) prism. The slit mask has a filter that blocks light with a wavelength shorter than 4.5 μm. LRS covers 5 to 14 μm.

The medium-resolution spectrometer (MRS) has 4 channels that are observed simultaneously. Each channel is however further divided into 3 different spectral settings (called short, medium and long). In one observation MIRI can only observe one of those three settings. An observation that aims to observe the entire spectrum has to carry out 3 separate observations of the individual settings. MRS covers 4.9 to 27.9 μm.

== Diagrams ==
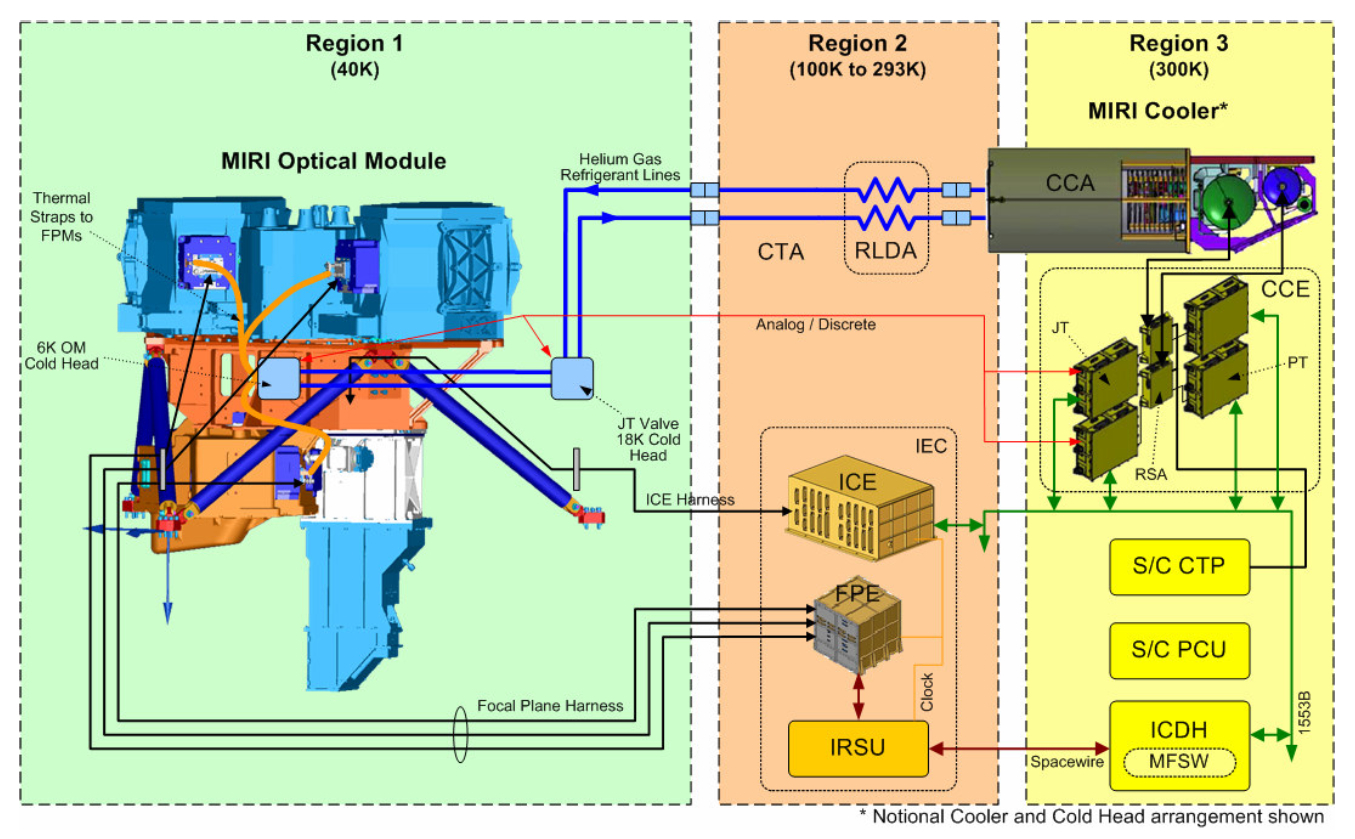
Diagram of MIRI and its cooler, showing the connections between the different systems related to their location.
Region 3 is inside the spacecraft bus of JWST

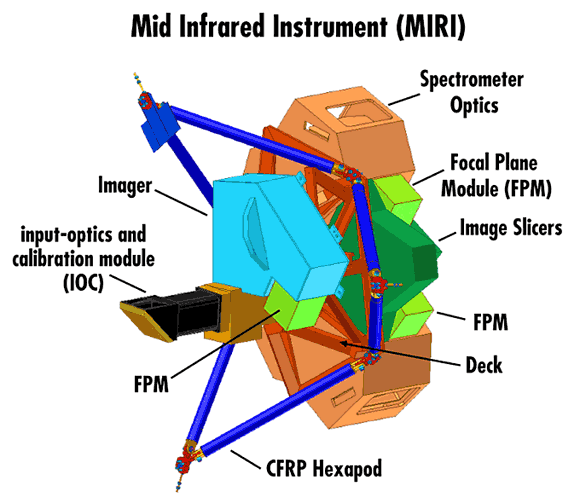
Color-coded and labeled diagram of the MIRI instrument without cryocooler

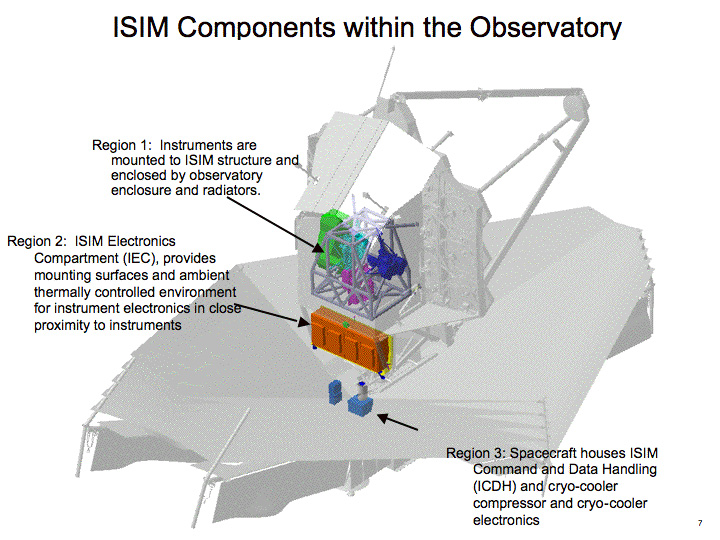
Diagram highlighting ISIM, which shows the location of the MIRI cryocooler (color-code blue in ISIM Region 3) in the spacecraft bus, on the other side of the heat shield from the instrument.

== See also ==
- Spitzer Space Telescope (NASA's mid-infrared space telescope launched in 2003, it could not see as deep into the infrared when its coolant supply was depleted in 2009)
- Wide-field Infrared Survey Explorer (infrared survey telescope)
- List of largest infrared telescopes (includes examples of space observatories that have designed for similar wavelengths)
- Jovian Infrared Auroral Mapper (IR Imaging spectrometer on Juno Jupiter orbiter)
- Infrared Array Camera (Spitzer near to mid infrared camera)
