= Exceptional Public Achievement Medal =

NASA Exceptional Public Achievement Medal
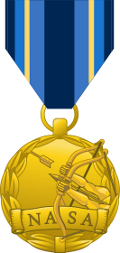
- Type: Medal
- Awarded for: "Awarded to any non-Government individual or to any individual who was not a Government employee during the period in which the service was performed. The award is for a significant specific achievement or substantial improvement in operations, efficiency, service, financial savings, science, or technology which contributes to the mission of NASA."
- Country: United States
- Presented by: the National Aeronautics and Space Administration
- Eligibility: Non-government personnel
- Status: Active
- Established: July 29, 1959
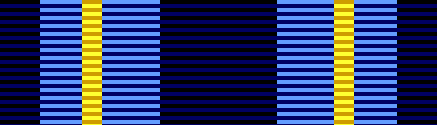
- NASA Exceptional Public Achievement Ribbon

The Exceptional Public Achievement Medal is an award of the National Aeronautics and Space Administration (NASA) established in 1959. It is awarded to any non-Government individual or to any individual who was not a Government employee during the period in which the service was performed. The award is for a significant specific achievement or substantial improvement in operations, efficiency, service, financial savings, science, or technology which contributes to the mission of NASA.

To be awarded the medal, a NASA employee must fulfill the following criteria: work-related achievements yielding high-quality results and/or substantial improvement that supports the Agency mission; innovative approaches used in the conception, design, or execution of the individual's work; and/or impact and importance of the individual's achievement that made a significant contribution that enables NASA to accomplish its mission.

== Notable recipients ==
- National Symphony Conductor Emil de Cou (2012)
- June Lockhart (2013)
- Bill Prady (2013)
- Stephen Colbert (2015)
- Sir Ridley Scott (2016)
- Begoña Vila (2016)
- Charles M. Schulz (2023)

== See also ==
- List of NASA awards
