= Plate scale =

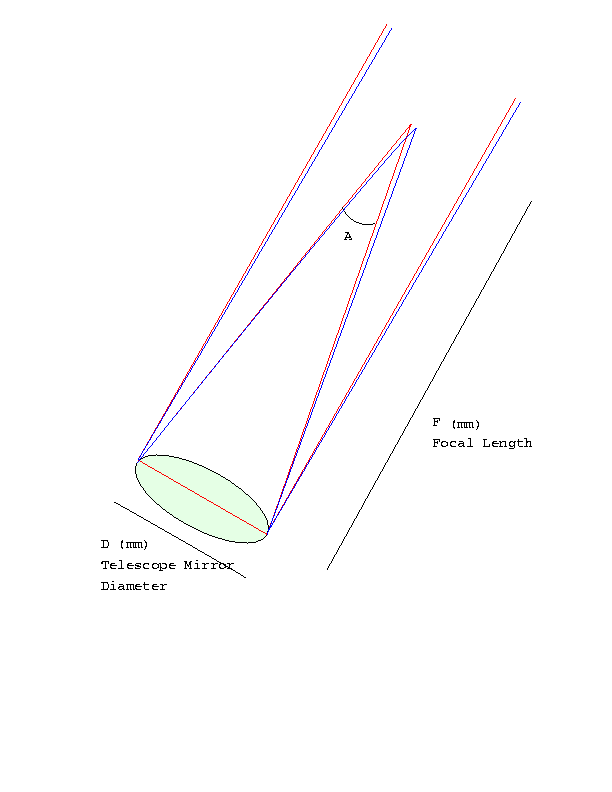
Plate scale can be derived using this image assuming that the angle is very small (so that tan(theta) is approximately theta).

The plate scale of a telescope connects the angular separation of an object with the linear separation of its image at the focal plane.

If focal length f is measured in millimeters, the plate scale in radians per millimeter is given by angular separation θ, and the linear separation of the image at the focal plane s, or by simply the focal length f:
$$p =\frac{\theta}{s} =\frac{1}{f}\ ,$$
since
$$s =f \theta\ .$$

Plate scale is usually expressed in arcseconds per millimeter:
$$p \approx\frac{206265}{f},$$
where f is in mm, or expressed in arcseconds per pixel after further division through the pixel scale.

== Plate scale on JWST FGS/NIRISS ==
The pixel scale of the James Webb Space Telescope component Fine Guidance Sensor and Near Infrared Imager and Slitless Spectrograph is about 0.066 arcsec/pixel. It uses a 2040 × 2040 pixel array with a pixel size of 18 microns per side with a field of view of 2.2′ × 2.2′

== See also ==
- Photographic plate
