= Spacecraft bus (James Webb Space Telescope) =

Part of the James Webb Space Telescope

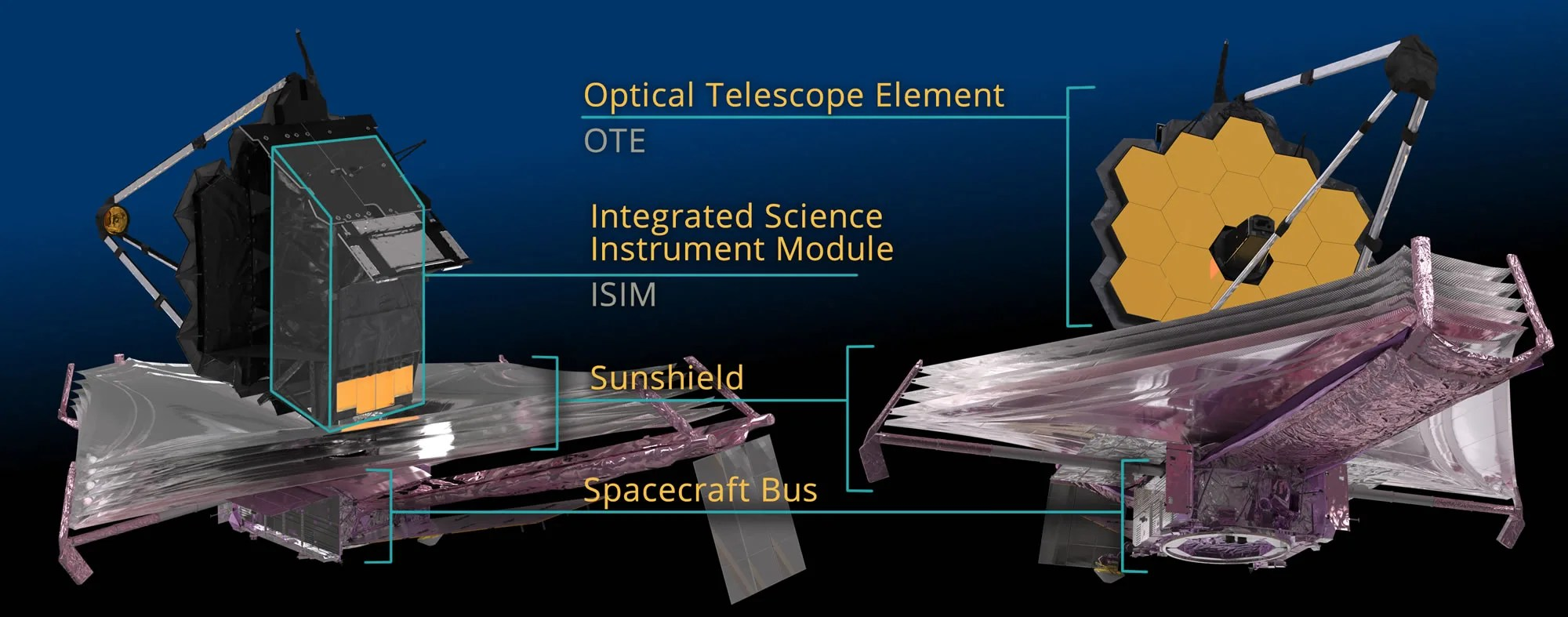
JWST major components: spacecraft bus, sunshield, Optical Telescope Element (OTE) and the Integrated Science Instrument Module (ISIM)

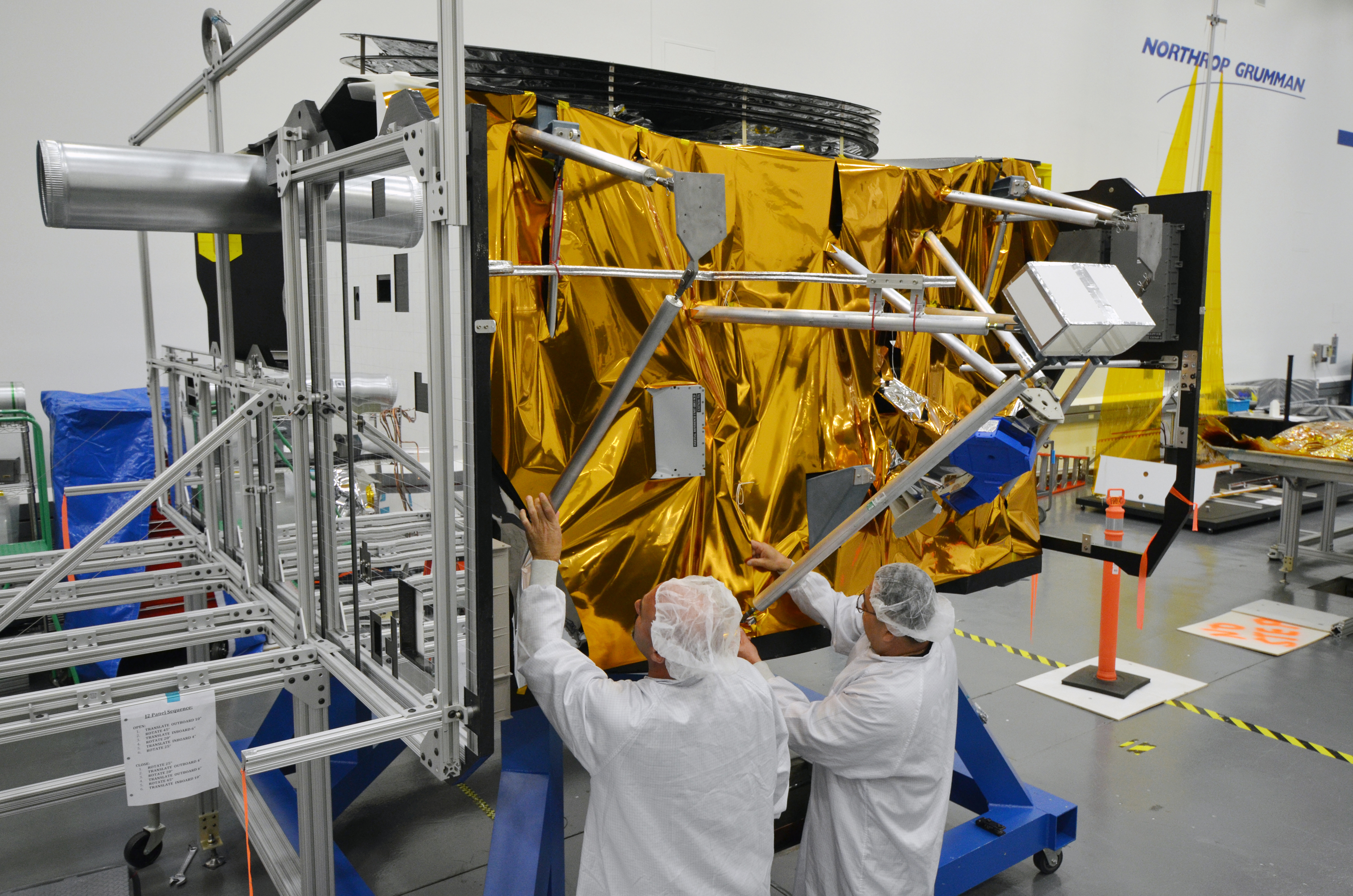
Technicians work on a mock-up of the JWST spacecraft bus in 2014

The spacecraft bus is a carbon fibre box that houses systems of the telescope and so is the primary support element of the James Webb Space Telescope, launched on 25 December 2021. It hosts a multitude of computing, communication, propulsion, and structural components. The other three elements of the JWST are the Optical Telescope Element (OTE), the Integrated Science Instrument Module (ISIM), and the sunshield. Region 3 of ISIM is also inside the spacecraft bus. Region 3 includes the ISIM Command and Data Handling subsystem and the Mid-Infrared Instrument (MIRI) cryocooler.

The spacecraft bus must structurally support the 6.5 ton space telescope, while weighing only 350 kg (770 lb). It is made primarily of graphite composite material. It was assembled by Northrop Grumman in Redondo Beach, California by 2015, and then it had to be integrated with the rest of the space telescope leading up to its planned 2018 launch. The bus can provide pointing precision of one arcsecond (1/3600°) and isolates vibration down to two milliarcseconds. The fine pointing is done by the JWST fine guidance mirror, obviating the need to physically move the whole mirror or bus.

The spacecraft bus is on the Sun-facing "warm" side and operates at a temperature of about 300 kelvins (80 °F, 27 °C). Everything on the Sun-facing side must be able to handle the thermal conditions of JWST's halo orbit, which has one side of continuous sunlight and the other shaded by the spacecraft sunshield.

Another important aspect of the spacecraft bus is the central computing, memory storage, and communications equipment. The processor and software direct data to and from the instruments, to the solid-state memory core, and to the radio system which can send data back to Earth and receive commands. The computer also controls the pointing and movement of the spacecraft, taking in sensor data from the gyroscopes and star tracker, and sending the necessary commands to the reaction wheels or thrusters.

== Overview ==
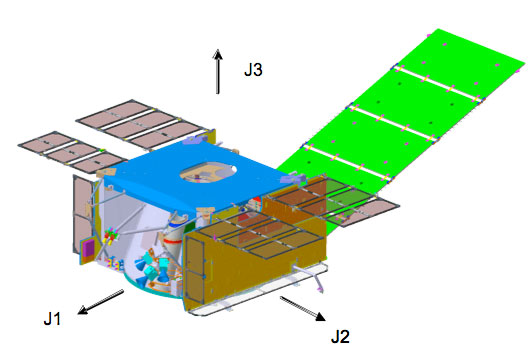
Diagram of the spacecraft bus. The solar panel is in green and the light purple flats are radiators shades.

The bus is a carbon fibre box that houses a large number of major systems that keep the telescope functioning, such as the solar panels and computers. It also contains the MIRI cooler and some ISIM electronics.

There are six major subsystems in the spacecraft bus:

- Electrical Power Subsystem
- Attitude Control Subsystem
- Communication Subsystem
- Command and Data Handling Subsystem (C&DH)
  - Command Telemetry Processor
  - Solid State Recorder (SSR)
- Propulsion Subsystem
- Thermal Control Subsystem

The spacecraft bus has three star trackers (plus one for redundancy), six reaction wheels, and the propulsion systems (fuel tank and thrusters). Two major tasks are pointing the telescope and performing station keeping for its metastable L2 halo orbit.

=== Command and Data Handling (C&DH) ===
The Command and Data Handling system includes a computer, the Command Telemetry Processor (CTP), and a data storage unit, the Solid State Recorder (SSR), with a capacity of 58.9 GB.

=== Communications ===
The communications dish which can point at Earth is attached to the bus. There is Ka-band and S-band radio communication. The Common Command and Telemetry System is based on Raytheon ECLIPSE system. The system is designed to communicate with NASA's Deep Space Communication Network. The main Science and Operations Center is the Space Telescope Science Institute in the U.S. state of Maryland.

=== Rocket engines, attitude control ===
The JWST uses two types of thrusters. The Secondary Combustion Augmented Thrusters (SCAT) use hydrazine (N_{2}H_{4}) and the oxidizer dinitrogen tetroxide (N_{2}O_{4}) as propellants. There are four SCATs in two pairs. One pair is used to propel the JWST into orbit, and the other performs station keeping in orbit. There are also eight Monopropellant Rocket Engines (MRE-1), so called because they use only hydrazine as fuel. They are used for attitude control and momentum unloading of the reaction wheels.

JWST has six reaction wheels for attitude control, spinning wheels that allow the orientation to be changed without using propellant to change momentum.

Finally, there are two titanium helium tanks to provide unregulated pressurant for all propellants.

To detect changes in direction JWST uses hemispherical resonator gyroscopes (HRG). HRGs are expected to be more reliable than the gas-bearing gyroscopes that were a reliability issue on Hubble Space Telescope. They cannot point as finely, however, which is overcome by the JWST fine guidance mirror.

=== Thermal ===
Thermal systems on the bus include the Deployable Radiator Shade Assemblies. There are two, one vertical (DRSA-V) and one horizontal (DRSA-H), for vertical and horizontal respectively (with respect to the coordinate system of the spacecraft bus). The membrane that makes up the DRSA is a coated Kapton membrane. Other thermal elements on the outside include a small radiator for the battery. There is also a narrow lower-fixed radiator shade, also made of coated Kapton membrane. The coating of the membrane is silicon and VPA. Other areas of the outside are covered with JWST multi-layer insulation (MLI).

=== Electrical Power Subsystem (EPS) ===
The Electrical Power Subsystem provides electricity to the JWST spacecraft. It consists of a set of one solar array divided into 5 solar panels divided and rechargeable batteries, a solar array regulator (SAR), a power control unit (PCU), and a telemetry acquisition unit (TAU).

The solar panels convert sunlight directly into electricity. This raw power is fed to the SAR which consists of four redundant buck converters each operating with a maximum-power point tracking (MPPT) algorithm. While the output voltage is not tightly regulated, the buck converters will not allow the spacecraft main bus voltage to drop below about 22 volts, or rise above about 35 volts. With every science instrument and all support circuits "on" simultaneously, approximately three of the four redundant converters could handle all of the power required. Typically one or two converters need be operating at a time with the other two on active standby.

The Power Control Unit (PCU) consists mainly of electronic switches that turn each science instrument or support device on or off under control of the central computer. Each switch allows power to flow to its selected instrument from the SAR. Communications with the central computer is via a 1553 bus. In addition to the power switches, processors for the SAR MPPT algorithm are located in the PCU, along with some telemetry processors, processors to detect when the spacecraft has disconnected from the launch upper stage, and some cryo-cooler controllers.

The Telemetry Acquisition Unit (TAU) consists of electronic switches for various heaters for the "warm" sides of the telescope. In addition, there are switches for the deployment actuators, and the bulk of the telemetry processors (e.g. measuring temperatures, electric power, fuel levels, etc.). The TAU communicates with the central computer via 1553 bus.

Both the PCU and TAU contain completely redundant systems with one active while the other is in standby mode or off, completely. The rechargeable batteries of JWST are the lithium-ion type. The batteries use the Sony 18650 hard carbon cell technology. The batteries are designed to endure spaceflight, and should sustain 18,000 charge-discharge cycles. Each solar panel structure support is honey-comb carbon fiber composite.

Some early configurations of the bus had two solar panel wings, one on each side. Part of the JWST program design was to allow different design variations to "compete" with each other.

=== Structure ===
Although the bus was primarily designed to operate in the weightless environment of outer space, during launch it must survive the equivalent of 45 tons. The structure can support 64 times its own weight.

The spacecraft structure provides state of the art capabilities to support the James Webb Space Telescope's first light mission.

— A Webb Telescope spacecraft manager as quoted by Composites World

The spacecraft bus is connected to the Optical Telescope Element and sunshield via the Deployable Tower Assembly. The interface to the launch vehicle in on outside; taking the form of a cone, it along with the payload adapter transmits the weight and acceleration forces outward launch vehicle walls.

The structure of the bus walls are made of carbon fiber composite and graphite composite.

The bus is 3,508 mm (11.509 ft) long without the solar arrays. From one edge of an extended radiator shade to another it is 6,775 mm (22.228 ft); this includes the length of the two two-meter-wide radiator shades. The tail-dragger solar array is 5,900 mm (19.4 ft) but it is normally at an angle of 20° towards the sunshield. The array is in front of the sunshield segments shield deployment boom, which at the end of it also has a trim tab attached.

The bus structure itself weighs 350 kg (770 lb).

Once JWST was launched, the bus began to unfold and extend to its operating configuration. The plan was that during its first week of operation, the deployable tower would extend, which would separate the bus from the upper spacecraft by about 2 meters.

== Testing ==
A software simulation of the Solid-State Recorder was developed for testing purposes, which supports the overall software simulation of JWST. This is called the JWST Integrated Simulation and Test (JIST) Solid State Recorder (SSR) Simulator, and was used to test flight software with SpaceWire and MIL-STD-1553 communication, as it relates to the SSR. An Excalibur 1002 Single Board Computer ran the test software. The SSR test software an extension of the JIST software which is called JWST Integrated Simulation and Test core (JIST). JIST brings together software simulations of JWST hardware with actual JWST software, to allow virtual testing. The simulated SSR was created to support making a software test version of the JWST, to help validate and test the flight software for the telescope. In other words, rather than using an actual test hardware version of the SSR, there is a software program that simulates how the SSR works, which runs on another piece of hardware.

The SSR is part of the Command and Data Handling Subsystem.

== Construction ==
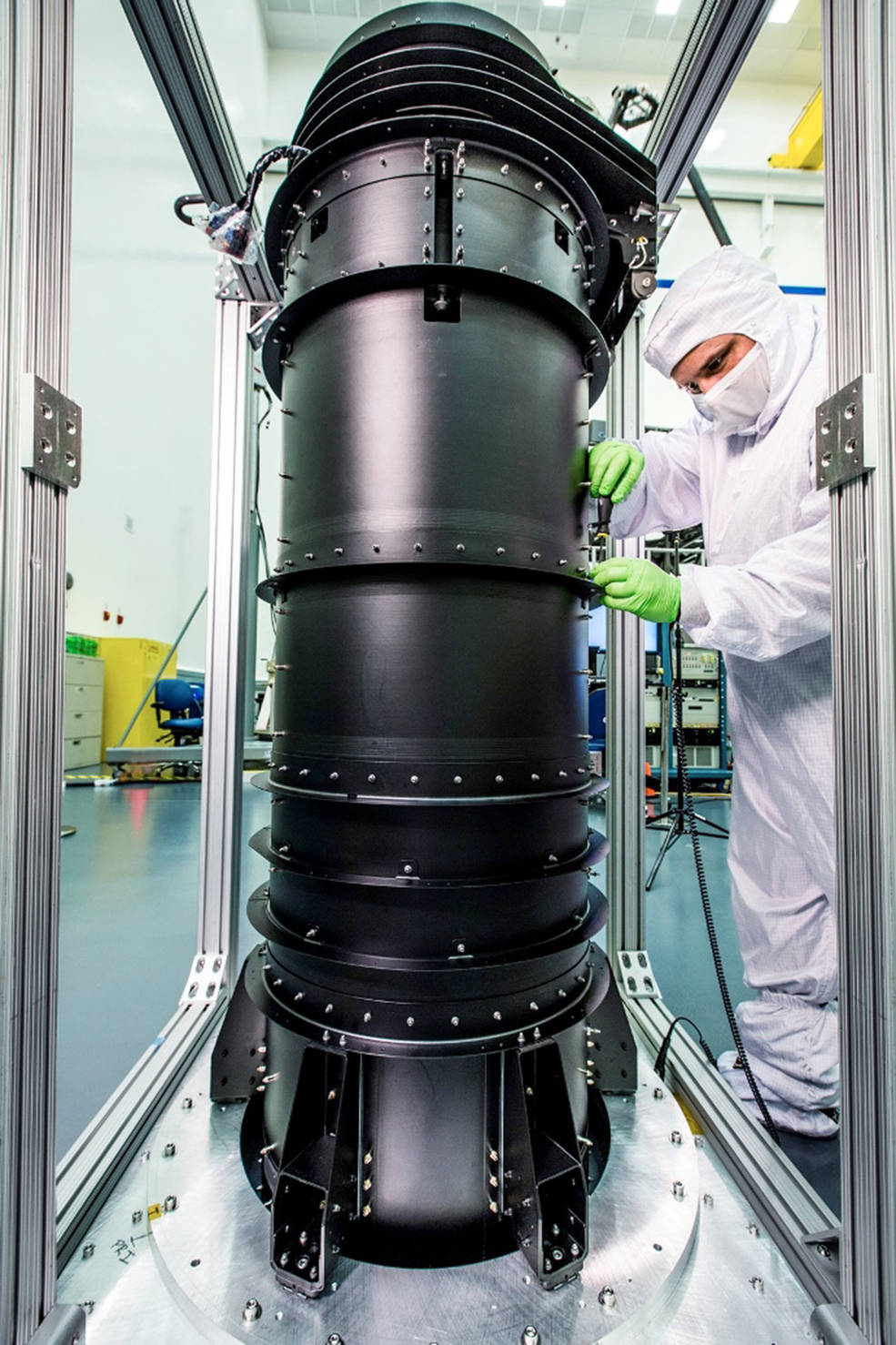
The Deployable Tower Assembly (DTA) is where the spacecraft bus connects to Optical Telescope Element. When it extends, it moves the bus farther away from the main mirror, creating a space for the sunshield layers.

The spacecraft element is made by Northrop Grumman Aerospace Systems. The sunshield and Bus are planned to be integrated in 2017.

In 2014, Northrop Grumman began construction of several spacecraft bus components including the gyroscopes, fuel tanks, and solar panels. On May 25, 2016, the spacecraft's panel integration was completed. The overall spacecraft bus structure was completed by October 2015. The spacecraft bus was assembled at facilities in Redondo Beach, California in the United States. The completed spacecraft bus was powered on for first time in early 2016.

The solar arrays completed a preliminary design audit in 2012, moving to the detailed design phase. Fuel and oxidizer tanks were shipped out to assembly in September 2015.

In 2015, the communications subsystems, star trackers, reaction wheels, fine Sun sensors, deployment electronics Unit, command telemetry processors, and wire harnesses were delivered for construction.

From 2016 to 2018, there are installations and tests for the telescope and the telescope plus the instruments, followed by shipping to NASA's Johnson Space Center in Houston, Texas where end-to-end optical testing in a simulated cryo-temperature and vacuum space environment will occur... Then all the parts will be shipped to Northrop Grumman for final assembly and testing, then to French Guiana for launch.

— Paul Geithner, Webb telescope manager - Technical, at NASA Goddard

The spacecraft bus will be assembled with the Spacecraft Element and the other parts in California.

For launch, the spacecraft bus is attached to the Ariane 5 on a Cone 3936 plus ACU 2624 lower cylinder and clamp-band. It is a contained launch fairing, 4.57 meters (15 ft) and 16.19 meters (53.1 ft) of usable interior size.

== Gyroscopes ==
There are two main traditional uses for gyroscopes in a spacecraft: to detect changes in orientation, and to actually change the orientation.

JWST uses a type of gyroscope known as a hemispherical resonator gyroscope (HRG). This design has no bearings, rubbing parts, or flexible connections. This is not a traditional mechanical gyroscope; instead, an HRG has a quartz hemisphere that vibrates at its resonant frequency in a vacuum. Electrodes detect changes if the spacecraft moves to collect the desired information on orientation.

The design is predicted to have a mean time before failure of 10 million hours. Gyroscopes failed on several occasions on the Hubble Space Telescope and had to be replaced several times. However, these were a different design called a gas-bearing gyroscope, which have certain benefits but experienced some long-term reliability issues. JWST will have six gyroscopes, but only two are required for pointing. JWST does not need as precise pointing because it has a Fine Steering Mirror that helps counter small motions of the telescope.

The JWST telescope also has spinning reaction wheels, which can be adjusted to point the telescope without using propellant, as well as a set of small thrusters that can physically change the attitude of the telescope.

The HRG are sensors that provide information, while the reaction wheels and thrusters are devices that physically change the orientation of the spacecraft. Together they work to keep the telescope in the right orbit and pointed in the desired direction.

== Integration ==
The spacecraft bus was integrated into the James Webb Space Telescope during construction. The spacecraft bus and the Sunshield segment are combined into what's called the Spacecraft Element, which is in turn combined with a combined structure of the Optical Telescope Element and Integrated Science Instrument Module called OTIS. That is the whole observatory, which is mounted to a cone which connects the JWST to the last stage of the Ariane 5 rocket. The spacecraft bus is where that cone connects to the rest of JWST.

== See also ==
- Satellite bus
- Timeline of the James Webb Space Telescope
- Attitude control
- Spacecraft design
  - Spacecraft thermal control
- Solar panels on spacecraft
- On-board data handling
