= List of quasars =

List of galactic nuclei

This article contains lists of quasars. More than a million quasars have been observed, so any list on Wikipedia is necessarily a selection of them.

Proper naming of quasars is by Catalogue Entry, Qxxxx±yy using B1950 coordinates, or QSO Jxxxx±yyyy using J2000 coordinates. They may also use the prefix QSR. There are currently no quasars that are visible to the naked eye.

== List of quasars ==
This is a list of exceptional quasars for characteristics otherwise not separately listed

Quasar	Notes
Twin Quasar	Associated with a possible planet microlensing event in the gravitational lens galaxy that is doubling the Twin Quasar's image.
QSR J1819+3845	Proved interstellar scintillation due to the interstellar medium.
CTA-102	In 1965, Soviet astronomer Nikolai S. Kardashev posited that this quasar could be the source of signals from an alien civilization.
CID-42	Its supermassive black hole is being ejected and will one day become a displaced quasar.
TON 618	TON 618 is a very distant and extremely luminous quasar—technically, a hyperluminous, broad-absorption line, radio-loud quasar—located near the North Galactic Pole in the constellation Canes Venatici.

== List of named quasars ==
This is a list of quasars, with a common name, instead of a designation from a survey, catalogue or list.

Quasar	Origin of name	Notes
Twin Quasar	From the fact that two images of the same quasar are produced by gravitational lensing.	
Einstein Cross	From the fact that gravitational lensing of the quasar forms a near perfect Einstein cross, a concept in gravitational lensing.	
Triple Quasar	From the fact that there are three bright images of the same gravitationally lensed quasar.	There are actually four images; the fourth is faint.
Cloverleaf	From its appearance having similarity to the leaf of a clover. It has been gravitationally lensed into four images, of roughly similar appearance.	
Teacup Galaxy	The name comes from the shape of the extended emission, which is shaped like the handle of a teacup. The handle is a bubble shaped by quasar winds or small-scale radio jets.	Low redshift, highly obscured type 2 quasar.
Pōniuāʻena	The third most distant quasar known as of 2025, named for its early formation at most 100 million years after the Big Bang.	Named as part of the A Hua He Inoa program by the ʻImiloa Astronomy Center.

== List of multiply imaged quasars ==
This is a list of quasars that as a result of gravitational lensing appear as multiple images on Earth.

Quasar	Images	Lens	Notes
Twin Quasar	2	YGKOW G1	First gravitationally lensed object discovered
Triple Quasar (PG 1115+080)	4		Originally discovered as 3 lensed images, the fourth image is faint. It was the second gravitationally lensed quasar discovered.
Einstein Cross	4	Huchra's Lens	First Einstein Cross discovered
RX J1131-1231's quasar	4	RX J1131-1231's elliptical galaxy	RX J1131-1231 is the name of the complex, quasar, host galaxy and lensing galaxy, together. The quasar's host galaxy is also lensed into a Chwolson ring about the lensing galaxy. The four images of the quasar are embedded in the ring image.
Cloverleaf	4		Brightest known high-redshift source of CO emission
QSO B1359+154	6	CLASS B1359+154 and three more galaxies	First sextuply-imaged galaxy
SDSS J1004+4112	5	Galaxy cluster at z = 0.68	First quasar discovered to be multiply image-lensed by a galaxy cluster and currently the third largest quasar lens with the separation between images of 15″
SDSS J1029+2623	3	Galaxy cluster at z = 0.6	The current largest-separation quasar lens with 22.6″ separation between furthest images
SDSS J2222+2745	6	Galaxy cluster at z = 0.49	First sextuply-lensed galaxy Third quasar discovered to be lensed by a galaxy cluster. Quasar located at z = 2.82
RX J0911.4+0551	4	Galaxy located at z = 0.76	Gravitationally lensed object discovered by the ROSAT All-Sky survey in 1997. Quasar located at z = 2.800.
CLASS B1152+199	2	Galaxy located at z = 0.43	
HE 1104-1805	2	Galaxy located at z = 0.72	Also known as Double Hamburger.
HE 2149-2745	2	Galaxy at z = 0.60	Gravitationally lensed broad absorption object (BAL) at z = 2.033
FBQ 0951+2635	2	Galaxy located at z = 0.26	
HE0435-1223	4	Elliptical galaxy of HE0435-1223 at z = 0.45	Quasar located at z = 1.689. Components arranged in cross figuration.
SBS 0909+532	2	Lens galaxy of SBS 0909+532 at z = 0.83	Originally interpreted as a binary quasar but later revealed as a gravitationally lensed object.
UM 673	2	Lens galaxy at z = 0.49	Quasar located at at z = 2.71, first discovered by J. Surdej (1988)
CTQ 327	2	Lens galaxy between z = 0.4 and z= 0.6	
CTQ 414	2		Discovered in 1999. Quasar located at z = 1.29.
HE 0230-2130	5		Complex lensed system. Quasar located at z = 2.130.
SDSS J1001+5027	2	Lens galaxy at z = 0.3	
SDSS J1206+4332	2	Lens galaxy at z = 0.74	
SDSS J0246-0825	2	Lens galaxy at z = 0.724	Discovered by Scott Burles (2005).
SDSS J0904+1512	2		Discovered in the SDSS Quasar Lens Search (2010)
SDSS J1054+2733	2		Discovered in the SDSS Quasar Lens Search (2010)
SDSS J1620+1203	2	Lens galaxy at z = 0.39	Discovered in the SDSS Quasar Lens Search (2010). Quasar located at z = 1.158
SDSS J0746+4403	2	Lens galaxy at z = 0.513	Discovered in 2007. Quasar located at z = 2.00

== List of visual quasar associations ==
This is a list of double quasars, triple quasars, and the like, where quasars are close together in line-of-sight, but not physically related.

Quasars	Count	Notes
QSO 1548+115 4C 11.50 (z = 0.436) QSO B1548+115B (z = 1.901)	2	
QSO 1146+111	8	
z represents redshift, a measure of recessional velocity and inferred distance due to cosmological expansion

== List of physical quasar groups ==
This is a list of binary quasars, trinary quasars, and the like, where quasars are physically close to each other.

Quasars	Count	Notes
quasars of SDSS J0841+3921 protocluster	4	First quasar quartet discovered.
LBQS 1429-008 (QQQ 1432-0106)	3	First quasar triplet discovered. It was first discovered as a binary quasar, before the third quasar was found.
QQ2345+007 (Q2345+007) Q2345+007A Q2345+007B	2	Originally thought to be a doubly imaged quasar, but actually a quasar couplet.
QQQ J1519+0627	3	

=== Large Quasar Groups ===
Large quasar groups (LQGs) are bound to a filament of mass, and not directly bound to each other.

LQG	Count	Notes
Webster LQG (LQG 1)	5	First LQG discovered. At the time of its discovery, it was the largest structure known.
Huge-LQG (U1.27)	73	The largest structure known in the observable universe, as of 2013.

== List of quasars with apparent superluminal jet motion ==
This is a list of quasars with jets that appear to be superluminal due to relativistic effects and line-of-sight orientation. Such quasars are sometimes referred to as superluminal quasars.

Quasar	Superluminality	Notes
3C 279	4c	First quasar discovered with superluminal jets
3C 179	7.6c	Fifth discovered, first with double lobes
3C 273		This is also the first quasar ever identified
3C 216		
3C 345		
3C 380		
4C 69.21 (Q1642+690, QSO B1642+690)		
4C 39.25		
4C 38.41		
8C 1928+738 (Q1928+738, QSO J1927+73, Quasar J192748.6+735802)		
PKS 0637-752		

Quasars that have a recessional velocity greater than the speed of light (c) are very common. Any quasar with z > 1 is receding faster than c, while z exactly equal to 1 indicates recession at the speed of light. Early attempts to explain superluminal quasars resulted in convoluted explanations with a limit of z = 2.326, or in the extreme z < 2.4. The majority of quasars lie between z = 2 and z = 5.

== Firsts ==
Title	Quasar	Year	Data	Notes
First quasar discovered	3C 48	1960		First radio source for which optical identification was found, that was a star-like looking object
First "star" discovered later found to be a quasar	3C 48	1960		First radio source for which optical identification was found, that was a star-like looking object
First radio source discovered later found to be a quasar	3C 48	1960		First radio source for which optical identification was found, that was a star-like looking object
First quasar identified	3C 273	1962		First radio-"star" found to be at a high redshift with a non-stellar spectrum.
First radio-quiet quasar	QSO B1246+377 (BSO 1)	1965		The first radio-quiet quasi-stellar objects (QSO) were called Blue Stellar Objects or BSO, because they appeared like stars and were blue in color. They also had spectra and redshifts like radio-loud quasi-stellar radio-sources (QSR), so became quasars.
First host galaxy of a quasar discovered	3C 48	1982		
First quasar found to seemingly not have a host galaxy	HE0450-2958 (Naked Quasar)	2005		Some disputed observations suggest a host galaxy, others do not.
First multi-core quasar	PG 1302-102	2014	Binary supermassive black holes within the quasar	
First quasar containing a recoiling supermassive black hole	SDSS J0927+2943	2008		Two optical emission line systems separated by 2650 km/s
First gravitationally lensed quasar identified	Twin Quasar	1979	Lensed into 2 images	The lens is a galaxy known as YGKOW G1
First quasar found with a jet with apparent superluminal motion	3C 279	1971		
First quasar found with the classic double radio-lobe structure	3C 47	1964		
First quasar found to be an X-ray source	3C 273	1967		
First "dustless" quasar found	QSO J0303-0019 and QSO J0005-0006	2010		
First Large Quasar Group discovered	Webster LQG (LQG 1)	1982		

== Extremes ==
Title	Quasar	Data	Notes
Brightest	3C 273	Apparent magnitude of ~12.9	Absolute magnitude: −26.7
Seemingly optically brightest	APM 08279+5255	Seeming absolute magnitude of −32.2	This quasar is gravitationally lensed; its actual absolute magnitude is estimated to be −30.5
Most luminous	SMSS J215728.21-360215.1	Absolute magnitude of −32.36	Highest absolute magnitude discovered thus far.
Most powerful quasar radio source	3C 273		Also the most powerful radio source in the sky
Most powerful	SMSS J215728.21-360215.1		
Most variable quasar radio source	QSO J1819+3845 (Q1817+387)		Also the most variable extrasolar radio source
Least variable quasar radio source			
Most variable quasar optical source			
Least variable quasar optical source			
Most distant	UHZ1	z = 10.1	Most distant quasar known as of 2023
Most distant radio-quiet quasar			
Most distant radio-loud quasar	QSO J1427+3312	z = 6.12	Found June 2008
Most distant blazar quasar	PSO J0309+27	z > 6	
Least distant	Markarian 231	600 Mly	inactive: IC 2497
Largest Large Quasar Group	Huge-LQG (U1.27)	73 quasars	
Fastest Growing Quasar	SMSS J052915.80–435152.0 (QSO J0529-4351)	~ 413 solar masses per year (using standard radiative efficiency); ~ 370 solar masses per year (using best-fit slim disc model)	

== First quasars found ==
First 10 Quasars Identified
Rank	Quasar	Date of discovery	Notes
1	3C 273	1963	
2	3C 48	1963	
3	3C 47	1964	
3	3C 147	1964	
5	CTA 102	1965	
5	3C 287	1965	
5	3C 254	1965	
5	3C 245	1965	
5	3C 9	1965	
These are the first quasars which were found and had their redshifts determined.

== Most distant quasars ==
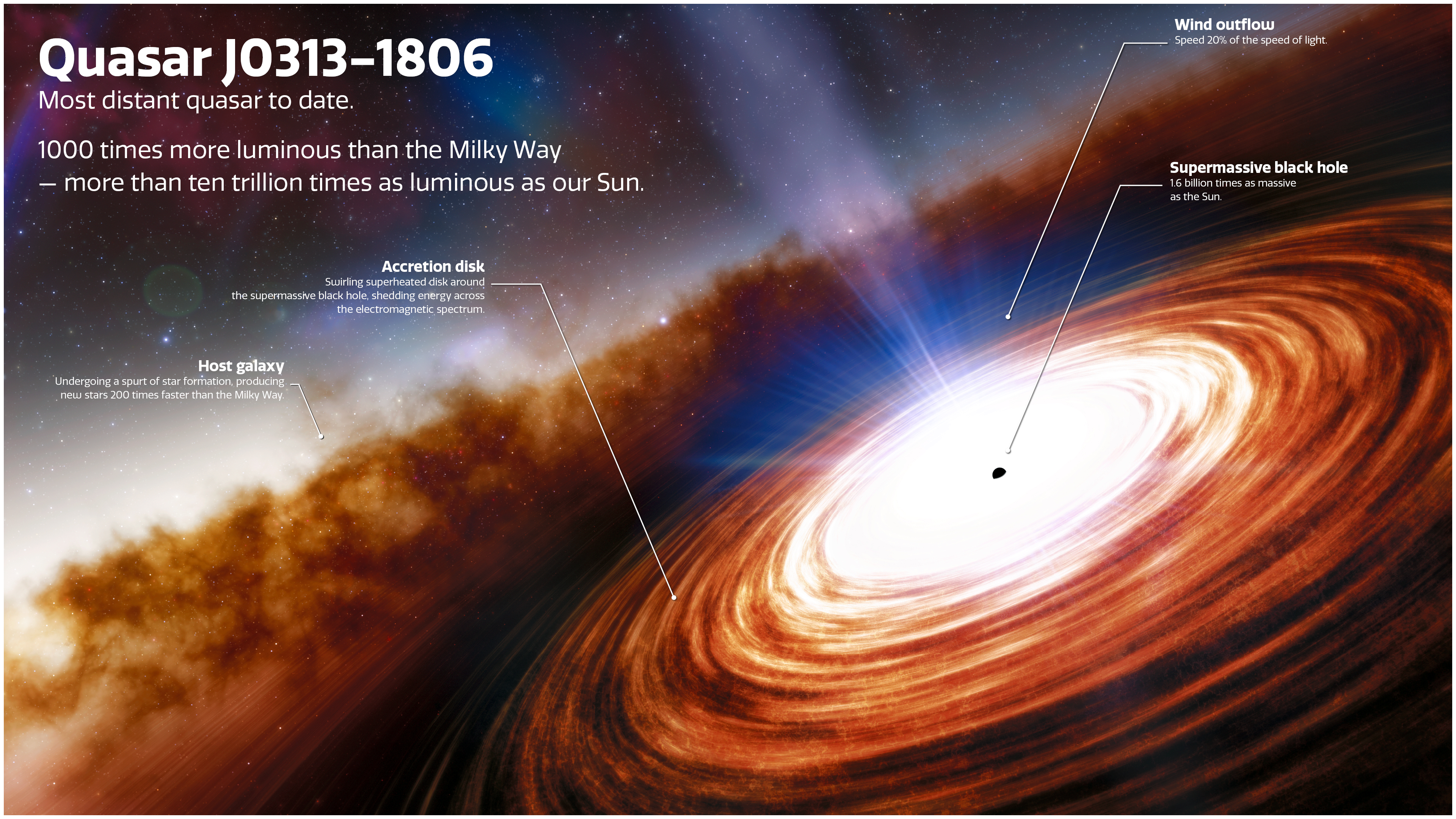
Artist's conception of the oldest known quasar as of 2021, QSO J0313–1806 existing only ~670 million years after the Big Bang despite its large size.

In 1964 a quasar became the most distant object in the universe for the first time. Quasars would remain the most distant objects in the universe until 1997, when a pair of non-quasar galaxies would take the title (galaxies CL 1358+62 G1 & CL 1358+62 G2 lensed by galaxy cluster CL 1358+62).

In cosmic scales distance is usually indicated by redshift (denoted by z) which is a measure of recessional velocity and inferred distance due to cosmological expansion.

Quasars with z > 6
Quasar	Distance	Notes
UHZ1	z = 10.1	Most distant quasar known as of 2023
QSO J0313–1806	z = 7.64	Former most distant quasar.
ULAS J1342+0928	z = 7.54	Former most distant quasar.
Pōniuāʻena (Q J1007+2115)	z = 7.52	
ULAS J1120+0641 (ULAS J112001.48+064124.3)	z = 7.085	Former most distant quasar. First quasar with z > 7.
DELS J003836.10-152723.6	z = 7.02	
HSC J235646.33+001747.3	z = 7.01	
DES J025216.64-050331.8	z = 7.00	
CHFQS J2348-3054 (CHFQS J234833.34-305410.0)	z = 6.90	
PSO J172.3556+18.7734	z = 6.82	Currently the most distant radio-loud known quasar
HSC J135012.04-002705.2	z = 6.49	
CFHQS J2329-0301 (CFHQS J232908-030158)	z = 6.43	Former most distant quasar.
SDSS J114816.64+525150.3 (SDSS J1148+5251)	z = 6.419	Former most distant quasar.
SDSS J1030+0524 (SDSSp J103027.10+052455.0)	z = 6.28	Former most distant quasar. First quasar with z > 6.
SDSS J104845.05+463718.3 (QSO J1048+4637)	z = 6.23	
SDSS J162331.81+311200.5 (QSO J1623+3112)	z = 6.22	
CFHQS J0033-0125 (CFHQS J003311-012524)	z = 6.13	
SDSS J125051.93+313021.9 (QSO J1250+3130)	z = 6.13	
CFHQS J1509-1749 (CFHQS J150941-174926)	z = 6.12	
QSO B1425+3326 / QSO J1427+3312	z = 6.12	Most distant radio-quasar.
SDSS J160253.98+422824.9 (QSO J1602+4228)	z = 6.07	
SDSS J163033.90+401209.6 (QSO J1630+4012)	z = 6.05	
CFHQS J1641+3755 (CFHQS J164121+375520)	z = 6.04	
SDSS J113717.73+354956.9 (QSO J1137+3549)	z = 6.01	
SDSS J081827.40+172251.8 (QSO J0818+1722)	z = 6.00	
SDSSp J130608.26+035626.3 (QSO J1306+0356)	z = 5.99	
z > 6 quasars are used to explore the reionization era

Most Distant Quasar by Type
Type	Quasar	Date	Distance	Notes
Most distant	UHZ1	2023	z = 10.2	
Most distant radio loud quasar	QSO B1425+3326 / QSO J1427+3312	2008	z = 6.12	
Most distant radio quiet quasar				
Most distant OVV quasar				

Most Distant Quasar Titleholders
Quasar	Date	Distance	Notes
UHZ1	2023–	z = 10.2	Current distance record holder
QSO J0313−1806	2021–2023	z = 7.64	
ULAS J1342+0928	2017–2021	z = 7.54	
ULAS J1120+0641	2011–2017	z = 7.085	Not the most distant object when discovered. First quasar with z > 7.
CFHQS J2329-0301 (CFHQS J232908-030158)	2007–2011	z = 6.43	Not the most distant object when discovered. It did not exceed IOK-1 (z = 6.96), which was discovered in 2006.
SDSS J114816.64+525150.3 (SDSS J1148+5251)	2003–2007	z = 6.419	Not the most distant object when discovered. It did not exceed HCM 6A galaxy lensed by Abell 370 at z = 6.56, discovered in 2002. Also discovered around the time of discovery was a new most distant galaxy, SDF J132418.3+271455 at z = 6.58.
SDSS J1030+0524 (SDSSp J103027.10+052455.0)	2001–2003	z = 6.28	Most distant object when discovered. First object with z > 6.
SDSS 1044-0125 (SDSSp J104433.04-012502.2)	2000–2001	z = 5.82	Most distant object when discovered. It exceeded galaxy SSA22-HCM1 (z = 5.74; discovered in 1999) as the most distant object.
RD300 (RD J030117+002025)	2000	z = 5.50	Not the most distant object when discovered. It did not surpass galaxy SSA22-HCM1 (z = 5.74; discovered in 1999).
SDSSp J120441.73−002149.6 (SDSS J1204-0021)	2000	z = 5.03	Not the most distant object when discovered. It did not surpass galaxy SSA22-HCM1 (z = 5.74; discovered in 1999).
SDSSp J033829.31+002156.3 (QSO J0338+0021)	1998–2000	z = 5.00	First quasar discovered with z > 5. Not the most distant object when discovered. It did not surpass galaxy BR1202-0725 LAE (z = 5.64; discovered earlier in 1998).
PC 1247+3406	1991–1998	z = 4.897	Most distant object when discovered.
PC 1158+4635	1989–1991	z = 4.73	Most distant object when discovered.
Q0051-279	1987–1989	z = 4.43	Most distant object when discovered.
Q0000-26 (QSO B0000-26)	1987	z = 4.11	Most distant object when discovered.
PC 0910+5625 (QSO B0910+5625)	1987	z = 4.04	Most distant object when discovered; second quasar with z > 4.
Q0046–293 (QSO J0048-2903)	1987	z = 4.01	Most distant object when discovered; first quasar with z > 4.
Q1208+1011 (QSO B1208+1011)	1986–1987	z = 3.80	Most distant object when discovered and a gravitationally-lensed double-image quasar. From the time of discovery to 1991, had the least angular separation between images, 0.45″.
PKS 2000-330 (QSO J2003-3251, Q2000-330)	1982–1986	z = 3.78	Most distant object when discovered.
OQ172 (QSO B1442+101)	1974–1982	z = 3.53	Most distant object when discovered.
OH471 (QSO B0642+449)	1973–1974	z = 3.408	Most distant object when discovered; first quasar with z > 3. Nicknamed "the blaze marking the edge of the universe".
4C 05.34	1970–1973	z = 2.877	Most distant object when discovered. The redshift was so much greater than the previous record that it was believed to be erroneous, or spurious.
5C 02.56 (7C 105517.75+495540.95)	1968–1970	z = 2.399	Most distant object when discovered.
4C 25.05 (4C 25.5)	1968	z = 2.358	Most distant object when discovered.
PKS 0237-23 (QSO B0237-2321)	1967–1968	z = 2.225	Most distant object when discovered.
4C 12.39 (Q1116+12, PKS 1116+12)	1966–1967	z = 2.1291	Most distant object when discovered.
4C 01.02 (Q0106+01, PKS 0106+1)	1965–1966	z = 2.0990	Most distant object when discovered.
3C 9	1965	z = 2.018	Most distant object when discovered; first quasar with z > 2.
3C 147	1964–1965	z = 0.545	First quasar to become the most distant object in the universe, beating radio galaxy 3C 295.
3C 48	1963–1964	z = 0.367	Second quasar redshift measured. Redshift was discovered after publication of 3C273's results prompted researchers to re-examine spectroscopic data. Not the most distant object when discovered. The radio galaxy 3C 295 was found in 1960 with z = 0.461.
3C 273	1963	z = 0.158	First quasar redshift measured. Not the most distant object when discovered. The radio galaxy 3C 295 was found in 1960 with z = 0.461.

== Most powerful quasars ==
10 most luminous quasars
Rank	Quasar	Data	Refs.
1	SMSS J215728.21-360215.1	Intrinsic bolometric luminosity of ~ 6.9 × 10^{14} Suns or ~ 2.6 × 10^{41} watts	
2	HS 1946+7658	Intrinsic bolometric luminosity in excess of 10^{14} Suns or 10^{41} watts	
3	SDSS J155152.46+191104.0	Luminosity of over 10^{41} watts	
4	HS 1700+6416	Luminosity of over 10^{41} watts	
5	SDSS J010013.02+280225.8	Luminosity of around 1.62 × 10^{41} watts	
6	SBS 1425+606	Luminosity of over 10^{41} watts – optically brightest for z>3	
	J1144-4308	Luminosity of 4.7 × 10^{40} watts or M_i(z=2) = −29.74 mag, optically brightest in last 9 Gyr	
	SDSS J074521.78+473436.2		
	S5 0014+813		
	SDSS J160455.39+381201.6	z = 2.51, M(i) = 15.84	
	SDSS J085543.40-001517.7		

== See also ==
- List of microquasars
- Lists of astronomical objects
- List of galaxies
- List of black holes
