= SMSS J215728.21–360215.1 =

Fast-growing quasar

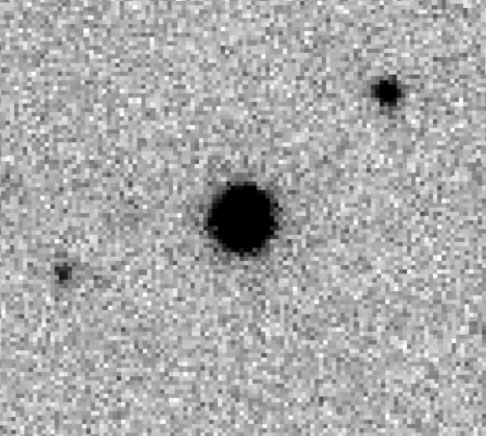
- Image of SMSS J2157-3602, taken by the VISTA Hemispheric Survey.

Observation data (Epoch )
- Constellation: Piscis Austrinus
- Right ascension: 21^{h} 57^{m} 28.21^{s}
- Declination: −36° 02′ 15.1″
- Redshift: 4.75 or 4.692

Other designations
- J2157–3602

SMSS J215728.21–360215.1, commonly known as J2157–3602 or shortly J2157, is one of the fastest growing black holes, the second largest black hole and one of the most powerful quasars known to exist as of 2026. The quasar is located at redshift 4.75, corresponding to a comoving distance of 2.5×10^{10} ly from Earth and to a light-travel distance of 1.25×10^{10} ly. It was discovered with the SkyMapper telescope at Australian National University's Siding Spring Observatory, announced in May 2018. It has an intrinsic bolometric luminosity of 6.95×10^{14} L_{☉} (2.66×10^{41} W) and an absolute magnitude of -32.36. It has also a diameter of 99 billion kilometers (661.54 astronomical units).

In July 2020 the black hole associated with the quasar was reported to be 34 billion solar masses, based on a study published in Monthly Notices of the Royal Astronomical Society.
