= CFHQS J2329–0301 =

Quasar in the constellation Pisces

Observation data (Epoch J2000.0)
- Constellation: Pisces
- Right ascension: 23^{h} 29^{m} 08^{s}
- Declination: −03° 01′ 58″
- Redshift: 6.43
- Distance: 12.7 Gly (3.9 Gpc)
- Apparent magnitude (V): 21.7

Other designations
- CFHQS J2329–0301 , CFHQS J232908–030158

CFHQS J2329–0301 is a quasar discovered in 2007 by the Canada–France–Hawaii High-z Quasar Survey (CHFQS) using the Canada–France–Hawaii Telescope. Until the discovery of ULAS J1120+0641 in June 2011, it was the furthest known quasar with a light travel distance of about 12.7 billion light years from Earth. Since it is very bright, its light can be used to determine the properties of the gas in front of it. The black hole powering the quasar is thought to have about 500 million solar masses.

== See also ==
- List of the most distant astronomical objects

Records
| Preceded by SDSS J114816.64+525150.3 | Most distant quasar 2007 – 2011 | Succeeded by ULAS J1120+0641 |
