= QSO J0529−4351 =

Quasar with extreme luminosity

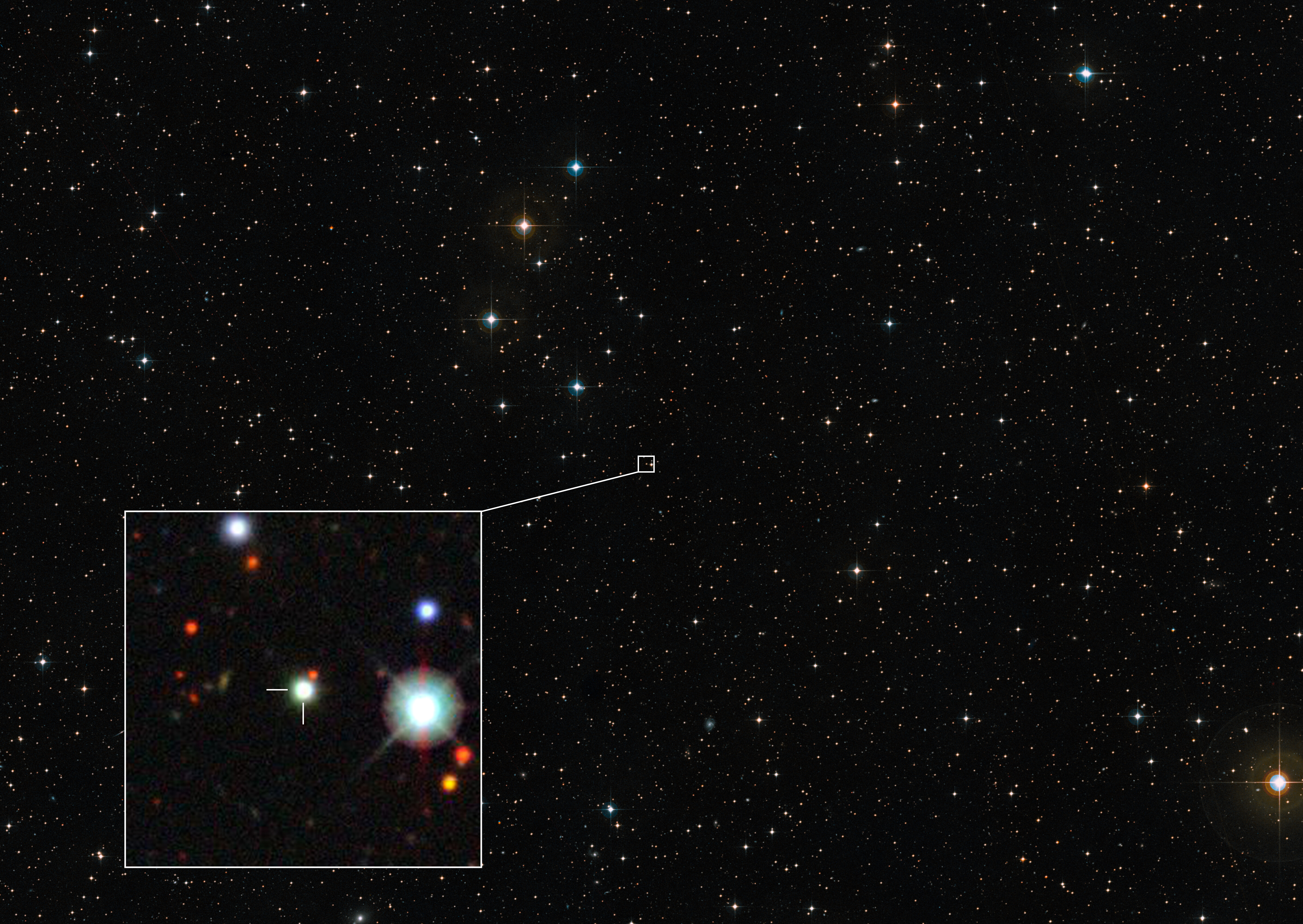
- Wide-field of the region around the quasar J0529−4351

Observation data (Epoch )
- Constellation: Pictor
- Right ascension: 05^{h} 29^{m} 15.8^{s}
- Declination: −43° 51′ 52″
- Redshift: 3.962
- Apparent magnitude (V): 16
- Notable features: brightest of its kind; most luminous object ever observed; contains fastest growing black hole

Other designations
- SMSS J052915.80−435152.0; Quasar J0529−4351

QSO J0529−4351 (SMSS J052915.80−435152.0) is a quasar, 12 billion light-years away in the constellation Pictor, notable for being the most luminous object ever observed at roughly 500 trillion times the luminosity of the Sun. The black hole at its centre has a mass of approximately 17 billion solar masses, and accretes around one solar mass per day. In a Gaia DR3 data set published on 13 June 2022, QSO J0529−4351 was assigned a 99.98% probability of being a star in the Milky Way via an automated analysis. However, the quasar was identified as one using the Very Large Telescope of the European Southern Observatory; the discovery was announced on 19 February 2024.

== Detection and identification ==
The object itself was detected in ESO images dating back to 1980, but its identification as a quasar occurred only several decades later.

An automated analysis of 2022 data from the European Space Agency's Gaia satellite did not confirm J0529−4351 as too bright to be a quasar, and suggested it was a 16th magnitude star with a 99.98% probability. In 2023, using observations from the 2.3-meter ANU telescope at Siding Spring Observatory in Australia, it was identified as a distant quasar. However, discovering that this was the brightest quasar ever observed required a larger telescope—the X-shooter spectrograph on the European Southern Observatory's VLT in Chile's Atacama Desert. However, additional observations are needed to definitively exclude the possibility of gravitational lensing as a possible explanation for such a high brightness of the quasar.

We discovered an object whose true essence was not immediately recognized, although it literally looked into our eyes for many years, because it was shining brightly, most likely even before the birth of man. But now we understand that this is not just one of the nearby stars of our Milky Way, but a very distant object.

— project leader, employee of the Australian National University (ANU) Christian Wolf., BBC article

== Characteristics ==
The redshift of J0529−4351 is 3.962. The object itself is classified as a radio-quiet quasar. Fitting accretion models to the spectra yields an accretion rate of matter onto the black hole of 280 to 490 solar masses per year for an accretion disk around the black hole observed at an angle of zero to 60 degrees, with accretion occurring near the Eddington limit. The total bolometric luminosity is estimated at 10^{48.37} ergs per second.

The mass of the black hole was earlier estimated at 17 billion solar masses. However, in September 2025, the black hole was found to have a mass of only equivalent to one billion suns, making it much smaller as expected, compared to the previous observation in 2024. Astronomers also noted the gas from the black hole wasn't shown as rotating, but instead it was being released at rapid speeds.

== Also ==
- List of quasars
