= OQ 172 =

Quasar in the constellation Boötes

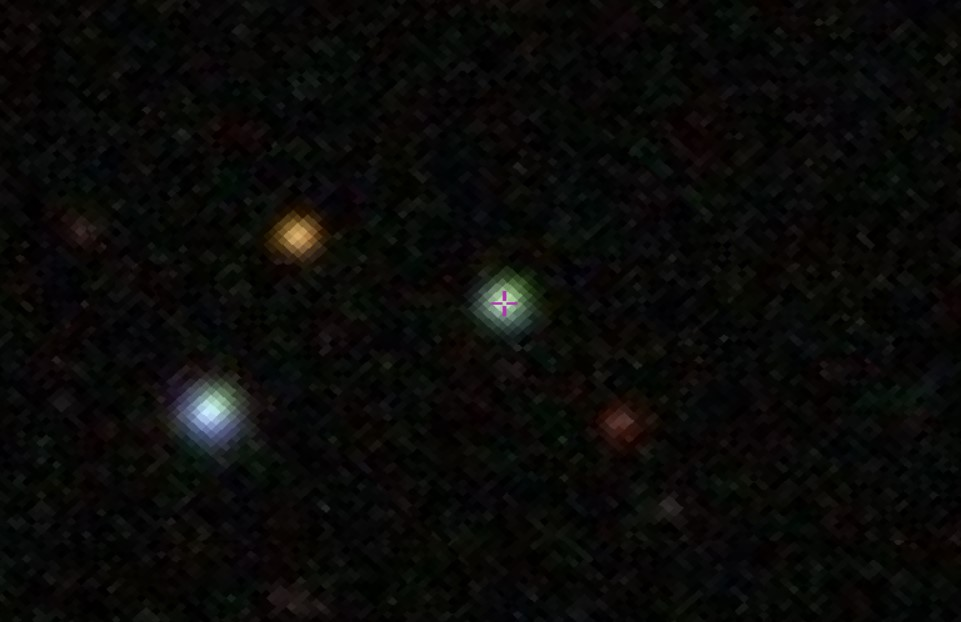
- The quasar OQ 172.

Observation data (J2000.0 epoch)
- Constellation: Boötes
- Right ascension: 14^{h} 45^{m} 16.465^{s}
- Declination: +09° 58′ 36.073″
- Redshift: 3.540681
- Distance: 11.543 Gly
- Apparent magnitude (V): 17.78
- Apparent magnitude (B): 18.58

Characteristics
- Type: GPS, FSRQ

Other designations
- LEDA 2828124, PKS 1442+101, NVSS J144516+095836, QSO B1442+101, TXS 1442+101, CoNFIG 200, IERS B1442+101

OQ 172 (OHIO Q 172) is a quasar located in the constellation of Boötes. It has a redshift of (z) 3.544, making it one of the most distant quasars at the time of its discovery by astronomers in 1973. This object was the record holder for almost a decade, before being surpassed by PKS 2000-330 in 1982 located at the redshift of (z) 3.78.

== Description ==
The source of OQ 172 has a radio spectrum characterized by its spectral peak in the gigahertz domain, making it a gigahertz-peaked spectrum quasar (GPS) or a compact steep spectrum source (CSS).

OQ 172 contains a core-jet structure with the radio core itself located in the northern region of the radio emission. This core is found to show a flat spectrum up to > 30 GHz in the rest frame with a steep spectrum above 30 GHz which continues steepening until 1000 GHz, thus confirming there is no buried flat spectrum core within the emission source.

The jet of OQ 172 is found to turn almost at an 180° angle with jet emission in the west-southwest direction extending right from the core, eventually bending almost southwards. When reaching 20 mas south of the core, the jet immediately bends once again, this time at 90° and extends towards the east. A further study also shows the jet has three components, one of which is the fastest at a proper motion of 0.13 ± 0.01 mas yr^{−1}. With a mean T_{B} of 15.5 ± 6.4 × 10^{10} K, this suggests OQ 172 has a highly beamed jet.

Very long baseline interferometry radio observations revealed OQ 172 has magnetic fields on parsec scales which rotate the polarization plane of the radio emission originating from both its core and inner jet. Based on the derived rest-frame rotational measurement of RM 40,000 rad m^{−2}, it is found OQ 172 has the highest value amongst other known RM sources. When at 10 mas from the core, the jet's absolute value of RM decreases to <100 rad m^{−2}. Additionally, linear polarized emission has been detected in both components in all five frequencies. The core has low fractional polarization, while the jet components have a higher polarization. A rotational measurement was obtained at 4.8 and 8.3 GHz respectively, showing a high value of 2000 rad m^{−2} in the innermost region of OQ 172. Towards the outer jet regions, this value drops to 700 rad m^{−2}, quickly decreasing to lower values.
