= 3C 9 =

Quasar in the constellation of Pisces

Observation data (Epoch J2000)
- Constellation: Pisces
- Right ascension: 00^{h} 20^{m} 25.22^{s}
- Declination: +15° 40′ 54.7″
- Redshift: 2.0194; 240,526 km/s
- Distance: 10 billion light-years (light travel time); ~17 billion light-years (present comoving distance)
- Type: FR II RG; QSO
- Apparent magnitude (V): 17.62

Other designations
- 2C 26, LEDA 2817473

3C 9 is a lobe-dominated quasar located in the constellation Pisces. This quasar is classified as radio loud with a jet. It has X-ray emission located primary on two sides of its nucleus, based on Chandra observations.

The host of 3C 9 is described as a ring-like galaxy undergoing a merger. The two nuclei of the merging galaxies are estimated to be 9 kiloparsecs apart.

In 1965, it was the most distant object discovered at the time of discovery. This was the first object found with a redshift in excess of 2.
