= SDSS J1029+2623 =

Gravitationally lensed quasar in the constellation Leo

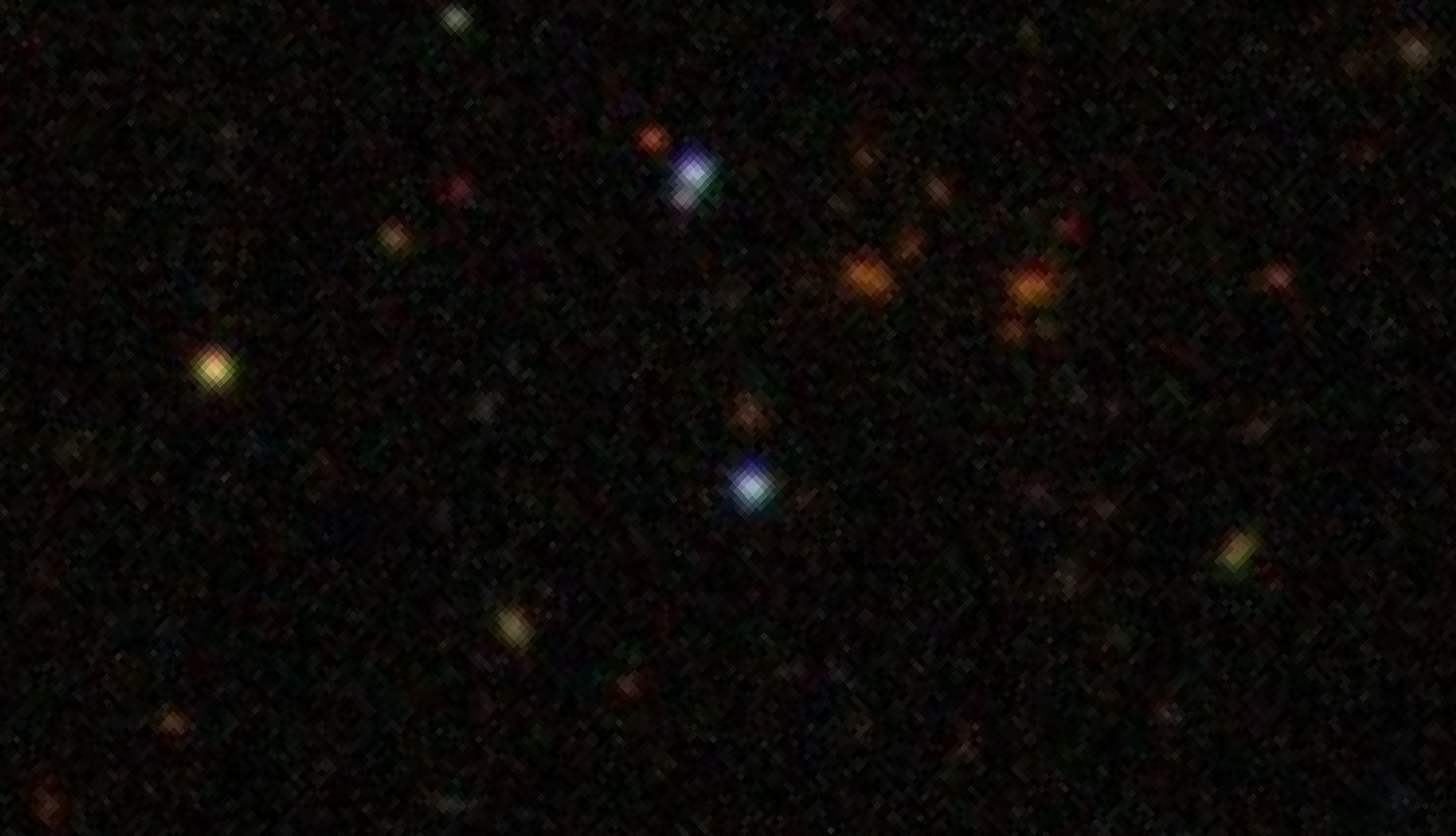
- SDSS image of SDSS J1029+2623.

Observation data (J2000.0 epoch)
- Constellation: Leo
- Right ascension: 10^{h} 29^{m} 13.94^{s}
- Declination: +26° 23′ 17.97″
- Redshift: 2.212883
- Heliocentric radial velocity: 663,406 km/s
- Distance: 10.353 Gly
- Apparent magnitude (V): 18.84
- Apparent magnitude (B): 19.08

Characteristics
- Type: Candidate QSO

Other designations
- SDSS J102913.95+262318.0, 2MASS J10291396+2623181, LQAC 157+026 008

SDSS J1029+2623 is a gravitationally lensed radio-loud quasar located in the constellation of Leo. The redshift of the object is estimated to be (z) 2.212 and was first discovered by Naohisa Inada and Masamune Oguri in December 2006.

== Description ==
SDSS J1029+2623 is a double imaged quasar. It is separated into two components with a large angular separation of 22.5 arcseconds, making it the largest known separation lens. Like SDSS J1004+4112, it is lensed by a massive galaxy cluster located at (z) 0.588 with an Einstein radius of 15.2 ± 0.5 arcseconds and a bolometric luminosity of 9.6 × 10^{44} erg s^{−1}, making it the second known quasar lensed by a cluster. Further observations discovered there is a third component in the lens system with its spectrum displaying emission and absorption features, however it has a redder continuum. Several lensed arcs are also identified in the system. In the field of SDSS J1029+2623, several galaxies are discovered at redshifts of 2.181, 3.027 and 5.062 based on spectroscopy data from the Large Area Telescope. A dark matter clump was discovered in a slight offset position from component B with a measured mass of 10^{9} M_{☉}.

The quasar shows time-delays according to Janine Fohlmeister. Based on optical monitoring data obtained over 5.4 years, the time delay is estimated to be 744 ± 10 days with component A shown leading component B and component C. Fohlmeister suggested it displays weak evidence of microlensing, likely arising from a smaller galaxy responsible for its flux ratio anomaly. However an observation in 2020, confirmed no signs of microlensing but evidence of extinction. In combined light-curves, the intrinsic variability of SDSS J1029+2623 displays an amplitude at 100 days of 0.15 ± 0.03 magnitude with a power-law slope of 0.32 ± 0.02.

Observations showed both of the components of SDSS J1029+2623 display narrow absorption-lines in their spectrum with ejection velocities of 1000 kilometers per seconds. According to results, there are 66 detected narrow absorption-lines of which 24 of them are classified as intrinsic. There are also broader proximity absorption lines (PALs) which are created in outflowing gas with measured electron densities of 8.7 × 10^{3} cm^{−3} with multiple sightline observations suggesting they have larger sizes compared to sightline projection distances.

SDSS J1029+2623 has outflowing wind originating from its accretion disk. When observed in mid-resolution spectroscopy, the carbon absorption-line profile shows no clear variation towards any lines of sight. It is also found to deblend into more than 10 narrow components, indicating it is related to the quasar. The absorption profiles of both A and B components remained constant since observations conducted in 2010, suggesting not time variability but differences along sightlines. It is suggested the outflow wind in SDSS J1029+2623 is confined to both a continuum source and a broad emission-line region measuring a size of 0.09 parsecs since the residual flux located at the bottom of absorption lines are closer to zero. The estimated supermassive black hole mass for SDSS J1029+2623 is 10^{8.72} M_{☉}.
