= CLASS B1152+199 =

Gravationally lensed quasar in the constellation Leo

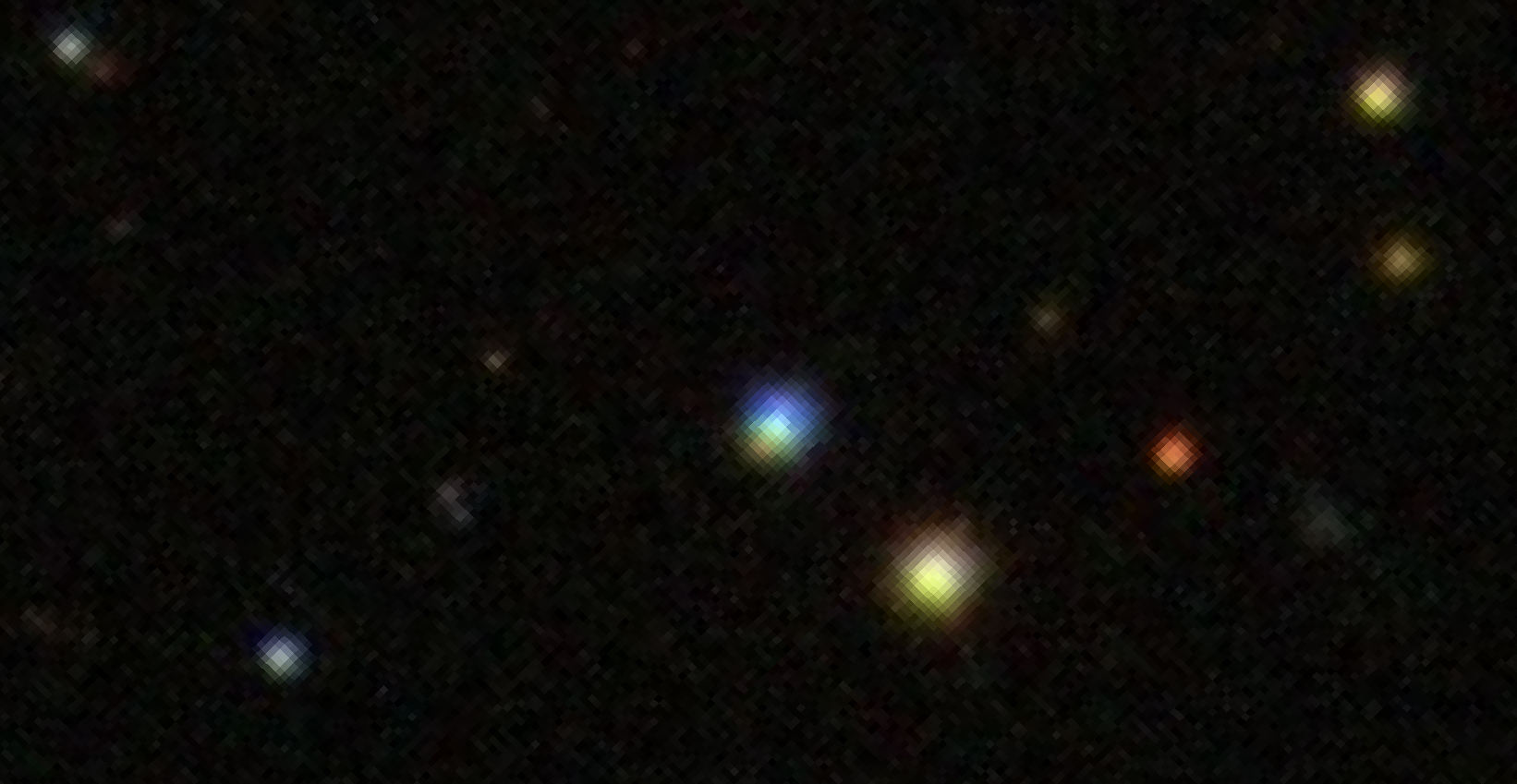
- SDSS image of CLASS B1152+199.

Observation data (J2000.0 epoch)
- Constellation: Leo
- Right ascension: 11^{h} 55^{m} 18.29^{s}
- Declination: +19° 39′ 42.23″
- Redshift: 1.018900
- Heliocentric radial velocity: 305,459 km/s
- Distance: 7.737 Gly
- Apparent magnitude (V): 16.89
- Apparent magnitude (B): 17.15

Characteristics
- Type: QSO

Other designations
- 2MASSI J1155182+193941, PB 03719, RX J1155.2+1939, TXS 1152+199, OCARS 1152+199

CLASS B1152+199 is a gravitationally lensed quasar located in the constellation of Leo. It has a redshift of (z) 1.018 and it was first discovered during the Cosmic Lens All-Sky Survey by astronomers in 1999, alongside CLASS B1359+154.

== Description ==
CLASS B1152+199 is a double quasar. When imaged, it is found to split into two individual flat radio spectrum components with flux densities of 69.5 and 58.1 mJy, at 8.46 and 14.94 GHz frequencies respectively. A third faint source is found located by 23 arcseconds away from the components, although it is unrelated to them.

The redshift of the lens galaxy of CLASS B1152+199, is (z) 0.439 ± 0.0008 based on absorption line systems measurements at two distinctive redshifts. It is either classified as either a late-type or an irregular galaxy according to its R-I band color of 0.80 ± 0.05, with its extinction curve best fitted with a Galactic extinction law. It is also classified as a ghostly damped Lyman-alpha system because of its large amount of cold interstellar medium based on both optical extinction and X-ray absorption measurements. A dust-to-gas ratio for the lens galaxy has been calculated as E(B-V)/N_{H} = (2.5 ± 0.2) × 10^{−22} mag cm^{−2} atoms^{−1} with weak evidence suggested for its X-ray flux ratio.

The lens components of CLASS B1152+199 were analyzed, and the components displayed detections of polarized flux with component A containing a polarization percentage of (2.7 ± 0.1)% at 6.1 GHz and (2.4 ± 0.2)% when observed at 8.6 GHz. Component B on the other hand, has a percentage of (1.9 ± 0.4)% at both frequencies. The rotation measurements of both A and B components are 70 and 560 rad/m^{2}. A model time delay of 60 days has been estimated for the components with the A component passing outside the lens galaxy with the B component passing through it.

CLASS B1152+199 shows a compact core in both of the components. There are also extended jet features in the components. A study published in December 2019, showed the jet in component A is 20 milliarcseconds in extent and appears continuous when observed in Very Long Baseline Array imaging. It is straight, displaying a weak blob extension feature suggesting a counter-jet. The jet in component B on the other hand, has a slight downwards curve unlike the jet in component A with three jet components, however in 2022, this was revealed to be a misalignment.
