= SDSS J114816.64+525150.3 =

Quasar in the constellation Ursa Major

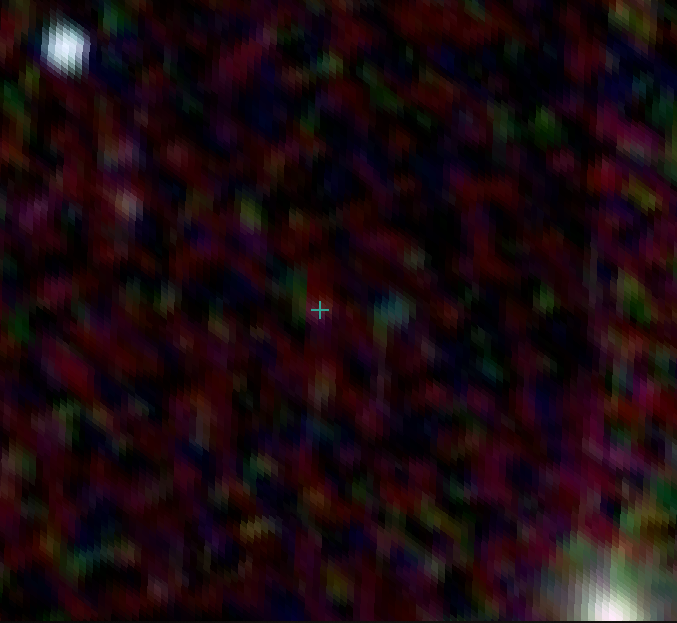
- SDSS J114816.64+525150.3 captured by Two Micron All Sky Survey

Observation data (Epoch )
- Constellation: Ursa Major
- Right ascension: 11^{h} 48^{m} 16.64^{s}
- Declination: 52° 51′ 50.3″
- Redshift: 6.419
- Apparent magnitude (V): 25.53

SDSS J114816.64+525150.3 (J1148+5251) was the most distant known quasar when it was discovered in 2003, at redshift Z=6.419. The quasar is powered by a 3 billion solar mass supermassive black hole.

== Imaging with amateur-grade telescope ==
The Virtual Telescope Project imaged the quasar between March and April 2024, with a 350-millimeter (14 in) Celestron Schmidt–Cassegrain telescope, on a Software Bisque Paramount ME robotic mount. A total of 81, 300-second exposures were combined, for a total of almost 7 hours of exposure, recording sources as faint as about magnitude R=25. The team termed it "the most distant quasar observable at visible wavelengths".

== See also ==
- List of the most distant astronomical objects

Records
Preceded by	Most distant quasar 2007 – 2011	Succeeded by CFHQS J2329-0301
