= RX J0911.4+0551 =

Quasar in the constellation of Hydra

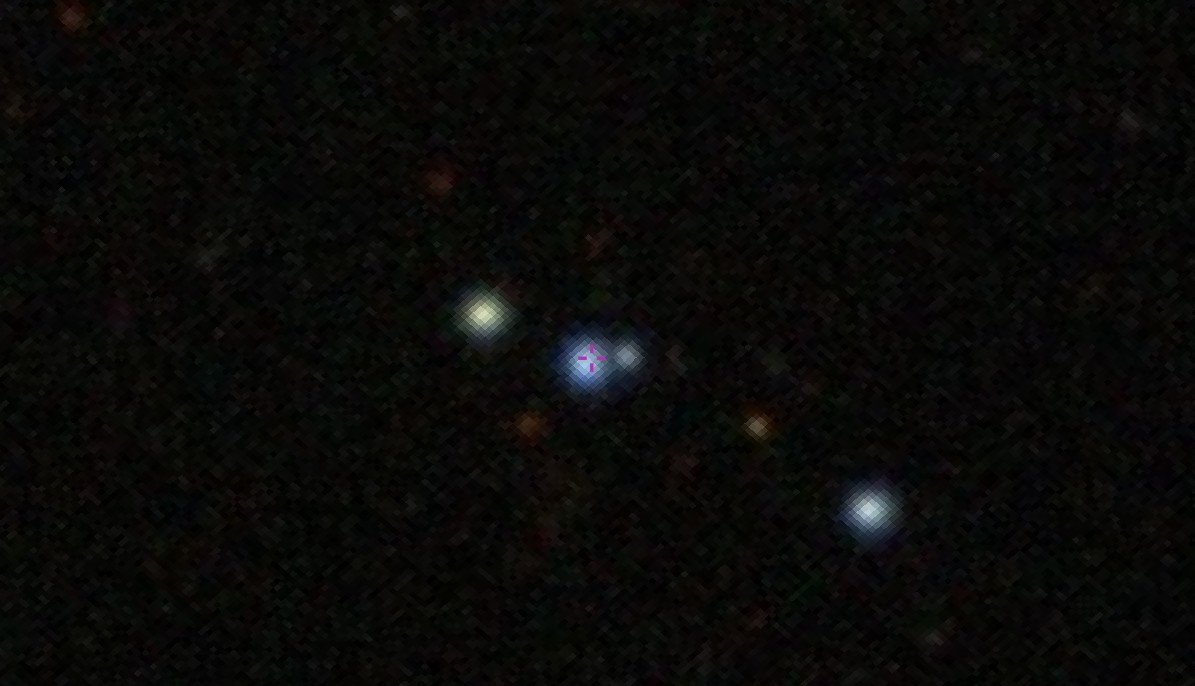
- The gravitationally lensed quasar, RX J0911.4+0551.

Observation data (J2000.0 epoch)
- Constellation: Hydra
- Right ascension: 09^{h} 11^{m} 27.6420^{s}
- Declination: +05° 50′ 54.171″
- Redshift: 2.798188
- Heliocentric radial velocity: 838,876 km/s
- Distance: 10.995 Gly
- Apparent magnitude (V): 18.16
- Apparent magnitude (B): 18.44

Characteristics
- Type: BAL QSO

Other designations
- SDSS J091127.61+055054.1, LQAC 137+005 008, 1RXS J091127.8+055113

RX J0911.4+0551 is a gravitationally-lensed quasar located in the constellation of Hydra. It has a high redshift of (z) 2.800 and was first discovered by astronomers who were conducting the ROSAT All-Sky Survey in 1997. This is a radio-quiet object with an X-ray luminosity of 4.10^{46} ergs.

== Description ==
RX J0911.4+0551 is a quadruped imaged quasar with a wide angular separation of 3.1 arcseconds. When imaged by high resolution imaging by both Nordic Optical Telescope and New Technology Telescope, it is found to be split into four images and lensed by a foreground galaxy located at a redshift of (z) 0.769. The lens galaxy is described as elongated based on I-band imaging; apparently looking like as an edge-on spiral with a bright nucleus and elongated diffused disk, according to near-infrared imaging. This lensed galaxy is known to be located in a galaxy cluster which in turn displays an extreme shear distortion for this lensing effect.

The optical light curves of the components of RX J0911.4+0551 showed it has time delays. Based on results, the time delay is found significantly short with a period of 146 ± 8 days between the two observed components identified as A and B. The component (B) is found to be the leading component. Raw and deconvolved imaging by Chandra X-ray Observatory also showed it as extended along east to west direction. An emission profile made up of a bright component was also found located southwest of B, being stretched towards the quasar's direction.

The host galaxy of RX J0911.4+0551 is described to be young galaxy in stages of evolving without indications of a major merger. It has a star formation rate of 140 M_{☉} yr^{−1} and found to produce a molecular outflows reaching a rate of 180 M_{☉} yr^{−1} indicating the large fraction of gas would be depleted within a lifetime of 100 million years. Observations by the Plateau de Bure Interferometer also showed the host's low gas mass is 2.3 ± 0.5 × 10^{9} M_{☉} and it has a total far-infrared luminosity rate measuring as 7.2 ± 1011 L_{☉}. The host also has a carbon monoxide (CO) (5-4) line profile displaying a compact structure based on observations by Atacama Large Millimetre Array, with a full width at half maximum measuring 133 ± 3 kilometers per seconds.

Several absorption line systems located at redshifts of (z) 2.790, 2.42 and 2.63 have been identified in the quasar's A and B spectra. Since these absorption lines display a velocity dispersion of around 1,000 kilometers per seconds, the quasar has a mini broad absorption line. A rapid flare has been detected by Chandra with a duration of 2,000 seconds in November 2000.
