= 4C 39.25 =

Quasar in the constellation Leo Minor

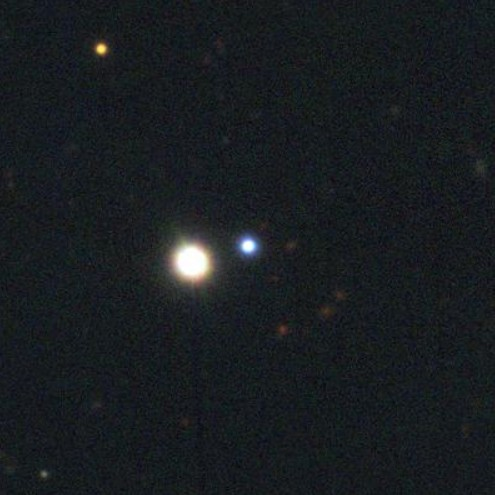
- The quasar 4C 39.25

Observation data (J2000.0 epoch)
- Constellation: Leo Minor
- Right ascension: 09^{h} 27^{m} 03.0139^{s}
- Declination: +39° 02′ 20.850″
- Redshift: 0.695898
- Heliocentric radial velocity: 208,625 km/s
- Distance: 6.102 Gly
- Apparent magnitude (V): 17.00

Characteristics
- Type: Opt. var.; Sy1, LPQ

Other designations
- DA 267, QSO B0923+392, LEDA 2820605, RBS 776, 7C 092355.20+391523.00

4C 39.25 is a quasar located in the constellation of Leo Minor with a redshift of (z) 0.698. It was first discovered in 1966 as an astronomical radio source and subsequently identified with a blue stellar object in 1967. The object is known to have a superluminal jet.

== Description ==
4C 39.25 is classified as a high frequency peaker (HFP). It is shown to display strong flux density variations although not highly variable. Its radio spectrum is found to have a convex shape with a peak of 11 GHz. Additionally, the object also has significant variability, detected at all frequencies. Between 1996 and 2003, the flux density of the source at 3 millimetre dropped from 6 to 3 Jansky (Jy). However it rose again to present flux density levels of 4.5 Jy.

The source of 4C 39.25 is compact. Its radio structure is best described as a simple double source but also contracting, containing a most compact feature on the western region. Radio imaging observations on sub-arcsecond scale showed the source as core-dominated, containing a bright radio core surrounded by radio emission. The core is found elongated in all directions according to observations by Very Long Baseline Interferometry (VLBI). Very Large Array (VLA) radio mapping on arcseconds depicted the structure of the source as symmetric, resolved by shorter wavelengths as a lumpy jet embedded in an emission region.

4C 39.25 contains a bend jet which extends eastwards. The jet is shown to have an emission bridge linking from one component to another. Within the jet, lies two individual stationary components located in west and east directions. In the middle of the components, there is another component moving by about 0.16 or −0.02 microarcsecond each year, in agreement to an average speed measuring between 3.2c and 8.4c, confirming superluminal motion. Evidence also showed the source has a strong discrepancy in its X-ray flux density, with its relativistic motion mainly originating from excessive inverse Compton flux.
