= 3C 380 =

Quasar in the constellation Draco

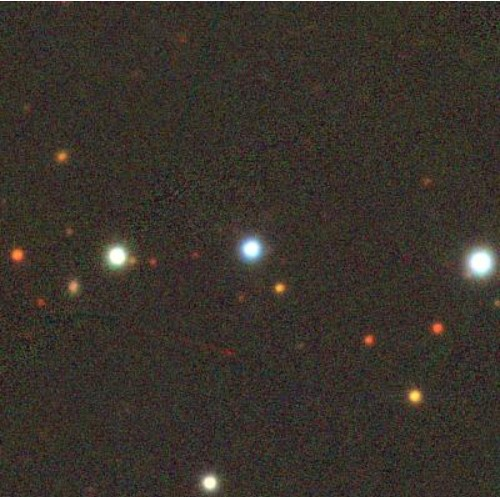
- The quasar 3C 380.

Observation data (J2000.0 epoch)
- Constellation: Draco
- Right ascension: 18^{h} 29^{m} 31.7809^{s}
- Declination: +48° 44′ 46.161″
- Redshift: 0.6920000
- Heliocentric radial velocity: 207,456 km/s
- Distance: 6.074 Gly
- Apparent magnitude (V): 16.81
- Apparent magnitude (B): 17.05

Characteristics
- Type: Opt. var, Sy 1.5, LPQ

Other designations
- CTA 79, NRAO 565, LEDA 2817708, QSO B1828+4842, 4C +48.46, S4 1828+487, WK 396, WMAP 46,

3C 380 is a radio-loud quasar located in the constellation of Draco. First discovered in 1965 and identified with a starlike object, it is one of the luminous and powerful radio sources in Third Cambridge Catalogue, with a redshift of (z) 0.692 and a compact steep spectrum (CSS) source.

== Description ==
3C 380 contains a complex radio structure. Radio images produced by the very long baseline interferometry (VLBI) at 5 GHz, showed the source is mainly extended, containing several components including a compact radio core and a ridge of extended radio emission. In additional, the quasar also has a diffused halo with a spectral index of 1.0 ± 0.2 which represents a common feature of the radio lobes in Fanaroff-Riley class II quasars. An extended radio lobe was also discovered in 3C 380, having a low spectral index when compared to those at decimeter wavelengths. There are also two hotpots located in northwest direction.

The radio jet of 3C 380 on parsec-scales is known to be bent. Based on VLBI observations, it is shown to be resolved when travelling in a transverse direction, however it also shows signs of rapid brightness variations unlike other nuclear jets indicating phase effects play a role in causing these changes. Apart from that, the jet shows superluminal motion and a Faraday rotation gradient measuring 70-200 parsecs in width across it. Radio imaging Very Long Baseline Array (VLBA) also finds the jet is extending in a northwest direction.

According to Hubble Space Telescope (HST) and VLBA, the jet has two knots. These knots are respectively named as knot 1, located 0.73 arcseconds from the core and knot 2 which is located 0.4 arcseconds away from the former. Together, these knots are found laid over lobelike emission which in turn, is stretched out in both east and northeast directions.

Multifrequency polarization have also been found in 3C 380. Based on observations, both the core and jet contains polarization by 6 percent, while the other component has 16 percent polarization. Enhanced flux density at 24 GHz from the object was also detected in September 2020.
