= 3C 287 =

Quasar in the constellation Coma Berenices

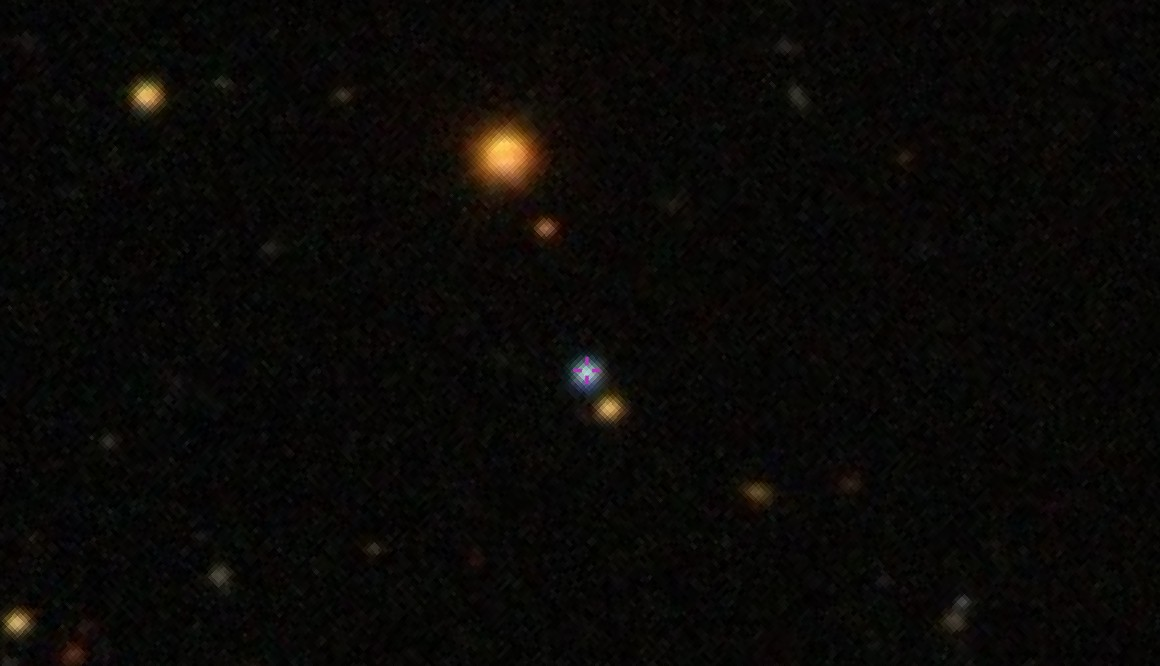
- The quasar 3C 287.

Observation data (J2000.0 epoch)
- Constellation: Coma Berenices
- Right ascension: 13^{h} 30^{m} 37.6900^{s}
- Declination: +25° 09′ 10.878″
- Redshift: 1.055000
- Heliocentric radial velocity: 316,281 km/s
- Distance: 7.733 Gly
- Apparent magnitude (V): 17.67
- Apparent magnitude (B): 18.31

Characteristics
- Type: CSS

Other designations
- 4C 25.43, DA 345, NRAO 424, LEDA 2817651, LHE 347, CTA 61, QSO B1328+254

3C 287 is a quasar located in the constellation of Coma Berenices. It has a redshift of (z) 1.055, and such classified as a prototype compact steep spectrum source (CSS). This object was first discovered between January and February 1964 via a photographic two-color technique.

== Description ==
3C 287 is classified as radio-loud quasar with a gigahertz peaked spectrum. It is found to have continuum radio emission in southwest direction, likely originating from either an M-type star or an underlying galaxy that is located from the object. It is a candidate precessing source, shown to have a position displacement between 2014 and 2017, likely caused by the brightening of a new component. A bright companion can be found southwest from the object.

The radio source of 3C 287 is compact with no signs of a secondary structure. Based on radio mapping images made by very long baseline interferometry (VLBI) and MERLIN, it contains several filamentary structures located both west and southwest directions, hinting the continuation of a spiral pattern. There is a bright compact component located in the center of the source, revealed to be a small radio core whose extent is measured lower than 4 milliarcseconds. There is a curved jet. At both frequencies, the brightness of the source exhibits a decrease with its two-point spectral index showing a shift from 0.5 to 1.5 along a ridge line. Radio polarimetric observations taken by Very Long Baseline Array (VLBA) at sub-arcsecond resolutions, showed the source is classified as point-like. There is a much weaker extension located in the south.

X-band polarimetric observations of 3C 287 captured by VLBA, found most of the polarized emission originated from the brightest region. Based on results, its magnetic field geometry is found complex exhibiting a 90° on a milliarcsecond scale.
