= 3C 179 =

Quasar in the constellation of Camelopardalis

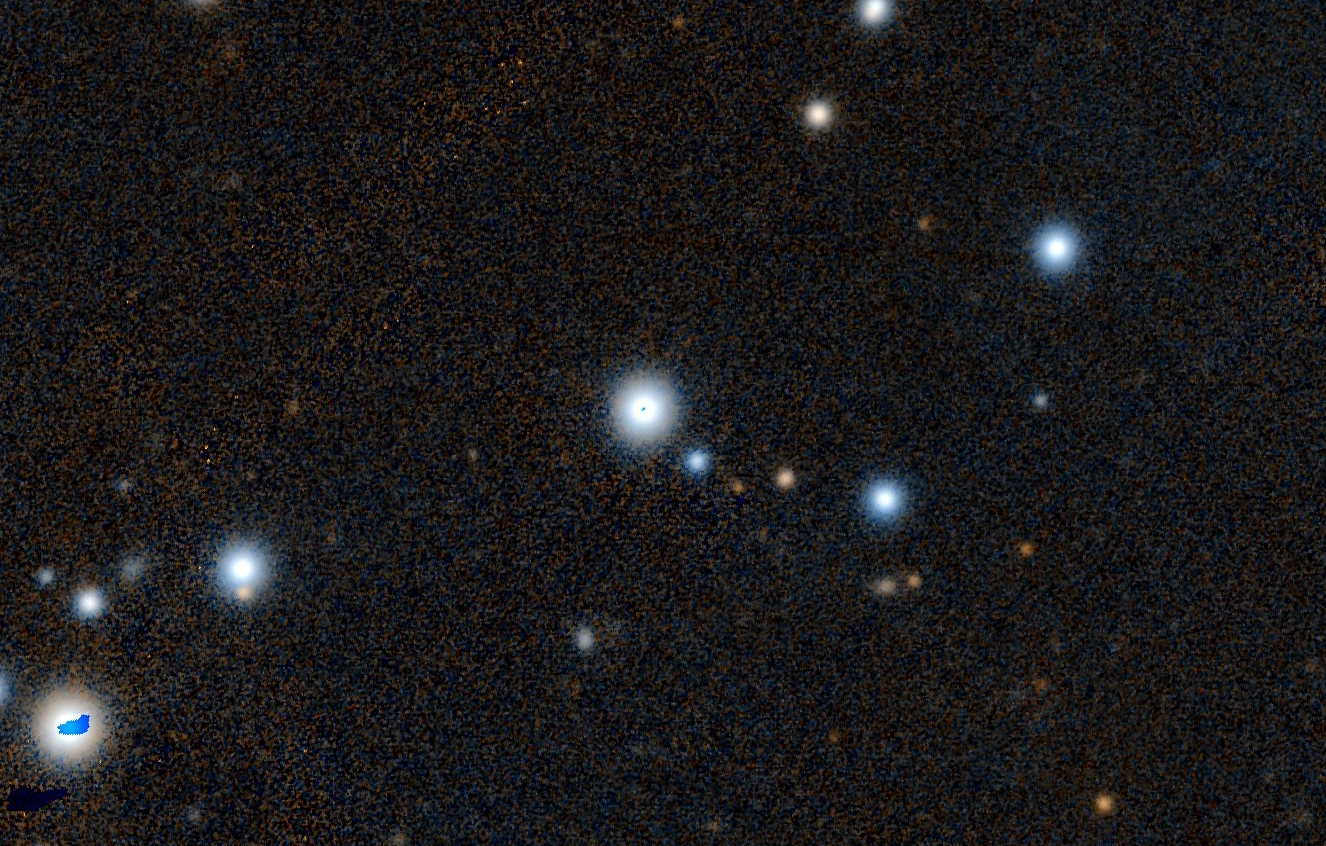
- Pan-STARRS image of 3C 179

Observation data (J2000.0 epoch)
- Constellation: Camelopardalis
- Right ascension: 07^{h} 28^{m} 10.89^{s}
- Declination: +67° 48′ 47.03″
- Redshift: 0.841600
- Heliocentric radial velocity: 252,305 km/s
- Distance: 7.035 Gly
- Absolute magnitude (V): 18.0

Characteristics
- Type: Sy 1.2, LPQ SSRQ

Other designations
- 4C +67.14, NVSS J072811+674847, 8C 0723+679, LEDA 2817576, DA 233, NRAO 0263, 2XMM J072810.7+674847, TXS 0723+679, OCARS 0723+679

3C 179 is a powerful Fanaroff–Riley Type II quasar located in the northern constellation of Camelopardalis. Its redshift is (z) 0.841 and it was first discovered as an astronomical radio source in 1966. It is classified as a radio-loud object and is noted for being the first known double-lobed source to display superluminal motion.

== Description ==
3C 179 has a compact radio structure. When imaged with Very Large Array (VLA), it has two radio lobes, with its western lobe displaying a different morphology and expanding in southwards direction, through a radio emission region. The eastern lobe on the other hand, is found to split into two main features. There is a strong and bright core dominating the central region of the quasar. It is suggested the core might be marginally elongated in east to west direction. Very Long Baseline Interferometry (VLBI) observations have found the two components detected on milliarcseconds, are moving at relative velocities. A bright knot of emission can be seen dotting 0.8 arcseconds along the 270° position angle from the core.

MERLIN imaging revealed 3C 179 has a jet. This jet found one-sided, has a knotty appearance and shows a 'splash' knot feature making it somehow disrupted. It is then further spit into two other jet sections which in turn, goes off in two different directions. When imaged, the bright deflated branch of the jet is described as either decollimated or expanding towards the path of a terminal hotspot region. The weaker branch of the jet however, is found moving southwest before fading away into the extended part of the lobe. According to VLA, the entire jet is shown curving northwards.

The core of 3C 179 is described having detections of superluminal motion. Based on observations made by VLBI, it has a double inner structure at the position angle of –92°. Evidence has shown the components are separating apart from each other by 1.07 milliarcseconds, later changing to 1.24 milliarcseconds. The eastern component was also observed and is found increasing in flux density by 15 percent.

== See also ==
- Third Cambridge Catalogue of Radio Sources (3C)
