= LBQS 1429-008 =

Triple quasar

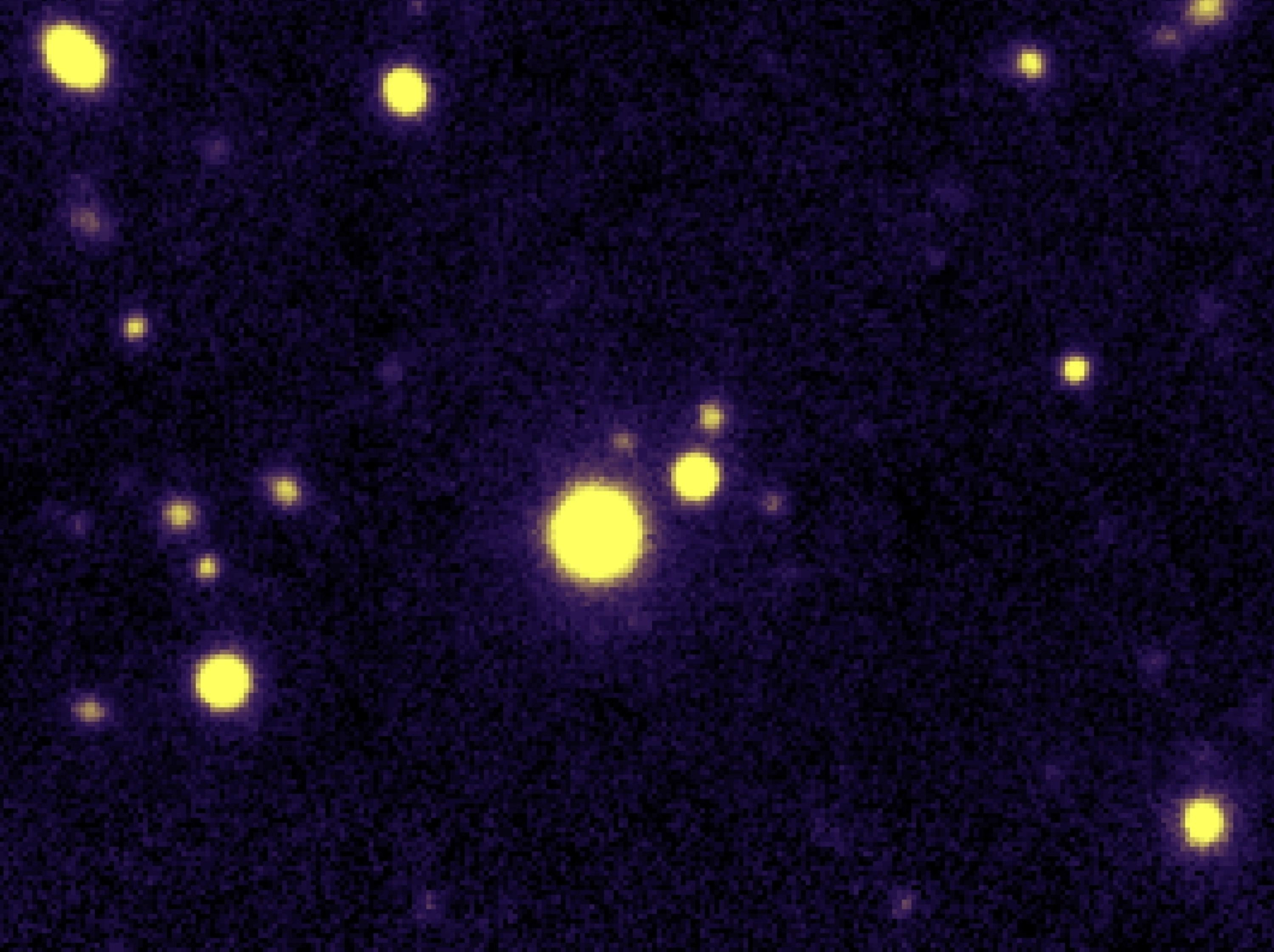
- A image of the Quasar.

Observation data (Epoch J2000)
- Constellation: Virgo
- Right ascension: 14^{h} 32^{m} 29.25^{s}
- Declination: −01° 06′ 16.1″
- Redshift: 2.08
- Distance: 10.5 gly
- Type: QSO
- Apparent magnitude (V): 17.7
- Notable features: Triple quasar system

Other designations
- LBQS 1429-0053, QSO B1429-0053, SDSS J143229.24-010616.0, VV2006 J143229.2-010617, FIRST J143229.3-010614, QSO B1429-008A, HB93 1429-008, QSO B1429-0053A, QSO J1432-0106A, QSO B1429-008

LBQS 1429-008 (QQ 1429−008, QQ 1432−0106, QQQ J1432−0106) is a distant physical triple quasar located 10.5 billion light years away from Earth in the constellation of Virgo. It was discovered in 1989 by Paul Hewett and his colleagues from the Institute of Astronomy, Cambridge in England.

Originally a binary pair instead of a gravitational lensed quasar, a third quasar component was found in LBQS 1429-008 during an observation by a team of researchers from Keck Observatory who used a 10-meter telescope. This makes them the first physical triple quasar discovered. The system has an estimated separation of 30-50 kiloparsecs.
