= CTQ 327 =

Gravitationally-lensed quasar in constellation Hydra

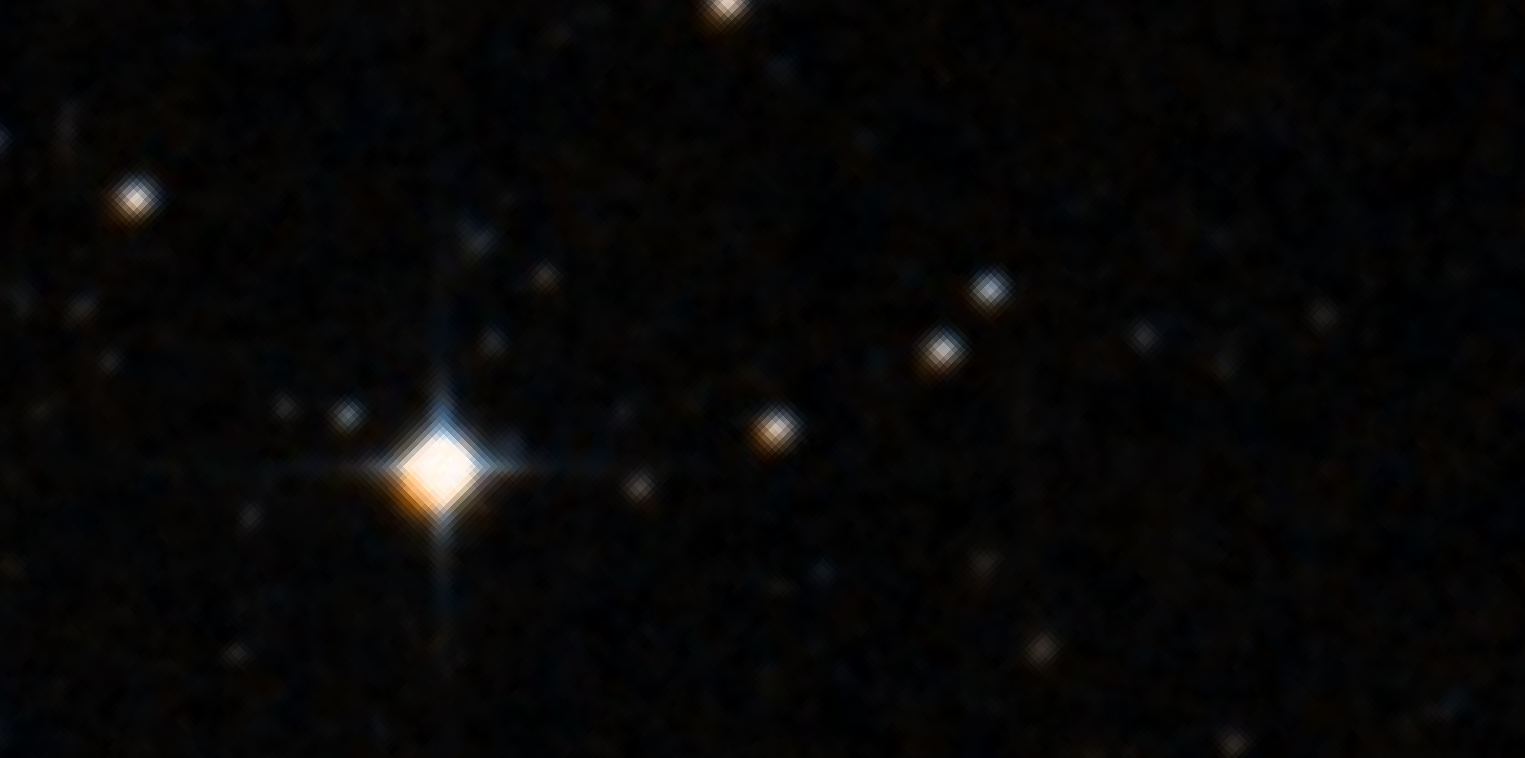
- DSS image of CTQ 327.

Observation data (J2000.0 epoch)
- Constellation: Hydra
- Right ascension: 13^{h} 55^{m} 43.43^{s}
- Declination: −22° 57′ 23.16″
- Redshift: 1.370000
- Heliocentric radial velocity: 410,716 km/s
- Distance: 8.735 Gly
- Apparent magnitude (B): +18.2

Characteristics
- Type: QSO

Other designations
- 2MASSI J1355434-225723, 2CXO J135543.4-225723, CTS 0327, CTS M15.16

CTQ 327 also known as Q 1355-2257, is a gravitationally-lensed quasar located in the constellation of Hydra. It was discovered in 1992 from the Calan-Tololo Survey, with its redshift of the object calculated as (z) 1.37 by N.D. Morgan during the Hubble Space Telescope Imaging Spectrograph snapshot survey in August 2003.

== Description ==
CTQ 327 is a double imaged quasar. When imaged by Morgan, the object is found to separate into two bright images or components, with an estimated separation gap of 1.22 arcseconds and a g-band flux ratio roughly 5 to 1. The components are found to display continuum and emission line features in their spectra, mainly doubly ionized carbon and magnesium, despite not similar to one another, with component A having much weaker emission lines compared to component B.

The lensing galaxy of CTQ 327 is resolved and classified an early-type elliptical galaxy with a redshift of (z) 0.70, located from component B by 0.29 milliarcseconds. An absorption feature is found to be associated with it at (z) 0.48. A stellar mass of 11.56 M_{☉}, and an effective radius of 1.24 ± 0.29 arcseconds has been found for the lens galaxy with the total Einstein radius of 0.62 arcseconds.

The quasar displays time-delays. Based on observations by P. Saha using a lens model, the predicted time-delay is −89^{+28}_{−39} days long. A more recent study in August 2020, estimated a new time-delay of −81.5^{+10.8}_{−12.0} days based on a measurement pipeline. It is shown the flux ratios of both components have temporal variations based on g-band Magellan observations of 0.14 magnitude during a period of over three months. Comparison of second-epoch data obtained in March and June, have also found component A of CTQ 327 underwent a significant decrease in brightness by 0.125 ± 0.001 magnitude while component B showed no observed changes.

CTQ 327 has evidence of chromatic microlensing with wavelengths greater than λ > 6180Å. Astronomers also noted, the core of emission lines and continuum also displayed a discrepancy in magnitude results of -0.06 and +0.08 respectively. They also noted the accretion disk of CTQ 327 is larger with a size of 3.6^{+3.0}_{−1.6} x 1.3 ± 0.6 M/M_{☉} and has a temperature profile of 2.0 ± 0.7. The black hole mass is estimated as 1.1 × 10^{9} M_{☉}.
