= RX J1131−1231 =

Supermassive-black-hole-containing quasar in the constellation Crater

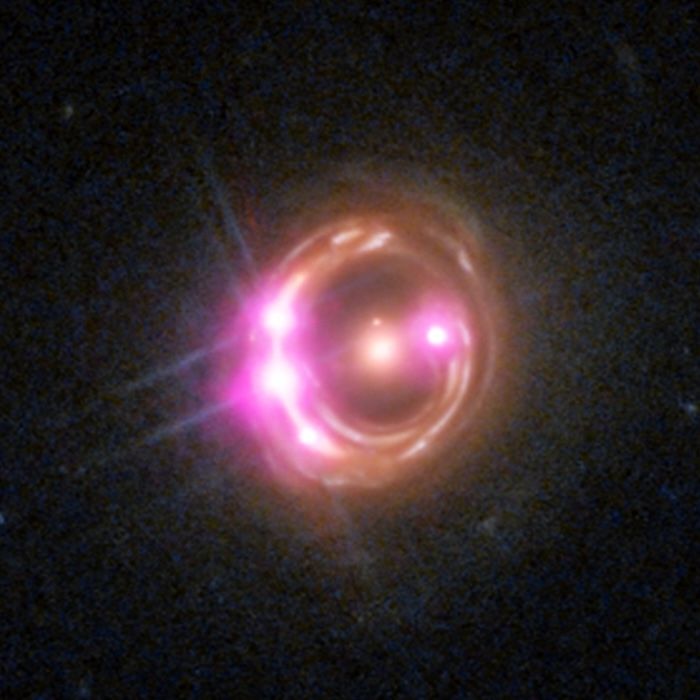
- Combination image of quasar RX J1131 (four duplicate images of it appear along the ring in pink) taken via NASA’s Chandra X-ray Observatory and the Hubble Space Telescope.

Observation data (Epoch J2000)
- Constellation: Crater
- Right ascension: 11^{h} 31^{m} 51.60^{s}
- Declination: −12° 31′ 57.00″
- Redshift: 0.658
- Distance: 6.05 Gly
- Notable features: rotation is half the speed of light, extragalactic planets

Other designations
- QSO J1131−1231, LEDA 3772549, 2MASX J11315154−1231587

RX J1131−1231 is a distant, supermassive-black-hole-containing quasar located about 6 billion light years from Earth in the constellation Crater.

In 2014, astronomers found that the X-rays being emitted are coming from a region inside the accretion disk located about three times the radius of the event horizon. This implies that the black hole must be spinning incredibly fast to allow the disk to survive at such a small radius. The measurement of the black hole's rotation is the first time astronomers have been able to directly measure the rotational speed of any black hole.

This determination was made by a team led by Rubens Reis of the University of Michigan using NASA's Chandra X-ray Observatory and the European Space Agency's XMM-Newton telescopes. The team observed the X-rays generated in the innermost regions of the disk circling and feeding the black hole that powers the quasar. By measuring the radius of the disk, the astronomers were able to calculate the black hole's rotational speed, which was almost half the speed of light. The rapid spin of the quasar indicates that the black hole is being fed by a vast supply of gas and dust.

However, the measurements would not have been possible without a rare alignment of the quasar and a giant elliptical galaxy (which is itself part of a cluster of other galaxies in line with the quasar) which lies between Earth and RX J1131−1231. This line-up provided a quadruple gravitational lens which magnified the light coming from the quasar. The strong gravitational lensing effect associated with RX J1131−1231 has also produced measured time delays; that is, in one image the lensed quasar will be observed before the other image.

== Extragalactic planets ==
A population of unbound planets between stars with masses ranging from Moon to Jupiter masses has been confirmed for the first time in the galaxy by the use of microlensing in 2018, at a ratio of 2000 planets to every main-sequence star.

== Gallery ==
James Webb photo of the quasar gravitationally lensed by a galaxy

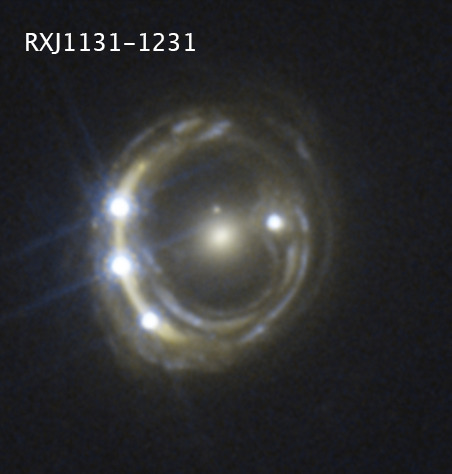
Combined Hubble and Chandra photo

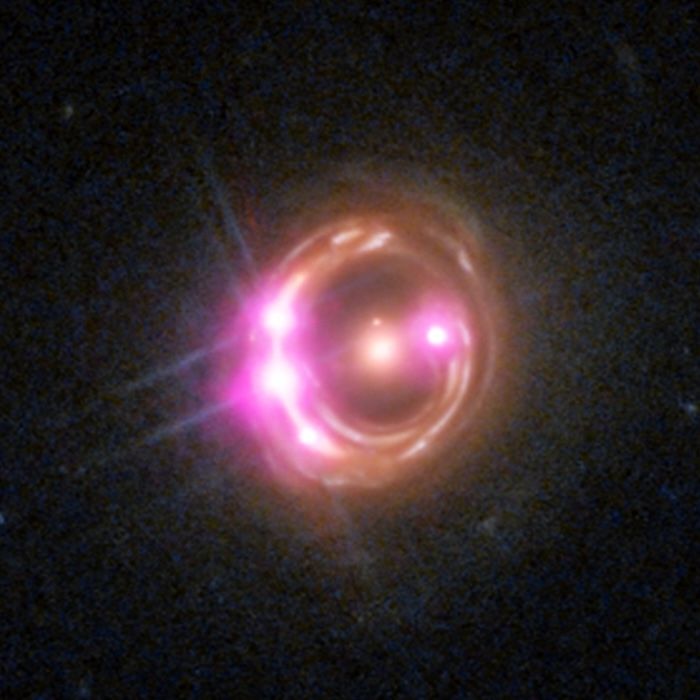
Combined Hubble and Chandra photo, with a different coloring

== See also ==
- Einstein Cross
