= Pōniuāʻena =

Third most distant quasar known with a redshift of 7.52

Pōniuāʻena J1007+2115
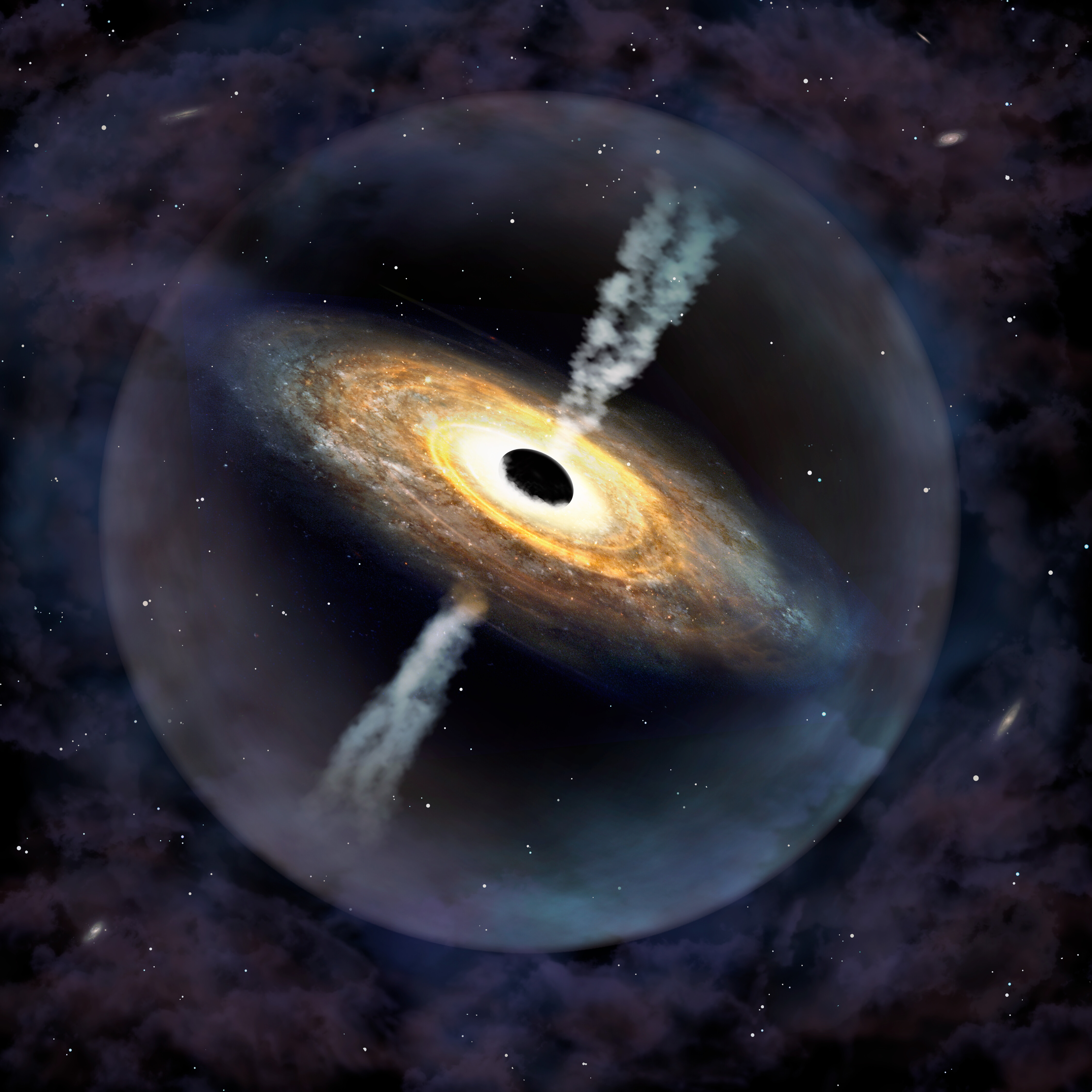
- A depiction of Pōniuāʻena created by NOIRLab

Observation data (Epoch J2000.0)
- Constellation: Leo
- Right ascension: 10^{h} 07^{m} 58.264^{s}
- Declination: +21° 15′ 29.207″
- Redshift: 7.52
- Distance: 1.302×10^{10} light-years (3.99×10^{9} parsecs) (light-travel distance)

Other designations
- J100758.264+211529.207, WISEA J100758.33+211529.4

Pōniuāʻena (/ˌpoʊniuːɑːˈɛnə/), also named J100758.264+211529.207 or J1007+2115, is the third most-distant quasar known, with a measured redshift of z = 7.515 or a lookback time of 13.02 billion years. Its 1.5 billion–solar mass black hole is one of the most distant black holes currently known, and models indicate that it must have formed not later than 100 million years after the Big Bang, before reionization. Its discovery was announced in June 2020. Only the quasars ULAS J1342+0928 (z = 7.54) and J0313–1806 (z = 7.64) are known to be more distant.

The quasar was primarily observed at the Mauna Kea Observatories on the island of Hawaiʻi; it was first discovered at the Gemini Observatory and was further identified using data from the W. M. Keck Observatory, UKIRT, Magellan Telescopes, and ALMA. Hawaiian language experts at ʻImiloa Astronomy Center gave it the name Pōniuāʻena [ˌpoːnijuwaːˈʔɛnə], which "evokes the unseen spinning source of creation, surrounded by brilliance."
