= HE 1104−1805 =

Gravitationally lensed quasar in the constellation Crater

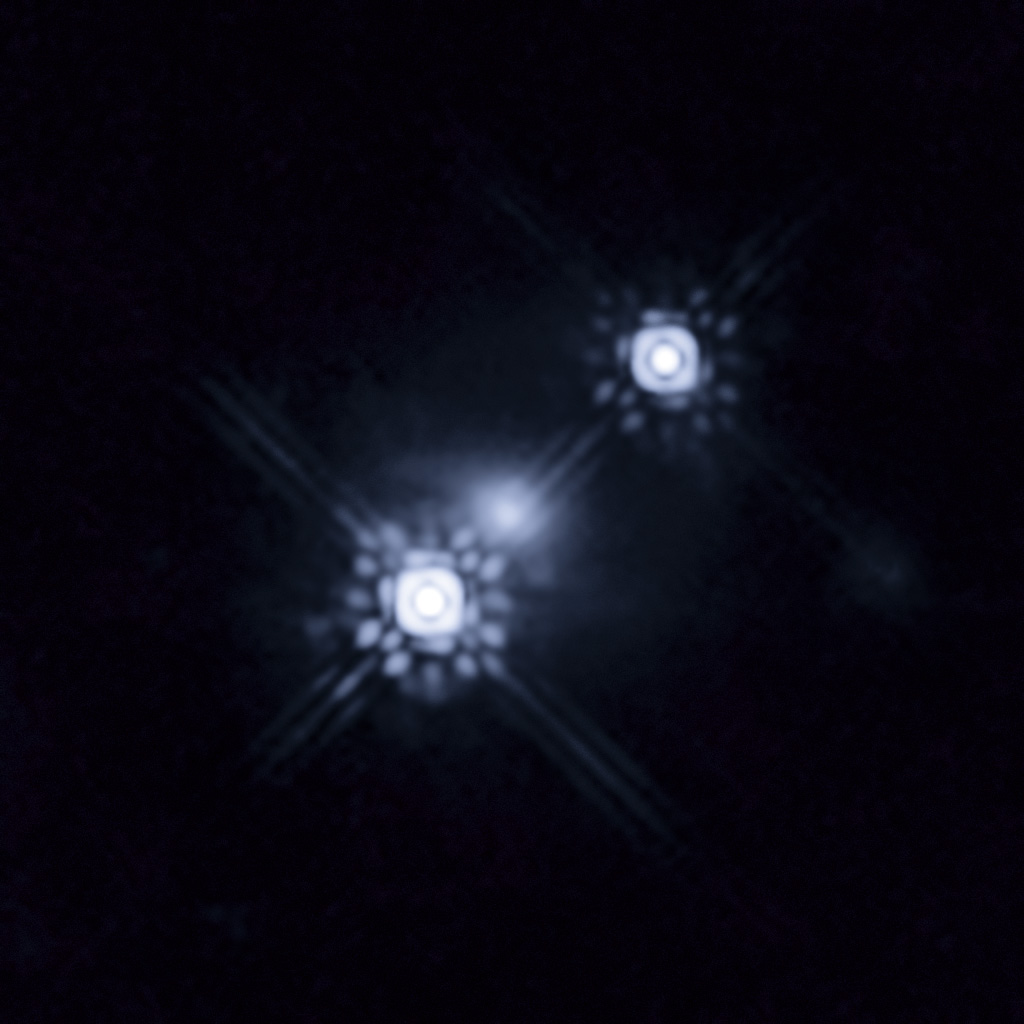
- Image of the gravitationally lensed quasar HE 1104−1805

Observation data (J2000.0 epoch)
- Constellation: Crater
- Right ascension: 11^{h} 06^{m} 33.40^{s}
- Declination: −18° 21′ 23.00″
- Redshift: 2.322200
- Heliocentric radial velocity: 696,178 km/s
- Distance: 10.490 Gly
- Apparent magnitude (V): 15.9
- Apparent magnitude (B): 15.8

Characteristics
- Type: RQQ

Other designations
- Name Double Hamburger, CTS 463, QSO B1104−181, INTREF 439, SDSS J110633.38−182123.7, TIC 410396549, 6dFGS gJ110633.5−182124

HE 1104−1805 known as CTS 463 or Double Hamburger in literature, is a gravitationally-lensed quasar located in the constellation of Crater. It has a redshift of (z) 2.32 and it was first discovered by astronomers L. Wisotzki, T. Koehler, R. Kayser and D. Reimers in October 1993. This quasar is classified as radio-quiet.

== Description ==
HE 1104−1805 is classified as a double quasar with an angular separation of 3.0 arcseconds and estimated B magnitudes of 16.70 and 18.74. When imaged, the quasar is found separated into two components, with the A component displaying emission lines of lower width, and a bluer continuum. It is found lensed by a foreground early-type galaxy described as large with a mass of 7 × 10^{11} M_{☉}. The redshift of the lens galaxy is (z) 0.729 ± 0.001 based on observations with the Very Large Telescope by C. Lidman while dismissing other redshift estimates of the galaxy at (z) 0.77 by C.Y. Peng based on the assumption of a fundamental plane measurement made by C.S. Kochanek and at (z) 1.66 by F. Courbin.

Combined observations with the Wise Observatory and by Schechter found the two images of HE 1104−1805 display time-delays. Based on results, the time delays are significantly shorter with a period of -161 ± 7 days while others estimated the time-delays between the ranges of -129 and -263 h^{−1} days, 0.73 years via a quantitative analysis, and between -0.9 and -0.7 years. Another study estimated an interband centroid time-delay of -4.3^{+3.1}_{-3.4} days.

Evidence also showed the light curves of the two images displaying a long-term variability trend, indicating it was caused by microlensing from the stars of the lens galaxy. Substantial variations were also noted in these images, although the B image has less fluctuations compared to the A image mainly because of the high dark matter concentration and low stellar surface density. Monitoring campaign observations made with Chandra X-ray Observatory in 2009, also detected the flux variability of the A image of HE 1104–1805 has a high amplitude in X-rays. As the variability is uncorrelated, this indicates microlensing.

The host galaxy of HE 1104−1805 is described as shaped into an Einstein Ring. It has a dusty appearance or little star formation based on scaling and addition of its arc imaging to both I and V images. Observations also pointed out the carbon oxide emission are found associated with the AGN's two point-like imaging with offset emission peaks. This suggests the AGN is not located in the molecular gas reservoir.

The central supermassive black hole of HE 1104−1805 is estimated to be 2.4 × 10^{9} M_{☉}. Other studies estimated the black hole mass as 9.37 ± 0.33, 8.77 ± 30 and 9.05 ± 0.23 based on estimation of its emission line widths. Several rich metallic systems of absorption lines have also been identified in the quasar's spectra with these lines being located at (z) 1.662, (z) 0.728 and (z) 1.320.

== Gallery ==
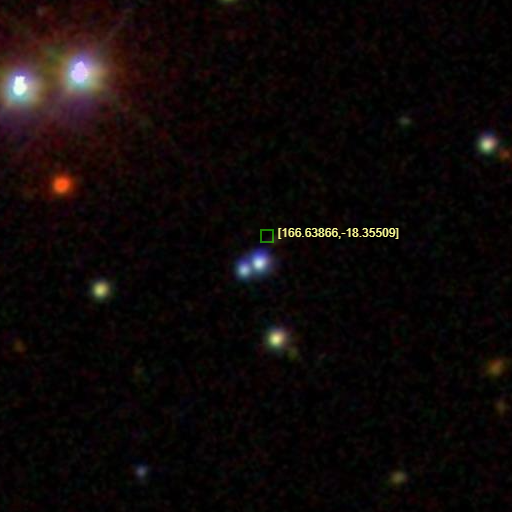
Sloan Digital Sky Survey image of HE 1104−1805.
