= HE 2149−2745 =

Gravitationally lensed quasar located in the Piscis Austrinus constellation

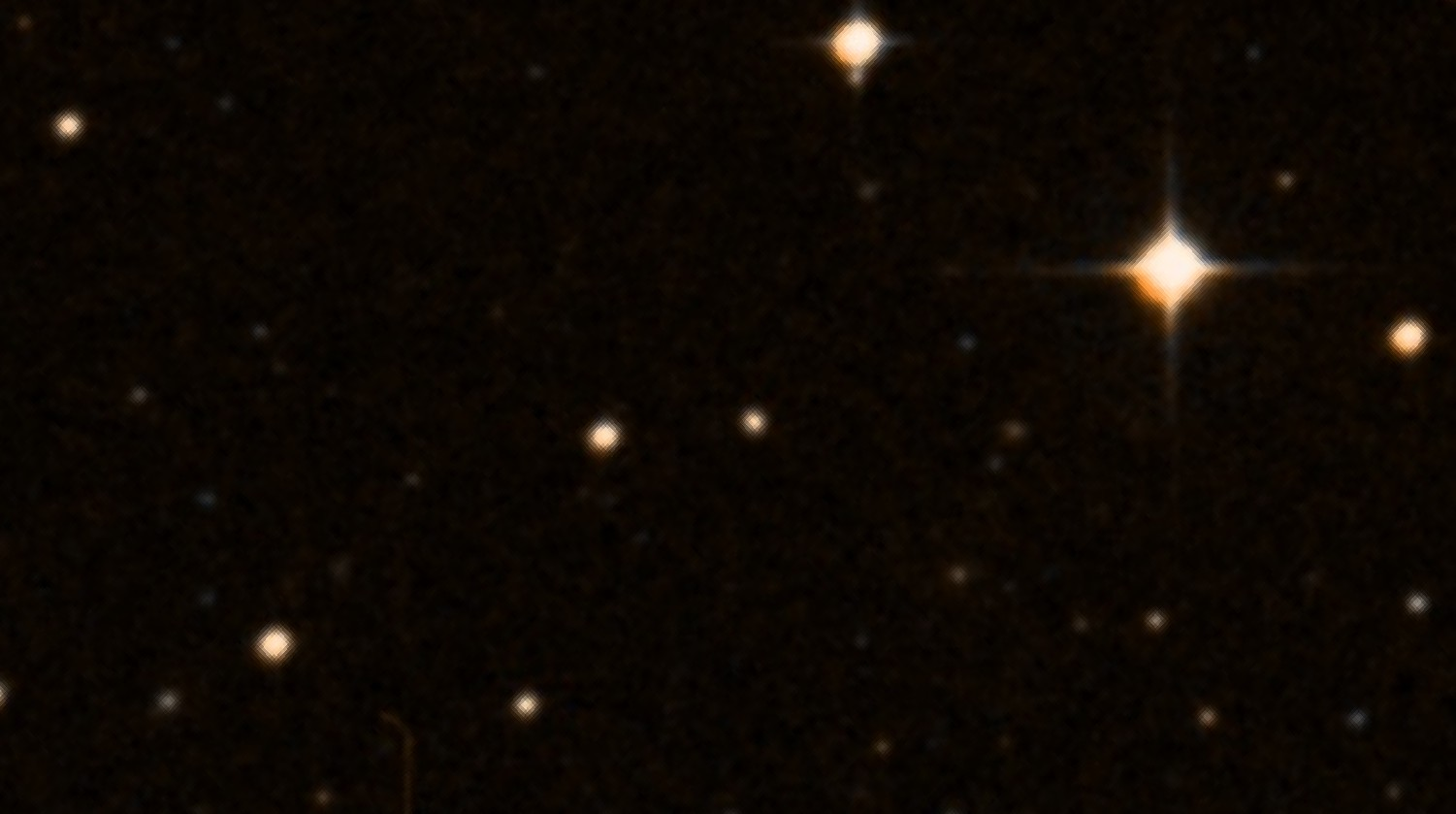
- Gravationally lensed quasar HE 2149−2745, as taken with DSS

Observation data (J2000.0 epoch)
- Constellation: Piscis Austrinus
- Right ascension: 21^{h} 52^{m} 07.40^{s}
- Declination: −27° 31′ 49.00″
- Redshift: 2.033000
- Heliocentric radial velocity: 609,478 km/s
- Distance: 10.103 Gly
- Apparent magnitude (V): +18.39
- Apparent magnitude (B): +18.70

Characteristics
- Type: QSO

Other designations
- QSO B2149−2745, 2MASS J21520747−2731497, 2QZ J215207.4−273150, QSO B2149−275, TIC 53893830, PGC 4023719

HE 2149−2745 is a strong gravitationally lensed quasar located in the southern constellation of Piscis Austrinus. It has a redshift of (z) 2.033 and was first discovered by astronomers in 1996. It is also classified as a broad absorption line (BAL) quasar as it shows absorption lines in its spectrum.

== Description ==
HE 2149−2745 is classified as a double quasar. When imaged, it is separated into two components with a separation gap of 1.7 arcseconds and each having B magnitudes of 17.3 and 19.0 respectively. The components also display P Cygni type emission or absorption profiles but found indistinguishable from one another. The lens galaxy of HE 2149−2745 is classified as an elliptical galaxy according to observations by Sebastian Lopez who estimated its redshift between (z) 0.3 and (z) 0.5. A spectroscopic result by A. Eigenbrod would later confirm the galaxy's redshift as (z) 0.603 although a redshift of (z) 0.495 is suggested. The lens mass of the galaxy is estimated to be 1.5(2.4) × 10^{11} M_{☉} with an R magnitude of 20.4. It is also suggested the lens galaxy might be part of a cluster given there are several other galaxies in R-band imaging.

The quasar displays time-delays. Based on results using the V-band light curve data obtained via the 1.5 meter telescope at La Silla Observatory, the time-delays are estimated as 103 ± 12 days, while dismissing later time-delay estimates of either 70–85 days or 100–110 days when observed by Eva Eulaers and Pierre Magain. Observations also found the A and B components have marginal differences of 1.635 ± 0.001 and 1.505 ± 0.003 magnitudes in both V and I-bands. Evidence points out the A component is much bluer than the B component, but the color differences doesn't vary in both components during the observation period. In addition, HE 2149−2745 displays some variations in its flux ratio showing fluctuations at 0.03 suggesting microlensing variability.

The broad-line region of HE 2149−2745 is observed. When studied by astronomers, the accretion disk size is found to be measured as 8^{+11}_{-5} M/M_{☉} light-days. An estimate of the size vs. wavelength exponent was calculated as 0.4 ± 0.3. Microlensing of its broad-line region is suggested, given evidence of absorbed doubly ionized carbon emission caused by time-variable absorption in both components. A supermassive black hole mass of 9.31 ± 0.93 M_{☉} has been found for the quasar.
