= PSO J030947.49+271757.31 =

Blazar in the constellation Aries

Observation data (Epoch J2000)
- Constellation: Aries
- Right ascension: 03^{h} 09^{m} 47.49^{s}
- Declination: +27° 17′ 57.31″
- Redshift: 6.1
- Distance: 12.7 billion ly (4.0 billion pc) (light travel distance); 27.6 billion ly (8.5 billion pc) (proper distance)
- Type: Blazar

Other designations
- PSO J0309+27

PSO J030947.49+271757.31, sometimes shortened to PSO J0309+27, is the most distant known blazar, as of 2020. It lies in Aries. The blazar has a redshift of 6.1, meaning its light took almost 13 billion years to reach Earth, when the universe was about 1 billion years old, and its present comoving distance is about 30 billion light-years. It was discovered by a team of researchers led by Silvia Belladitta, a Ph.D. student at the University of Insubria, working for the Italian National Institute for Astrophysics (INAF) in Milan, Italy.
