= FBQ 0951+2635 =

Gravitationally lensed quasar in the constellation of Leo

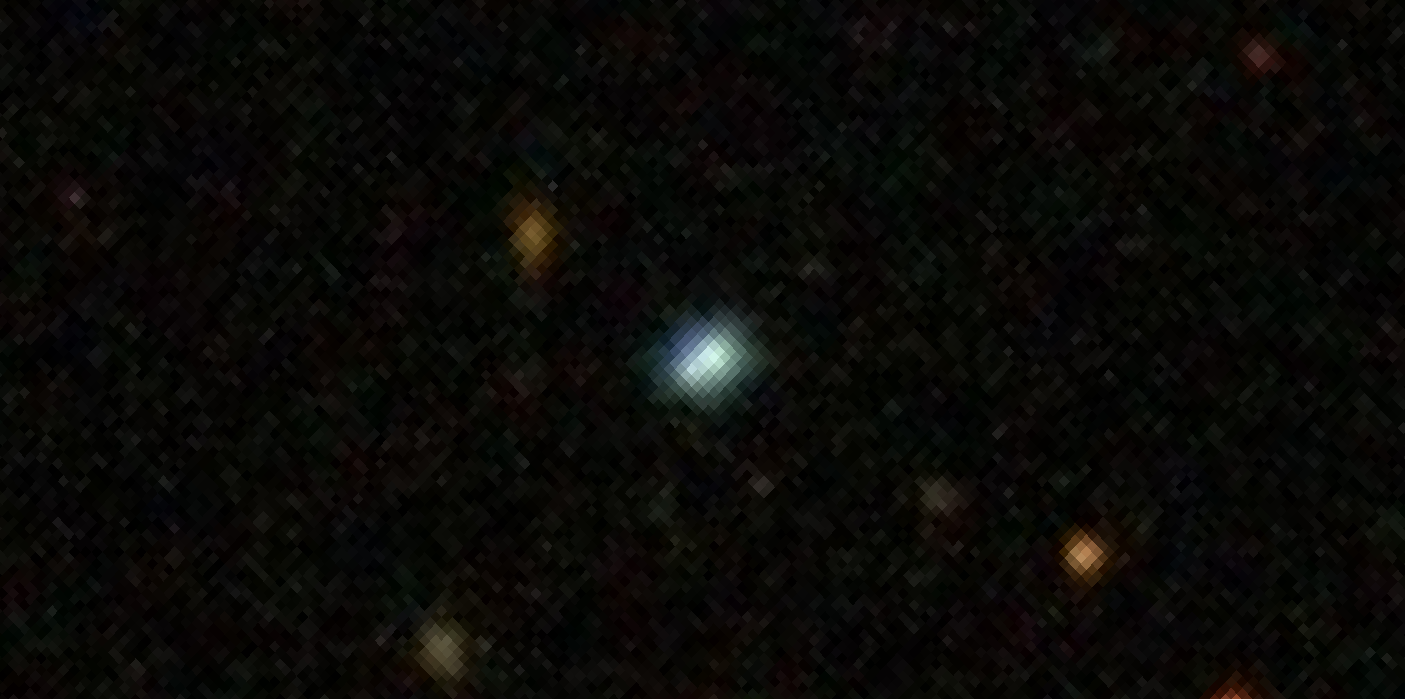
- SDSS image of FBQ 0951+2635

Observation data (J2000.0 epoch)
- Constellation: Leo
- Right ascension: 09^{h} 51^{m} 22.56^{s}
- Declination: +26° 35′ 14.05″
- Redshift: 1.247570
- Heliocentric radial velocity: 374,012 km/s
- Distance: 8.383 Gly
- Apparent magnitude (V): +17.31
- Apparent magnitude (B): +17.66

Characteristics
- Type: QSO

Other designations
- FBQS J0951+2635, SDSS J095122.58+263513.9, 2MASSI J0951225+263513, KODIAQ J095122+263513, RX J0951.4+2635, 1RXS J095122.5+263511

FBQ 0951+2635 is a gravitationally lensed quasar located in the constellation Leo. The redshift of the object is (z)=1.24, first discovered by Paul Schechter and his colleagues in April 1998 who obtained the observations from MDM Observatory which was formerly jointly operated by both Dartmouth College, University of Michigan and Massachusetts Institute of Technology.

== Description ==
FBQ 0951+2635 is classified as a double quasar with a B apparent magnitude of 16.9. When imaged by Schechter, the object is separated into two individual components (A and B), displaying a radio flux ratio of 4 to 1 and separated by 1.1 arcseconds from each other. Follow-up imaging using V and I-bands, have shown these two objects have the same color, with optical observations later discovering there is also a sole bright spot east from the A component and north from the B component. The lensing galaxy of FBQ 0951+2635 is classified as an early-type edge-on spiral galaxy located at (z) 0.260, based on measurements of the lens position on a fundamental plane. This lensing galaxy also displays a relatively low external sheer from a secondary lens deflector.

The quasar produces pronounced time-delays. Based on R-band light curve measurements using data obtained via Nordic Optical Telescope between March 1999 and June 2001, a short time-delay estimate of 16 ± 2 days was found, although other time-delay estimates put this between the range of 14.2 ± 2.5 and 26.3 ± 7.2 days. This is mainly attributed to the B component displaying a gradual rise, which in turn follows the rise in the A component. A decrease in flux was observed in the light curves during the last 100 days of observation.

Both components in FBQ 0951+2635 display a long-time-scale fluctuation, given the flux ratio displays both a quasi-flat trend and a bump during the period of 2003–2004, although the B component shows evidence of microlensing shifting both in time and in brightness levels, by -16 days and -1.06 magnitude. The object also shows X-ray variability in addition to time-delays.

Like all quasars, FBQ 0951+2635 is powered by a central supermassive black hole with a mass of 8.9 × 10^{8} M_{☉}. An observation of its continuum emission region at both wavelengths found the size is 16.24^{+0.33}_{-0.36} in R-band and 17.04^{+0.26}_{-0.30} in H-band with its assumed inclination angle of 60°. The slope of the accretion disk temperature profile is 0.50^{+0.50}_{-0.18} which is shallower but consistent with a standard thin-disk theory.
