= 4C 38.41 =

Quasar in the constellation Hercules

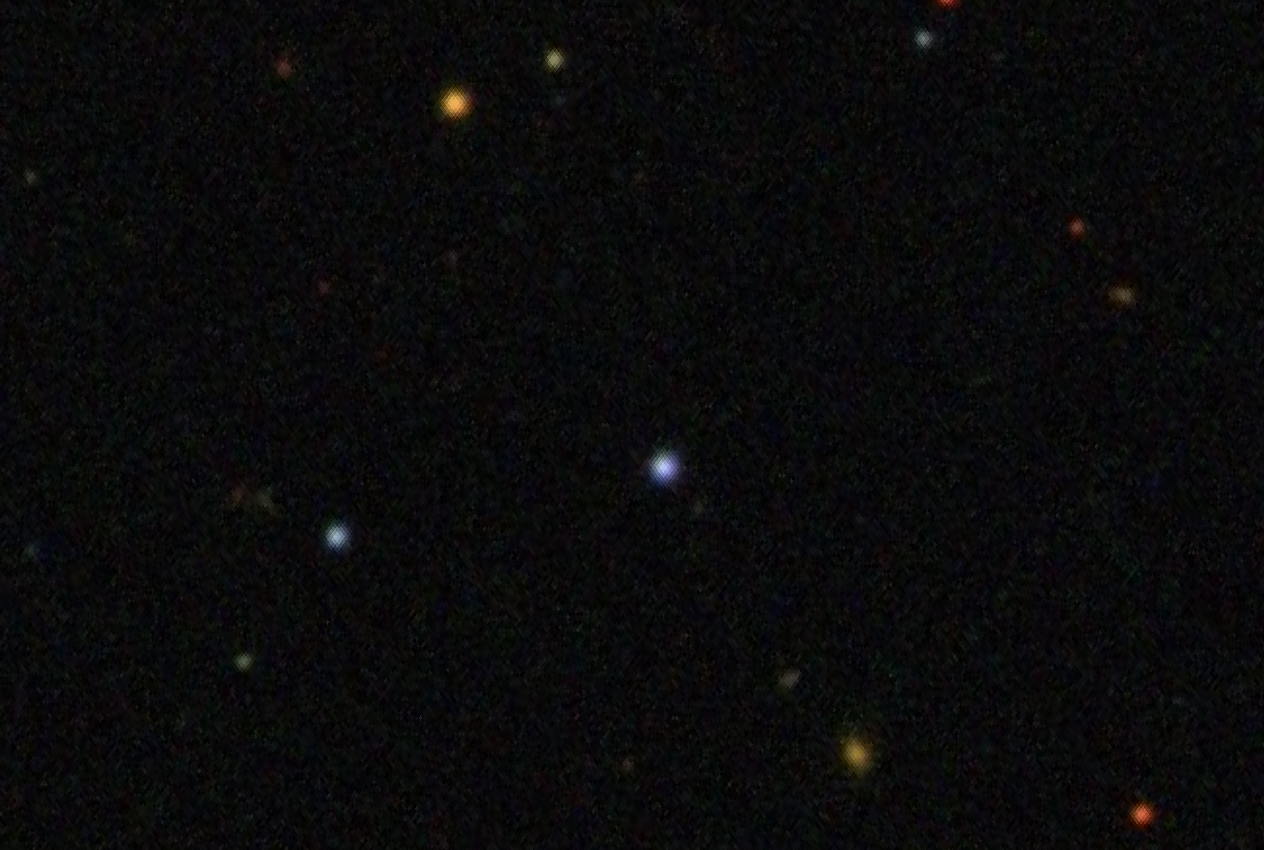
- SDSS image of 4C 38.41

Observation data (J2000.0 epoch)
- Constellation: Hercules
- Right ascension: 16^{h} 35^{m} 15.49^{s}
- Declination: +38° 08′ 04.50″
- Redshift: 1.813964
- Heliocentric radial velocity: 543,813 km/s
- Distance: 10.203 Gly
- Apparent magnitude (V): 17.97
- Apparent magnitude (B): 18.14

Characteristics
- Type: FSRQ;LPQ;HPQ blazar
- Size: ~209,000 ly (64.07 kpc) (estimated)

Other designations
- B3 1633+382, LEDA 2820574, OS +356, NVSS J163515+380804, SDSS J163515.50+380804.4, 2MASS J16351549+3808044, S4 1633+38, VIPS 0994, WMAP 033, JVAS J1635+3808

4C 38.41 known as B3 1633+382, is a quasar located in the constellation of Hercules. Its redshift is estimated to lie at (z) 1.813 and it was first discovered in September 1973 by astronomers led by Pauliny-Toth. They identified it as a compact 17th magnitude blue stellar object. It is also a notable blazar with a flat radio spectrum, making it a flat-spectrum radio quasar.

== Description ==
4C 38.41 is optically violently variable on the electromagnetic spectrum, thus classifying it as an OVV quasar. When observed during optical monitoring, it is known to display variations on both long-term and short-term scales, with the maximum variation in R-band magnitude reaching 0.78 and B-band 0.74. A faint state was initially observed at 17.55 magnitude, before rising to 16th magnitude during the next winter.

In July 2009, the object displayed gamma-ray activity when it entered a high-state with an estimated flux level of 1.38 ± 0.32 × 10^{−6} photons cm^{−2} s^{−1}. A near infrared flare was observed on 26 March 2011. On 3 September 2018, more gamma-ray emission was noted from the blazar by the AGILE Satellite, hinting it had undergone a new active violent phrase. Intraday-variability was observed in addition during the three days of observation between February 22 and 28, 2018, with it displaying a redder when brighter trend.

Radio imaging made by very-long-baseline interferometry (VLBI) found 4C 38.41 has a compact core-jet morphology structure comprising at least three components. When imaged at 608 MHz frequencies, a compact radio core is revealed with an extended structure going west right up to 20 milliarcseconds. Some structural extension has also been noted in other imaging, both east and towards the northwest, along a negative position angle of -35°. From the extended region of the object weak traces of radio emission are located west from the core. A weak polarized component was found, described as bright with hints of further extensions.

The radio jet of 4C 38.41 is described as extended by 50 milliarcseconds towards the west direction with a sharp bend at the south. This jet might be suggested weak when imaged by a 2.3 GHz radio image by VLBI. Superluminal motion is also detected in the jet, given a jet component is shown moving with a proper motion of 0.14 ± 0.06 milliarcseconds per year. In 2019, astronomers found the structure of the inner jet part show a semi-parabolic geometry shape. The jet regions never follow a ballistic trajectory direction, instead matching with a sinusoidal pattern. This might arise from either jet precession in helical motion or if the jet is unstable.

Observations conducted in June 2023, found 4C 38.41 has evidence of quasi-periodic oscillations (QPO) with most of its activity phrases showing them with a duration period between 10 and 110 days. Further evidence also noted one of the active phases has three further subphases with the same observed oscillations lasting between 10 and 40 days. When observed in a quiescent phase, more QPO-like behavior is discovered on two time-scales. This indicates kink instability or its curved model. A supermassive black hole mass of 10.1 M_{☉} has been estimated for the object.
