= CID-42 =

Galaxy quasar in the constellation Sextans

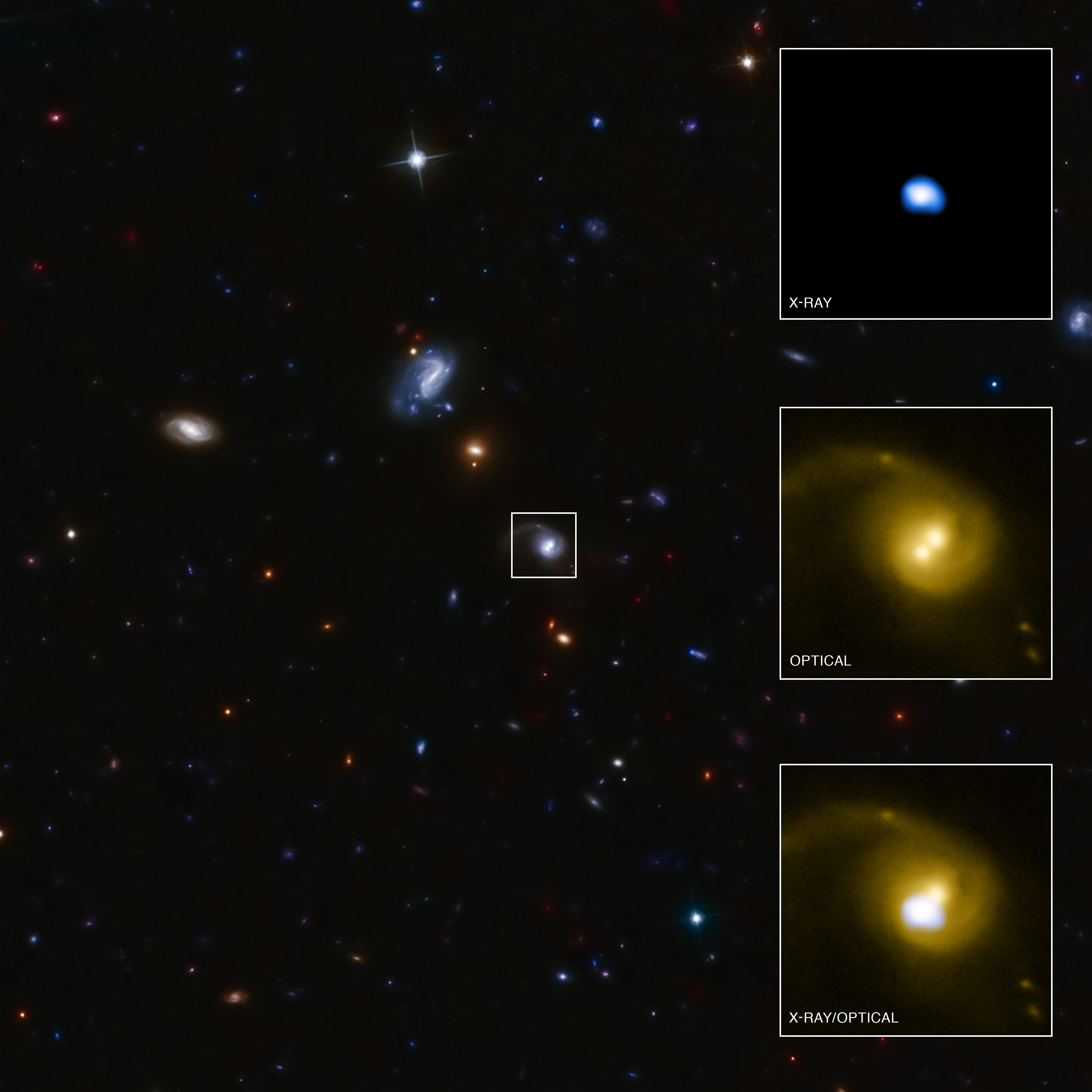
- Optical and X-ray images of CID-42

Observation data (J2000 epoch)
- Constellation: Sextans
- Right ascension: 10^{h} 00^{m} 43.13^{s}
- Declination: +02° 06′ 37.40″
- Redshift: 0.359
- Heliocentric radial velocity: 89302 km/s
- Distance: 3.9 billion
- Apparent magnitude (V): ?

Characteristics
- Type: Spiral
- Mass: 4.5×10^{11} M_{☉}
- Number of stars: ?
- Apparent size (V): ?

Other designations
- CXOC J100043.1+020637 2XMM J100043.1+020637

CID-42 (also known as CXOC J100043.1+020637) is a galaxy quasar about 3.9 billion light years away in the constellation Sextans. It is believed to have a supermassive black hole at its center.

== Description ==
CID-42 is thought to be the result of a galaxy collision between two smaller galaxies. It has a distinctive trail of stars extending many light years.

== Black hole ==
The discovery of a potential black hole was made after combining through the data and images taken by several telescopes including NASA's Chandra X-ray Observatory, the Hubble Space Telescope, the Canada-France-Hawaii Telescope and from the ground-based Magellan and Very Large Telescopes in Chile.

When the two galaxies collided the black holes in their centers collided, forming a single supermassive black hole. The black hole then recoiled from the gravitational waves produced by the merger and is being ejected out of the galaxy at several million miles per hour (~2000 km s^{−1}).

Once ejected it is expected to shine as a displaced quasar for 10 million to 10 billion years until it exhausts its fuel and is no longer recognizable as a quasar.

JWST NIRCam observations were able to rule out the gravitational wave producing recoiling black hole sencario. Instead CID-42 is a merging galaxy with only one active galactic nucleus.
