= QSO J1427+3312 =

Quasar with high redshift

QSO J1427+3312 is a radio-loud quasar that lies at a redshift z=6.12. This object is one of the highest redshift radio-loud quasars discovered. Observation of QSO J1427+3312 suggests that it might be a compact symmetric object that is surrounded by a dense interstellar medium in the host galaxy.

The brightness temperature of QSO J1427+3312 is of order 10^{7} to 10^{8} K.
