= 3C 47 =

Seyfert galaxy

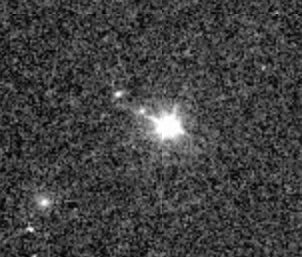
- Hubble Legacy Archive WFPC2 image of 3C 47

Observation data (Epoch J2000)
- Constellation: Pisces
- Right ascension: 01^{h} 36^{m} 24.42^{s}
- Declination: +20° 57′ 27.5″
- Redshift: 0.425
- Distance: 4.3 billion light-years (Light travel time); 5.2 billion light-years (present); 2322 Mpc
- Type: Sy1; FR II; QSO
- Apparent magnitude (V): 18.1

Other designations
- LEDA 2817500, 4C 20.07, 3C 47, QSO B0133+20

3C 47 is a Seyfert galaxy / lobe-dominated quasar located in the constellation Pisces. It was the first quasar found with the classic double radio-lobe structure.
