= Q1208+1011 =

Distant quasar

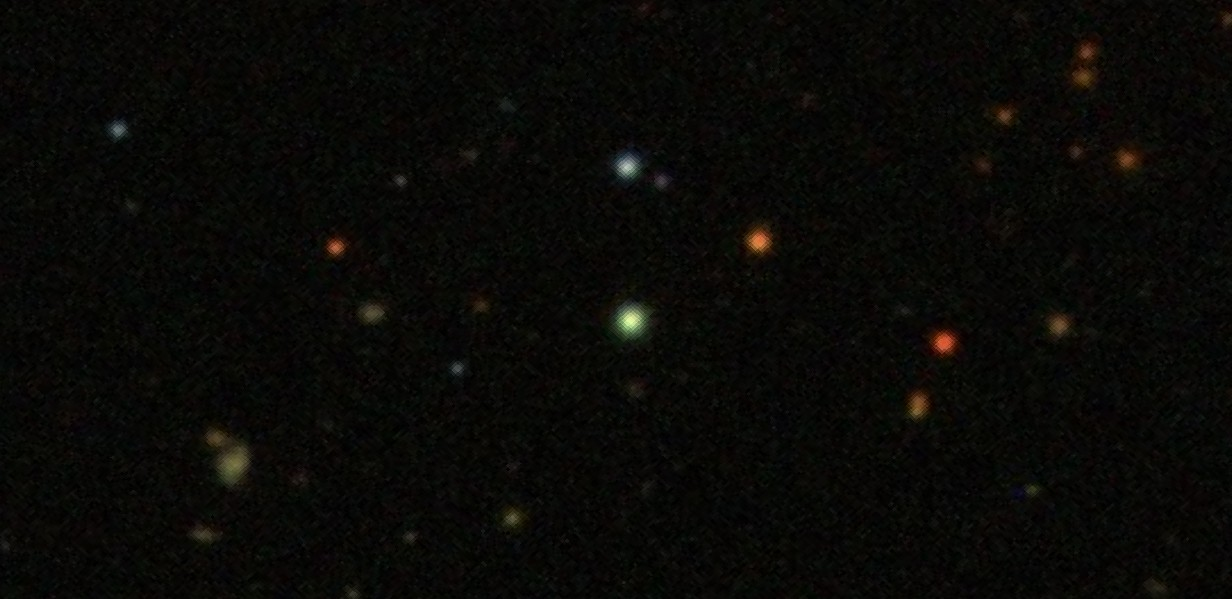
- SDSS image of Q1208+1011.

Observation data (Epoch J2000)
- Right ascension: 12^{h} 10^{m} 57.0369007056^{s}
- Declination: +09° 54′ 27.069784092″
- Redshift: 3.80

Q1208+1011 is a gravitationally-lensed quasar discovered in April 1986 by Hazard, McMahon and Sargent. It has a redshift of 3.80, and was the most distant astronomical object ever observed at the time of its discovery.
