= SBS 1425+606 =

Quasar in the constellation Ursa Major

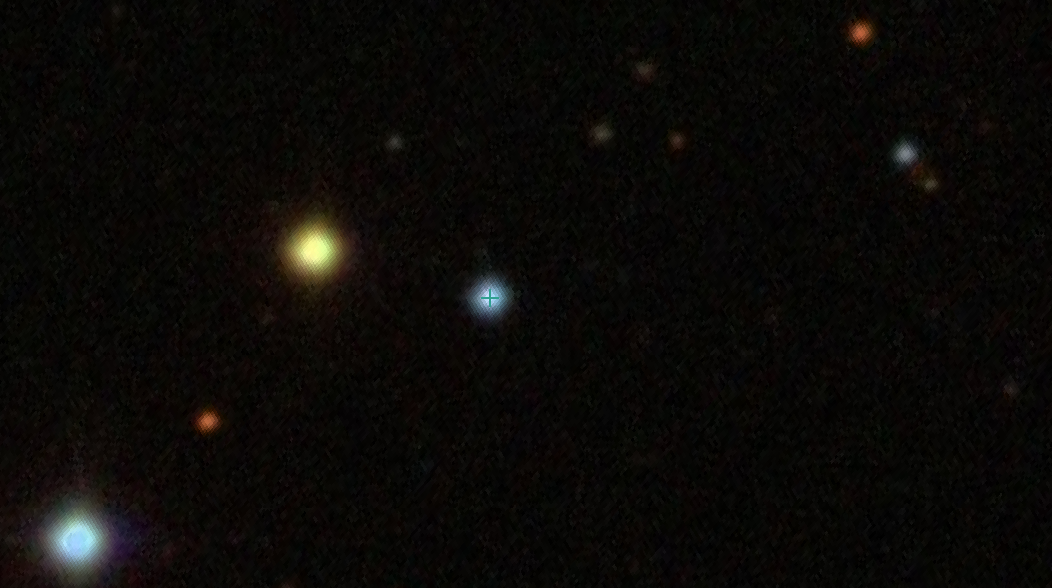
- Image of SBS 1425+606 taken by Sloan Digital Sky Survey

Observation data (J2000.0 epoch)
- Constellation: Ursa Major
- Right ascension: 14h 26m 56.178s
- Declination: +60d 25m 50.87s
- Redshift: 3.197157
- Heliocentric radial velocity: 958,484 km/s
- Distance: 11.4 Gly (light travel time distance)
- Apparent magnitude (V): 0.032
- Apparent magnitude (B): 0.043
- Surface brightness: 16.5

Characteristics
- Type: DLA, HiBAL
- Notable features: Quasar with high luminosity

Other designations
- 2MASS J14265618+6025508, HS 1425+6039, 2MASSi J1426561+602550, WISEA J142656.18+602550.8, PGC 4046493, KODIAQ J142656+602550, SDSS J142656.17+602550.8, QSO B1425+606

SBS 1425+606 also known as HS 1425+6039 and QSO B1425+606, is a quasar located in the constellation Ursa Major. Its redshift is 3.197157, putting the object at a light travel time distance of 11.4 billion light years.

== Observational history ==
SBS 1425+606 was first discovered in 1996 via a spectroscopy study which a team of astronomers from the Second Byurakan Survey, found there are 76 quasars; among them is SBS 1425+606, a hundred subdwarf stars and a BL Lac object.

== Characteristics ==
SBS 1425+606 is one of the most energetic quasars observed in the universe at redshift >3. It has an absolute magnitude of -31.5 or 10^{41} watts which the intense luminosity is caused by its accretion disk. The supermassive black hole in SBS 1425+606 propels matter in the speed of light, given the speed of gases and friction between atoms, reaches up to high temperature affecting ionization of gas and increasing its luminosity.

SBS 1425+606 is classified as a broad absorption line quasar. It shows an ultraviolet absorption that is hundreds of km/s wide, with a redshifted trough extending up to a velocity of v ≃ 12,000 km/s. These large widths are mainly the cause by its own accretion process. Broad absorption line quasars such as SBS 1425+606, tend to show a unique morphology which they have gas clouds absorbing fluxes at wavelengths of common quasar spectral features, although their blueshifted velocities exceeds up to 0.1c. BAL features are interesting as they provide signatures of significant feedback, but also compromise cosmological studies with quasars by their impact on accurate redshifts and measurements of the matter density distribution which is traced by the Lyman-alpha forest.

According to observations by researchers, they noted there is a strong existence of a moderately strong damped Lyα absorption system in SBS 1425+606, located at redshift 2.83. This is tentatively identified a possible broad absorption line, in the discovery spectrum. Voigt profiles superposed on the data suggests the column density the "Lyα disk" is N(HI)~2.5 × 10^{20}/cm^{2}. Further observations by 4 m class telescopes from ESO in Chile and Observatorio del Roque de los Muchachos in Spain, found out there is presence of nitrogen lines of the N I λ1134 and λ1200 multiplets, offering a considerable range in oscillator strengths and the possibility of disentangling Lyα interlopers.

SBS 1425+606 is shown to have an extended Lyman-α emission around its bright nucleus, which its total Ly-α luminosities corresponds to ~0.5% of the luminosities from its broad Lyα emission lines making an order of magnitude smaller as compared to those in radio-loud spectrum quasars. By studying SBS 1425+606, it is an important factor in determining the formation of high redshift massive galaxies, which they form stars through large amounts of gas, that falls in to feed the quasar. By balancing the evolution of massive galaxies between infall and feedback mechanisms, both are equally important for galaxy formation.
