= 3C 254 =

Quasar in the constellation Ursa Major

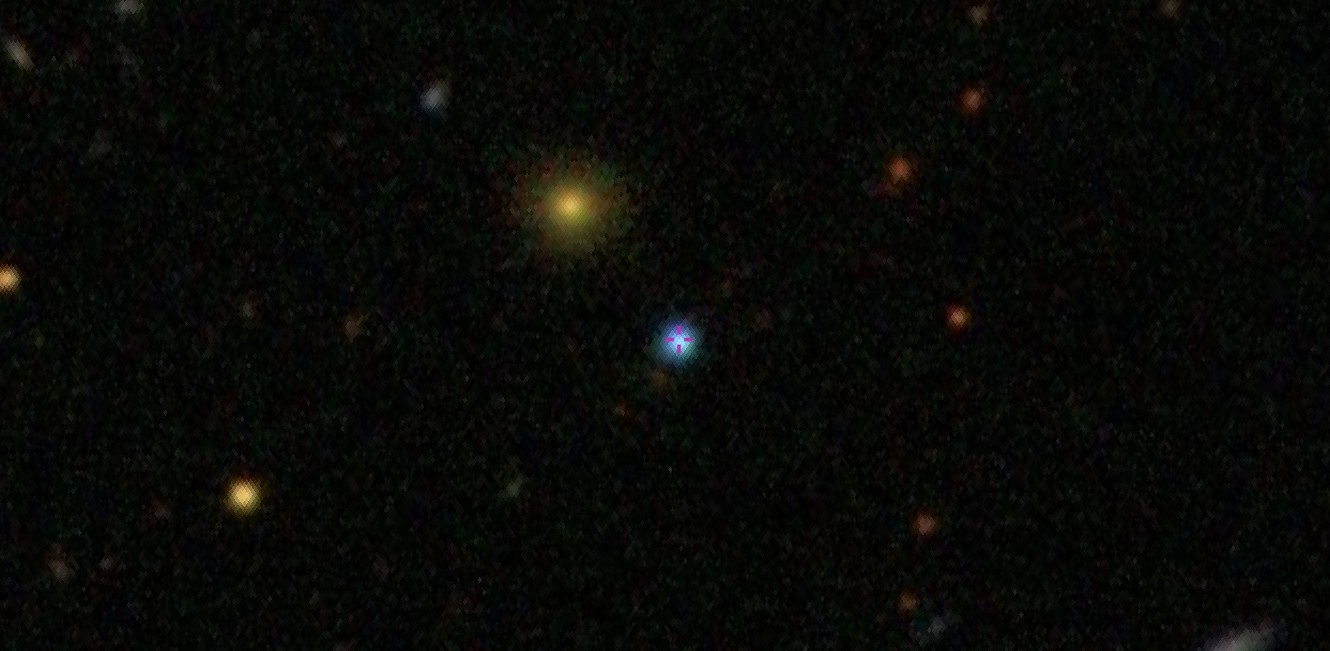
- The quasar 3C 254. Above the object is the galaxy, 2MASS J11143975+4037350.

Observation data (J2000.0 epoch)
- Constellation: Ursa Major
- Right ascension: 11^{h} 14^{m} 38.7241^{s}
- Declination: +40° 37′ 20.285″
- Redshift: 0.735926
- Heliocentric radial velocity: 220,625 km/s
- Distance: 6.318 Gly
- Apparent magnitude (V): 17.42
- Apparent magnitude (B): 17.62

Characteristics
- Type: RL1

Other designations
- 4C 40.18, DA 298, LEDA 2817631, NRAO 369, QSO J1114+4037, 2E 2426

3C 254 is a radio-loud quasar located in the constellation of Ursa Major. The object has a redshift of (z) 0.734 and is classified as a Fanaroff-Riley class type II source. It was first identified by astronomers as an astronomical radio source in 1965.

== Description ==
3C 254 contains an asymmetrical radio structure consisting of two radio lobes and a central component. Its radio spectrum is found straight and steep. When imaged by MERLIN (Multi-Element Radio-linked Interferometer Network) at 1539 MHz, the western lobe is made up of two hotspots, a compact primary hotspot and a more diffused secondary hotspot with an approximate peak brightness of 36 mJy. In addition, the western lobe is found to be significantly polarized compared to the eastern lobe, whose emission is less compact and stretching in a south-east direction. A study published in 1982 showed both lobes of 3C 254 are extended. There is also an eastern component found perpendicular towards the axis of the source, interpreted as a side-flow.

The host galaxy of 3C 354 according to imaging by Hubble Space Telescope (HST), has a complex morphology. It is orientated in an east-west direction, showing traces of emission plumes along the position angles of 285° and 45°. Further evidence also showed the object is surrounded by a number of faint objects, suggesting it might belong in a galaxy cluster.

An extended emission-line region has been discovered around 3C 254. Based on observations, the region is extended by 80 kiloparsecs (kpc). Further evidence also showed there are signs of kinematics and intensity in its emission lines, hinting the jet is interacting with a gas cloud. A secondary X-ray emission source was discovered although an optical counterpart wasn't found.
