= CLASS B1359+154 =

Quasar in the constellation Boötes

Observation data (Epoch J2000)
- Constellation: Boötes
- Right ascension: 14^{h} 01^{m} 35.60^{s}
- Declination: +15° 13′ 25.0″
- Redshift: 3.235
- Apparent magnitude (V): 21.9
- Notable features: Six-image lens, noted [MRF99] CLASS B1359+154 A, A to F

Other designations
- QSO B1359+154

CLASS B1359+154 is a quasar, or quasi-stellar object, that has a redshift of 3.235. A group of three foreground galaxies at a redshift of about 1 are behaving as gravitational lenses. The result is a rare example of a sixfold multiply imaged quasar.

== See also ==
- Twin Quasar
- Einstein Cross
