= SDSS J1004+4112 =

Gravitational lensed quasar in the constellation Leo Minor

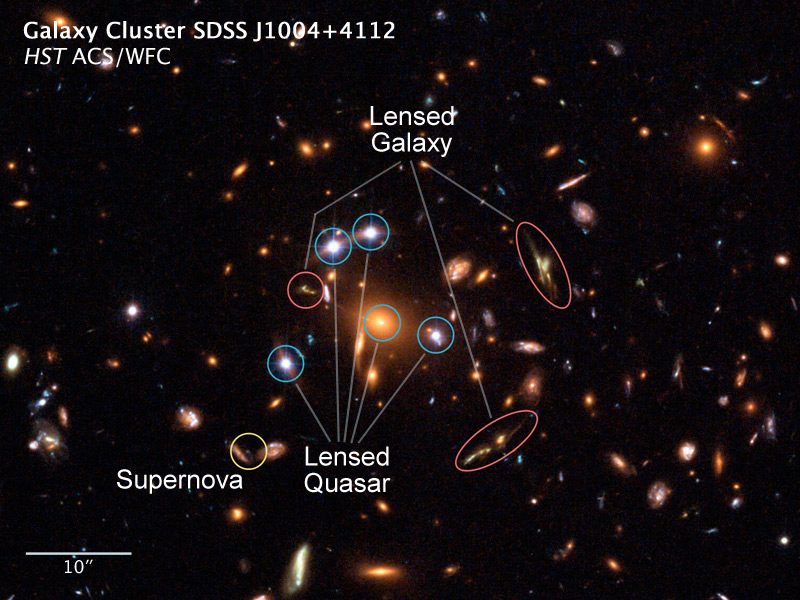
- HST image of SDSS J1004+4112.

Observation data (J2000.0 epoch)
- Constellation: Leo Minor
- Right ascension: 10^{h} 04^{m} 34.93^{s}
- Declination: +41° 12′ 42.66″
- Redshift: 1.738167
- Heliocentric radial velocity: 521,089 km/s
- Distance: 10 Gly
- Apparent magnitude (V): 19.03
- Apparent magnitude (B): 19.14

Characteristics
- Type: QSO

Other designations
- RBS 0825, SDSS J100434.82+411239.5, 2CXO JJ100434.9+411242, 1RXS J100434.9+411245

SDSS J1004+4112 is a gravitationally-lensed quasar located in the constellation of Leo Minor. It has a redshift of (z) 1.73 indicating a light-travel time distance of 10 billion light-years. This object was first discovered by a team of astronomers in December 2003.

== Description ==
SDSS J1004+4112 is classified a quadruple imaged quasar with a separation of 14.62 arcseconds. When imaged, it is separated into four components and lensed by a foreground galaxy cluster located at a redshift of (z) 0.68 based on follow-up imaging observations by Subaru Telescope, making this the first known object lensed by a cluster. A fifth image was discovered by astronomers based on a detection of a faint source located inside of the brightest cluster galaxy in the cluster. Further observations also showed there are seven other imaged galaxies behind SDSS J1004+4112 and the cluster, one of them located at (z) 3.332.

Astronomers have found SDSS J1004+4112 displays multiple time delays. Based on optical monitoring data results by J. Fohlmeister, the time delay between the A and B components were calculated as 38.4 ± 2.0 days with B as the leading component. Later in 2008, Fohlmeister would measure the time delays again and found the C component has a time-delay of 2.3 years while also refining the time delay value of A and B components as 40.6 ± 1.8 days. An estimate of 2457 days was found for the D component lagging behind C, making this the longest known measured time delay. Astronomers also noted the A and B components showed evidence of microlensing with flux ratios switching from 0.44 ± 0.01 magnitude to 0.29 ± 0.01 magnitude and vice versa.

Spectroscopy observations conducted in 2004 showed the quasar's spectra shows emission lines differences between the lens images. When probed, the A component displayed signs of strong enhancement in the emission line wing of its ionization lines, indicating the evidence of microlensing of the broad emission line region. A 28-day long amplification period was recorded for the emission lines of the A component.

A study published in 2019 showed that the four components of SDSS J1004+4112 display polarization. Based on spectroscopy and polarimetric observations, astronomers noted the A and B components have a polarization angle of 40-50° while the polarization angle for the C and D components is 140°. They also noted the D component displays a significant fraction of polarization variability.

The quasar is found to display X-ray emission from the lens images based on Chandra X-ray observations and has a supermassive black hole mass of 10^{8.4 ± 0.2} M_{☉} based on a magnesium emission line width. There are also detections of both redshifted and blueshifted lines from the quasar with the quasar's half-light radius of the accretion disk estimated as (0.70 ± 0.04)R_{E} = (6.4 ± 0.4) light-days.
