= PHL 293B =

Galaxy in the constellation Aquarius

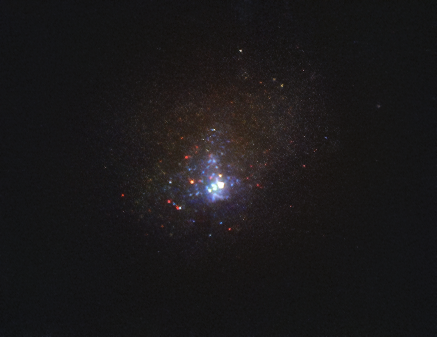
- Hubble Space Telescope image of PHL 293B; the purported luminous blue variable is located near the core of the galaxy

Observation data (J2000 epoch)
- Constellation: Aquarius
- Right ascension: 22^{h} 30^{m} 36.8^{s}
- Declination: −00° 06′ 37″
- Redshift: 0.0051
- Heliocentric radial velocity: 1,606 km/s
- Galactocentric velocity: 1,723±10 km/s
- Distance: 75.51 ± 8.072 Mly (23.150 ± 2.475 Mpc)
- Apparent magnitude (V): 16.87
- Apparent magnitude (B): 17.35

Characteristics
- Type: compact Im? HII
- Size: 5,450 ly × 4,960 ly (1.67 kpc × 1.52 kpc) (diameter; 25.0 B-mag arcsec^{−2}) (Note: The quick-look major axis physical diameter given by NED were based on a distance estimate of 23.150 ± 2.475 Mpc (75.51×10^{6} ± 8.072×10^{6} ly) using a scale of 112.2 parsec/arcsec multiplied with given angular diameters.)
- Apparent size (V): 0.24′ × 0.20′

Other designations
- Kinman's Dwarf, PGC 69018

PHL 293B star
Observation data Epoch J1950 Equinox ICRS
- Constellation: Aquarius
- Right ascension: 22^{h} 28.1^{m}
- Declination: −0° 22′

Characteristics
- Evolutionary stage: Luminous blue variable?

Astrometry
Radial velocity (R_{v})	(of galaxy) 1,606 km/s
Distance	23,150,000±2,475,000 pc

Details
Radius	1,348–1,463 R_{☉}
Luminosity	2,500,000–3,500,000 L_{☉}
Temperature	6,000–6,800 K

Other designations
- SDSS J2230–0006, SDSS J223036.79-000636.9, A2228-00

Database references
SIMBAD	PHL 293B
- PHL 293 (Simbad mistakenly showing results for PHL 293B)

PHL 293B, also known as Kinman's dwarf, is a low-metallicity blue compact dwarf galaxy about 23.15 megaparsecs (75.51 million light-years) from the Earth in the constellation Aquarius.

It had a very likely associated, notable, blue-light, long-lived star with constant outbursts or a large supernova observed to have faded and which then disappeared. Although this bright visible jet-producing object responsible for broad hydrogen emission lines with P Cygni profiles was widely considered to be a luminous blue variable ejecting matter, other studies posited the mentioned, competing, explanations for the bright light source within.

== Observation history ==
PHL 293 was first listed as entry 293 in a catalogue of faint blue stars published by Guillermo Haro and Willem Jacob Luyten in 1962. In 1965, Thomas Kinman observed two faint possible companions to it, about 1′ away, which he dubbed A and B. HL 293B, sometimes called Kinman's Dwarf, was noted to be an extragalactic, nonstellar object, with a jet, approximately 22.6 Mpc away from Earth. The acronym PHL has since been applied to distinguish it from other HL catalogues; it is most commonly referred to by astronomers as PHL 293B. The galaxy was identified as a blue compact dwarf, a type of small irregular galaxy undergoing a strong burst of star formation.

The spectrum of PHL 293B is unusual both for its low metallicity and for broad hydrogen emission lines with P Cygni profiles. These are interpreted as being from a large luminous blue variable star in the galaxy. The star is believed to have been undergoing an outburst during previous observations, an interpretation is disputed by some publications. An alternative explanation would be a long-lived type IIn supernova, similar to the transient event of SDSS1133. These emission features in the spectrum of the galaxy faded during 2019 and by the end of the year had disappeared (at least visibly), likely due to the disappearance of a bright star of the galaxy.

== See also ==
- AG Carinae
- Markarian 177
- LBV 1806-20
- Eta Carinae
