= Hypercompact stellar system =

Cluster of stars around a supermassive black hole

A hypercompact stellar system (HCSS) is a dense cluster of stars around a supermassive black hole that has been ejected from the center of its host galaxy. Stars that are close to the black hole at the time of the ejection will remain bound to the black hole after it leaves the galaxy, forming the HCSS.

The term "hypercompact" refers to the fact HCSSs are small in size compared with ordinary star clusters of similar luminosity. This is because the gravitational force from the supermassive black hole keeps the stars moving in very tight orbits about the center of the cluster.

The luminous X-ray source SDSS 1133 near the galaxy Markarian 177 would be the first candidate for an HCSS. Finding an HCSS would confirm the theory of gravitational wave recoil, and would prove that supermassive black holes can exist outside galaxies.

== Properties ==
Astronomers believe that supermassive black holes (SMBHs) can be ejected from the centers of galaxies by gravitational wave recoil. This happens when two SMBHs in a binary system coalesce, after losing energy in the form of gravitational waves. Because the gravitational waves are not emitted isotropically, some momentum is imparted to the coalescing black holes, and they feel a recoil, or "kick," at the moment of coalescence. Computer simulations suggest that the kick can be as large as 10^{4} km/s, which exceeds escape velocity from the centres of even the most massive galaxies.

Stars that are orbiting around the SMBH at the moment of the kick will be dragged along with the SMBH, provided their orbital velocity exceeds the kick velocity V_{k}. This is what determines the size of the HCSS: its radius is roughly the radius of the orbit that has the same velocity around the SMBH as the kick velocity, or

$$R=\frac{GM}{V_k^2}$$

where M is the mass of the SMBH and G the gravitational constant. The size R works out to be roughly one-half parsec (pc) (two light-years) for a kick of 1000 km/s and a SMBH mass of 100 million solar masses. The largest HCSSs would have sizes of about 20 pc, roughly the same as a large globular cluster, and the smallest would be about a thousandth of a parsec across, smaller than any known star cluster.

The number of stars that remain bound to the SMBH after the kick depends both on V_{k}, and on how densely the stars were clustered about the SMBH before the kick. A number of arguments suggest that the total stellar mass would be roughly 0.1% of the mass of the SMBH or less. The biggest HCSSs would carry perhaps a few million stars, making them comparable in luminosity to a globular cluster or ultra-compact dwarf galaxy.

Aside from being very compact, the main difference between an HCSS and an ordinary star cluster is the much greater mass of the HCSS, due to the SMBH at its centre. The SMBH itself is dark and undetectable, but its gravity causes the stars to move at much higher velocities than in an ordinary star cluster. Normal star clusters have internal velocities of a few kilometers per second, while in an HCSS, essentially all the stars are moving faster than V_{k}, i.e. hundreds or thousands of kilometers per second. Because the stars are bound to the potential of the central black hole rather than their mutual self-gravity, the internal velocity dispersion of the cluster is directly determined by the amplitude of the kick velocity, independent of when the kick occurred.

If the kick velocity is less than the escape velocity from the galaxy, the SMBH will fall back toward the galaxy nucleus, oscillating many times through the galaxy before finally coming to rest. In this case, the HCSS would only exist as a distinct object for a relatively short time, of order hundreds of millions of years, before disappearing back into the galaxy nucleus. During this time the HCSS would be difficult to detect since it would be superimposed on or behind the galaxy.

Even if an HCSS escapes from its host galaxy, it will remain bound to the group or cluster that contains the galaxy, since the escape velocity from a cluster of galaxies is much larger than that from a single galaxy. When observed, the HCSS will be moving more slowly than V_{k}, since it will have climbed out through the gravitational potential well of the galaxy and/or cluster.

The stars in an HCSS would be similar to the types of stars that are observed in galactic nuclei. This would make the stars in an HCSS more metal-rich and younger than the stars in a typical globular cluster.

== Search ==
Since the black hole at the center of the HCSS is essentially invisible, an HCSS would look very similar to a faint cluster of stars. Determining that an observed star cluster is an HCSS requires measuring the orbital velocities of the stars in the cluster via their Doppler shifts and verifying that they are moving much faster than expected for stars in an ordinary star cluster. This is a challenging observation to make because an HCSS would be relatively faint, requiring many hours of exposure time even on a 10m class telescope.

The most promising places to look for HCSSs are clusters of galaxies, for two reasons: first, most of the galaxies in a galaxy cluster are elliptical galaxies which are believed to have formed through mergers. A galaxy merger is a prerequisite for forming a binary SMBH, which is a prerequisite for a kick. Second, the escape velocity from a galaxy cluster is large enough that an HCSS would be retained even if it escaped from its host galaxy.

It has been estimated that the nearby Fornax and Virgo galaxy clusters may contain hundreds or thousands of HCSSs. These galaxy clusters have been surveyed for compact galaxies and star clusters. It is possible that some of the objects picked up in these surveys were HCSSs that were misidentified as ordinary star clusters. A few of the compact objects in the surveys are known to have rather high internal velocities, but none appear to be massive enough to qualify as HCSSs.

Another likely place to find an HCSS would be near the site of a recent galaxy merger.

From time to time, the black hole at the center of an HCSS will disrupt a star that passes too close, producing a very luminous flare. A few such flares have been observed at the centers of galaxies, presumably caused by a star coming too close to the SMBH in the galaxy nucleus. It has been estimated that a recoiling SMBH will disrupt about a dozen stars during the time it takes to escape from its galaxy. Since the lifetime of a flare is a few months, the chances of seeing such an event are small unless a large volume of space is surveyed. A star in an HCSS could also explode as a Type I (white dwarf) supernova.

== Importance ==
Discovery of an HCSS would be important for several reasons.

- It would constitute proof that supermassive black holes can exist outside galaxies.
- It would verify the computer simulations that predict gravitational wave recoils of thousands of kilometers per second.
- Existence of HCSSs would imply that some galaxies do not have supermassive black holes at their centers. This would have important consequences for theories that link the growth of galaxies to the growth of supermassive black holes, and for empirical correlations between SMBH mass and galaxy properties.
- If many HCSSs could be discovered, it would be possible to reconstruct the distribution of kick velocities, which contains information about the merger history of galaxies, the masses and spins of binary black holes, etc.

== See also ==
- Numerical relativity
- Stellar dynamics
- Rogue black hole
