= Central massive object =

Central object of a galaxy

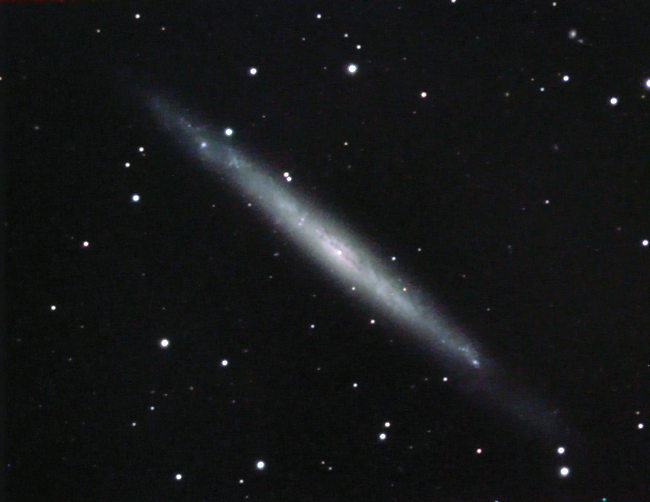
- The star-like nucleus at the centre of this edge-on spiral galaxy, NGC 4244, is a central massive object.

A central massive object (CMO) is a high mass object or cluster of objects at the centre of a large star system, such as a galaxy or globular cluster. In the case of the former, the CMO may be a supermassive black hole, a nuclear star cluster, or even both together.

The most massive galaxies are thought to always contain a supermassive black hole (SBH); these galaxies do not contain nuclear star clusters, and the CMO is identified with the SBH. Fainter galaxies usually contain a nuclear star cluster (NSC). In most of these galaxies, it is not known whether a supermassive black hole is present, and the CMO is identified with the NSC. A few galaxies, for instance the Milky Way and NGC 4395, are known to contain both a SBH and a NSC. The co-existence of both types of central massive objects was quantified in 2009. Subsequently, a scaling relation between the mass of the supermassive black hole and the mass of the nuclear star cluster was discovered in 2016.

Although this is suggestive that all galaxies have CMOs, and that a common mechanism of galaxy formation causes both, ESA MIRI scientist Torsten Böker observes that some galaxies appear to have neither SBHs nor NSCs.

The mass associated with CMOs is roughly 0.1–0.3% times the total mass of the galactic bulge.

== See also ==
- Core collapse (cluster)
- Galactic Center
- Stellar dynamics
