= Extreme mass ratio inspiral =

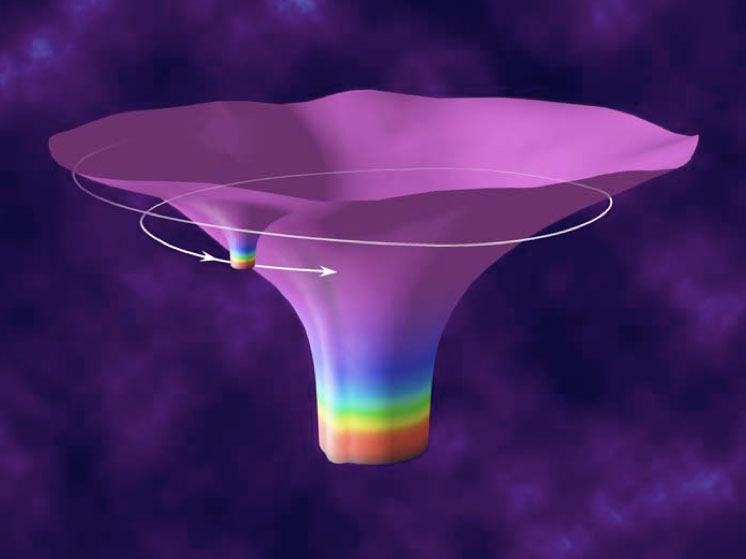
Artist impression of the spacetime generated by an extreme mass ratio inspiral.

In astrophysics, an extreme mass ratio inspiral (EMRI) is the orbit of a relatively light object around a much heavier (by a factor 10,000 or more) object, that gradually spirals in due to the emission of gravitational waves. Such systems are likely to be found in the centers of galaxies, where stellar mass compact objects, such as stellar black holes and neutron stars, may be found orbiting a supermassive black hole. In the case of a black hole in orbit around another black hole this is an extreme mass ratio binary black hole. The term EMRI is sometimes used as a shorthand to denote the emitted gravitational waveform as well as the orbit itself.

The main reason for scientific interest in EMRIs is that they are one of the most promising sources for gravitational wave astronomy using future space-based detectors such as the Laser Interferometer Space Antenna (LISA). If such signals are successfully detected, they will allow accurate measurements of the mass and angular momentum of the central object, which in turn gives crucial input for models for the formation and evolution of supermassive black holes. Moreover, the gravitational wave signal provides a detailed map of the spacetime geometry surrounding the central object, allowing unprecedented tests of the predictions of general relativity in the strong gravity regime.

== Overview ==
=== Scientific potential ===
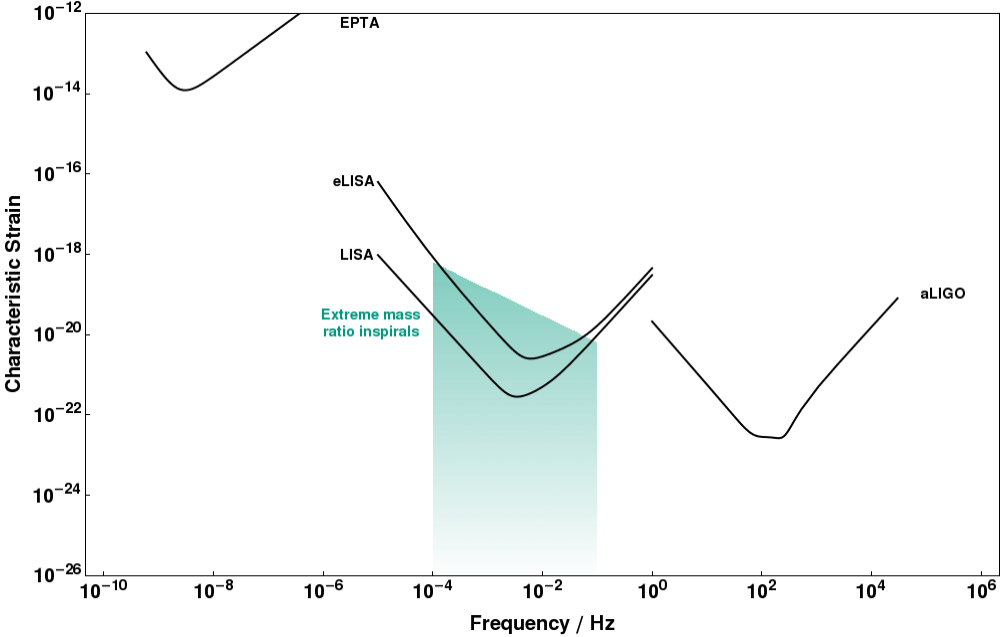
Characteristic strain of EMRI signals as a function of frequency. They lie in the sensitive band for space-borne detectors like LISA or eLISA, but outside the band for ground-based detectors like advanced LIGO (aLIGO) or pulsar timing arrays such as the European Pulsar Timing Array (EPTA).

If successfully detected, the gravitational wave signal from an EMRI will carry a wealth of astrophysical data. EMRIs evolve slowly and complete many (~10,000) cycles before eventually plunging. Therefore, the gravitational wave signal encodes a precise map of the spacetime geometry of the supermassive black hole. Consequently, the signal can be used as an accurate test of the predictions of general relativity in the regime of strong gravity; a regime in which general relativity is completely untested. In particular, it is possible to test the hypothesis that the central object is indeed a supermassive black hole to high accuracy by measuring the quadrupole moment of the gravitational field to an accuracy of a fraction of a percent.

In addition, each observation of an EMRI system will allow an accurate determination of the parameters of the system, including:

- The mass and angular momentum of the central object to an accuracy of 1 in 10,000. By gathering the statistics of the mass and angular momentum of a large number of supermassive black holes, it should be possible to answer questions about their formation. If the angular momentum of the supermassive black holes is large, then they probably acquired most of their mass by swallowing gas from their accretion disc. Moderate values of the angular momentum indicate that the object is most likely formed from the merger of several smaller objects with a similar mass, while low values indicate that the mass has grown by swallowing smaller objects coming in from random directions.
- The mass of the orbiting object to an accuracy of 1 in 10,000. The population of these masses could yield interesting insights in the population of compact objects in the nuclei of galaxies.
- The eccentricity (1 in 10,000) and the (cosine of the) inclination (1 in 100-1000) of the orbit. The statistics for the values concerning the shape and orientation of the orbit contains information about the formation history of these objects. (See the Formation section below.)
- The luminosity distance (5 in 100) and position (with an accuracy of 10^{−3} steradian) of the system. Because the shape of the signal encodes the other parameters of the system, we know how strong the signal was when it was emitted. Consequently, one can infer the distance of the system from the observed strength of the signal (since it diminishes with the distance travelled). Unlike other means of determining distances of the order of several billion light-years, the determination is completely self-contained and does not rely on the cosmic distance ladder. If the system can be matched with an optical counterpart, then this provides a completely independent way of determining the Hubble parameter at cosmic distances.
- Testing the validity of the Kerr conjecture. This hypothesis states that all black holes are rotating black holes of the Kerr or Kerr–Newman types.

== Formation ==
It is currently thought that the centers of most (large) galaxies consist of a supermassive black hole of 10^{6} to 10^{9} solar masses (M_{☉}) surrounded by a dense cluster of 10^{7} to 10^{8} stars maybe 10 light-years across, known as a nuclear star cluster (NSC). The co-existence of these massive black holes and dense nuclear star clusters was quantified in 2009, and a scaling relation between the mass of the supermassive black hole and the mass of the nuclear star cluster was discovered in 2016. This relation is an important astrophysical factor for accurately predicting the event rates of EMRIs. The orbits of the objects around the central supermassive black hole are continually perturbed by two-body interactions with other objects in the NSC, changing the shape of the orbit. Occasionally, an object may pass close enough to the central supermassive black hole for its orbit to produce large amounts of gravitational waves, significantly affecting the orbit. Under specific conditions such an orbit may become an EMRI.

In order to become an EMRI, the back-reaction from the emission of gravitational waves must be the dominant correction to the orbit (compared to, for example, two-body interactions). This requires that the orbiting objects passes very close the central supermassive black hole. A consequence of this is that the inspiralling object cannot be a large heavy star, because it will be ripped apart by the tidal forces.

However, if the object passes too close to the central supermassive black hole, it will make a direct plunge across the event horizon. This will produce a brief violent burst of gravitational radiation which would be hard to detect with currently planned observatories. (Note: LISA will only have a small chance of detecting such signals if it originates from our Milky Way.) Consequently, the creation of EMRI requires a fine balance between objects passing too close and too far from the central supermassive black hole. Currently, the best estimates are that a typical supermassive black hole of 10^{6} M_{☉}, will capture an EMRI once every 10^{6} to 10^{8} years. This makes witnessing such an event in our Milky Way unlikely. However, a space based gravitational wave observatory like LISA will be able to detect EMRI events up to cosmological distances, leading to an expected detection rate somewhere between a few and a few thousand per year.

Extreme mass ratio inspirals created in this way tend to have very large eccentricities (e > 0.9999). The initial, high eccentricity orbits may also be a source of gravitational waves, emitting a short burst as the compact object passes through periapsis. These gravitational wave signals are known as extreme mass ratio bursts. As the orbit shrinks due to the emission of gravitational waves, it becomes more circular. When it has shrunk enough for the gravitational waves to become strong and frequent enough to be continuously detectable by LISA, the eccentricity will typically be around 0.7. Since the distribution of objects in the nucleus is expected to be approximately spherically symmetric, there is expected to be no correlation between the initial plane of the inspiral and the spin of the central supermassive black holes.

In 2011, an impediment to the formation of EMRIs was proposed. The "Schwarzschild Barrier" was thought to be an upper limit to the eccentricity of orbits near a supermassive black hole. Gravitational scattering would drive by torques from the slightly asymmetric distribution of mass in the nucleus ("resonant relaxation"), resulting in a random walk in each star's eccentricity. When its eccentricity would become sufficiently large, the orbit would begin to undergo relativistic precession, and the effectiveness of the torques would be quenched. It was believed that there would be a critical eccentricity, at each value of the semi-major axis, at which stars would be "reflected" back to lower eccentricities. However, it is now clear that this barrier is nothing but an illusion, probably originating from an animation based on numerical simulations, as described in detail in two works.

=== The role of the spin ===
It was realised that the role of the spin of the central supermassive black hole in the formation and evolution of EMRIs is crucial. For a long time it has been believed that any EMRI originating farther away than a certain critical radius of about a hundredth of a parsec would be either scattered away from the capture orbit or directly plunge into the supermassive black hole on an extremely radial orbit. These events would lead to one or a few bursts, but not to a coherent set of thousands of them. Indeed, when taking into account the spin, proved that these capture orbits accumulate thousands of cycles in the detector band. Since they are driven by two-body relaxation, which is chaotic in nature, they are ignorant of anything related to a potential Schwarzchild barrier. Moreover, since they originate in the bulk of the stellar distribution, the rates are larger. Additionally, due to their larger eccentricity, they are louder, which enhances the detection volume. It is therefore expected that EMRIs originate at these distances, and that they dominate the rates.

=== Alternatives ===
Several alternative processes for the production of extreme mass ratio inspirals are known. One possibility would be for the central supermassive black hole to capture a passing object that is not bound to it. However, the window where the object passes close enough to the central black hole to be captured, but far enough to avoid plunging directly into it is extremely small, making it unlikely that such event contribute significantly to the expected event rate.

Another possibility is present if the compact object occurs in a bound binary system with another object. If such a system passes close enough to the central supermassive black hole it is separated by the tidal forces, ejecting one of the objects from the nucleus at a high velocity while the other is captured by the central black hole with a relatively high probability of becoming an EMRI. If more than 1% of the compact objects in the nucleus is found in binaries this process may compete with the "standard" picture described above. EMRIs produced by this process typically have a low eccentricity, becoming very nearly circular by the time they are detectable by LISA.

A third option is that a giant star passes close enough to the central massive black hole for the outer layers to be stripped away by tidal forces, after which the remaining core may become an EMRI. However, it is uncertain if the coupling between the core and outer layers of giant stars is strong enough for stripping to have a significant enough effect on the orbit of the core.

Finally, supermassive black holes are often accompanied by an accretion disc of matter spiraling towards the black hole. If this disc contains enough matter, instabilities can collapse to form new stars. If massive enough, these can collapse to form compact objects, which are automatically on a trajectory to become an EMRI. Extreme mass ratio inspirals created in this way are characterized by the fact their orbital plane is strongly correlated with the plane of the accretion disc and the spin of the supermassive black hole.

=== Intermediate mass ratio inspirals ===
Besides stellar black holes and supermassive black holes, it is speculated that a third class of intermediate mass black holes with masses between 10^{2} and 10^{4} M_{☉} also exists. One way that these may possibly form is through a runway series of collisions of stars in a young cluster of stars. If such a cluster forms within a thousand light years from the galactic nucleus, it will sink towards the center due to dynamical friction. Once close enough the stars are stripped away through tidal forces and the intermediate mass black hole may continue on an inspiral towards the central supermassive black hole. Such a system with a mass ratio around 1000 is known as an intermediate mass ratio inspiral (IMRI). There are many uncertainties in the expected frequency for such events, but some calculations suggest there may be up to several tens of these events detectable by LISA per year. If these events do occur, they will result in an extremely strong gravitational wave signal, that can easily be detected.

Another possible way for an intermediate mass ratio inspiral is for an intermediate mass black hole in a globular cluster to capture a stellar mass compact object through one of the processes described above. Since the central object is much smaller, these systems will produce gravitational waves with a much higher frequency, opening the possibility of detecting them with the next generation of Earth-based observatories, such as Advanced LIGO and Advanced VIRGO. Although the event rates for these systems are extremely uncertain, some calculations suggest that Advanced LIGO may see several of them per year.

== Modelling ==
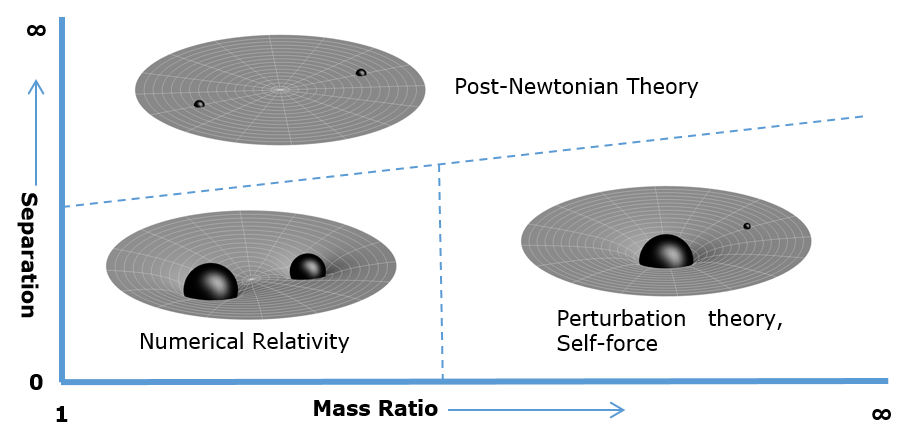
Diagram showing the relationship between various approaches to modelling extreme mass ratio inspirals.

Although the strongest gravitational wave from EMRIs may easily be distinguished from the instrumental noise of the gravitational wave detector, most signals will be deeply buried in the instrumental noise. However, since an EMRI will go through many cycles of gravitational waves (~10^{5}) before making the plunge into the central supermassive black hole, it should still be possible to extract the signal using matched filtering. In this process, the observed signal is compared with a template of the expected signal, amplifying components that are similar to the theoretical template. To be effective this requires accurate theoretical predictions for the wave forms of the gravitational waves produced by an extreme mass ratio inspiral. This, in turn, requires accurate modelling of the trajectory of the EMRI.

The equations of motion in general relativity are notoriously hard to solve analytically. Consequently, one needs to use some sort of approximation scheme. Extreme mass ratio inspirals are well suited for this, as the mass of the compact object is much smaller than that of the central supermassive black hole. This allows it to be ignored or treated perturbatively.

=== Issues with traditional binary modelling approaches ===
==== Post-Newtonian expansion ====
One common approach is to expand the equations of motion for an object in terms of its velocity divided by the speed of light, v/c. This approximation is very effective if the velocity is very small, but becomes rather inaccurate if v/c becomes larger than about 0.3. For binary systems of comparable mass, this limit is not reached until the last few cycles of the orbit. EMRIs, however, spend their last thousand to a million cycles in this regime, making the post-Newtonian expansion an inappropriate tool.

==== Numerical relativity ====
Another approach is to completely solve the equations of motion numerically. The non-linear nature of the theory makes this very challenging, but significant success has been achieved in numerically modelling the final phase of the inspiral of binaries of comparable mass. The large number of cycles of an EMRI make the purely numerical approach prohibitively expensive in terms of computing time.

=== Gravitational self force ===
The large value of the mass ratio in an EMRI opens another avenue for approximation: expansion in one over the mass ratio. To zeroth order, the path of the lighter object will be a geodesic in the Kerr spacetime generated by the supermassive black hole. Corrections due to the finite mass of the lighter object can then be included, order-by-order in the mass ratio, as an effective force on the object. This effective force is known as the gravitational self-force.

In the last decade or so, a lot of progress has been made in calculating the gravitational self force for EMRIs. Numerical codes are available to calculate the gravitational self force on any bound orbit around a non-rotating (Schwarzschild) black hole. And significant progress has been made for calculating the gravitational self force around a rotating black hole.
