= Self-gravitation =

Gravitational force holding a body or system of bodies together

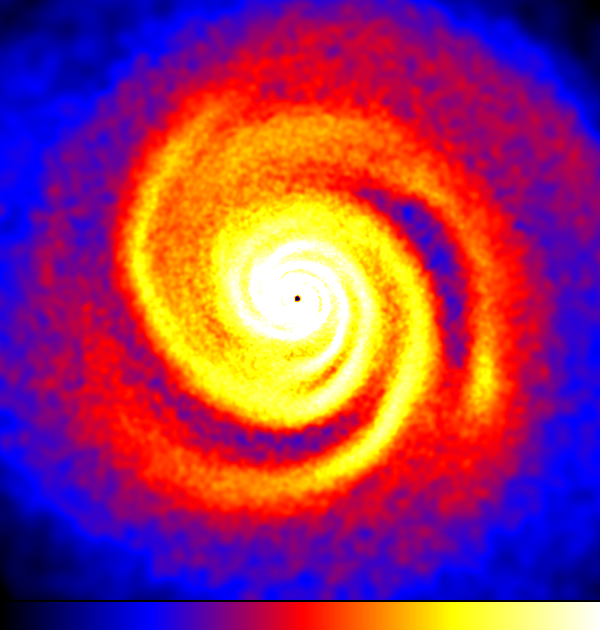
A self-gravitating accretion disc in a quasi steady state

Self-gravity is gravitational force exerted by a system, particularly a celestial body or system of bodies, onto itself. At a sufficient mass, this allows the system to hold itself together. The effects of self-gravity have significance in the fields of astronomy, physics, seismology, geology, and oceanography.

The strength of self-gravity differs with regard to the size of an object, and the distribution of its mass. For example, unique gravitational effects are caused by the oceans on Earth or the rings of Saturn. Donald Lynden-Bell, a British theoretical astrophysicist, constructed the equation for calculating the conditions and effects of self gravitation. The equation's main purpose is to give exact descriptions of models for rotating flattened globular clusters. It is also used in understanding how galaxies and their accretion discs interact with each other. Outside of astronomy, self-gravity is relevant to large-scale observations (on or near the scale of planets) in other scientific fields.

== Astronomy ==
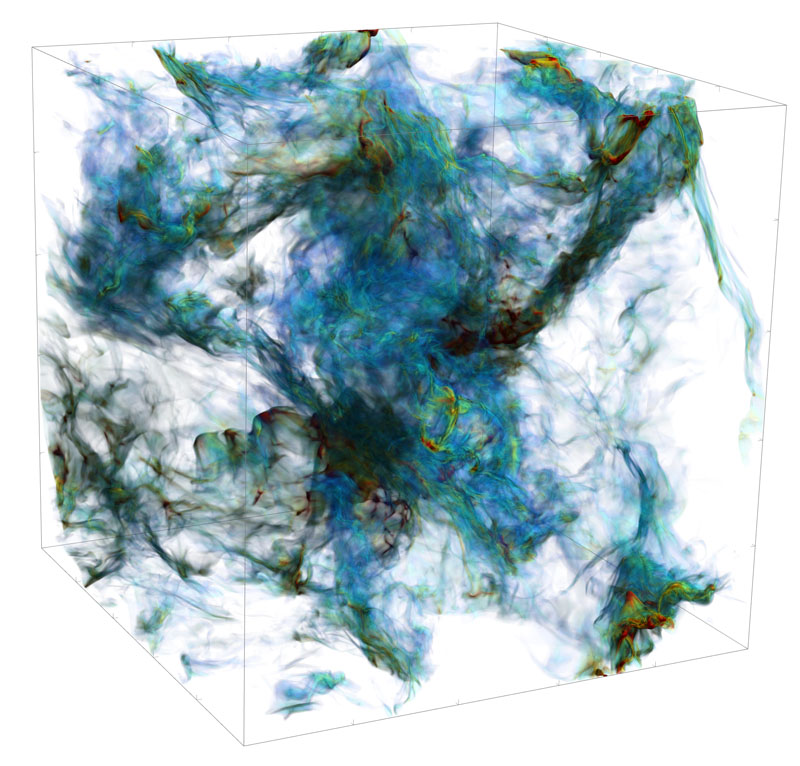
Projected density from a star formation simulation of hypersonic turbulence with self-gravity included. Bright and black dots represent the position of newly formed stars.

Self-gravity must be taken into account by astronomers because the bodies being dealt with are large enough to have gravitational effects on each other and within themselves. Self-gravity affects bodies passing each other in space, within the sphere defined by their Roche limit. In this way, relatively small bodies can be torn apart, though typically the effects of self-gravitation keep the smaller body intact because the smaller body becomes elongated. This has been observed on Saturn because the rings are a function of inter-particle self-gravity. Additionally, in most astronomical circumstances the transit through a Roche limit is temporary, so the force of self-gravitation can restore the body's composition after the fact. Self-gravity is also necessary to understand quasi-stellar object discs, accretion disc formation, and stabilizing these discs around quasi-stellar objects. Self-gravitational forces are also significant in the formation of planetesimals and indirectly the formation of planets, which is critical to understanding how planets and planetary systems form and develop over time. Self-gravity applies to a range of scales, from the formation of rings around individual planets to the formation of planetary systems.

== Seismology ==
Self-gravity has implications in the field of seismology because the Earth is large enough that it can have elastic waves that can change the gravity within the Earth as the waves interact with large-scale subsurface structures. Some models depend on the use of the spectral element method, which take into account the effects of self-gravitation because it can have a large influence on results for certain receiver-source configurations and creates complications in the wave equation, particularly for long period waves. This kind of accuracy is critical in developing accurate 3D crustal models in a spherical body (Earth) in the field of seismology, which allows for more accurate and higher-quality interpretations to be drawn from data. The influence of self-gravity, and gravity, alters the importance of Primary (P) and Secondary (S) waves in seismology because when gravity is taken into account, the effects of the S wave become less significant than they would without.

== Oceanography ==
Self-gravity is influential in understanding the sea level and ice caps for oceanographers and geologists, which is particularly important for anticipating the effects of climate change. The deformation of the Earth from the forces on the oceans can be calculated if the Earth is treated as fluid and the effects of self-gravity are taken into account. This is also used for the influence of ocean tide loading to be taken into account when observing the Earth's deformation response to harmonic surface loading. The results of calculating post-glacial sea levels near the ice caps are significantly different when using a flat Earth model that does not take self-gravity into account, as opposed to a spherical Earth where self-gravity is taken into account because of the sensitivity of the data in these regions, which shows how results can drastically change when self-gravity is ignored. There has also been research done to better understand Laplace's Tidal Equations to try to understand how the deformation of the Earth and self-gravity within the ocean affect the M2 tidal constituent (the tides dictated by the Moon).

== See also ==
- Gravitational energy
- Gravitational self-force
- Gravitational field
- Gravitational collapse
- Kelvin-Helmholtz mechanism
- Chamberlin–Moulton planetesimal hypothesis
- Bound state
