= Nuclear star cluster =

Star cluster in the center of a galaxy

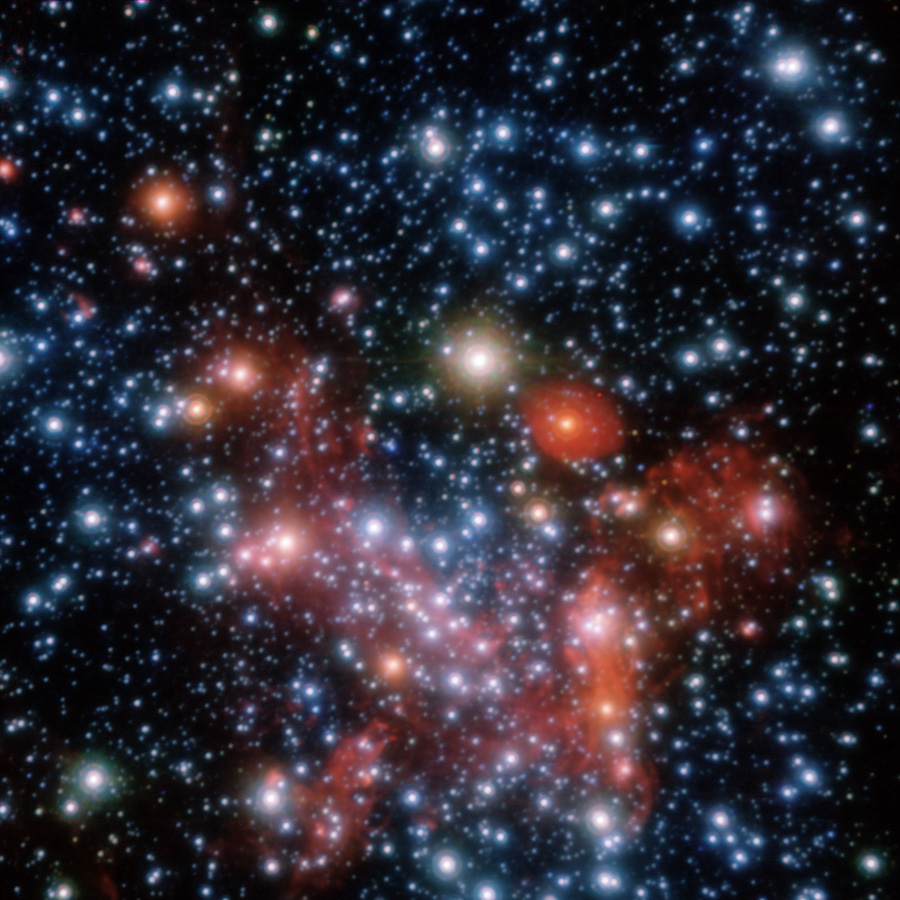
The nuclear star cluster of our own Milky Way Galaxy seen with adaptive optics in the infrared with the NaCo instrument on the VLT.

A nuclear star cluster (NSC) or compact stellar nucleus (sometimes called young stellar nucleus) is a star cluster with high density and high luminosity near the center of mass of many galaxies, including the Milky Way.

NSCs are the central massive objects of fainter, low-mass galaxies where supermassive black holes (SMBHs) often co-exist or are not present. In the most massive galaxies, NSCs are entirely absent. Some galaxies, including the Milky Way, are known to contain both a NSC and a SMBH of comparable mass. The co-existence of massive black holes and dense nuclear star clusters was quantified in 2009. Following this, a scaling relation between the mass of the central supermassive black hole and the mass of the nuclear star cluster was discovered in 2016. This relation is important for understanding the co-evolution of these central massive objects and for predicting rates of extreme mass-ratio inspirals (EMRIs) detectable by future space-based gravitational wave observatories such as LISA.

== Properties ==
Nuclear star clusters are found in most galaxies that can be resolved sufficiently:

- at least 50% of all early spiral galaxies (types Sa-Sc)
- at least 75% of all late spiral galaxies (types Scd-Sm)
- at least 70% of all spheroidal galaxies (types S0 and E).

NSCs are the densest known star clusters in the Universe. With apparent magnitudes between -14 and -10 mag in the infrared, they are on average 40 times brighter than globular clusters, although their effective radii are not larger than 2 to 5 parsecs. With a dynamic mass of 10^{6} to 10^{8} solar masses, they are at the upper end of the values reached by globular clusters.

The majority of nuclear star clusters contain a mix of old (at least one billion years old) and young stellar populations and show signs of star formation within the last 100 million years.

== Formation ==
Although the mechanisms behind their formation are not entirely known, hypotheses provide four possibilities:

- Nuclear star clusters originate somewhere else and are captured by a central black hole.
- Nuclear star clusters are due to an incidence of gas at some distance from the center of the galaxy.
- A combination of the above possibilities whereby the gravitational potential of a trapped object, such as the nucleus of a dwarf galaxy, triggers new star formation by incident gas near the galactic center.
- Nuclear star clusters are created by merging star clusters with subsequent migration to the galactic center due to dynamical friction with background stars.

== Relationship with globular clusters ==
Because nuclear star clusters occur in most galaxy species, they should still be present in the halo of the resulting galaxy after the fusion of galaxies. This is a hypothesis for the formation of globular clusters. Thus, globular clusters could be the remains of nuclear star clusters excluded from gas incidence, in which no new star formation occurs.

According to other hypotheses, however, the nuclear star clusters could be the result of a fusion of globular clusters captured by a supermassive black hole in the center of the galaxy and dynamically destroyed.
