= SDSS J1106+1939 =

Supermassive black hole

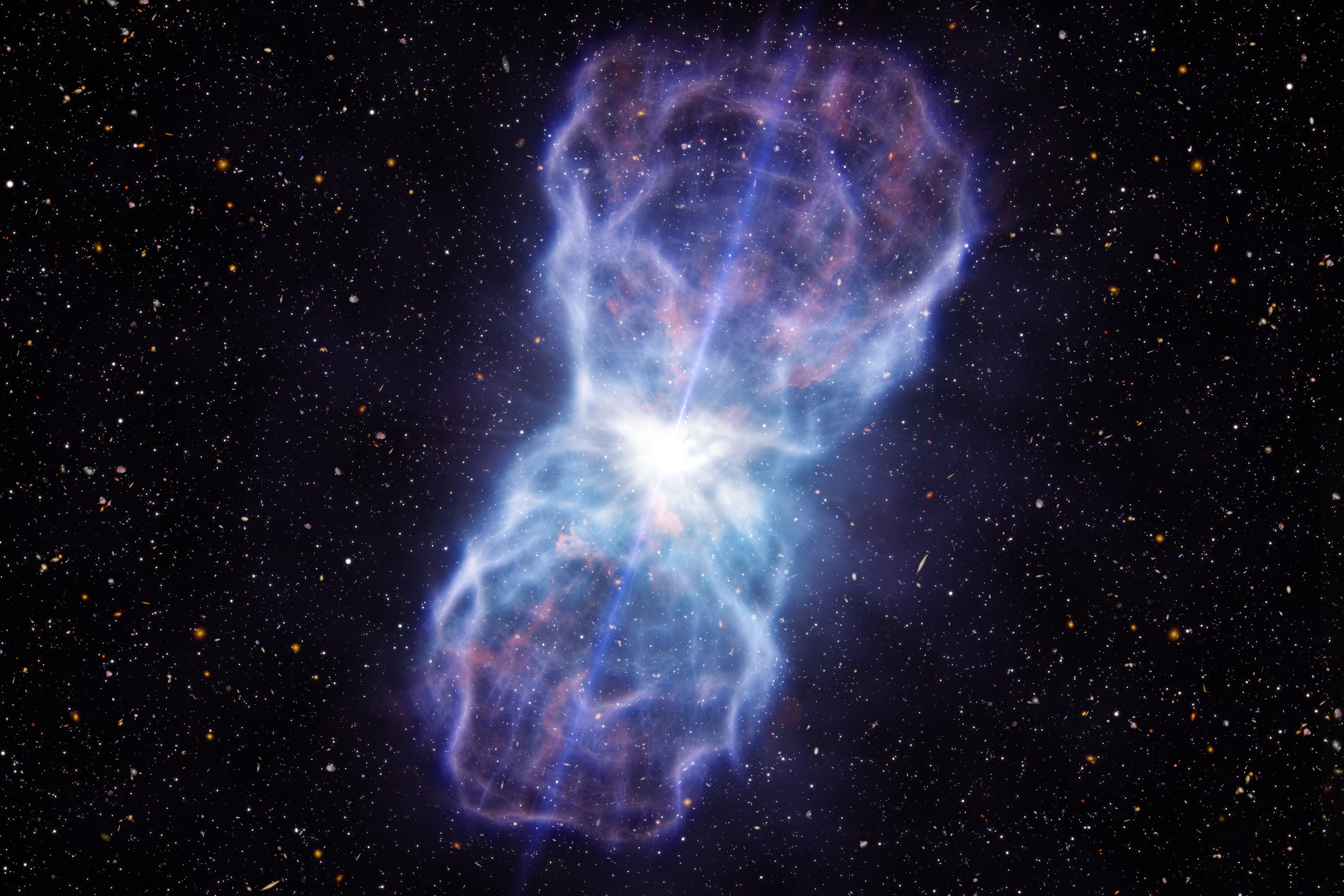
- An artist's impression of the huge matter outflow out of SDSS J1106+1939's nucleus.

Observation data (Epoch J2000)
- Constellation: Leo
- Right ascension: 11^{h} 06^{m} 44.9^{s}
- Declination: +19° 39′ 30″
- Redshift: 3.0499
- Distance: 11.57 billion light years (3.54 billion parsecs
- Apparent magnitude (V): 19.47
- Notable features: Huge matter outflow

Other designations
- Gaia DR2 3984387662386742400

SDSS J1106+1939 (SDSS J110644.95+193930.6) is a quasar, notable for its energetic matter outflow. It is the record holder for the most powerful matter outflow by a quasar. The engine is a supermassive black hole, pulling in matter at the rate of 400 solar masses per year and ejecting it at the speed of 8000 km/s. The outflow produces a luminosity of 10^{46} ergs. This makes the quasar more than two trillion times brighter than the Sun, one of the most luminous quasars on record. The quasar has the visual magnitude of about ~19, despite its extreme distance of 11 billion light years. The outflow of matter from the quasar produces about 1/20 of its luminosity.
