= 3C 186 =

Quasar in the constellation Lynx

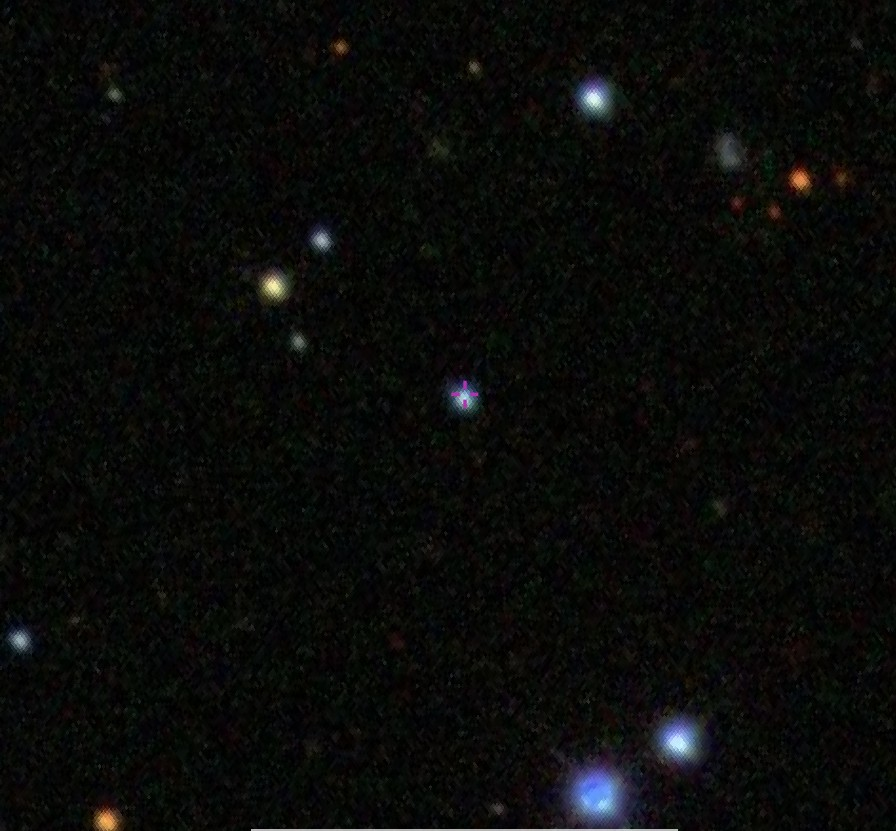
- The quasar 3C 186

Observation data (J2000.0 epoch)
- Constellation: Lynx
- Right ascension: 07^{h} 44^{m} 17.486^{s}
- Declination: +37° 53′ 17.36″
- Redshift: 1.065505
- Heliocentric radial velocity: 319,430 km/s
- Distance: 8 Gly
- Apparent magnitude (V): 18.14
- Apparent magnitude (B): 17.5

Characteristics
- Type: CSS
- Notable features: Displaced supermassive black hole

Other designations
- 4C 38.21, LHE 208, LEDA 2817581, NRAO 273, OHIO I 368, QSO J0744+3753, QSO B0740+38, NVSS J074417+375316

3C 186 is a radio-loud quasar in the constellation of Lynx. Discovered in 1972, the object has a redshift of (z) 1.069 and is classified as a Compact Steep Spectrum (CSS) source whose age is estimated to be about 100,000 years. It is associated with an X-ray cluster and is considered a recoiling supermassive black hole candidate. Its luminosity is estimated to be 10^{47} erg/s.

== Description ==
The host of 3C 186 is classified as an elliptical galaxy with a region of diffused emission being located both southwest and northeast. It has a star formation rate estimated to be 65 ± 20 M_{☉} per year with a relatively mature stellar population aged around 200 million years. In addition, the host shows a distorted appearance with tidal features, indicating a late stage galaxy merger. Observations also found the host galaxy has a molecular gas reservoir with a mass of 80 billion M_{☉} probably accreted from the merger.

The radio structure of 3C 186 can be described as an S-shaped source. Based on MERLIN radio mapping images, the source is made up of a knotty jet and two radio lobes on opposite sides which the jet is targeted at. There is a southernmost component showing a 90° bend angle suggesting there is a continuation of the jet. Radio images made by very long baseline interferometry at 50 centimeters showed the source has southeast and northwest components, interpreted as the brighter structures of the lobes. The central radio core of the object is self-absorbed. When shown in optical-ultraviolet wavelengths, its spectrum is found to be mainly dominated by a blue bump component with emission lines. The source has an approximate angular size of 2".

=== Black hole ===
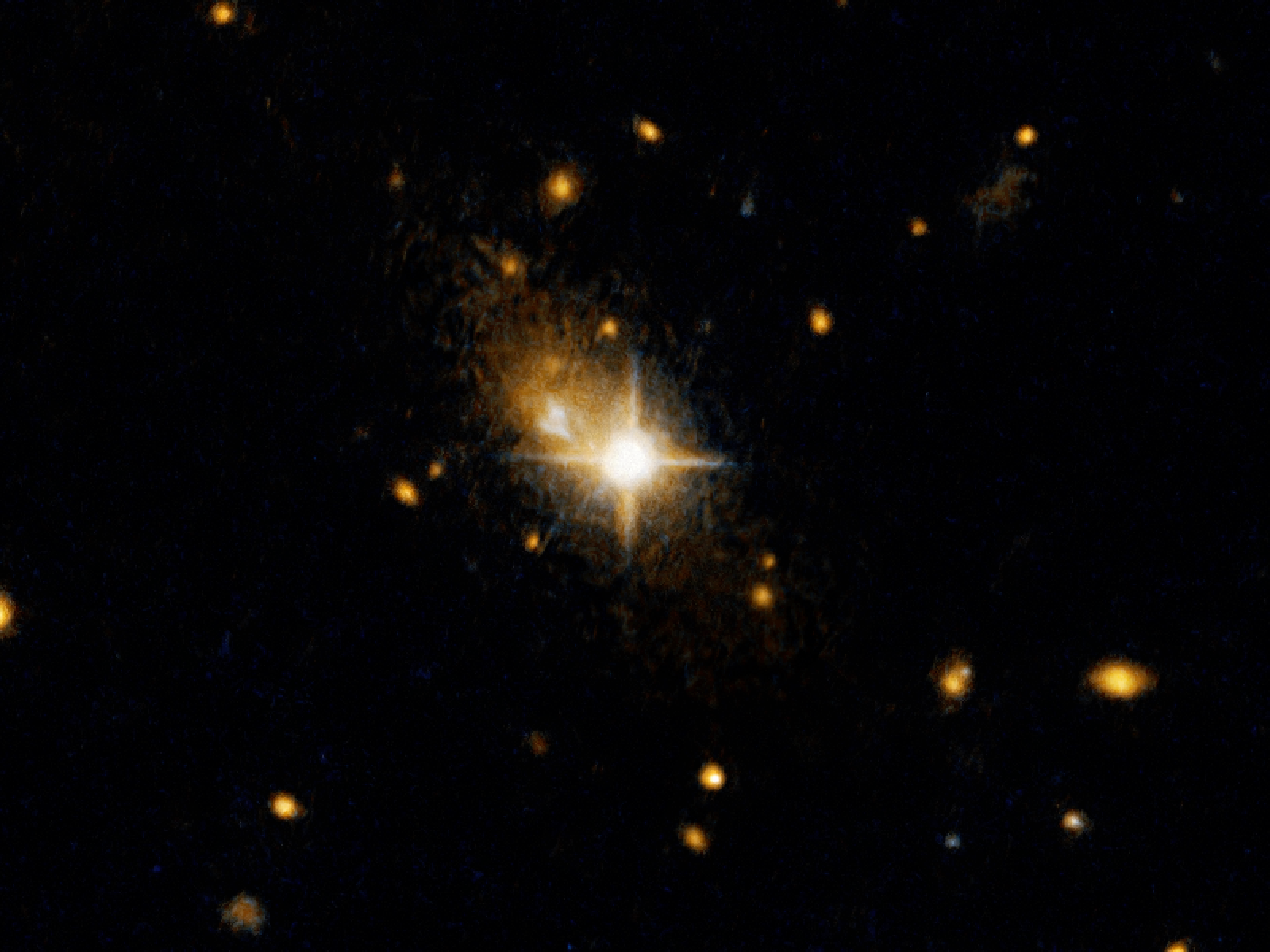
Hubble Space Telescope image of 3C 186

3C 186 has a supermassive black hole with an estimated mass of 3 billion M_{☉} and an Eddington luminosity rate of 4×10^{47} erg s^{−1}. However unlike other active galactic nuclei whose black holes are found in the center, the black hole is found displaced by 11.1 ± 0.1 kiloparsecs away from the host galaxy. When looking at the velocity shift between its narrow and broad emission lines, the result shows a value of −2140 ± 390 km/s, suggesting the AGN is moving at a slower speed compared to the host galaxy.

The most likely hypothesis for the displacement of the black hole is the merger of two black holes from two colliding galaxies about 1–2 billion years ago. When the black holes coalesced, the creation of strong gravitational waves caused by the merger generated a kick, resulting the newly formed black hole to be flung out from the center of the galaxy.

== X-ray cluster ==
3C 186 is found to be located in the center of a cool-core galaxy cluster. Based on observations, the cluster is X-ray luminous showing a slight temperature of 7.8+2.4
−1.9 keV in the outer regions and a decreased temperature of 3.11+0.91
−0.64 keV in its central region. Apart from that, the cluster also has a cooling core with an elongated morphology.
