= CAPERS-LRD-z9 =

High-redshift galaxy in the constellation Sextans

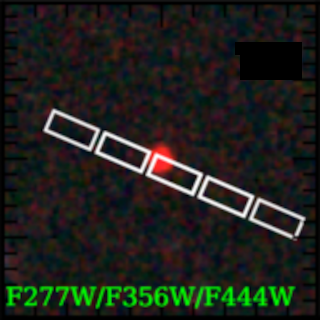
- Image of CAPERS-LRD-z9 taken by the James Webb Space Telescope.

Observation data
- Constellation: Sextans
- Right ascension: 10^{h} 00^{m} 32.7^{s}
- Declination: +02° 18′ 28.91″
- Redshift: 9.288±0.003

Characteristics
- Type: Little red dot

Other designations
- CAPERS-COSMOS-119334

CAPERS-LRD-z9 is a galaxy that is among the oldest ever observed, having formed 13.3 billion years ago, just 500 million years after the Big Bang. For a little red dot (LRD), this is nearly typical age. The supermassive black hole at the center of the galaxy could be as heavy as 300 million solar masses, equivalent to half the stars in its galaxy.

== See also ==
- List of the most distant astronomical objects
