= Gravitational self-force =

Gravitational self-force formalism

In gravitational wave physics, the gravitational self-force formalism is an approach to solving the relativistic two body problem using a systematic expansion of the dynamics is powers of the ratio of the masses of the two components of the binary. The gravitational self-force formalism is generally perceived as the only viable route towards predicting accurate gravitational waveform templates for observing extreme mass-ratio inspirals with the Laser Interferometer Space Antenna.

== Formulation ==
The gravitational self-force formalism addresses the regime of the relativistic two body problem where one body (called the primary) is much more massive than the other body (the secondary). It aims to solve the dynamics as a systematic expansion in powers of the mass-ratio $q = m_2/m_1$. In typical situations both bodies are assumed to be black holes, but this assumption is not strictly necessary and most results hold for general bodies, as long as the secondary is compact, meaning that the length scales associated with the secondary are proportional to $Gm_2/c^2$. The gravitational self-force formalism exploits these systems will exhibit a hierarchy of length scales with the typical length scale of the secondary much smaller than the curvature length scale associated with the primary. As a consequence the metric "far" away from the secondary can be described as a perturbation of the metric that would have been produced by the primary alone

$$g_{\mu\nu}^{\rm far} = g_{\mu\nu}^{\rm primary} + q h_{\mu\nu}^{(1)} + q^2 h_{\mu\nu}^{(2)} + \mathcal{O}(q^3).$$

At the same time, the equivalence principle implies that if we zoom in on the secondary that in some sufficiently small neighborhood "near" the secondary the metric is described as

$$g_{\mu\nu}^{\rm near} = g_{\mu\nu}^{\rm secondary} + q H_{\mu\nu}^{(1)} + q^2 H_{\mu\nu}^{(2)} + \mathcal{O}(q^3).$$

Taking general solutions in each regime and matching both in some intermediate regime using the method of matched asymptotic expansions leads to an effective description of the binary in terms of an effective spacetime

$$g_{\mu\nu}^{\rm eff} = g_{\mu\nu}^{\rm primary} + q h_{\mu\nu}^{R1} + q^2 h_{\mu\nu}^{R2} + \mathcal{O}(q^3),$$

and the motion of the secondary being represented as a worldline in this spacetime. If the secondary is spherically metric (e.g. a Schwarzschild black hole) then its worldline will be a geodesic in the effective spacetime. Our equivalently, expressed relative to the background spacetime $g_{\mu\nu}^{\rm primary}$ the 4-velocity of worldline $u^\mu$satisfies

$$u^\nu \nabla_\nu u^\mu = 0 + q F^\mu_{(1)}[ h_{\mu\nu}^{R1}] + q^2 F^\mu_{(2)}[ h_{\mu\nu}^{R1},h_{\mu\nu}^{R2}] + \mathcal{O}(q^3),$$

where the left-hand side is simply the geodesic equation in the background spacetime, and the right-hand side representing an effective force term correcting the motion, the gravitational self-force. Specifically, $F^\mu_{(1)}$ is known as the first-order gravitational self-force and $F^\mu_{(2)}$ as the second-order gravitational self-force.

=== General secondary ===
If the secondary is not spherical, then the compactness of the secondary implies that the above result gets modified by the multipole moments of the gravitational field of the secondary, with higher order multipole moments showing up at higher order in the mass-ratio. At zeroth order in the mass-ratio, the worldline in still given by a geodesic in the background spacetime. At linear order, the motion gets corrected by a force term coming from the current-dipole moment (a.k.a. the spin) of the secondary coupling to the background curvature, the (linear) Mathisson–Papapetrou–Dixon force, while the first order effective metric perturbation $h_{\mu\nu}^{R1}$ depends only on the monopole moment (a.k.a. the mass) of the secondary. At second order we get the quadractic Mathisson–Papapetrou–Dixon force in the first-order effective metric, a coupling of the secondary quadrupole moment to the background curvature, and the second order effective metric perturbation $h_{\mu\nu}^{R2}$ picks up a contribution sourced by the secondary spin. And so forth at higher orders.

== The Capra meetings on Radiation Reaction in General Relativity ==
The "Capra Meeting on Radiation Reaction in General Relativity" is the annual meeting of the international community of scientists working on gravitational self-force (colloquially known as the Capra community). The first Capra meeting was organized in 1998 by the Patrick Brady to discuss "Radiation Reaction in General Relativity", including the then recent papers on gravitational self-force by Mino, Sasaki, and Tanaka and Quinn and Wald. The meeting was held at the Capra ranch, left to Caltech by the movie director Frank Capra. Follow-up meetings have been held annually since then in various locations, and while never returning to the Capra ranch have kept the name referring to the original location. The first Capra meeting was attended by only 10 people including Eric Poisson and Kip Thorne. The most recent editions of the Capra meeting have attracted over 100 participants.
