= Markarian 177 =

Blue Compact dwarf galaxy in the constellation Ursa Major

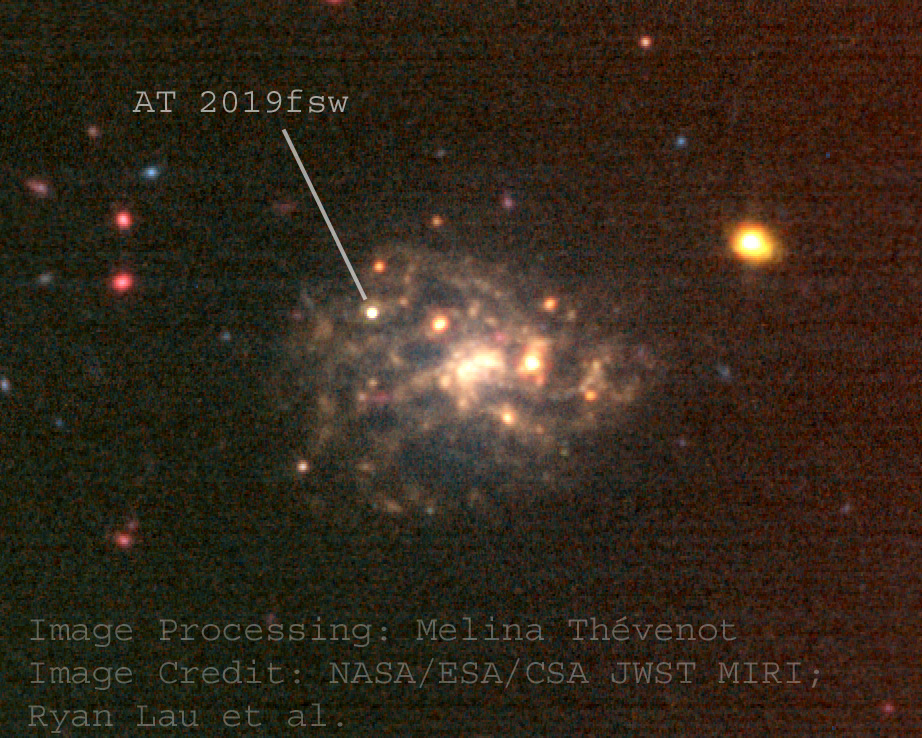
- James Webb Space Telescope MIRI image with the LBV marked

Observation data (J2000.0 epoch)
- Constellation: Ursa Major
- Right ascension: 11^{h} 33^{m} 23.474^{s}
- Declination: +55° 04′ 20.10″
- Redshift: 0.008088
- Distance: 90,000,000 ly (28 Mpc) h^{−1}_{0.678}
- Apparent magnitude (V): 15.7
- Notable features: SDSS J113323.97+550415.8 — Ejected supermassive black hole

Other designations
- Markarian 177, MKR 177, MKN 177, MRK 177, Mark 177, 2MASX J11332348+5504204, SDSS J113323.47+550420.6, PGC 35678, LEDA 35678, UGCA 239

Markarian 177 is a blue compact dwarf galaxy located 90,000,000 ly (28 Mpc) away, at the constellation of Ursa Major, in the bowl of the Big Dipper asterism. It was discovered by the astronomer Benjamin Markarian.

Markarian 177 is a peculiar galaxy that is receding from us at a rate of 2425 km/s. It has a visual apparent size of 0.41×0.34 arcmin.

== SDSS1133 ==
Near the galaxy, at over 2,600 ly (800 pc) from it, is a luminous X-ray source named SDSS J113323.97+550415.8 (SDSS1133), in orbit around Markarian 177. The source has been stable for some decades from the 1950s through the 2000s, and the emission region is some 40 ly (12 pc) wide. It may be an ejected supermassive black hole from a galaxy that interacted with Markarian 177.

Alternative explanations for the X-ray source include it possibly being a luminous blue variable star that has recently undergone a supernova in the early 2000s, where for the previous five decades it had been in continuous eruption.
