= 1963 in science =

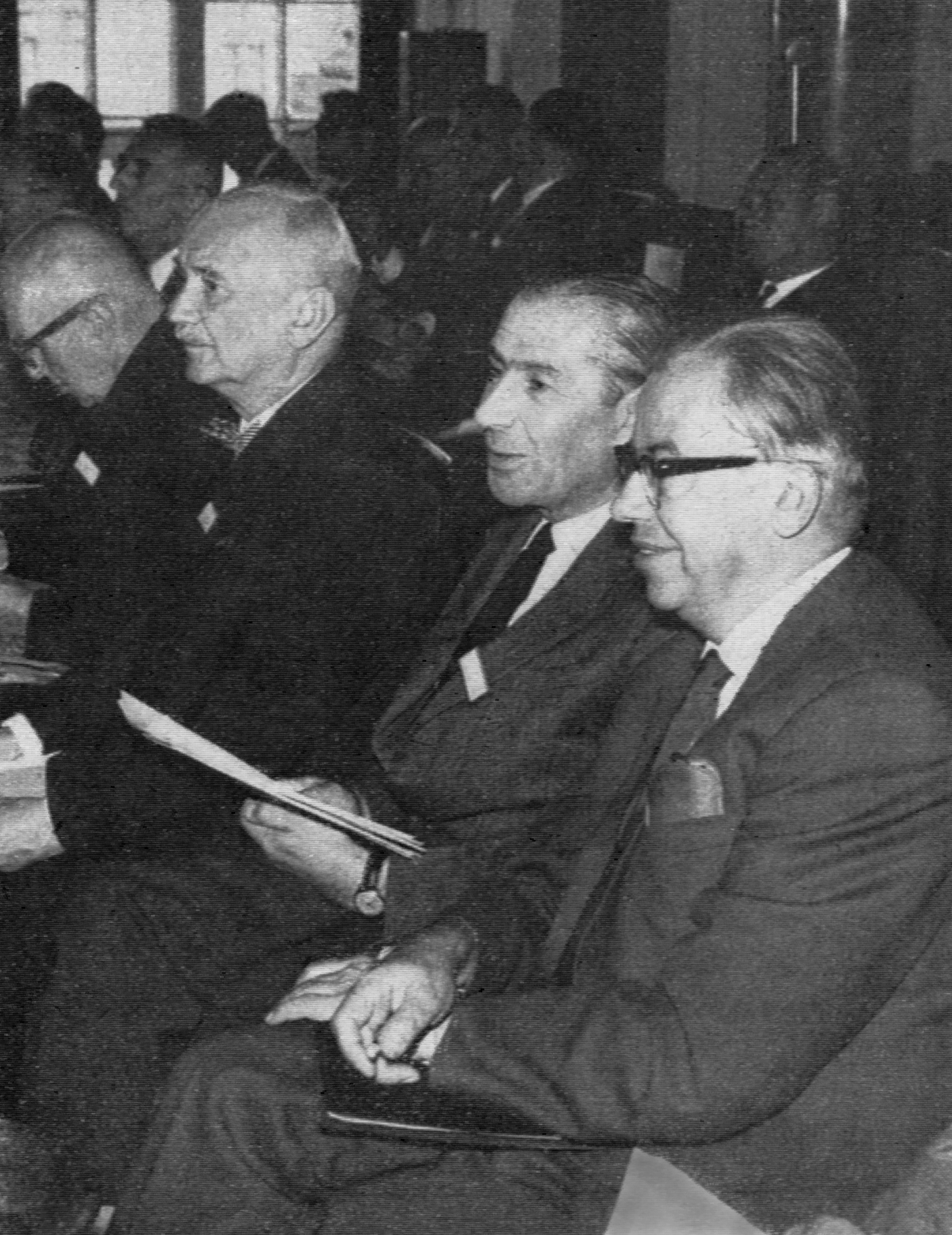
11th IUPAP General Conference Warsaw 18-23 September 1963 From right to left: prof. Sosnowski, prof. Natanson, prof. Rubinowicz

The year 1963 in science and technology involved some significant events, listed below.

== Astronomy, astrophysics and space exploration ==
- January 1 – Long-period comet C/1963 A1 (Ikeya) is discovered by a Japanese amateur.
- January 4 – Soviet Luna reaches Earth orbit but fails to reach the Moon.
- May 15 – Mercury program: NASA launches the last mission of the program Mercury 9. (On June 12 NASA Administrator James E. Webb tells Congress the program is complete.)
- July 26 – Roy Kerr submits for publication his discovery of the Kerr metric, an exact solution to the Einstein field equation of general relativity, predicting a rotating black hole.
- October 18 – Aboard the French Véronique AGI 47 sounding rocket, a bicolor cat designated C 341, later known as Félicette, becomes the first cat in space.
- November 1 – The Arecibo Observatory, with the world's largest single-dish radio telescope, officially opens in Arecibo, Puerto Rico.
- First definite identification of a radio source, 3C 48, with an optical object, later identified as a quasar, is published by Allan Sandage and Thomas A. Matthews; also Maarten Schmidt publishes significant observations on 3C 273.

== Biology ==
- Geneticist J. B. S. Haldane coins the word "clone".
- Molecular biologist Emile Zuckerkandl and physical chemist Linus Pauling introduce the term paleogenetics.
- Konrad Lorenz publishes On Aggression (Das sogenannte Böse: Zur Naturgeschichte der Aggression).
- Niko Tinbergen poses his four questions to be asked of any animal behavior.
- Sydney Brenner proposes the use of Caenorhabditis elegans as a model organism for the investigation primarily of neural development in animals.

== Cartography ==
- Robinson projection devised by Arthur H. Robinson.

== Computing ==
- Ivan Sutherland writes the revolutionary Sketchpad program and runs it on the Lincoln TX-2 computer at Massachusetts Institute of Technology.

== Earth sciences ==
- September 7 – British geophysicists Fred Vine and Drummond Matthews publish proof of seafloor spreading on the Atlantic Ocean floor.
- November 14 – The Icelandic volcanic island of Surtsey appears above sea level.

== History of science and technology ==
- April 1 – Industrial Monuments Survey for the Ministry of Public Building and Works (Great Britain) commenced by Rex Wailes.
- Kenneth Hudson's Industrial Archaeology: an introduction published in London.
- Derek J. de Solla Price's Little Science, Big Science published in New York.

== Mathematics ==
- Paul Cohen uses forcing to prove that the continuum hypothesis and the axiom of choice are independent from Zermelo–Fraenkel set theory.
- Walter Feit and John G. Thompson state the Feit–Thompson theorem.
- Edward Lorenz publishes his discovery of the 'butterfly effect', significant in the development of chaos theory.
- Atiyah–Singer index theorem announced by Michael Atiyah and Isadore Singer.
- Stanisław Ulam devises the Ulam spiral as a graphical depiction of the set of prime numbers.

== Medicine ==
- June – Guy Alexandre performs the first kidney transplantation from a heart-beating, brain-dead donor, at Saint Pierre Hospital, Leuven, Belgium.
- Thomas Starzl performs the first liver transplantation, at the University of Colorado Health Sciences Center.
- James D. Hardy performs the first lung transplantation.
- Measles vaccines are introduced commercially.
- American endocrinologist Grant Liddle identifies Liddle's syndrome.
- French pediatrician Jérôme Lejeune first describes cri du chat syndrome.
- Pentasomy X is first diagnosed.

== Paleontology ==
- The type species of the early dinosaur Herrerasaurus, Herrerasaurus ischigualastensis from the north of Argentina, is described by Osvaldo Reig.

== Physics ==
- David H. Frisch and J. H. Smith prove radioactive decay of mesons is slowed by their motion. (See Einstein's special relativity and general relativity.)

== Psychology ==
- Stanley Milgram publishes the results of his shock experiment on obedience to authority figures.
- The term "contrafreeloading" was coined.

== Technology ==
- Lava lamp invented by Edward Craven Walker.
- Mellotron Mark I electromechanical polyphonic tape replay keyboard, developed and built in Aston, Birmingham, England, is marketed.
- Don Buchla begins to design an electronic music synthesizer in Berkeley, California.

== Events ==
- November 23 – First episode of science fiction television series Doctor Who broadcast by the BBC in the United Kingdom.

== Awards ==
- Nobel Prizes
  - Physics – Eugene Paul Wigner, Maria Goeppert-Mayer, J. Hans D. Jensen
  - Chemistry – Karl Ziegler, Giulio Natta
  - Medicine – Sir John Carew Eccles, Alan Lloyd Hodgkin, Andrew Fielding Huxley

== Births ==
- January 4 – May-Britt Moser, Norwegian neuroscientist, winner of the Nobel Prize in Physiology or Medicine.
- February 9 – Brian Greene, American theoretical physicist.
- February 10 – Vivian Wing-Wah Yam, Hong Kong chemist working on OLEDs
- March – Jin Li, Chinese geneticist.
- August 14 – Saiful Islam, Pakistani-born materials chemist.
- August 30 – Magdalena Zernicka-Goetz, Polish-born developmental biologist.
- W. Tecumseh Fitch, American-born evolutionary biologist.
- Daniel Jackson, English-born American computer scientist.

== Deaths ==
- January 28 – Jean Piccard (born 1884), Swiss-born American chemist and explorer.
- February 5 – Barnum Brown (born 1873), American paleontologist.
- April 6 – Otto Struve (born 1897), Russian astronomer.
- May 11 – Herbert Spencer Gasser (born 1888), American physiologist, winner of the Nobel Prize in Physiology or Medicine.
- May 19 – Walter Russell (born 1871), American polymath.
- June 16 – Eleanor Williams (born 1884), Australian bacteriologist and serologist.
- August 30 – Marietta Pallis (born 1882), British ecologist.
- October 13 – Alan A. Griffith (born 1893), English stress engineer.
- October 2 – Olga Lepeshinskaya (born 1871), Soviet Lysenkoist biologist.
- October 25 – Karl von Terzaghi (born 1883), Austrian "father of soil mechanics".
- November 13 – Margaret Murray (born 1863), Indian-English anthropologist and author.
