= 3C 147 =

Quasar in the constellation Auriga

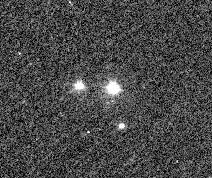
- Hubble Legacy Archive WFPC2 image of 3C 147

Observation data (Epoch J2000)
- Constellation: Auriga
- Right ascension: 05^{h} 42^{m} 36.138^{s}
- Declination: +49° 51′ 07.23″
- Redshift: 0.545
- Distance: 5.1 billion light-years (Light travel time); 6.4 billion light-years (present)
- Type: Quasar; Core-Dominated; Seyfert 1
- Apparent magnitude (V): 17.8

Other designations
- PGC 2355407, 2E 1506, 2MASS J05423614+4951071, QSO B0538+498

3C 147 (B0538+498) is a compact steep-spectrum (CSS) quasar that was discovered in 1964. It is located in the constellation Auriga not far in the sky from the 5th magnitude star Omicron Aurigae.

The "distance" of a far away galaxy depends on the distance measurement used. With a redshift of 0.545, light from this active galaxy is estimated to have taken around 5.1 billion years to reach Earth. But as a result of the expansion of the Universe, the present (co-moving) distance to this galaxy is about 6.4 billion light-years (1974 Mpc).

Very Long Baseline Array (VLBA) observations have identified a complex central region that is dominated by two bright components, A and B. The separation between the two central components of the source seems to be increasing with an apparent velocity (superluminal motion) of 1.2 ± 0.4 c.

3C 147 is one of four primary calibrators used by the Very Large Array (along with 3C 48, 3C 138, and 3C 286). Visibilities of all other sources are calibrated using observed visibilities of one of these four calibrators.

== See also ==
- List of quasars – List of galactic nuclei
