= QSO B1422+202 =

Quasar in the constellation Boötes

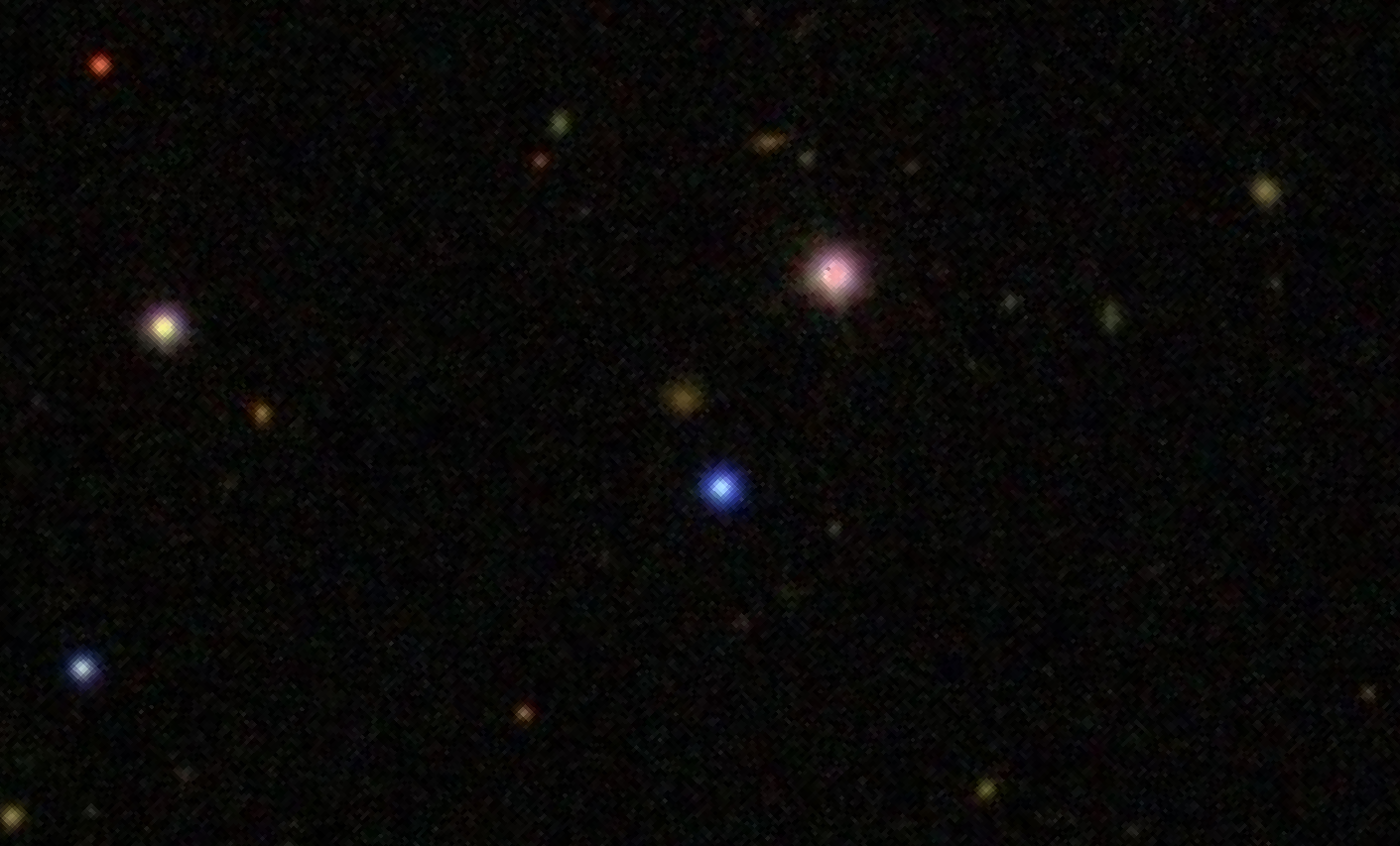
- SDSS image of QSO B1422+202.

Observation data (J2000.0 epoch)
- Constellation: Boötes
- Right ascension: 14^{h} 24^{m} 56.88^{s}
- Declination: +20° 00′ 22.63″
- Redshift: 0.871000
- Heliocentric radial velocity: 261,119 km/s
- Distance: 7.370 Gly
- Apparent magnitude (V): 17.65
- Apparent magnitude (B): 18.09

Characteristics
- Type: AGN

Other designations
- 4C 20.33, PKS 1422+20, LEDA 2819642, 7C 1422+2013, RX J1424.9+2000, NVSS J142456+200022, OQ +235, DA 367, CoNFIG 193, Cul 1422+202

QSO B1422+202 is a quasar located in the constellation of Boötes. The redshift of the object is (z) 0.871. It was first discovered by astronomers in 1966 through spectroscopic observations and is designated as 4C 20.33 in the Fourth Cambridge Survey.

== Description ==
QSO B1422+202 has a compact steep spectrum source (CSS). When viewed with Very Large Array (VLA) polarimetry imaging, it has a radio core with low polarization and with a lengthy one-sided jet to the south, displaying a large amount of polarized radio emission in its jet components, estimated between 30% and 60%. The jet also shown to be curved as well despite VLA describing it as straight. The structure appears to be bent at its southern end.

A radio lobe on the counter-jet side is present in the structure, described as less polarized too with diffused emission located near its nucleus. VLA radio mapping also described the structure of the source as elongated with a faint off-axis region. Additionally, a compact component marked as the beginning of the jet, was found to display an inverted spectral index. Observations made by Very Long Baseline Interferometry (VLBI) at 92 centimeters described the source as diffused instead with emission being concentrated in a 400 milliarcseconds area.

More detailed radio imaging made by both VLA and VLBI shows the quasar displaying radio emission blobs in its elongated structure in a north to south direction. There is the same lengthy jet from the previous observations present, pointing towards the direction of south but there is possibly helical shaped based on the components placed along the major axis position angle. Two hotspot features, mainly a weak hotspot and a bright hotspot located in the jet end on opposite side of another component were discovered. The core contains a gigahertz peaked radio spectrum with emission peaking at 4 GHz.

The quasar is surrounded by extended ionized emission-line gas according to observations made by William Herschel Telescope (WHT) using a faint object spectrograph. When observed, the gas density is estimated to be 55 cm^{−3} with a separation gap of 24 kiloparsecs. The oxygen line ratios are similar to the quasar 3C 48 at a low redshift, suggesting it has a high amount of gas density.
