= 3C 138 =

Quasar in the constellation Taurus

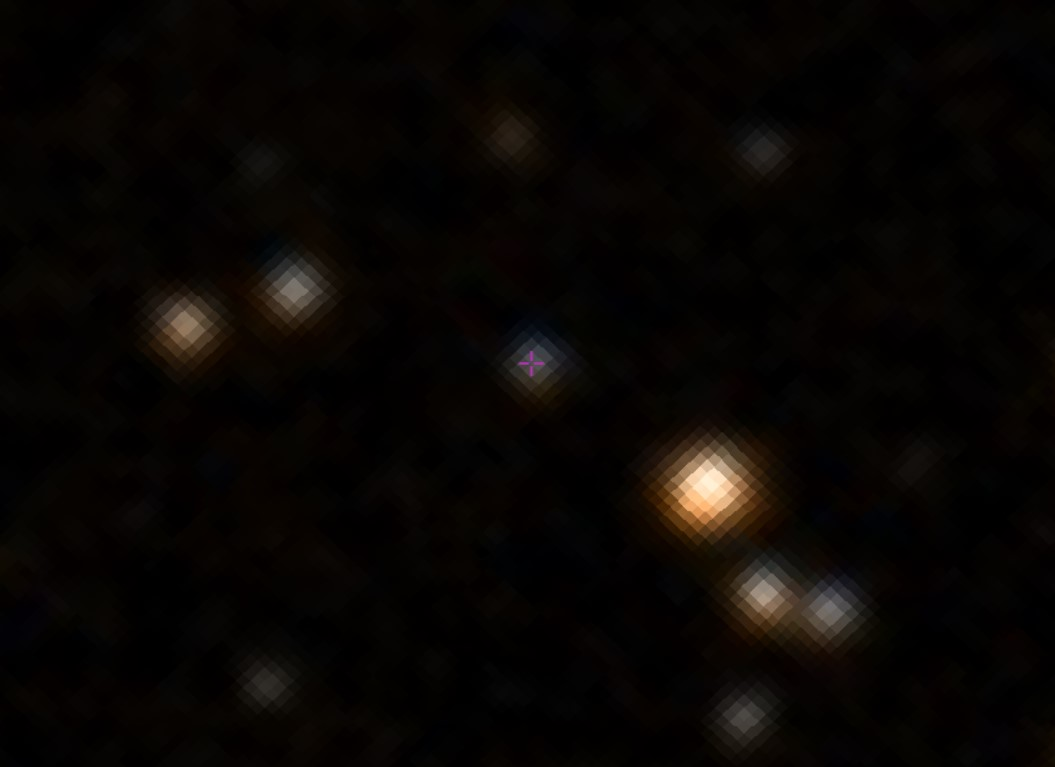
- The quasar 3C 138.

Observation data (J2000.0 epoch)
- Constellation: Taurus
- Right ascension: 05^{h} 21^{m} 09.886^{s}
- Declination: +16° 38′ 22.052″
- Redshift: 0.759000
- Heliocentric radial velocity: 227,543 km/s
- Distance: 6.739 Gly
- Apparent magnitude (V): 18.84
- Apparent magnitude (B): 19.37

Characteristics
- Type: Opt. var, Sy 1.5

Other designations
- 4C +16.12, PKS B0518+565, LEDA 2817552, DA 170, Cul 0518+565, NRAO 205

3C 138 is a quasar located in the constellation of Taurus. It has a redshift of (z) 0.76. The radio spectrum of this source appears both compact and steep, making it a compact steep-spectrum radio quasar. It is also one of the few 3C objects showing a defined and turn-over in its electromagnetic spectrum at low frequencies.

3C 138 is known to show linear polarization at high degrees although the source of it remains a mystery. When correcting the Faraday rotation for this object, the electric field position angle is ~170°, indicating the magnetic field direction as ~ 80°. The source of 3C 138 is shown to emit gamma rays with a powerful flare detected in 2012.

The radio structure of 3C 138 is unresolved at both 0.151 and 0.408 GHz. However, when detected through higher frequencies, it is revealed to be largely linear. The structure is then further divided into separate components consisting of a bright radio core and a radio jet which is polarized and showing a slight increase from 12 percent at 5 GHz to 14 percent at 15 GHz. There are several extended knots present within the main jet emission region extending 400 milliarcseconds in a 65° position angle. A low surface-brightness counter-jet is located in an opposite direction from the region. Furthermore, 3C 138 has a compact radio lobe located east and a much fainter, diffused radio lobe located west.

3C 138 is one of the four primary calibrators used by the Very Large Array. The other three are 3C 48, 3C 147 and 3C 286. For all visibilities of other sources, they are calibrated via observed visibilities of one of the four calibrators.
