= 3C 286 =

Quasar often used for calibration

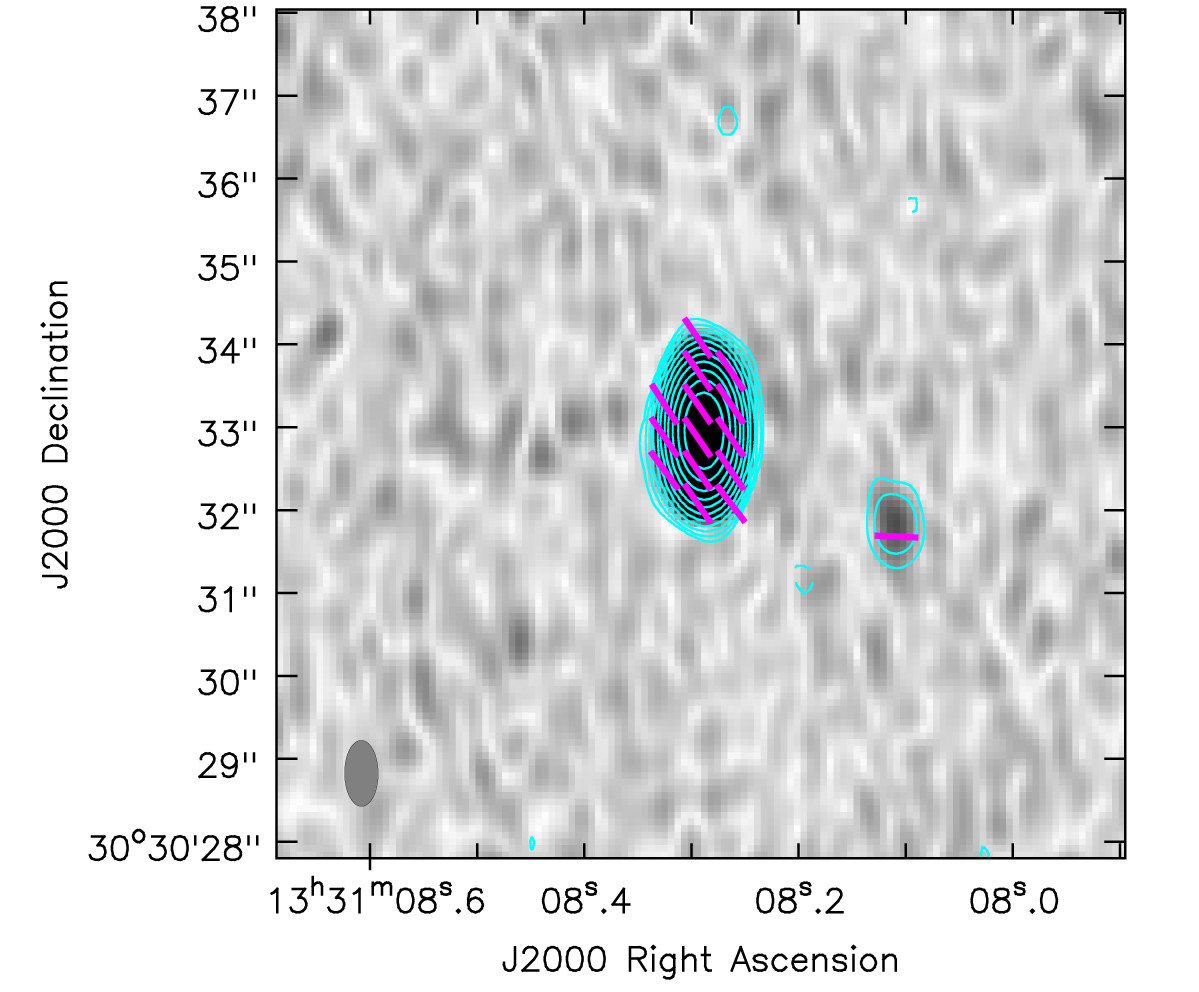
- Quasar 3C 286 as observed with ALMA. The elliptical shape of the image is caused by ALMA's noncircular point spread function (shown in grey in the bottom left of the image).

Observation data (Epoch J2000)
- Constellation: Canes Venatici
- Right ascension: 13^{h} 31^{m} 08.28811^{s}
- Declination: +30° 30′ 32.9600″
- Redshift: 0.8493
- Apparent magnitude (V): 17.25

Other designations
- 1328+307, Gaia DR2 1468213889872439040, 2MASS J13310829+3030331, PGC 2817650, GALEX 2699707895614802164

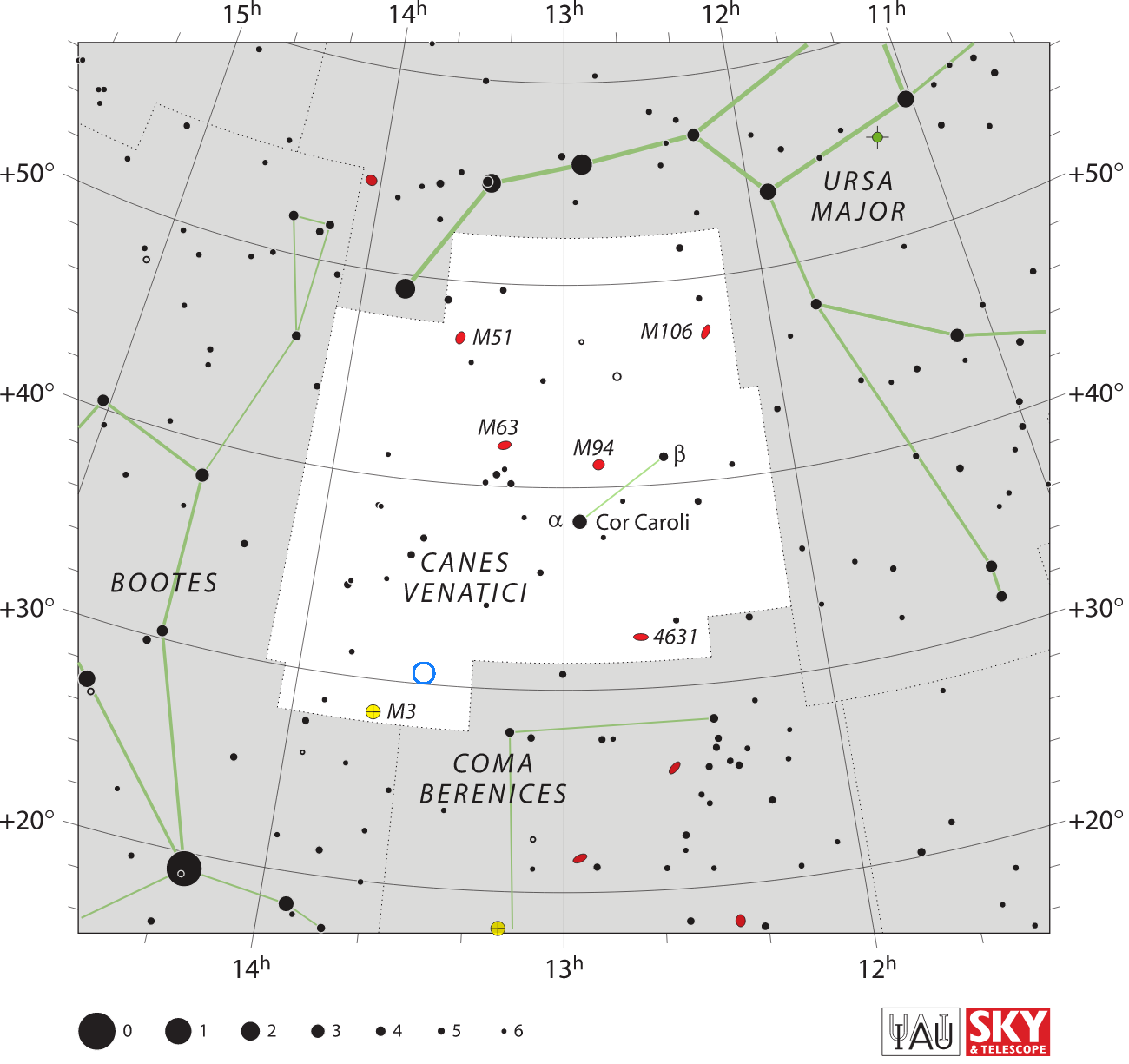
The location of 3C 286 (circled in blue)

3C 286, also known by its position as 1328+307 (B1950 coordinates) or 1331+305 (J2000 coordinates), is a quasar at redshift 0.8493 with a radial velocity of 164,137 km/s.It is part of the Third Cambridge Catalogue of Radio Sources (3C Survey).

The 3C Survey was conducted at the relatively low radio frequencies of 159 and 178 MHz. The total power measurements were made with an instrument that produced a 4.6 degree by 13.6 arc minute fan-beam, and interferometric measurements were made with a synthesized beam width of about 7.5 arc minutes. Those beams were too broad to produce coordinates precise enough to allow the radio source to be matched with a corresponding faint optical counterpart. In 1962, 3C 286 was observed with the higher frequency two-element interferometer at Owens Valley Radio Observatory, which produced improved source coordinates with a precision of ~10 arc seconds. With the new coordinates, observations at the Palomar Observatory allowed the optical counterpart to be unambiguously identified: a magnitude 17.25 object with a star-like appearance. Because of this early identification of an optical counterpart, 3C 286 was one of the objects described in the paper where the term quaser was first used.

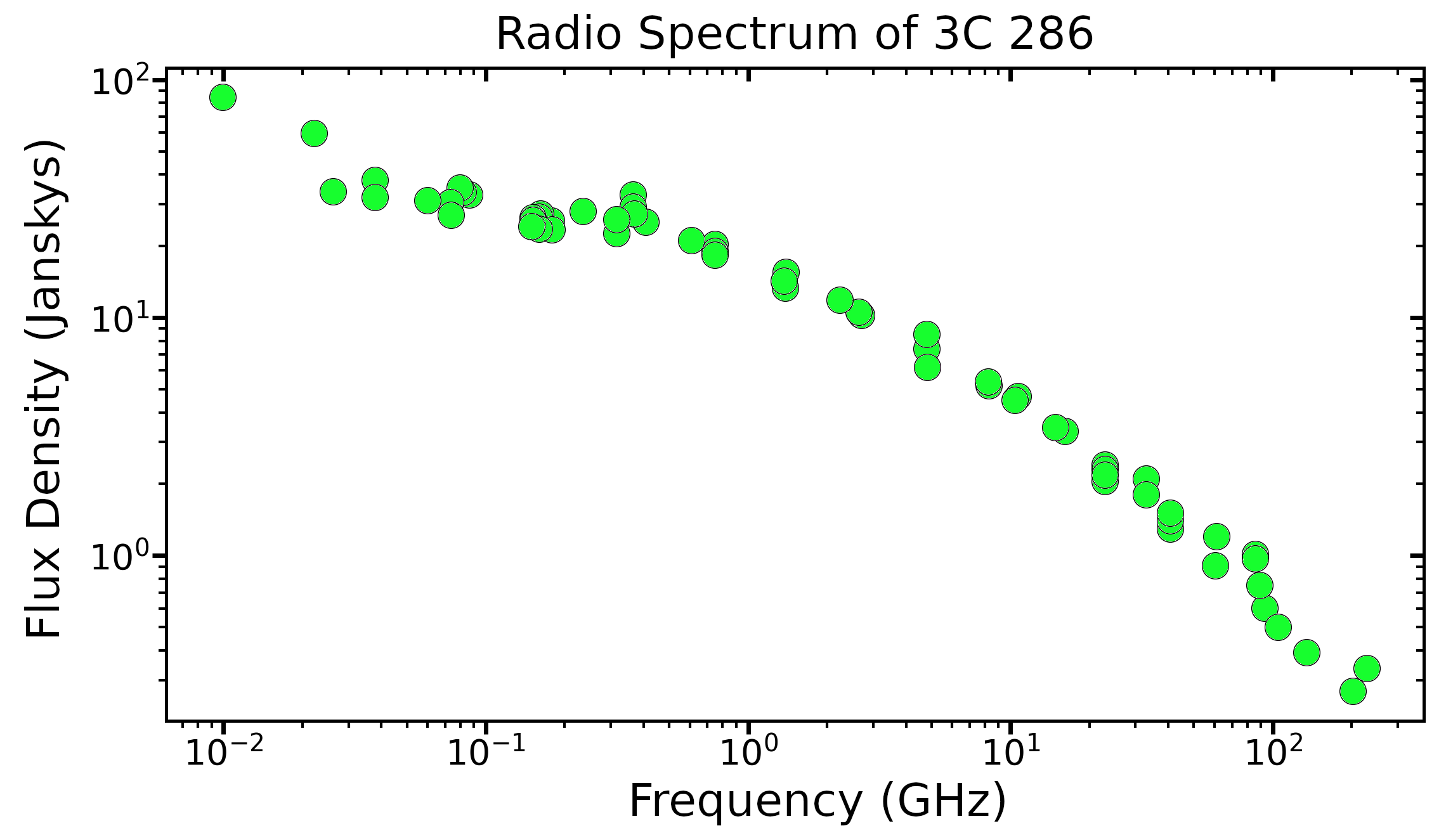
The radio wave spectral flux density of 3C 286, from 10 MHz to 230 GHz. Plotted from data presented in An et al., 2017.

3C 286 is a Compact Steep Spectrum (CSS) source, which means that its size is less than 15 kiloparsecs (13.7 in the case of 3C 286), and the observed spectral flux density is proportional to ν^{α}, where ν is the frequency and α ≤ -0.5 (in the case of 3C 286 α ≈ -0.61). CSS sources may be relatively young, with jets that are still expanding. While CSS sources represent a large fraction of the radio galaxies found in flux limited surveys, 3C 286 is one of only two CSS sources whose γ-rays were detected by Fermi-LAT.

High resolution images made at 8.4 GHz with the Very Large Array show that 3C 286 has a jet about 2.6 arc seconds long extending west-south-west from the core, and a counter jet extending 0.8 arc seconds east from the core. Emission from the jet to the west-south-west is highly polarized, with E-vectors parallel to the jet axis.

3C 286 is one of four primary calibrators used by the Very Large Array (along with 3C 48, 3C 138, and 3C 147). Visibilities of all other sources are calibrated using observed visibilities of one of these four calibrators. It is an important calibrator for polarization measurements made by radio interferometers, because it has a relatively high degree of linear polarization (~10% at a wavelength of 20 cm, increasing to ~17% at 1.3 mm), and the angle of polarization does not change with time (although it is not independent of the wavelength observed).
