= PKS 1127−145 =

Quasar in the constellation Crater

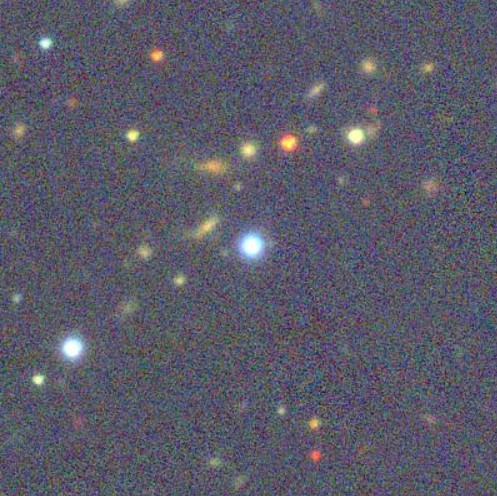
- The quasar, PKS 1127−145.

Observation data (J2000.0 epoch)
- Constellation: Crater
- Right ascension: 11^{h} 30^{m} 07.0526^{s}
- Declination: −14° 49′ 27.388″
- Redshift: 1.180000
- Heliocentric radial velocity: 353,755 km/s
- Distance: 8.170 Gly
- Apparent magnitude (V): 17.17
- Apparent magnitude (B): 16.90

Characteristics
- Type: Blazar, LPQ, FSRQ
- Notable features: Longest X-ray jet detected in a high redshift quasar

Other designations
- INTREF 453, 2E 2471, LEDA 2826758, 4FGL J1129.8−1447, WMAP 157, QSO B1127−1432, PKS 1127−14, OHIO M -146, PMN J1130−1449

PKS 1127−145 is a radio-loud quasar located in the constellation of Crater. This is a Gigahertz Peaked Spectrum object with a redshift of (z) 1.187, first discovered by astronomers in 1966. Its radio spectrum appears to be flat making it a flat-spectrum radio quasar, or an FSRQ in short.

== Description ==
PKS 1127−145 displays blazar-like behavior. It is known to undergo a period of gamma ray activity, especially in December 2020 where its daily gamma ray flux reached a peak of (E > 100 MeV) of (1.6 ± 0.3) × 10^{−6} photons cm^{−2} s^{−1}. Two flares were detected by Fermi-LAT in May and October 2022.

The radio structure of PKS 1127−145 is found to be complex. A radio image made by the Very Long Baseline Interferometry (VLBI) shows the object has two components, mainly a bright component and a much weaker component with same brightness temperatures of 1.3 × 10^{11} Kelvin. No extension is found in northwest direction. There is a presence of a compact core displaying strong increase of flux density with the outermost component being separated into several smaller regions enveloped completely by emission. A stationary feature is also seen located 4 mas from the core via a 22 GHz image taken by VLBI. Circular polarization has also been found in the quasar as well.

== X-ray jet ==
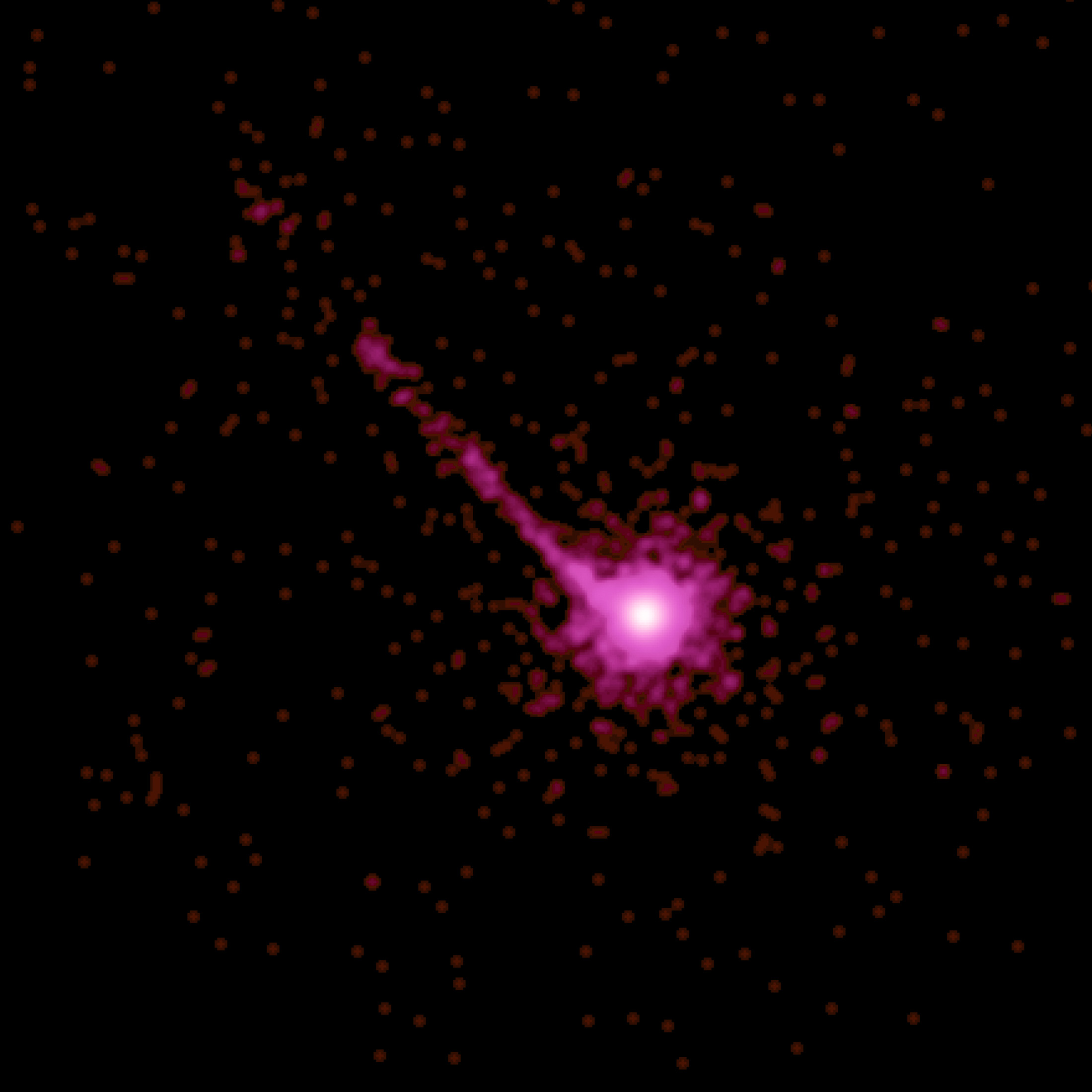
Chandra image of the X-ray jet in PKS 1127−145

An X-ray jet has been discovered in PKS 1127−145 by Chandra X-ray Observatory. With an estimated length of 300 kiloparsecs, this makes it the longest detected so far in any high redshift quasar. Advanced CCD Imaging Spectrometer also revealed a complex structure in the X-ray jet from the core with bright knots of different morphologies. Two of the knots showed changes in their profiles while the other knot is fainter with presence of X-ray emission scattered over a large area.

A more in-depth analysis of the X-ray jet in PKS 1127−145 showed the inner jet of PKS 1127−145 located from the core is found to be extremely polarized and a parallel magnetic field towards the jet's axis. Upon reaching 18 arcseconds from the core, the jet suddenly bends slightly causing the re-brightening of radio emission. In additional, there is a 90° rotation of the magnetic field suggesting it might be compressed to the plane that is found perpendicular to the axis.
