= Contrafreeloading =

Observed behavior in animals

Contrafreeloading is an observed behavior in which an organism, when offered a choice between provided food or food that requires effort to obtain, prefers the food that requires effort.

The concept was introduced in 1963 by animal psychologist Glen Jensen. In his original study, around 200 rats were given a choice between food in a bowl and a food dispenser which required that the rat step on the pedal a set number of times. In this experiment, Jensen found that the rats chose the foot pedal option as a function of the number of foot presses required to receive the food reward. Similar studies by Jensen and other researchers have since replicated his findings with gerbils and other animals including canines, mice, rats, birds, fish, monkeys and chimpanzees. The only animal that did not display similar behavior was the domesticated cat, which preferred to be served.

== Sources ==
- The Free Food (contrafreeloading) Phenomenon: A Review and analysis
