= Thomas A. Matthews =

American astronomer

- Education: University of Toronto, BA 1950 Case Institute of Technology, MSc 1951 Harvard University, PhD 1956
- Known for: Discovery of the first Quasar and work in radioastronomy
- Scientific career
- Doctoral advisor: Bart Bok

Thomas A. Matthews is an American astronomer. He is credited with being one of the discoverers of the first quasar, 3C 48, in 1960 using a new interferometer at the Owens Valley Radio Observatory, along with Allan Sandage.

Matthews received his PhD from Harvard University in 1956. His advisor was Bart Bok.
