= Omicron Aurigae =

Star in the constellation Auriga

- Location of ο Aurigae (circled in red)

Observation data Epoch J2000.0 Equinox J2000.0 (ICRS)
- Constellation: Auriga
- Right ascension: 05^{h} 45^{m} 54.042^{s}
- Declination: +49° 49′ 34.58″
- Apparent magnitude (V): +5.47

Characteristics
- Spectral type: A1 Cr Eu
- U−B color index: +0.02
- B−V color index: +0.02

Astrometry
Radial velocity (R_{v})	−7.7±0.9 km/s
Proper motion (μ)	RA: −11.087 mas/yr Dec.: +3.703 mas/yr
Parallax (π)	8.1876±0.2643 mas
Distance	400 ± 10 ly (122 ± 4 pc)
Absolute magnitude (M_{V})	−0.03

Details
Mass	1.9 M_{☉}
Radius	3.2 R_{☉}
Luminosity	50 L_{☉}
Surface gravity (log g)	3.7 cgs
Temperature	8,300 K
Rotational velocity (v sin i)	35.2±5.3 km/s
Age	657 Myr

Other designations
- ο Aur, 27 Aur, BD+49°1398, FK5 216, HD 38104, HIP 27196, HR 1971, SAO 40583

Database references
SIMBAD	data

Omicron Aurigae is an astrometric binary star system in the northern constellation of Auriga. Its name is a Bayer designation that is Latinized from ο Aurigae, and abbreviated Omicron Aur or ο Aur. With an apparent visual magnitude of 5.47, it is faintly visible to the naked eye. Based upon an annual parallax shift of 8.19 mas, it is approximately 400 light-years (120 parsecs) distant from Earth. It is drifting closer to the Sun with a radial velocity of −8 km/s. The star is a member of the Ursa Major stream of co-moving stars.

The visible component is a chemically peculiar star with a stellar classification of A1 Cr Eu; meaning this is an A-type star with a spectrum that shows anomalously high abundances of chromium (Cr) and europium (Eu). A magnetic field has been detected and it is a source of X-ray emission with a luminosity of: log L_{x} = 29.1. The star has 1.9 times the mass of the Sun and 3.2 times the Sun's radius. It is spinning with a projected rotational velocity of 35 km/s and is radiating 50 times the Sun's luminosity from its photosphere at an effective temperature of 8,300 K.
