= 3C 48 =

Quasar discovered in 1960

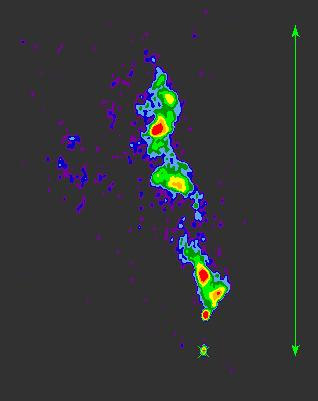
- Radio map of the quasar 3C48 made from VLBA 1.4-GHz observations.

Observation data (Epoch J2000)
- Constellation: Triangulum
- Right ascension: 01^{h} 37^{m} 41.1^{s}
- Declination: +33° 09′ 32″
- Redshift: 110024 km/s 0.367
- Distance: 3.9 billion light-years (Light travel time); 4.5 billion light-years (present)
- Type: E
- Apparent dimensions (V): 0.6′ × 0.5′
- Apparent magnitude (V): 16.2
- Notable features: First quasar discovered

Other designations
- PG 0134+329, QSO B0134+329, PGC 73991

3C48 is a quasar discovered in 1960; it was the second source conclusively identified as such.

3C48 was the first source in the Third Cambridge Catalogue of Radio Sources for which an optical identification was found by Allan Sandage and Thomas A. Matthews in 1960 through interferometry. In 1963 Jesse L. Greenstein and Thomas Matthews found that it had a redshift of 0.367, making it one of the highest redshift sources then known. It was not until 1982 that the surrounding faint galactic "nebulosity" was confirmed to have the same redshift as 3C48, cementing its identification as an object in a distant galaxy. This was also the first solid identification of a quasar with a surrounding galaxy at the same redshift.

3C 48 is one of four primary calibrators used by the Very Large Array (along with 3C 138 and 3C 147, and 3C 286). Visibilities of all other sources are calibrated using observed visibilities of one of these four calibrators.

Studies have confirmed 3C 48 is found currently in the process of an advanced galaxy merger stage, with the budge components only 2.5 kiloparsecs from each other. This merger resulted from the collision of two similar disk galaxies. A radio jet on one side, is found based on radio imaging, with signs of faint radio emission. This jet is also suggested as disrupted.

== Nomenclature ==
The name of the object "3C 48" consists of two significant parts. The first part, "3C," means that the object belongs to the Third Cambridge Catalog of Radio Sources. The second part - "48" - is the serial number in the catalog ordered by right ascension.
