= UNCOVER =

James Webb near-infrared survey

UNCOVER, or Ultradeep NIRSpec and NIRCam ObserVations before the Epoch of Reionization, was a general observer survey program on the James Webb Space Telescope that imaged the Abell 2744 cluster between November 2022 and July 2024. The large treasury program aimed to make use of Abell 2744's gravitational lensing to observe the earliest galaxies formed at the beginning of the epoch of reionization. Imaging from the program was used to discover several extremely distant objects, such as UNCOVER-z13 and UNCOVER-z12.

== Program ==
UNCOVER was awarded over 100 hours of combined observation time in Cycle 1 of the JWST general observer program, which awarded a total of about 6000 hours to 266 programs. The program began with initial observations in November 2022, with follow-up observations in July/August 2023 and July 2024 on objects of interest.

== Notable discoveries ==
- QSO1, a black hole at an approximate redshift of z=7.6, possibly exceeding QSO_J0313−1806, the most distant black hole known at the time, before the discovery of UHZ1 in November 2023 at z=10.1. Notable as being surrounded by a very small galaxy, challenging theories of early galaxy and black hole formation.
- UNCOVER-z13 and UNCOVER-z12, high-redshift Lyman-break galaxies, among the most distant known astronomical objects.
