= Abell 2744-QSO1 =

Supermassive black hole

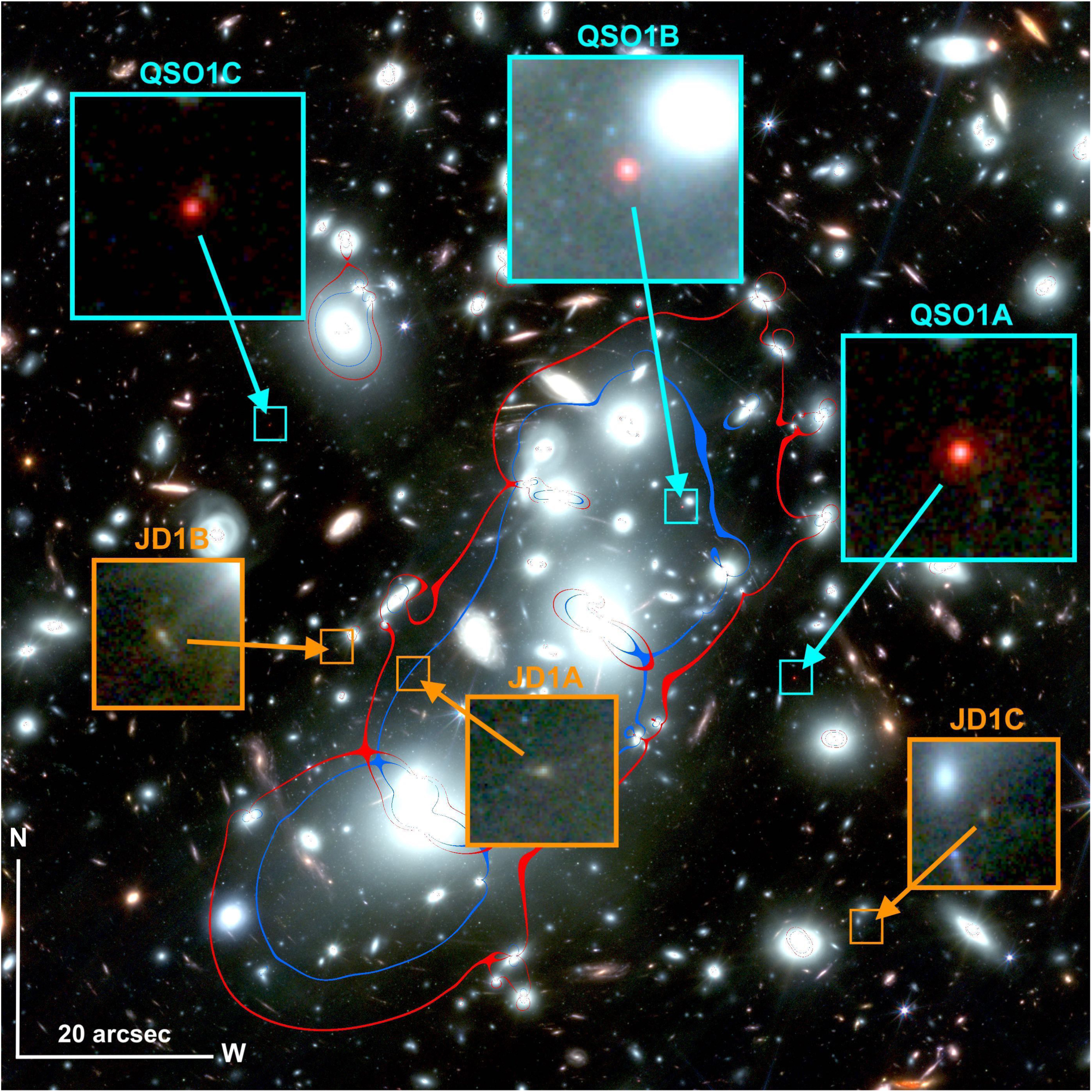
Deep field James Webb Space Telescope image of Abell 2744-QSO1 (teal); scale in arc seconds. The JD1 sequence (mustard) features a like example of a gravitational lens.

Pandora's Cluster, composite image by the James Webb Space Telescope, NIRCam

Abell 2744-QSO1, also known as QSO1, is a little red dot and active galactic nucleus at a redshift of z = 7.04, corresponding to a time about 700 million years after the Big Bang. It is strongly gravitationally lensed and appears as three images behind the galaxy cluster Abell 2744. Observations with the James Webb Space Telescope have identified an accreting supermassive black hole with a dynamically measured mass of approximately 50 million solar masses. The black hole is more massive than the inferred stellar component surrounding it, with a black-hole-to-stellar-mass ratio greater than two, making the object an important example for studies of how massive black-hole seeds formed in the early universe.

First observed by the James Webb Space Telescope (under the aegis of the UNCOVER programme) in 2023, QSO1 is in the class of little red dots, a class of small red cosmological objects discovered by the JWST over its first few years whose general nature is actively debated. Located behind Pandora's Cluster in the constellation Sculptor, QSO1 is triply imaged by the cluster's gravity. It was potentially the most distant black hole upon discovery, possibly exceeding QSO J0313−1806, before the discovery of UHZ1. It is the first of the little red dots to have its mass directly measured (through observations of the vortex surrounding it), confirming the effectiveness of indirect mass measurements based on the whole object's spectrum for other little red dots.

The unusually large ratio between the black-hole mass and the surrounding stellar mass places strong constraints on models for the object's origin. The 2026 dynamical measurement found a black-hole-to-stellar-mass ratio greater than two, several orders of magnitude above the relation observed in nearby galaxies. Together with the extremely low metallicity measured around QSO1, this suggests that the black hole formed from a relatively massive seed and was observed during an early stage of its growth.

Possible formation mechanisms include a direct-collapse black hole formed from a massive gas cloud or a primordial black hole formed in the early universe. Neither interpretation is established. Conventional direct-collapse models have difficulty producing the observed ratio of black-hole mass to surrounding dynamical mass and often require environmental conditions not observed around QSO1, while a primordial origin would require substantial subsequent accretion or merging to reach the measured mass of approximately 50 million solar masses. The object's near-pristine environment therefore provides an important constraint on models of early supermassive-black-hole formation.

== See also ==
- JWST UNCOVER Program
