= ULAS J1120+0641 =

One of the most distant quasars known

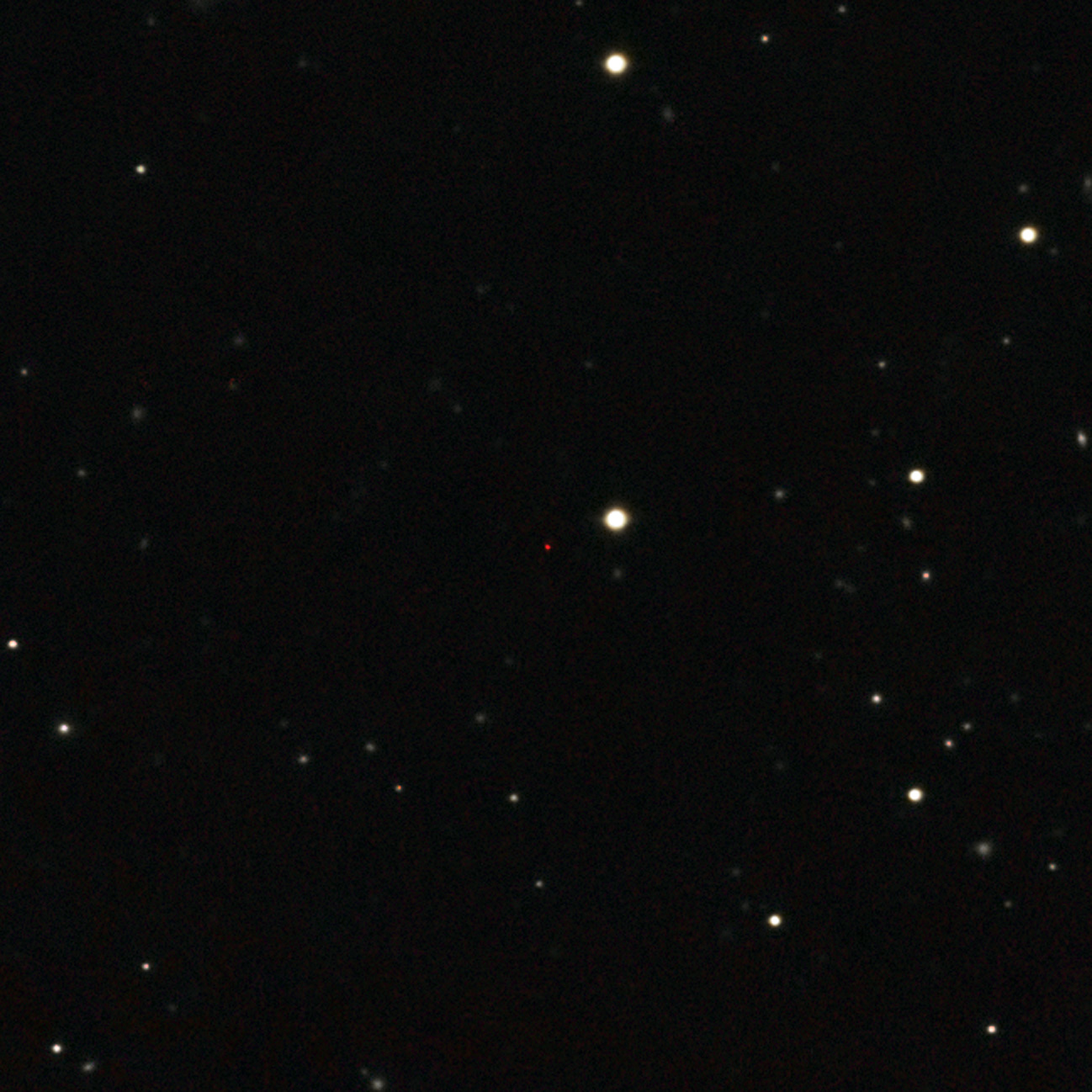
- Composite image of ULAS J1120+0641 created from the Sloan Digital Sky Survey and the UKIRT Infrared Deep Sky Survey. The quasar appears as a faint red dot close to the centre.

Observation data (Epoch J2000.0)
- Constellation: Leo
- Right ascension: 11^{h} 20^{m} 01.48^{s}
- Declination: +06° 41′ 24.3″
- Redshift: 7.085±0.003
- Distance: 28.85 Gly (8.85 Gpc) (co-moving); 12.9 Gly (4.0 Gpc) (light travel distance)

Other designations
- ULAS J112001.48+064124.3, ULAS J1120+0641

ULAS J1120+0641 was the most distant known quasar when discovered in 2011, surpassed in 2017 by ULAS J1342+0928. ULAS J1120+0641 (at projected comoving distance of 28.85 billion light-years (Note: This is greater than the estimated age of the light from the most distant observable objects, yet is not in contradiction. See Distance measures (cosmology) which explains the distance measures used in cosmology.)) was the first quasar discovered beyond a redshift of z = 7. Its discovery was reported in June 2011. (Note: Various news reports, including those provided by the Associated Press, have stated that it is the brightest object seen so far in the universe. Such statements are erroneous, however; other quasars are known to be at least 100 times more luminous.)

== Discovery ==
ULAS J1120+0641 was discovered by the UKIRT Infrared Deep Sky Survey (UKIDSS), using the UK Infrared Telescope, located in Hawaii. The name of the object is derived from UKIDSS Large Area Survey (ULAS), the name of the survey that discovered the quasar, and the location of the quasar in the sky in terms of right ascension (11h 20m) and declination (+06° 41'). This places the quasar in the constellation of Leo, close (on the plane of the sky) to σ Leo. The quasar was discovered by a telescope that operates at infrared wavelengths, which is at longer wavelength and lower energy than visible light. When the light was originally emitted by ULAS J1120+0641, it was in the ultraviolet, with shorter wavelength and higher energy than visible light. The change in energy and wavelength of the light is due to the expanding universe, which imparts a cosmological redshift to all light as it travels through the universe.

The team of scientists spent years searching the UKIDSS for a quasar whose redshift was higher than 6.5. ULAS J1120+0641 is even farther away than they hoped for, with a redshift greater than 7.

UKIDSS is a near infrared photometric survey, so the original discovery was only a photometric redshift of $z_{phot}>6.5$. Before announcing their discovery, the team used spectroscopy on the Gemini North Telescope and the Very Large Telescope to obtain a spectroscopic redshift of 7.085±0.003.

== Description ==
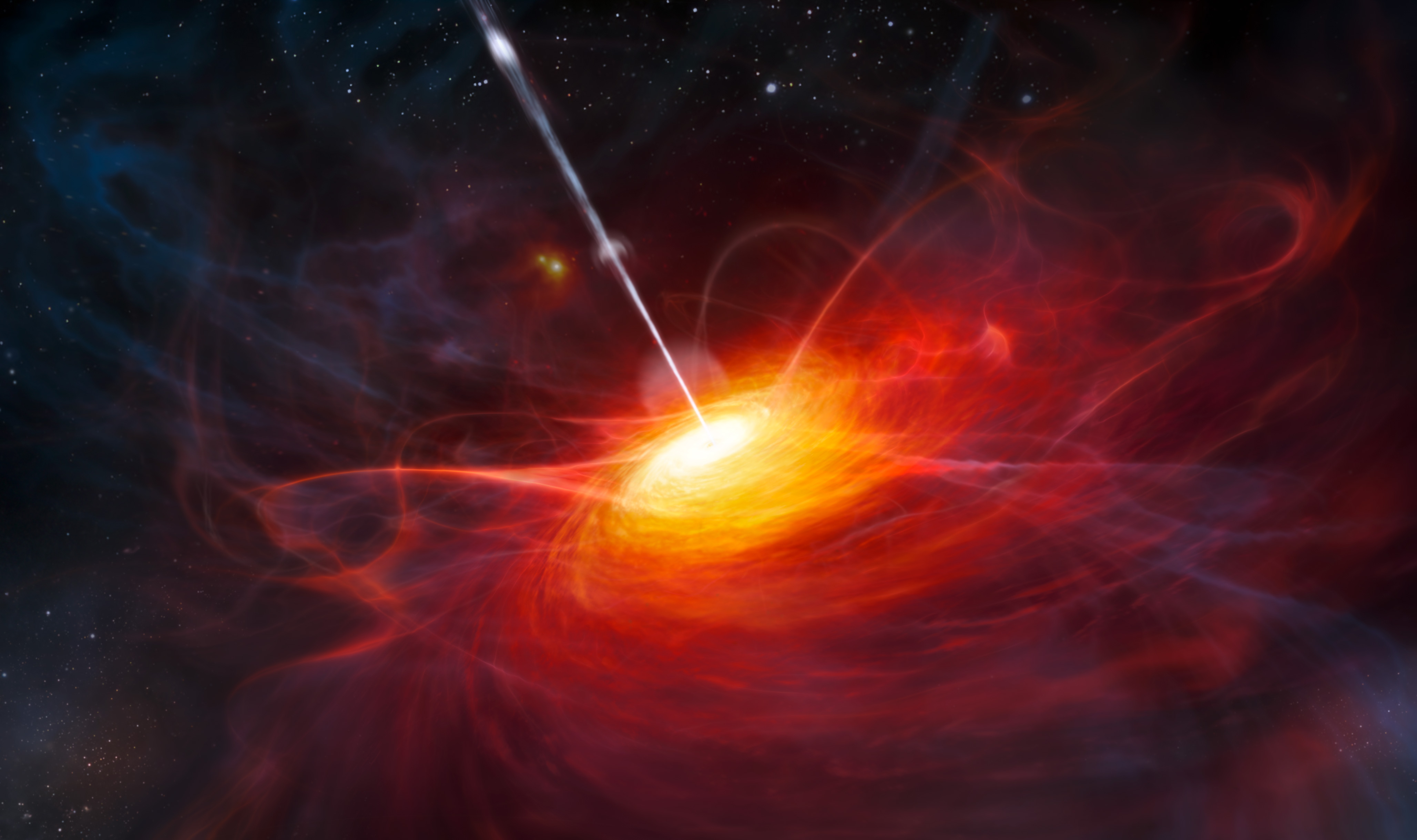
Artist's rendering of ULAS J1120+0641.

ULAS J1120+0641 has a measured redshift of 7.085, which corresponds to a comoving distance of 28.85 billion light-years from Earth. As of June 2011, it is the most distant quasar yet observed. The quasar emitted the light observed on Earth today less than 770 million years after the Big Bang, about 13 billion years ago. This is 100 million years earlier than light from the most distant previously known quasar.

The quasar's luminosity is estimated at 6.3×10^{13} solar luminosities. This energy output is generated by a supermassive black hole estimated at 2+1.5
−0.7×10^{9} solar masses. While the black hole powers the quasar, the light does not come from the black hole itself. Daniel Mortlock, lead author of the paper that announced the discovery of ULAS J1120+0641, explained, "The super-massive black hole itself is dark but it has a disc of gas or dust around it that has become so hot that it will outshine an entire galaxy of stars."

== Significance ==
The light from ULAS J1120+0641 was emitted before the end of the theoretically predicted transition of the intergalactic medium from an electrically neutral to an ionized state (the epoch of reionization). Quasars may have been an important energy source in this process, which marked the end of the cosmic Dark Ages, so observing a quasar from before the transition is of major interest to theoreticians. Because of their high ultraviolet luminosity, quasars also are some of the best sources for studying the reionization process.

This is the first time scientists have seen a quasar with such a large fraction of neutral (non-ionized) hydrogen absorption in its spectrum. Mortlock estimates that 10% to 50% of the hydrogen at the redshift of ULAS J1120+0641 is neutral. The neutral hydrogen fraction in all other quasars seen, even those only 100 million years younger, was typically 1% or less. The spectrum also lacked any significant indication of non-BBN metals. The combination of the neutral hydrogen reading, and lack of metals is suggestive of the quasar being embedded in a protogalaxy in the midst of forming, and possibly creating the first Population III stars for the galaxy, or a pre-protogalaxy core still embedded in the primordial hydrogen fog, predating the Population III stellar population for this galaxy.

The supermassive black hole in ULAS J1120+0641 has a higher mass than was expected. The Eddington limit sets a maximum rate at which a black hole can grow, so the existence of such a massive black hole so soon after the Big Bang implies that it must have formed with a very high initial mass, through the merging of thousands of smaller black holes, or that the standard model of cosmology requires revision.

== See also ==
- List of most distant astronomical objects
- List of quasars
- J0313–1806 − most distant quasar (z=7.64)

== Notes ==
Records
Preceded by CFHQS J2329-0301	Most distant quasar 2011 – 2017	Succeeded by ULAS J1342+0928
