= A2744-JD =

Extremely distant galaxy in the constellation Sculptor

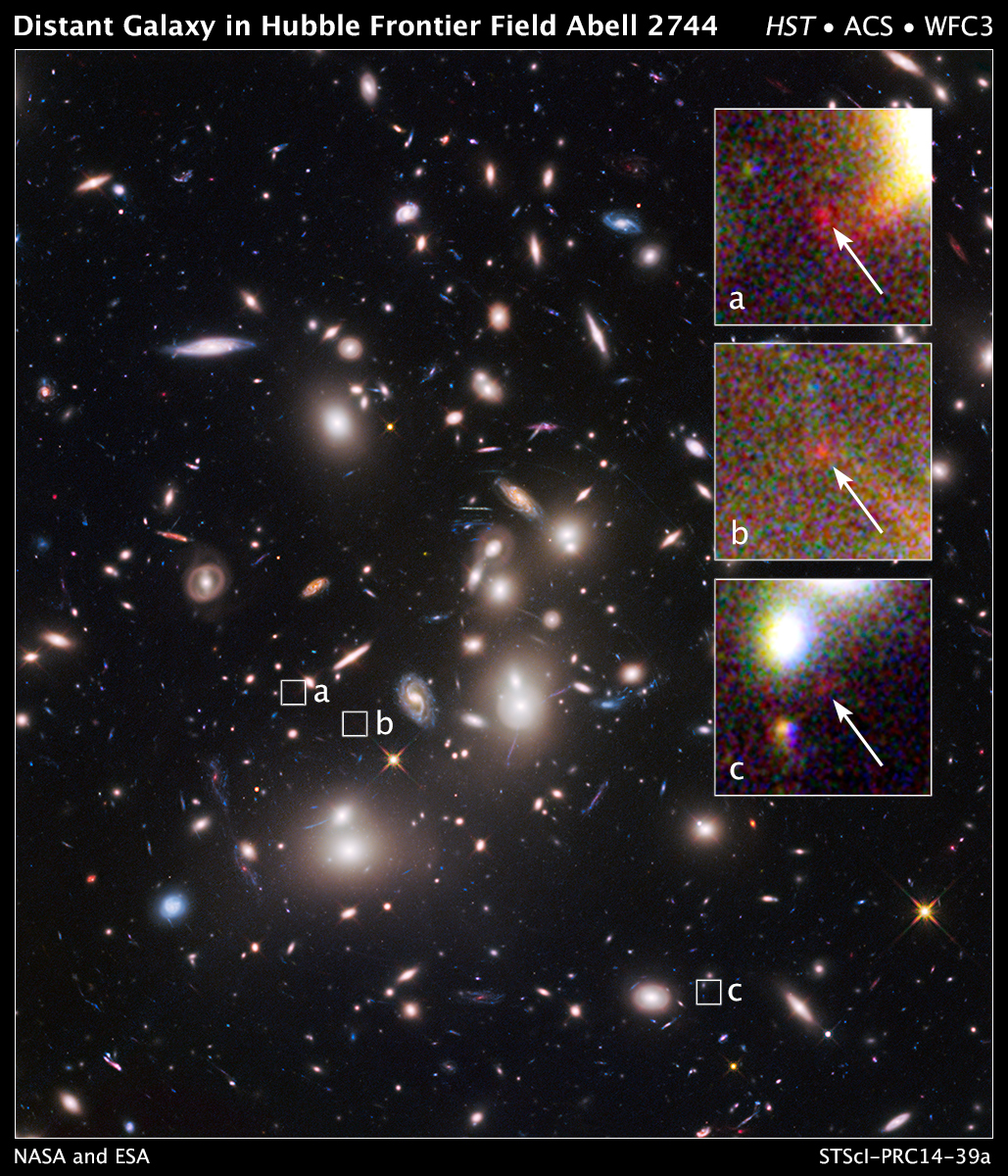

Observation data
- Constellation: Sculptor
- Right ascension: 00^{h} 14^{m} 21.2^{s}
- Declination: −30° 23′ 50.1″
- Redshift: ~9.8

Characteristics
- Size: 850 light years

A2744-JD is an extremely distant galaxy, identified with the Hubble Space Telescope through gravitational lensing, observing the massive galaxy cluster Abell 2744, also known as Pandora's Cluster. Due to the high redshift (z = ~10), a triple red spot image was obtained of a galaxy observed at an epoch when the Universe was about 500 million years after the Big Bang (approximately 3% of its current age) and whose light took more than 13 billion years to reach Earth. The gravitational lensing effect made it possible to enhance the image of such a distant and extremely faint galaxy by increasing its luminosity about 10 times.

A2744 is a small, primordial galaxy; at the time of the image, it is estimated to have a diameter of only 850 light-years, a mass of about 40 million solar masses, and a star formation rate of one star every three years.

The age of A2744-JD places this galaxy in the reionization phase of the Universe's evolution, a period in which extragalactic hydrogen was transitioning from a neutral to an ionized state. It has been hypothesized that these galaxies, formed early in the Universe's history, were one of the causes of the reionization process.
