= The Cliff (astronomical object) =

Compact extragalactic object

RUBIES-UDS-154183
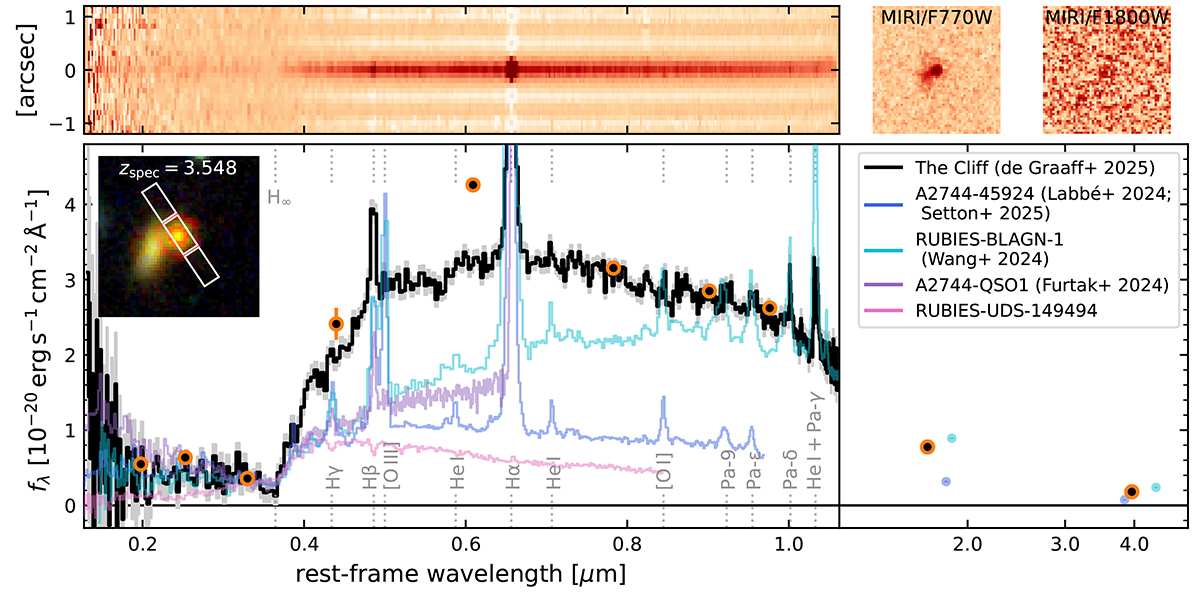
- NIRSpec/PRISM spectrum of The Cliff. The orange points show NIRCam and MIRI photometry.
- Object type: Little red dot
- Other designations: VANDELS UDS 024647, HSCS J021738-050747, RUBIES-UDS-154183, CANDELS UDS F160W J021738.59-050746.9, ZFOURGE UDS 18793, [GGF2013] 24647, [SWM2014] UDS 43002

Observation data (Epoch J2000)
- Constellation: Cetus
- Right ascension: 02^{h} 17^{m} 38.58^{s}
- Declination: −05° 07′ 46.79″
- Redshift: 3.548
- Apparent magnitude: 26.718, 25.814, 25.505, 25.197, 24.7611, 23.957, 23.23, 27.783, 25.3882, 25.4561

The Cliff (RUBIES-UDS-154183) is a compact extragalactic object observed as a little red dot with an exceptional (and cliff-like) Balmer jump. It was discovered as part of the James Webb Space Telescope's Red Unknowns: Bright Infrared Extragalactic Survey (RUBIES) in 2024 in the Ultra Deep Survey (UDS). Detailed spectrographic study suggests that it may be a black hole star.

A spectroscopically similar object, MoM-BH*-1, was reported contemporaneously by an overlapping team, and subsequent observations of other little red dots have provided further evidence for the dense-gas, accreting-black-hole interpretation.
