= 3DHST-AEGIS-12014 =

Compact astronomical object in the constellation Ursa Major

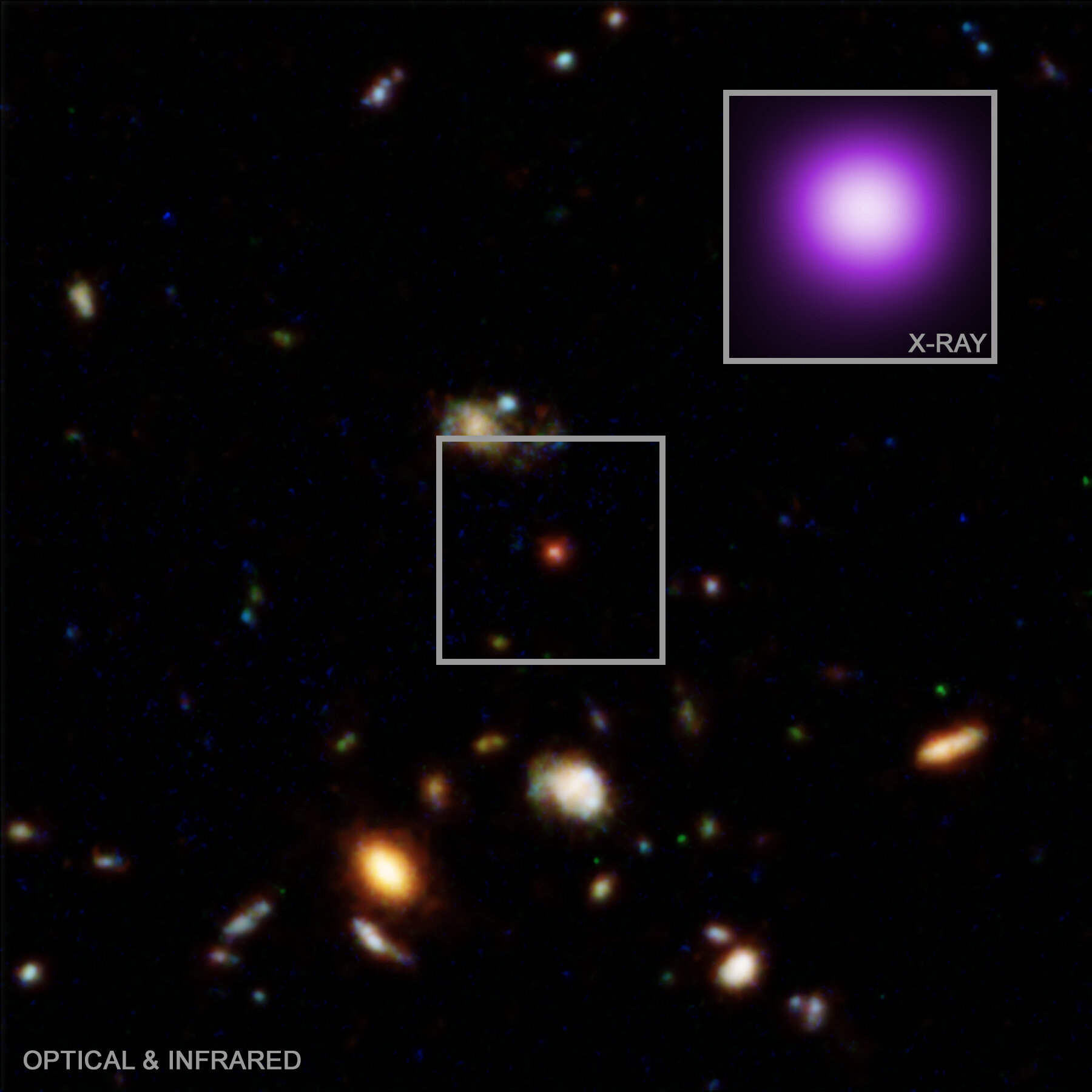
- X-ray, Infrared, and Optical images of X-ray Dot 3DHST-AEGIS-12014

Observation data
- Constellation: Ursa Major
- Right ascension: 14^{h} 20^{m} 47.498^{s}
- Declination: +53° 02′ 32.83″
- Redshift: 3.278
- Distance: 11.856 billion light-years (light travel distance); 22.057 billion light-years (proper distance)

Characteristics
- Type: LRD
- Half-light radius (physical): >100 pc

3DHST-AEGIS-12014 (also known as X-Ray Dot) is a compact, high-redshift astronomical object located in the constellation Ursa Major. As of 2026, it is one of the most thoroughly studied objects of its class due to the discovery of a direct correlation between its infrared and X-ray emissions.

== Discovery ==
The object was first detected during the 3D-HST survey in 2014-2015, conducted using the Hubble Space Telescope. At that time, it was simply classified as one of millions of distant red galaxies in the AEGIS field. Due to the limited capabilities of instruments at the time, it was considered a compact star cluster.

With the commencement of the James Webb Space Telescope's operations in 2023-2024, astronomers gained the ability to peer through dust. Using the NIRSpec instrument, broad hydrogen lines were detected, indicating the presence of a powerful gravitational center, i.e., a black hole. The object was then categorized as a little red dot.

In April 2026, a research team led by Raphael Hvidving (Max Planck Institute for Astronomy) applied a new analysis method. They correlated JWST data with archival data from the Chandra X-ray Observatory, accumulated over 20 years of deep scanning of this region of the sky.

== Characteristics ==
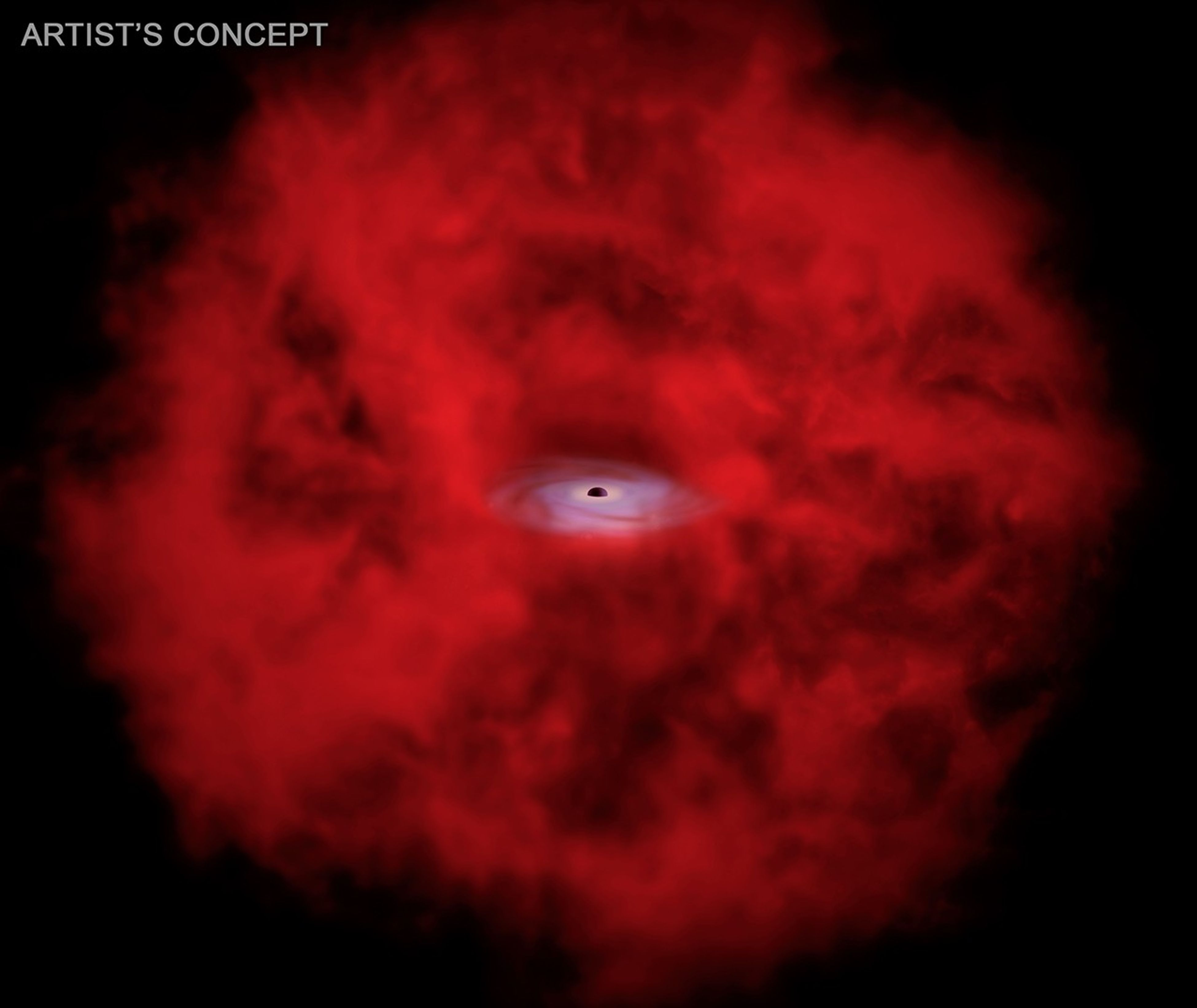
Artistic representation Little Red Dot, 3DHST-AEGIS-12014

The object is classified as a Little Red Dot (LRD) and represents an early-stage active galactic nucleus (AGN). Its redshift is 3.278, meaning we are observing it as it was just 2 billion years after the Big Bang. According to the current ΛCDM parameters, this redshift corresponds to a light-travel distance (lookback time) of 11.856 billion years. However, due to the expansion of the Universe, its comoving distance is 22.057 Gly. The object's effective radius is less than 100 parsecs, which is approximately 326 light-years. Its bolometric luminosity is estimated at 5×10^{44} erg/s, placing this object among the most powerful active galactic nuclei. Infrared data indicate the presence of a significant amount of hot dust within the object's structure. The temperature of this material ranges from 1700 to 3700 K.

Unlike most other LRDs, this object shines distinctly in the X-ray range. Its X-ray luminosity reaches 10^{44.18} erg/s. Spectroscopy obtained with JWST revealed broad Balmer lines. The width of these lines indicates that the gas at the object's center is rotating around the gravitational center at speeds of thousands of kilometers per second. Archival data from the Chandra observatory have shown that the X-ray flux from the object is unstable. Such variability is characteristic of compact regions around black holes, rather than distributed starlight.

== Object Nature ==
Researchers suggest that the X-Ray Dot represents a transitional stage from LRD to a typical growing supermassive black hole. As the black hole accretes surrounding gas, inhomogeneities appear in the gas clouds. This allows X-rays from the matter falling onto the black hole to escape, which is observed by the Chandra telescope. Eventually, all the gas is accreted, and the black hole ceases to exist.

== See also ==
- Little Red Dots
- James Webb Space Telescope
- Chandra X-ray Observatory
