= ULAS J1342+0928 =

Third most distant quasar known located in the constellation Boötes

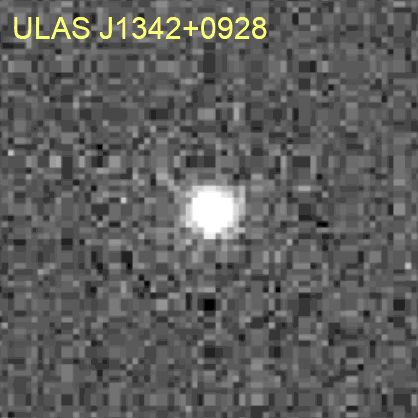
- ULAS J1342+0928 imaged by the Magellan telescope.

Observation data (Epoch J2000.0)
- Constellation: Boötes
- Right ascension: 13^{h} 42^{m} 08.10^{s}
- Declination: +09° 28′ 38.61″
- Redshift: 7.5413±0.0007
- Distance: 29.36 Gly (9.00 Gpc) (comoving distance); 13.1 Gly (4.0 Gpc) (light travel distance)

Other designations
- ULAS J134208.10+092838.61, Quasar20171206

ULAS J1342+0928 is the third-most distant known quasar detected and contains the second-most distant and oldest known supermassive black hole, at a reported redshift of z = 7.54. ULAS J1342+0928 is located in the constellation Boötes, and the supermassive black hole is measured to be 780 million times more massive than the Sun. At its discovery, it was the most distant known quasar until 2021, when it was superseded by QSO J0313-1806 as the most distant quasar.

== Discovery ==
On 6 December 2017, astronomers published that they had found the quasar using data from the Wide-field Infrared Survey Explorer (WISE) combined with ground-based surveys from the United Kingdom Infrared Telescope and the DECam Legacy Survey. It was spectroscopically confirmed using data from the Magellan Telescopes at Las Campanas Observatory in Chile, as well as the Large Binocular Telescope in Arizona and the Gemini North telescope in Hawaii. The related black hole of the quasar existed when the universe was about 690 million years old (about 5 percent of its currently known age of 13.80 billion years).

The quasar comes from a time known as "the epoch of reionization", when the universe emerged from its Dark Ages. Extensive amounts of dust and gas have been detected to be released from the quasar into the interstellar medium of its host galaxy.

== Description ==
ULAS J1342+0928 has a measured redshift of 7.54, which corresponds to a comoving distance of 29.36 billion light-years from Earth. When it was reported in 2017, it was the most distant quasar yet observed. The quasar emitted the light observed on Earth today less than 690 million years after the Big Bang, about 13.1 billion years ago.

The quasar's luminosity is estimated at 4×10^{13} solar luminosities. This energy output is generated by a supermassive black hole estimated at 7.8×10^{8} solar masses. According to lead astronomer Bañados, "This particular quasar is so bright that it will become a gold mine for follow-up studies and will be a crucial laboratory to study the early universe."

== Significance ==
The light from ULAS J1342+0928 was emitted before the end of the theoretically predicted transition of the intergalactic medium from an electrically neutral to an ionized state (the epoch of reionization). Quasars may have been an important energy source in this process, which marked the end of the cosmic Dark Ages, so observing a quasar from before the transition is of major interest to theoreticians. Because of their high ultraviolet luminosity, quasars also are some of the best sources for studying the reionization process. The discovery is also described as challenging theories of black hole formation, by having a supermassive black hole much larger than expected at such an early stage in the Universe's history, though this is not the first distant quasar to offer such a challenge.

== See also ==
- List of the most distant astronomical objects
- List of quasars
- J0313–1806

Records
Preceded by ULAS J1120+0641	Most distant known quasar 2017 – 2021	Succeeded by QSO J0313-1806
