= UNCOVER-z13 =

High-redshift galaxy in Sculptor constellation

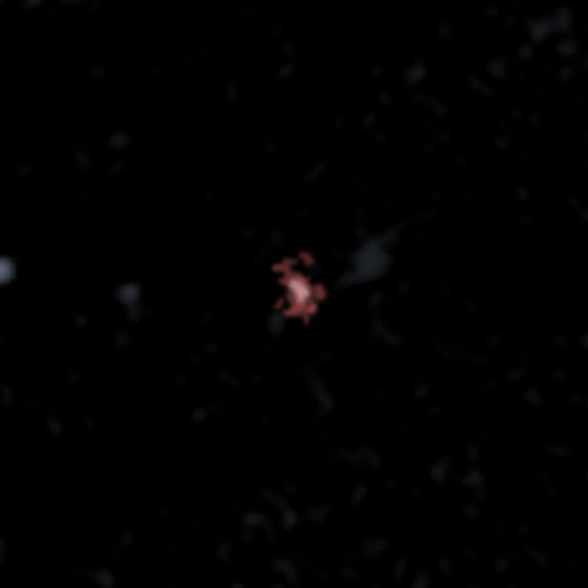
- UNCOVER-z13, as observed by the JWST on September 10, 2023

Observation data (J2000 epoch)
- Constellation: Sculptor
- Right ascension: 00^{h} 14^{m} 17.01^{s}
- Declination: −30° 24′ 05.7″
- Redshift: 13.079
- Distance: 13.457 billion light years (light travel distance); 32.560 billion light years (present proper distance)

Characteristics
- Type: Lyman-break galaxy

UNCOVER-z13 is a high-redshift Lyman-break galaxy discovered by the James Webb Space Telescope (JWST) during NIRCam imaging for the JWST Ultradeep NIRSpec and NIRCam Observations before the Epoch of Reionization (UNCOVER) project on November 14, 2023. UNCOVER-z13 is within Abell 2744 supercluster in the constellation Sculptor.

== Morphology ==
UNCOVER-z13 is a Lyman-Break galaxy, and not much more is known about the exact shape of the galaxy.

== Discovery ==
UNCOVER-z13 was first observed when large amounts of gravitational lensing from Abell 2744 made the galaxy visible. Abell 2744 is around 3.5 billion light-years away from the Milky Way. The gravity of Abell 2744 warps the fabric of space-time sufficiently to magnify the light of more faraway galaxies. The James Webb Space Telescope used the gravitational lensing to discover UNCOVER-z13.

== UNCOVER-z12 ==
UNCOVER-z12 is a second galaxy which was discovered around the same time. UNCOVER-z12 has a redshift of 12.393, making it the fourth-most distant object ever observed. It is a Lyman-Break galaxy, and was discovered using the same methods as UNCOVER-z13.

== Gallery ==
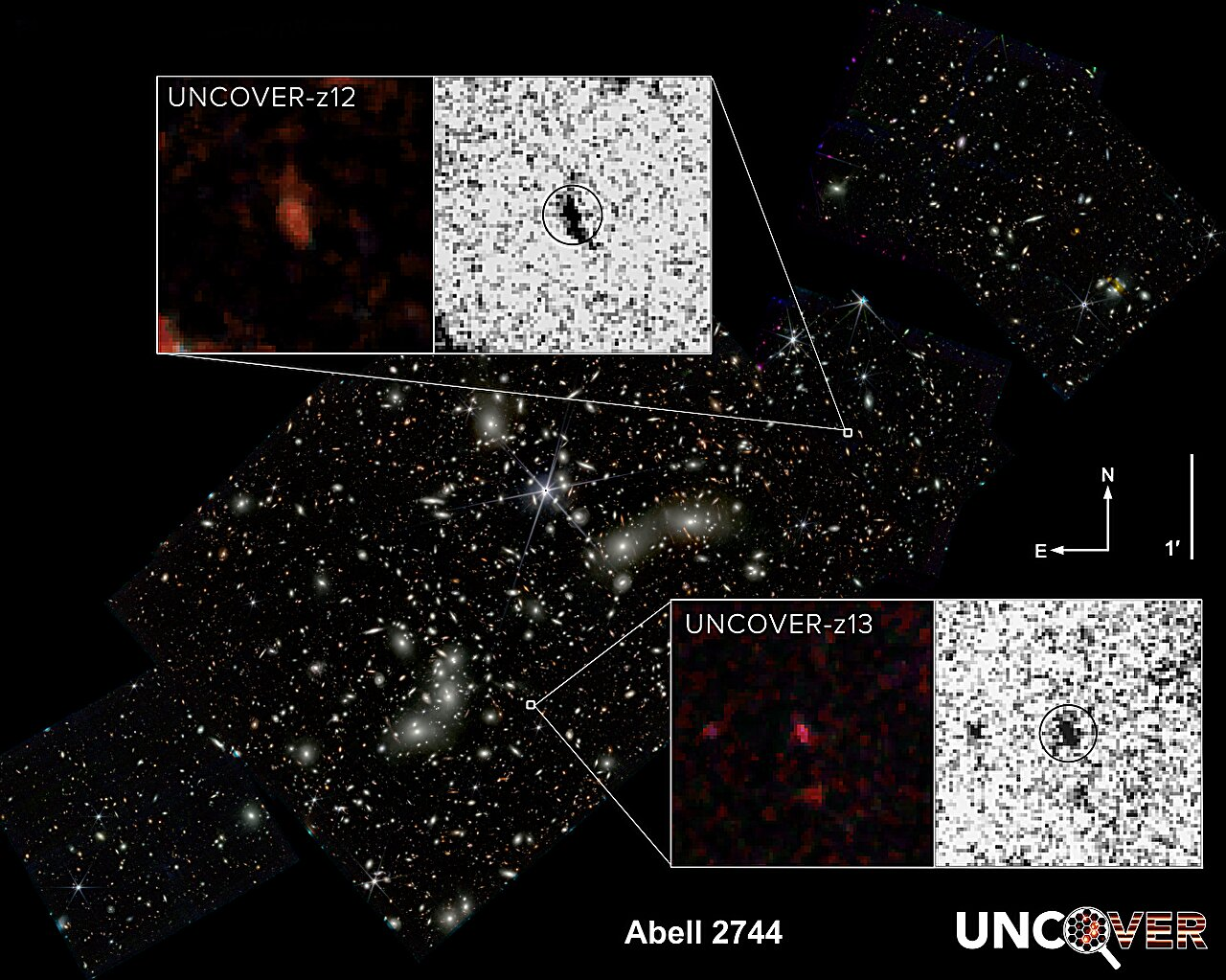

== See also ==
- List of the most distant astronomical objects
- JADES-GS-z14-0, furthest galaxy ever recorded
- JADES-GS-z13-0, former furthest galaxy ever recorded
