= PSO J172.3556+18.7734 =

Astronomical jet

Observation data (Epoch )
- Constellation: Leo
- Right ascension: 11^{h} 29^{m} 25.36^{s}
- Declination: +18° 46′ 24.3″
- Redshift: 6.82

PSO J172.3556+18.7734 is an astrophysical jet that was discovered in May 2011. It was originally thought to be a quasar by astronomers; as of March 8, 2021, it is now classified as a cosmic jet (astrophysical jet). As of 2021, it is the farthest jet discovered with a redshift of 6.82.

== See also ==
- List of the most distant astronomical objects
- List of quasars
- QSO J0313–1806
