= Capotauro =

Y-type brown dwarf in the constellation Boötes

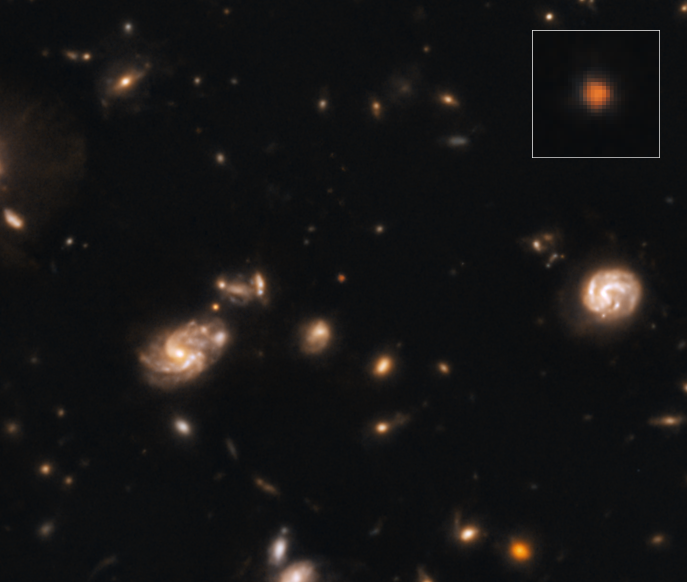
- Magnified image of CEERS U-100588 (Capotauro) as observed by the JWST; Credit: G. Capriotti, G. Gandolfi et al.

Observation data Epoch J2000 Equinox ICRS
- Constellation: Boötes
- Right ascension: 14^{h} 19^{m} 32.97^{s}
- Declination: +52° 47′ 52.11″

Characteristics
- Spectral type: Y1.0±0.5

Astrometry
Proper motion (μ)	RA: +9.4+6.3 −4.8 mas/yr Dec.: −35.6+5.1 −5.9 mas/yr
Parallax (π)	1.4±0.2 mas
Distance	2,380 ± 360 ly (730±110 pc)

Details
Radius	0.124 ± 0.016 (Note: Calculated, using the Stefan-Boltzmann law and the star's effective temperature and luminosity, with respect to the solar nominal effective temperature of 5,772 K: $$\sqrt{\biggl(\frac{5,772}{350}\biggr)^4 \cdot 10^{-6.68}} = 0.124\ R_\odot.$$) R_{☉}
Luminosity	10^{−6.68±0.11} L_{☉}
Temperature	350 K

Other designations
- CEERS ID U-100588

Capotauro is an Y-type brown dwarf detected by the James Webb Space Telescope (JWST) on the Cosmic Evolution Early Release Science (CEERS) Survey. It was thought to be an extremely distant Lyman-break galaxy with a photometric redshift (z) of 32, a dusty interloper galaxy with a redshift (z) of 6, a rogue planet, a Y2–Y3 spectral type brown dwarf or a black hole star, but in 2026 was confirmed to be an Y-type brown dwarf based on the confirmation of significant proper motion.

== History of observations ==
The research team at the University of Padua named the mystery object after a mountain in Italy: Capotauro is the ancient name of the peak now known as Corno alle Scale, located in the Apennine Mountains. Lead researcher Giovanni Gandolfi said: "Capotauro could be the farthest galaxy ever seen at a timescale that is compatible with the first stars and black holes to form in the universe". It has been compared to the hypothesised 'black hole star', which is a primordial black hole surrounded by a dense atmosphere. Other scientists have been sceptical about whether Capotauro is a galaxy however.

It is characterized by a significant absence of light in certain wavelengths and a pronounced drop in others. Its paucity of light and spectral peculiarities make it an enigmatic object, defying conventional classifications and sparking debate about whether the standard cosmological model might need adjustments, although another study suggests otherwise for galaxies up to redshift z=30.

If Capotauro were spectroscopically confirmed to have a redshift of 32, then it would have existed just 90 million years after the Big Bang. This is nearly 200 million years before the current record holder MoM-z14 and would place Capotauro closer to the very beginning of time than any structure we have yet seen.

Capotauro would also be very bright for a young galaxy. The object's apparent luminosity implies a mass near a billion suns which is difficult to reconcile with current theories. Nicha Leethochawalit from the National Astronomical Research Institute of Thailand said "To achieve such a mass, the efficiency at which the galaxy turned gas into stars would have to be close to 100 percent", whereas an efficiency of 10-20% is thought to be more usual.

A galaxy appearing only 90 million years after the Big Bang implies that current theories about how quickly structures had formed are at odds with these observations by Gandolfi and his team. However, there could be other explanations as well and the initial theory that Capotauro might be at such an extreme redshift is doubted. Other possibilities include a black hole star, a brown dwarf, a nearer dusty galaxy (or interloper) and a rogue (hostless) planet.

A work looking for brown dwarfs did find that the photometry showed excellent fits to atmospheric models of brown dwarfs. One of the models also agrees with the faint NIRSpec spectrum. Capotauro is also very similar to other brown dwarf candidates in their search. The team finds that the object is very likely an ultra-cool Y-dwarf.

In 2026, imaging observations spanning 3.5 years confirmed proper motion from the object. The presence of proper motion confirms that it is not a background, extragalactic object, but rather a much closer brown dwarf. Comparing its spectral energy distribution to atmospheric templates yields a spectral type of Y1.0±0.5, with a temperature of 350 K (77 °C; 170 °F) and a distance of 730 ± 110 parsecs (2,380 ± 360 ly).

== See also ==
- List of the most distant astronomical objects
- List of Y-dwarfs
