= UNCOVER-z12 =

Lyman-break galaxy in the constellation Sculptor

- UNCOVER-z12, as seen in November of 2023

Observation data (J2000 epoch)
- Constellation: Sculptor
- Right ascension: 00^{h} 14^{m} 03.25^{s}
- Declination: −30° 21′ 24.48″
- Redshift: 12.393
- Distance: 32.21 billion light years (estimated)

Characteristics
- Type: Lyman-break galaxy

UNCOVER-z12 is a high-redshift Lyman-break galaxy discovered by the James Webb Space Telescope (JWST) during NIRCam imaging for the JWST Ultradeep NIRSpec and NIRCam Observations before the Epoch of Reionization (UNCOVER) project in November 2023. UNCOVER-z12 is within the Abell 2744 supercluster in the constellation Sculptor. It is the 9th-most distant spectroscopically confirmed galaxy ever discovered as of 2026, and is estimated to be 32.21 giga-lightyears from Earth.

== Morphology ==
UNCOVER-z12 is a Lyman-Break galaxy. Due to the recent discovery date, not much more is known about the galaxy itself.

== Discovery ==
UNCOVER-z12 was first observed when large amounts of gravitational lensing from Abell 2744 made the galaxy visible. Abell 2744 is around 3.5 billion light-years away from the Milky Way.

The gravity of Abell 2744 warps the fabric of space-time sufficiently to magnify the light of more faraway galaxies. The James Webb Space Telescope used the gravitational lensing to discover UNCOVER-z12, and further studies of deep galaxies located within Abell 2744 are currently ongoing.

== UNCOVER-z13 ==
UNCOVER-z13 is a second, more far-away galaxy that was located on November 14, 2023, which was discovered around the same time as UNCOVER-z12. It has a redshift of 13.079, making it the 3rd most distant object ever discovered in the observable universe.

== See also ==
- List of the most distant astronomical objects
- Maisie's Galaxy, another extremely distant galaxy
- GLASS-z12, an extremely distant galaxy with a similar redshift
