= Quasi-star =

Hypothetical early-universe star with a black hole core

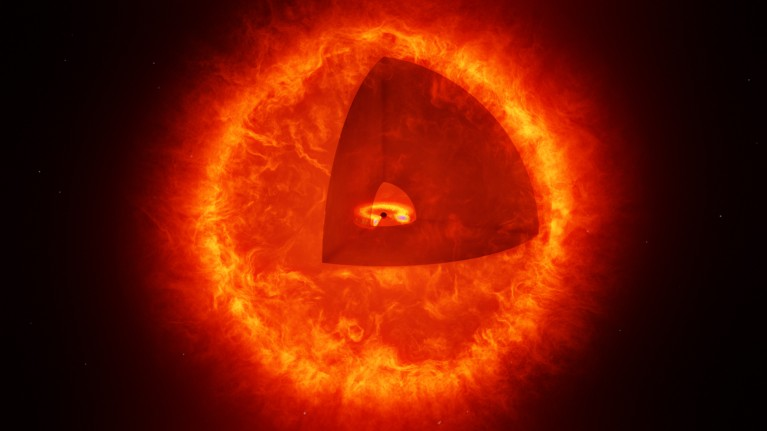
An artist's impression of a quasi-star, showing a black hole core residing in the massive photospheric envelope of the object

A quasi-star or quasistar (QS), also called a black hole star, is a hypothetical type of extremely massive and luminous star that may have existed early in the history of the universe. Unlike modern stars, which are powered by nuclear fusion in their cores, a quasi-star's energy would come from material falling into a black hole at its core. The formation of such an object would have resulted from the core of a large supermassive protostar collapsing into a stellar-mass black hole, where the outer layers of the protostar are massive enough to absorb the resulting burst of energy without being blown away or falling into the black hole, as occurs in a supernova event. As such they would resemble red giants to an external observer, but enormously scaled-up and, as they were powered by an accreting central black hole, having luminosities comparable to a Seyfert galaxy's nucleus.

Quasi-stars were first hypothesized in 2006; although a confirmed observation has not yet been made, potential sightings of these objects have been reported by the James Webb Space Telescope since its launch, with little red dots (LRDs), such as one called The Cliff and MoM-BH*-1, as possible examples and candidates. The study of quasi-stars would provide valuable insight into the early universe, galaxy formation, and the behavior of black holes, namely because they are considered as possible progenitors of the modern supermassive black holes that formed soon after the Big Bang.

== Structure ==
Although different models exist for the structure of a quasi-star, it is generally thought to consist of a spinning black hole consuming gas as fast as angular momentum losses will allow, surrounded by a star-like envelope of gas (which contains the bulk of the star's mass) held back by radiation pressure generated by the infalling gas. This overlying envelope is highly convective and supported by radiation pressure. According to recent models, it may also become adiabatic during a quasi-star's late stage, with an inner saturated-convection region forming by that time, thereby conforming to a convection-dominated accretion flow around the black hole. The quasi-star would also have a porous atmosphere around the convective envelope, where convection becomes inefficient. In a 2011 model for the structure of a super-Eddington quasi-star with masses over a million M_{☉} where it would suffer substantial mass loss due to its extreme luminosity, its strong stellar wind appears as optically thick surface and hence appears as a cooler extended pseudo-photosphere above the porous atmosphere, where the optical density of the wind drops to near zero, typically measured at a particular Rosseland opacity value such as 2/3. Photon-tired winds – stellar winds intense enough that the wind luminosity is equivalent to the total available stellar luminosity – appear between both.

A thin pre-galactic disk also surrounds the quasi-star, in which the star feeds it at rates from 2×10^{−3} to a few of tens of M_{☉} per year. The black hole within the core would rapidly accrete the surrounding gas from the envelope through a convectively or advectively dominated thick accretion disk or a quasi-spherical accretion, with at least 10^{−4} to several M_{☉} per year, possibly up to a highly super-Eddington accretion rate. The accretion rate onto the black hole energetically sustains the gaseous envelope, but its limit is often set by the Eddington limit of the entire object, which is initially much larger than that of the black hole alone. The excess energy is carried away by convection. Analogous to active galactic nuclei and gamma-ray bursts, the rotation of the quasi-star alongside the poloidal magnetic fields in the black hole or disk magnetosphere (or both) may mediate the production of a relativistic jet, and they may be transported from the outer regions to the center only thanks to thick accretion flows. This would produce gamma rays in the reconfinement shocks formed within one-hundredth to one times the quasi-star's radius.

Hawking stars are a theoretical type of star proposed by Stephen Hawking. They contain a primordial black hole and were also formed in the early universe. They differ from black hole stars in that the black hole is microscopic.

== Formation and properties ==
Size comparison of a hypothetical quasi-star to some of the largest known stars.

Formation of quasi-stars could only happen early in the development of the universe before hydrogen and helium were contaminated by heavier elements; thus, they may have been very massive Population III stars. A quasi-star would have resulted from the core of a protostar of at least 1,000 solar masses (2.0×10^{33} kg) collapsing into a black hole, where the outer layers of the protostar are massive enough to absorb the resulting supernova without being blown away. Dark matter halos, drawing in enormous amounts of gas via gravity, will typically produce supermassive stars but, if high accretion rates can be maintained, a quasi-star may form instead. In either case, quasi-stars would have ballooned to enormous sizes, proportional to $M_*^{1/2}$ and around 8,200 solar radii (38 AU) or 40,700 solar radii (189 AU) at 1000 M_{☉} dwarfing the largest known modern stars and approaching or exceeding the Solar System in size. They are predicted to have had surface temperatures higher than 4,000 K (3,730 °C). In the limit where the black hole is a small fraction of the overall mass, surface temperature scales as $M_\text{BH}^{-2/5} M_*^{7/20}$. At these temperatures, each one would be about as luminous as a small galaxy.

Once the black hole had formed at the core of a new quasi-star, it would continue generating a large amount of radiant energy from the infall of stellar material. This constant outflow of energy would counteract the force of gravity, creating an equilibrium similar to Hayashi track stars. Quasi-stars would have had a short maximum lifespan, approximately 7 to 10 million years, during which the core black hole would have grown to about 1,000–10,000 solar masses (2×10^{33}–2×10^{34} kg).

As a quasi-star cooled over time, its outer envelope would become transparent, until further cooling to a limiting temperature of 4,000 K (3,730 °C). This would mark the end of the quasi-star's life since there is no hydrostatic equilibrium at or below this limiting temperature. It would then dissipate without a supernova, leaving behind an intermediate-mass black hole. These intermediate-mass black holes are theorized as the progenitors of modern supermassive black holes, and would help explain how supermassive black holes formed so early in the history of the universe.

== Candidates ==
=== MoM-BH*-1 ===
Rohan Naidu et al. have claimed that the object MoM-BH*-1, formed 660 million years after the Big Bang and observed by the James Webb Space Telescope, is a black hole star. The light produced by the object is almost entirely at the red end of the spectrum, an effect attributed to light scattering from gas. The model proposed for MoM-BH*-1 may also explain other little red dots detected by the telescope. At least 300 little red dots have been identified in Ultra Deep surveys, all of which may be quasi-stars.

== See also ==
- Blitzar – Hypothetical type of neutron star
- Capotauro – Y-type brown dwarf in the constellation Boötes, originally believed to be a quasi-star
- Direct collapse black hole – High-mass black hole seeds
- Neutron star – Collapsed core of a massive star
- Quark star – Compact exotic star which forms matter consisting mostly of quarks
- Quasar – Active galactic nucleus (AGN) containing a supermassive black hole
- Thorne–Żytkow object – Hypothetical hybrid star type
