= Little Red Dots =

Poorly understood class of astronomical objects

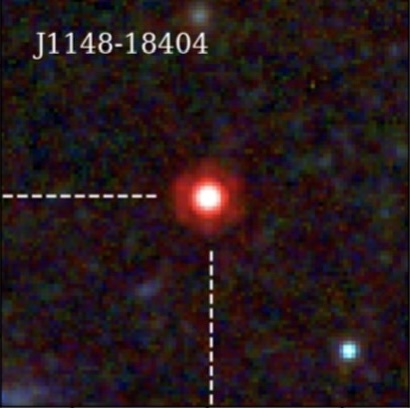
The little red dot J1148-18404 (center) in false color, located about 12.6 billion light-years away in the constellation Ursa Major.

Unsolved problem in astronomy
What is the nature of Little Red Dots?
More unsolved problems in astronomy

Little red dots (LRDs) are a class of small, red-tinted astronomical objects with unexpected characteristics observed using the James Webb Space Telescope (JWST). They appear to have existed between 0.6 and 1.6 billion years after the Big Bang (13.2 to 12.2 billion years ago), with a majority found around 600 million years post-Big Bang. As of 2025, over 300 little red dots have been observed.

Various efforts to explain these observations rely on analogies to existing stars or on models. The original reports identified LRDs as a type of early active galactic nucleus (AGN) containing a supermassive black hole. However, while this explains their age and appearance, they do not have the same characteristics as known AGNs. For example, they do not appear to emit X-rays, have a flattened rather than steeply rising infrared spectrum, and display very little variability between themselves. Other theories proposed include that LRDs are supermassive stars, luminous precursors to supermassive black holes, or that they are quasi-stars (black hole stars).

== Models ==
Several models have been proposed to explain the observed properties of little red dots. The shape of the ultraviolet spectrum can be explained by the scattered AGN light or by the gray dust extinction law. The spectral energy distribution (SED) for many LRDs can be modeled using clumps of massive, hot OB stars or active galactic nuclei within dense dusty regions which absorb and remit the energy of the stars.

=== As active galactic nuclei ===
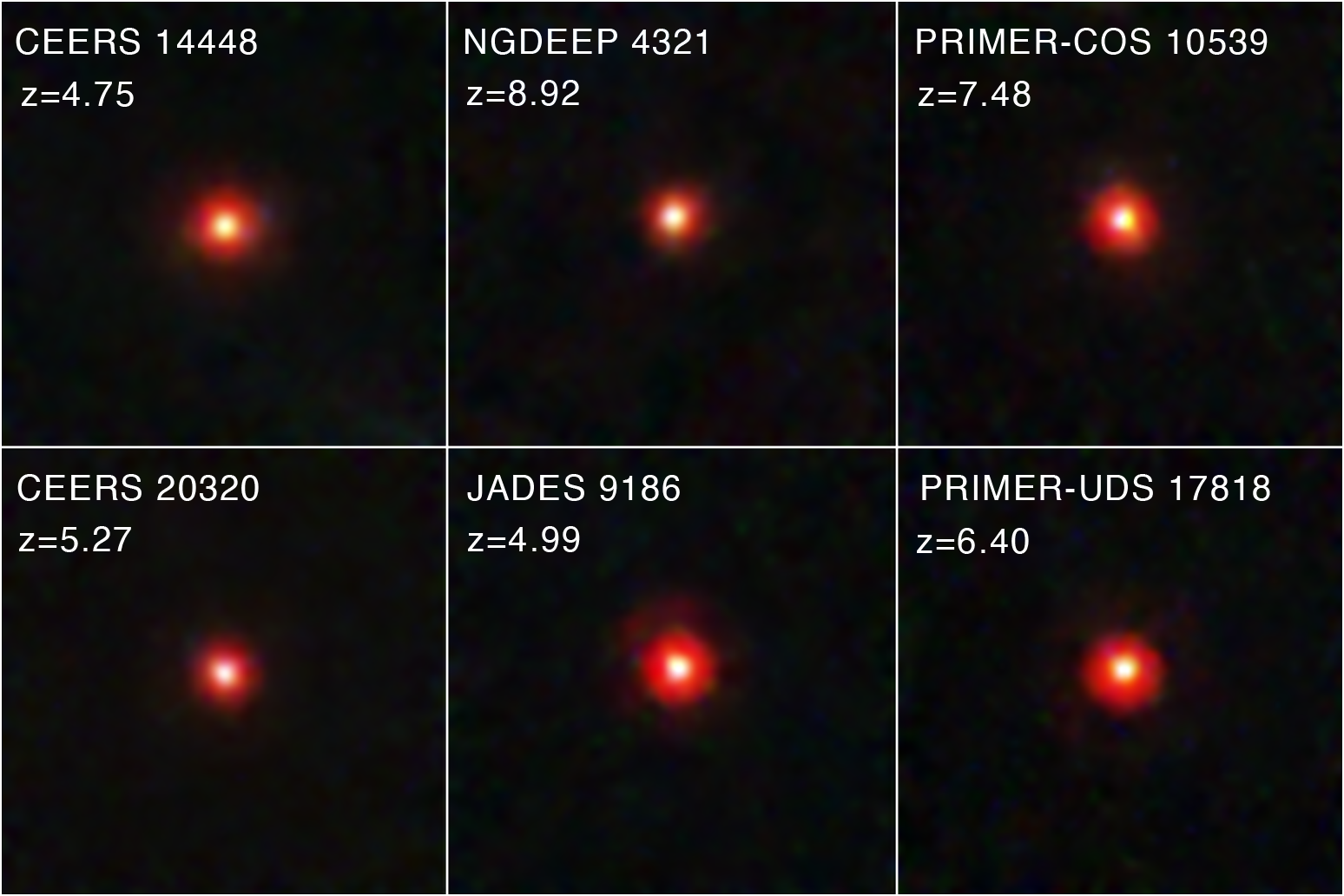
False-color stamps of 6 Little Red Dots with redshift given

Little red dots were first reported as abundant, faint active galactic nuclei (AGN) found by seeking broad Balmer line emitters. Subsequent surveys confirmed their abundance and their relative faint UV spectrum. Active galactic nuclei are defined as small regions in the centers of galaxies that emit copious amounts of energy in the form of bright jets and winds. One property of LRDs explained by the AGN theory is the red color of the galaxies themselves. Astrophysicists have determined that the distinct color can be attributed to the massive amounts of gas, dust, and electromagnetic energy that surrounds the AGN and supermassive black hole. This region is also known as the accretion disk.

A team using the Webb telescope targeted LRDs in the 'Red Unknowns: Bright Infrared Extragalactic Survey', observing rapid gas orbits of roughly 900 km/s—a strong indicator of black hole accretion.

More direct evidence for the black-hole interpretation came in 2026 from Abell 2744-QSO1. Spatially resolved observations showed a rotation curve inconsistent with a nuclear star cluster but consistent with Keplerian rotation around a point mass of approximately 50 million solar masses. The dynamical mass agreed with previous virial black-hole mass estimates, demonstrating that such estimates are applicable to this prototypical LRD.

On the other hand, LRDs also exhibit properties that are difficult to explain within the AGN scenario. For example, they have a flat infrared spectrum, and little X-ray emission has been detected. LRDs also show very weak time variability, while high variability is often seen in AGN observation.

=== As supermassive population III stars ===
Another theory is that the little red dots are supermassive stars, luminous precursors to supermassive black holes. These non-metallic primordial stars—also known as population III stars— contain perhaps a million times the Sun's mass. Theoretical modelling of such stars closely match the spectrum features and luminosity of LRDs, including the presence of a "strong, broad Hβ emission line alongside other Balmer lines in absorption", and in particular the photosphere of such a star would cause the V-shaped Balmer break seen in LRDs.

=== As black hole stars ===
Another theory proposes that LRDs are quasi-stars or similar objects, consisting of a black hole surrounded by a gaseous envelope. Models suggest that the red color and spectrum of LRD MoM-BH*-1 is a result of light scattering from dense ionized gas surrounding a black hole.

=== Galaxies around direct-collapse black holes ===
Another model claims that the spectral properties match a direct collapse black hole and the galaxy surrounding it. The black hole attracted the material of the galaxy, including a dense cluster of stars within 150 parsecs (490 ly). The dense central cluster traps the X-ray emission from the accretion onto the black hole and the secondary emission gives the LRD spectrum in this model.

== Observed properties ==
Research has shown that LRDs do not commonly exist at lower redshifts. One possible reason for this observation is "inside-out growth". When a galaxy evolves and expands outward from its nucleus at lower redshifts, a decreasing amount of gas is deposited near the accreting black hole. Thus, the black hole sheds its outer gas layers, becomes bluer, and is no longer categorized as an LRD.

Most are extremely compact, averaging around 2% of the radius of the Milky Way. A typical LRD has a radius no greater than 500 light years, though many have radii smaller than 150 light years.

From a sample of 99 little red dots analyzed for morphology, 69 were predominantly compact without extended components, with the other 30 with more complex morphologies. Of these complex galaxies, 50% showed multiple associated components, and the rest showed highly asymmetric structures, with indications of a composite nature. It is hypothesized from this analysis that LRDs may be a product of galaxy interactions and mergers, with potential evidence to suggest early stages of galaxy and black hole growth. These suspected young black holes are among the smallest recorded, at 10^{5} – 10^{7} solar masses.

Likely local analogues of LRDs were discovered in a sample of green pea galaxies (GP). These are broad-line AGN-hosting green peas (BLGP) with V-shaped rest-frame UV-to-optical SED. Seven such V-shaped BLGPs were identified from a sample size of 2,190. These V-shaped BLGPs host over-massive black holes.

=== RUBIES ===
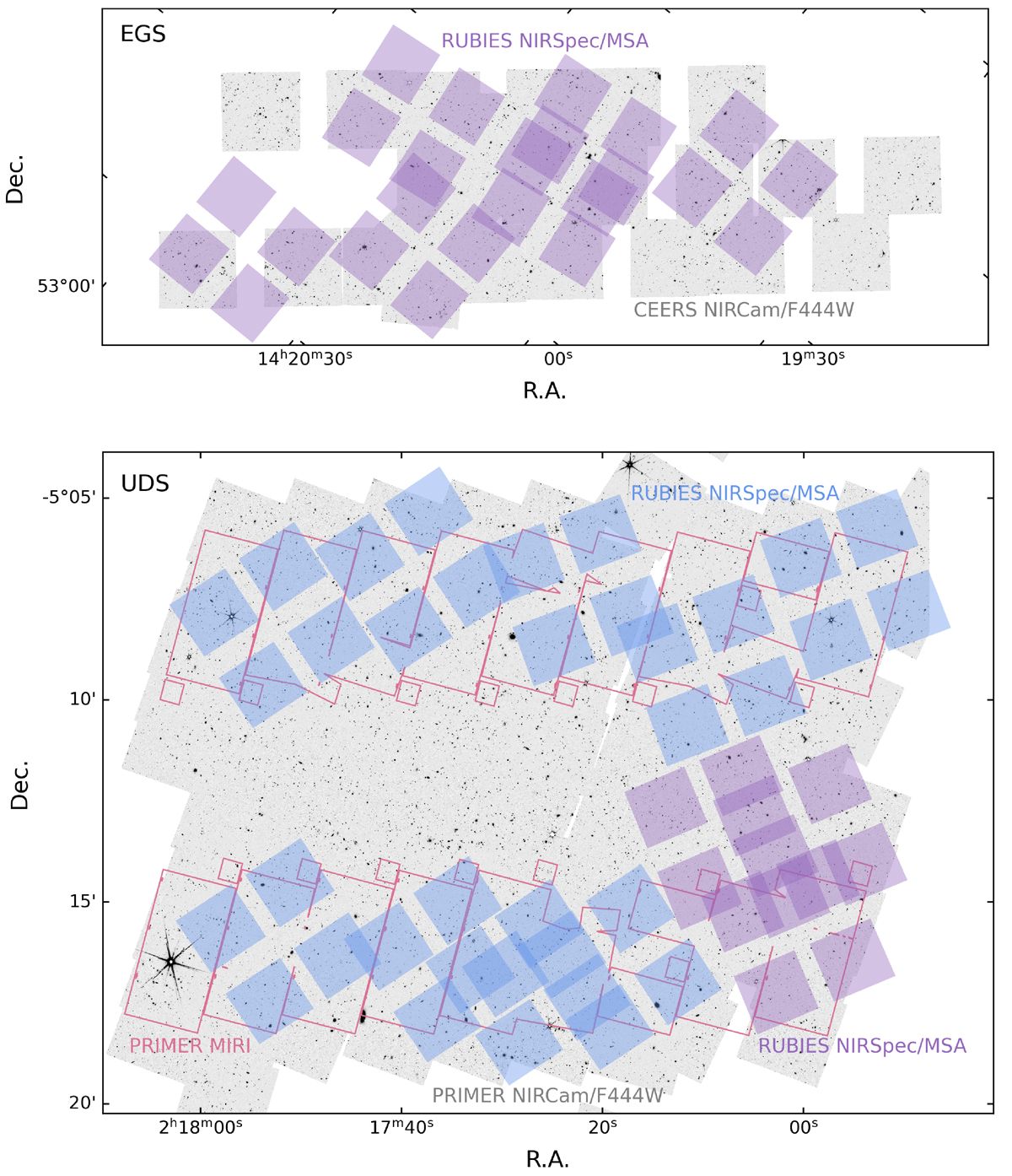
RUBIES footprint of 18 NIRSpec/MSA pointings in the UDS and EGS fields. Purple pointings correspond to the first half of observations in January to March 2024. Background images show the NIRCam F444W image mosaics, primarily constructed from public imaging of the CEERS and PRIMER surveys. The outline of the PRIMER MIRI imaging footprint for the UDS is shown in pink.

RUBIES, the "Red Unknowns: Bright Infrared Extragalactic Survey", is a JWST program led by Anna de Graaff and Gabriel Brammer that observed ~300 "very red sources" in the Ultra Deep Survey (UDS) and Extended Groth Strip (EGS) fields. Research conducted in association with RUBIES program has found that sources of a selected group (2 < z < 5) have a majority of massive quiescent galaxies, which is 10 times the original estimated value. The program has also found that observed LRDs have much lower levels of hot and cold gas than models would suggest, pointing away from the possibilities of AGNs or star-forming galaxies, although this is still debated.

== Notable LRDs ==
=== The Cliff (RUBIES-UDS-154183) ===
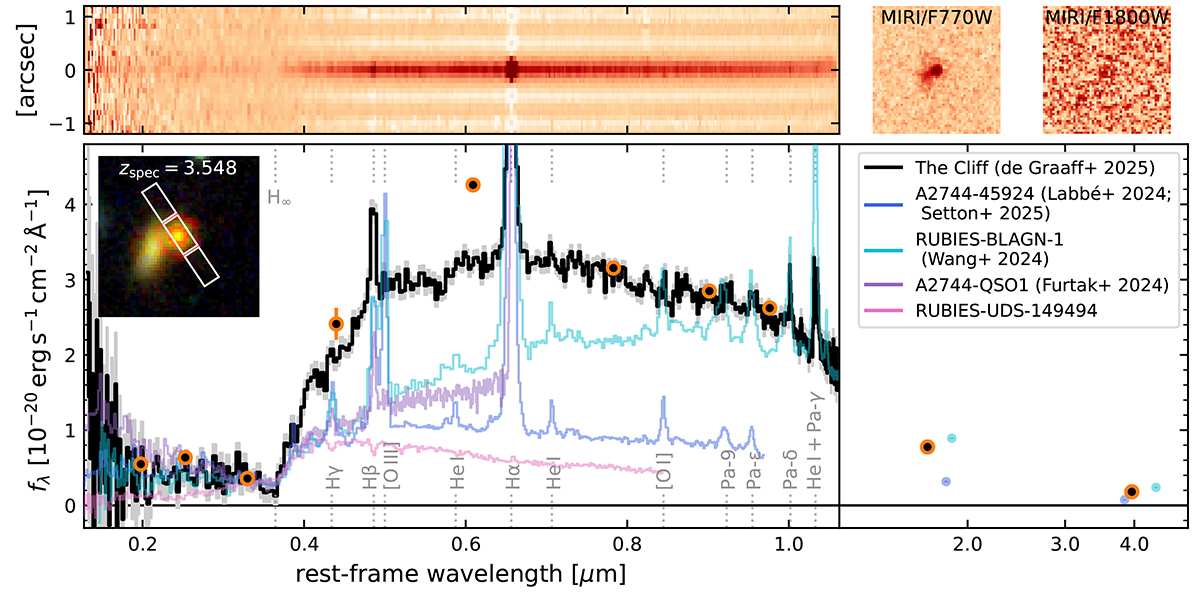
NIRSpec/PRISM spectrum of The Cliff. The orange points show NIRCam and MIRI photometry.

The Cliff is an LRD with a prominent Balmer break, discovered via JWST's RUBIES program. Detailed spectroscopic observations suggest that The Cliff might be a black hole star.

=== CAPERS-LRD-z9 ===
CAPERS-LRD-z9 is a little red dot confirmed to be a broad-line active galactic nucleus (BLAGN) with the redshift z = 9.288. It is the highest redshift AGN known. CAPERS-LRD-z9 exhibits a prominent Balmer break and "provides strong evidence in support of the 'dense-gas-enshrouded AGN'" explanation. These unusual Balmer jumps are notable properties of LRDs, causing difficulties in observations and spectroscopic analysis. Some LRDs exhibit a symmetrical density distribution of electron scattering, thus a gaseous envelope absorbing nebular spectra is a credible possibility.

=== A2744–45924 ===
The LRD A2744–45924 is located in the Abell 2744 field, and is the most optically luminous LRD found by JWST.

=== RUBIES-BLAGN-1 ===
RUBIES-BLAGN-1 is an LRD which is "an unusually bright LRD (zspec = 3.1) observed as part of the RUBIES program. This LRD exhibits broad emission lines (FWHM ~ 4000 km s^{−1}), a blue UV continuum, a clear Balmer break, and a red continuum sampled out to rest-frame 4 μm with MIRI."

=== J1007_AGN ===
The LRD J1007_AGN has a redshift z = 7.3, and is "embedded in an overdensity of eight nearby galaxies".

=== Abell 2744-QSO1 ===
JWST NIRCam image of Abell 2744-QSO1. The object appears three times (QSO1A, QSO1B and QSO1C) due to gravitational lensing by the galaxy cluster Abell 2744.

Abell 2744-QSO1 is a strongly lensed little red dot at a redshift of z = 7.04. It was described as a "naked" black hole, because very few stars are in its vicinity. Observations of its gas kinematics yielded a direct dynamical measurement of its central black hole, with the observed rotation curve consistent with Keplerian motion around a point mass of approximately 50 million solar masses. The measurement agreed with earlier virial black-hole mass estimates. The inferred ratio of black-hole mass to stellar mass was greater than two, inconsistent with a substantial stellar host galaxy. The proposed alternative is a massive black-hole seed observed during an early phase of accretion.

=== MoM-BH*-1 ===
MoM-BH*-1 is a prominent LRD described as "a higher-redshift analogue of The Cliff". MoM-BH*-1 outshines the galaxy it hosts and models suggest its red color derives from light emitted as gas falls into a black hole scattering off surrounding gas on the way to telescopes. A team of astronomers led by Rohan P. Naidu has suggested light from MoM-BH*-1 could be explained in terms of an "enshrouded black hole".
