= MoM-BH*-1 =

Astronomical object in the constellation of Cetus

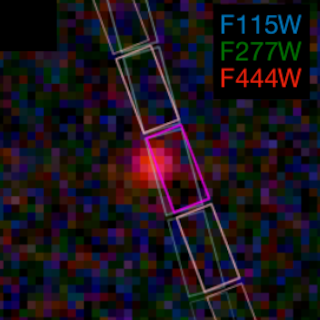
- Image of MoM-BH*-1 taken by the JWST.
- Object type: Little red dot

Observation data (Epoch J2000.0)
- Constellation: Cetus
- Right ascension: 02^{h} 17^{m} 35.40^{s}
- Declination: −05° 08′ 06.42″
- Redshift: 7.7569+0.0013 −0.0012
- Distance: 13.14 billion light years (light travel distance)

MoM-BH*-1 is an astronomical object classified as a little red dot, a class of astronomical objects of reddish colouration, located in the constellation of Cetus. In 2026, it was proposed that MoM-BH*-1 is a black hole star (also known as a quasi-star), composed of a central black hole surrounded by a large and dense gas cloud, the first object to be identified as such.

== Discovery ==
The object was found during the "Mirage or Miracle" (MoM) survey conducted with the James Webb Space Telescope (JWST). MoM-BH*-1 was imaged by JWST in three surveys, the first in the PRIMER survey, using the Mid-Infrared Instrument (MIRI) on 5 and 16 January 2023 and NIRCam on 7 and 9 August 2023, the second by the EXCELS survey on 19 December 2023, and by the MoM survey on 15 December 2024. It was named after the survey, MoM, and an abbreviation of "black hole star – one".

=== Black hole star candidate ===
In 2026, a research team led by Rohan P. Naidu, a University of Hawaiʻi (Note: The research on MoM-BH*-1 was conducted while Naidu was at the MIT Kavli Institute, but he is now at the University of Hawaiʻi.) astronomer, identified MoM-BH*-1 as an "enshrouded black hole" of around 10^{6.3} M_{☉}. The similarity of the object with other little red dots suggests that they may be black hole stars as well.

== Location ==
Location of MoM-BH*-1 (circled) within the constellation Cetus

The object, at billions of light years from Earth, is thought to have formed 660 million years after the Big Bang. Its host galaxy is a low-mass dwarf galaxy, "perhaps" metal-poor, with a mass of less than 10^{8.5} M_{☉}. According to Naidu et al. (2026), "[r]adiation from the black hole seems to dominate almost all observed light, leaving limited room for contribution from its host galaxy." Naidu described the discovery as "one in a billion!"
