= Abell 2744 =

Galaxy cluster in the constellation Sculptor

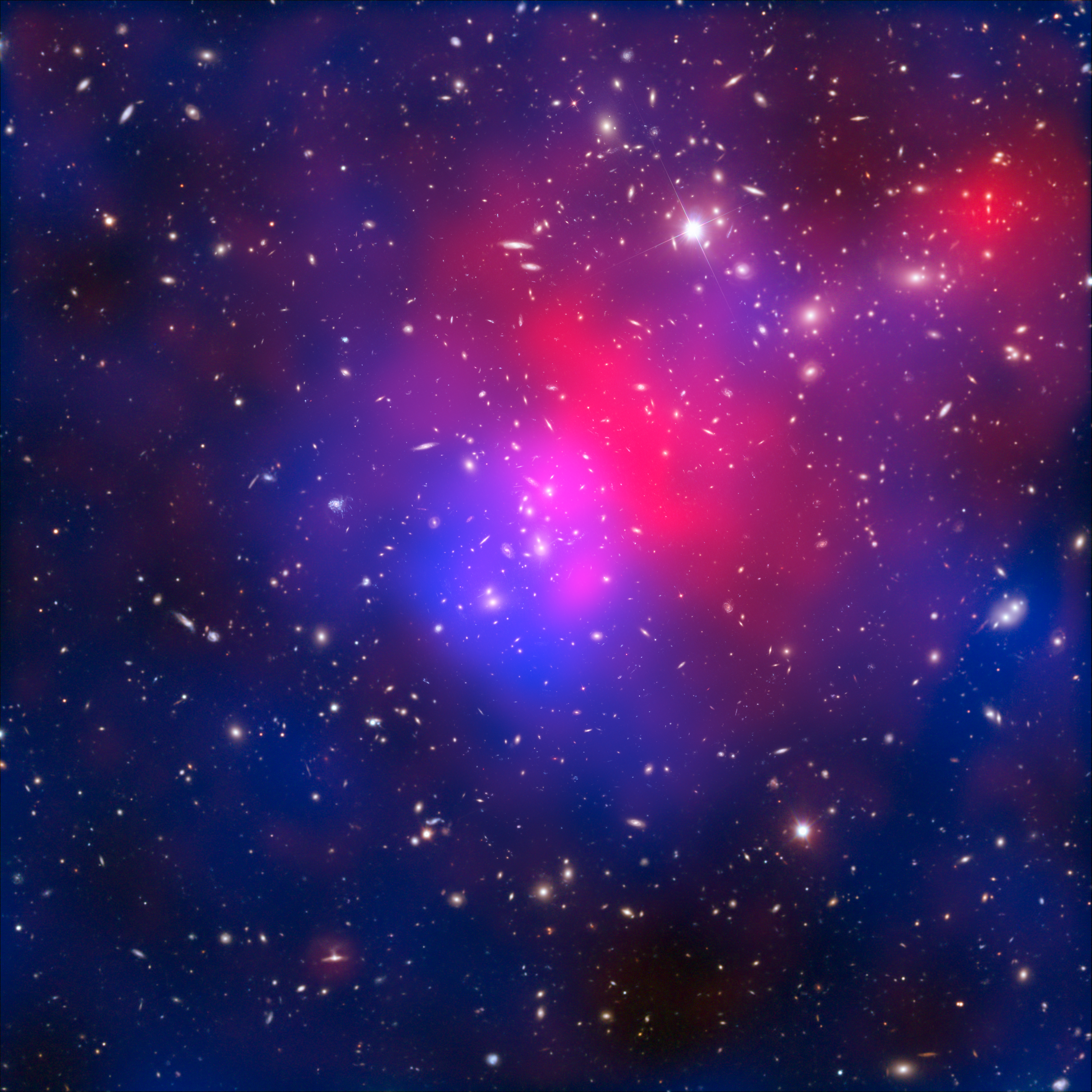
- Abell 2744, nicknamed Pandora's Cluster. The galaxies in the cluster make up less than five percent of its mass. The gas (around 20 percent) is so hot that it shines only in X-rays (coloured red in this image). The distribution of invisible dark matter (making up around 75 percent of the cluster's mass) is coloured here in blue.

Observation data (Epoch J2000)
- Constellation: Sculptor
- Right ascension: 00^{h} 14^{m} 19.51^{s}
- Declination: −30° 23′ 19.18″
- Richness class: 3
- Bautz–Morgan classification: III
- Redshift: 0.30800
- Distance: 1,221 Mpc (3,982 Mly) h^{−1}_{0.705}
- X-ray flux: (5.805 ± 4.7%)×10^{−13} erg s^{−1} cm^{−2} (0.1–2.4 keV)

Other designations
- Pandora's Cluster

Abell 2744, nicknamed Pandora's Cluster, is a giant galaxy cluster resulting from the simultaneous pile-up of at least four separate, smaller galaxy clusters that took place over a span of 350 million years, and is located approximately 4 billion light years from Earth. The galaxies in the cluster make up less than five percent of its mass. The gas (around 20 percent) is so hot that it shines only in X-rays. Dark matter makes up around 75 percent of the cluster's mass.

This cluster also shows a radio halo along with several other Abell clusters. It has a strong central halo, along with an extended tail, which could either be relic radiation, or an extension of the central halo.

Renato Dupke, a member of the team that discovered the Cluster, explained the origin of the name in an interview: "We nicknamed it ‘Pandora's Cluster’ because so many different and strange phenomena were unleashed by the collision."

== Structure ==
Abell 2744 is a highly dynamic and massive galaxy cluster, with gravitational lensing analyses and X-ray imaging identifying eight massive substructures in an ongoing merger between North and South subclusters, with a minor interloper falling inward from the Northwest. The major North-South merger is seen head-on, mostly out of the plane of the sky, with the southern subcluster in front of the northern subcluster.

The number of massive substructures is unusually high for galaxy clusters, and indicates the cluster is undergoing a period of intense change in its formation. Its structure and features could give insights about how galaxies aggregate into clusters, the latest stage in ΛCDM cosmology.

As an example, a 2025 analysis searching for starburst galaxies using the emission spectrum of polycyclic aromatic hydrocarbons (PAH), compounds which are associated with high rates of star formation, found that almost all the star-forming galaxies in the cluster were in low-density areas on the outer edges of the cluster, suggesting star-forming galaxies are quenched as they fall into a cluster and ram pressure strips them of gas and dust.

== Deep-field observations ==
Merging galaxy clusters are some of the strongest gravitational lenses in the universe, magnifying the light of distant objects from up to 12 billion light years ago, when the first stars and galaxies were forming.

As one such merging cluster, many deep field images have been taken of Abell 2744 in an effort to use the lensing effect to discover extremely distant and old astronomical objects. These observations include projects like UNCOVER on the James Webb Space Telescope, Hubble Frontier Fields on the Hubble Space Telescope, and X-ray imaging of the cluster by the Chandra X-Ray Observatory. Notable discoveries in the cluster's region of the sky include the distant quasar UHZ1, the little red dot and active galactic nucleus Abell 2744-QSO1, and the distant galaxies UNCOVER-z12 and UNCOVER-z13.

== Gallery ==
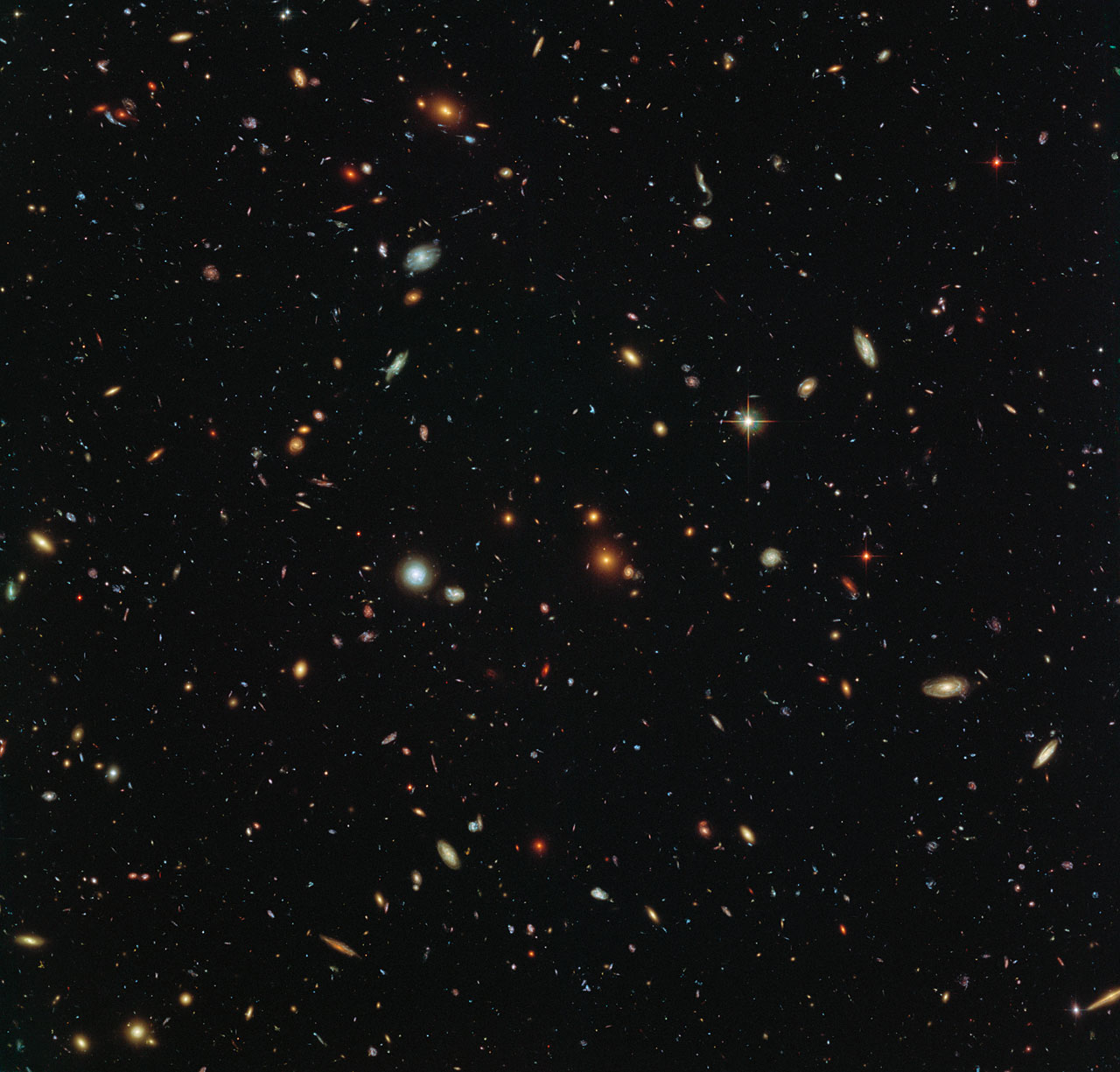
Abell 2744 parallel field observed as part of the Frontier Fields programme.

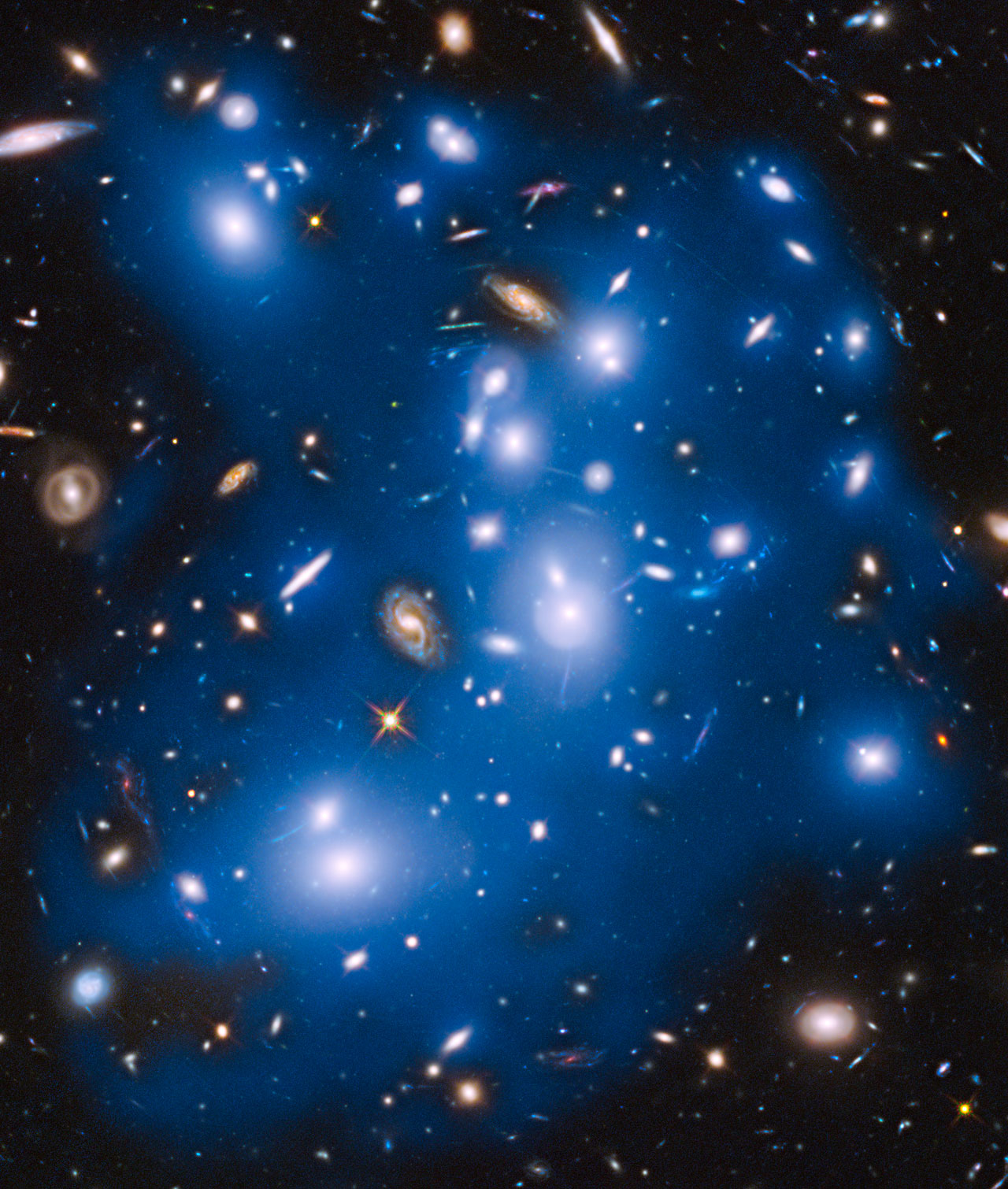
Abell 2744 intracluster light artificially colored in blue. This light come from galaxies that were torn apart long ago by the cluster's gravitational forces.

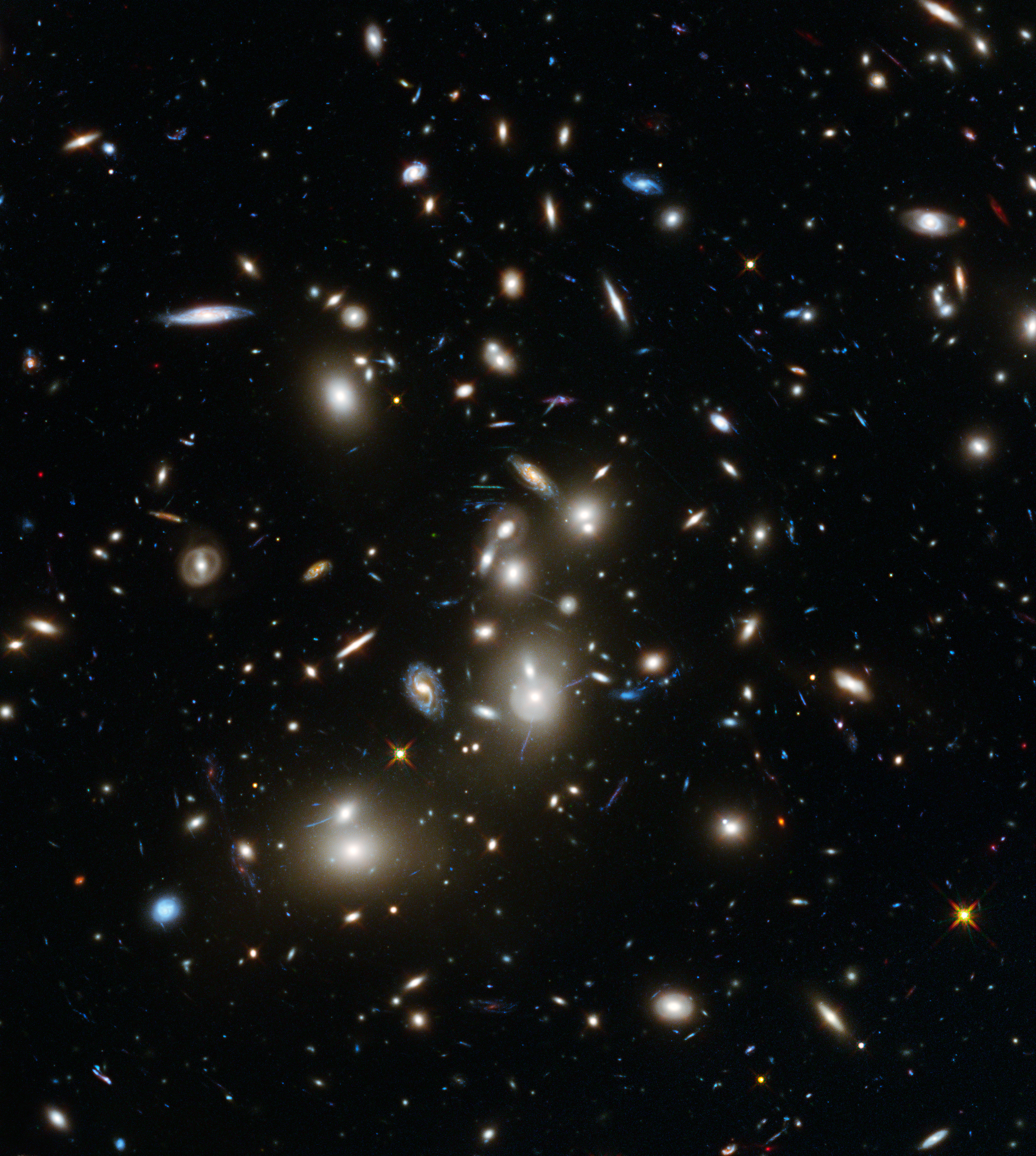
Abell 2744 galaxy cluster – Hubble Frontier Fields view (7 January 2014).

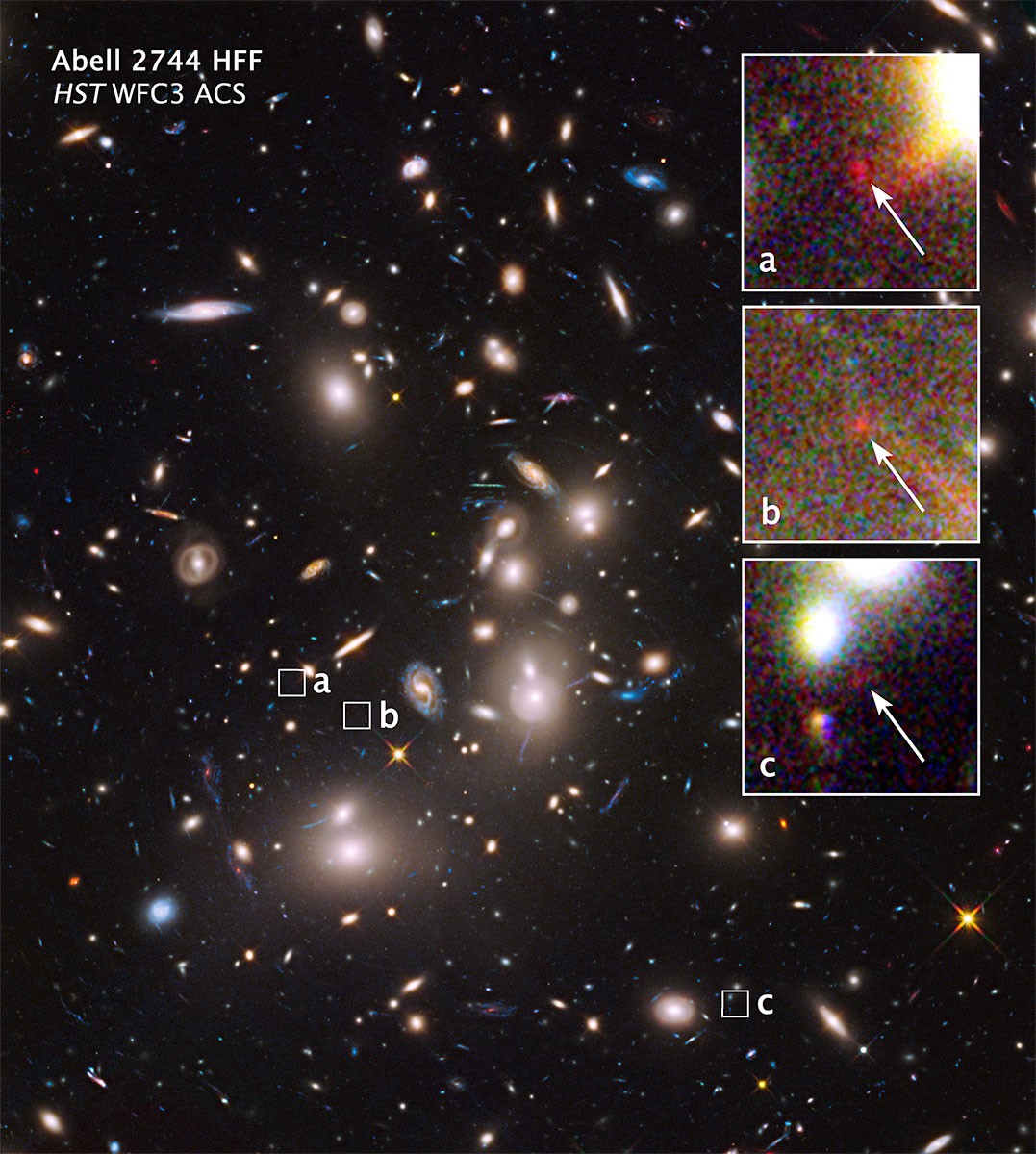
Abell 2744 galaxy cluster – extremely distant galaxies revealed by gravitational lensing (16 October 2014).

Pandora's Cluster observed by James Webb Space Telescope's NIRCam as part of UNCOVER program (15 February 2023).

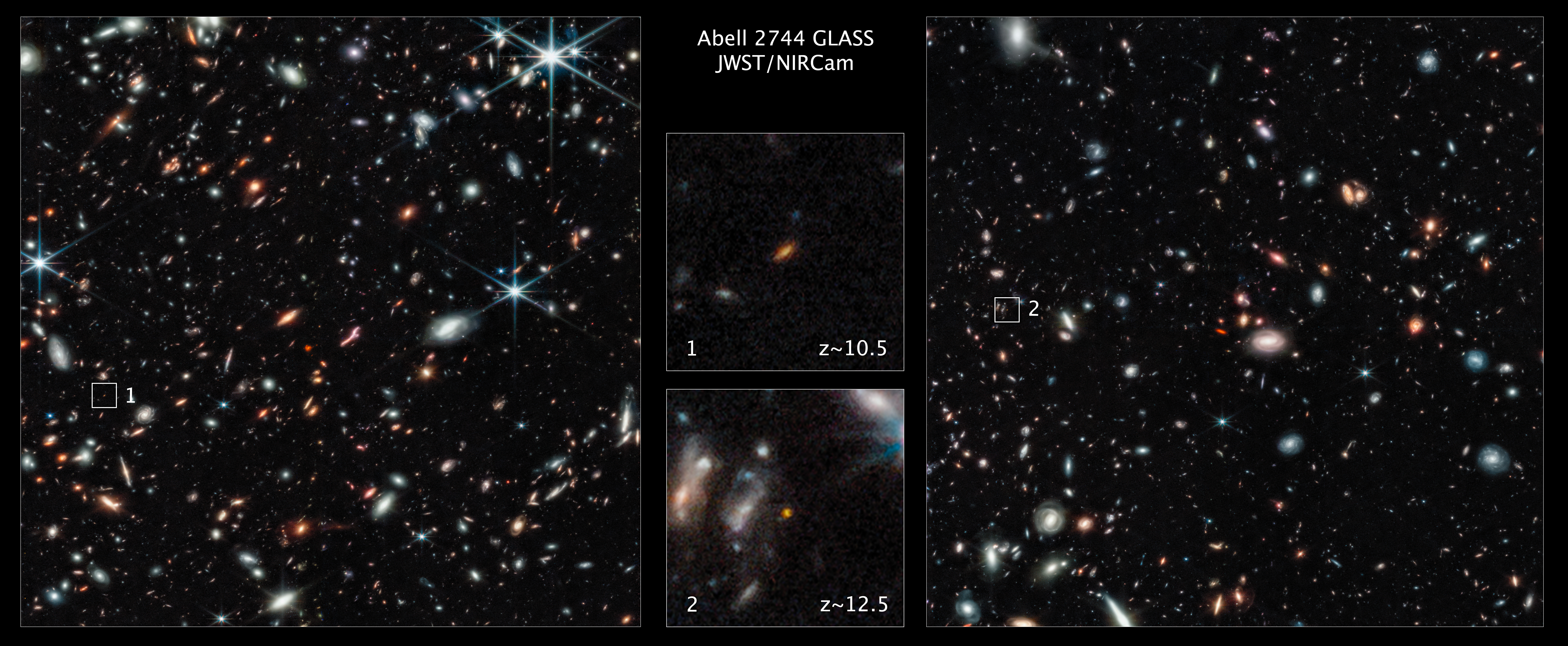
The James Webb Space Telescope's infrared vision explores behind Pandora's Cluster.

== See also ==
- Abell 370
- Abell catalogue
- List of Abell clusters
- Abell 2744-QSO1
- X-ray astronomy
