= UHZ1 =

Background galaxy containing a quasar

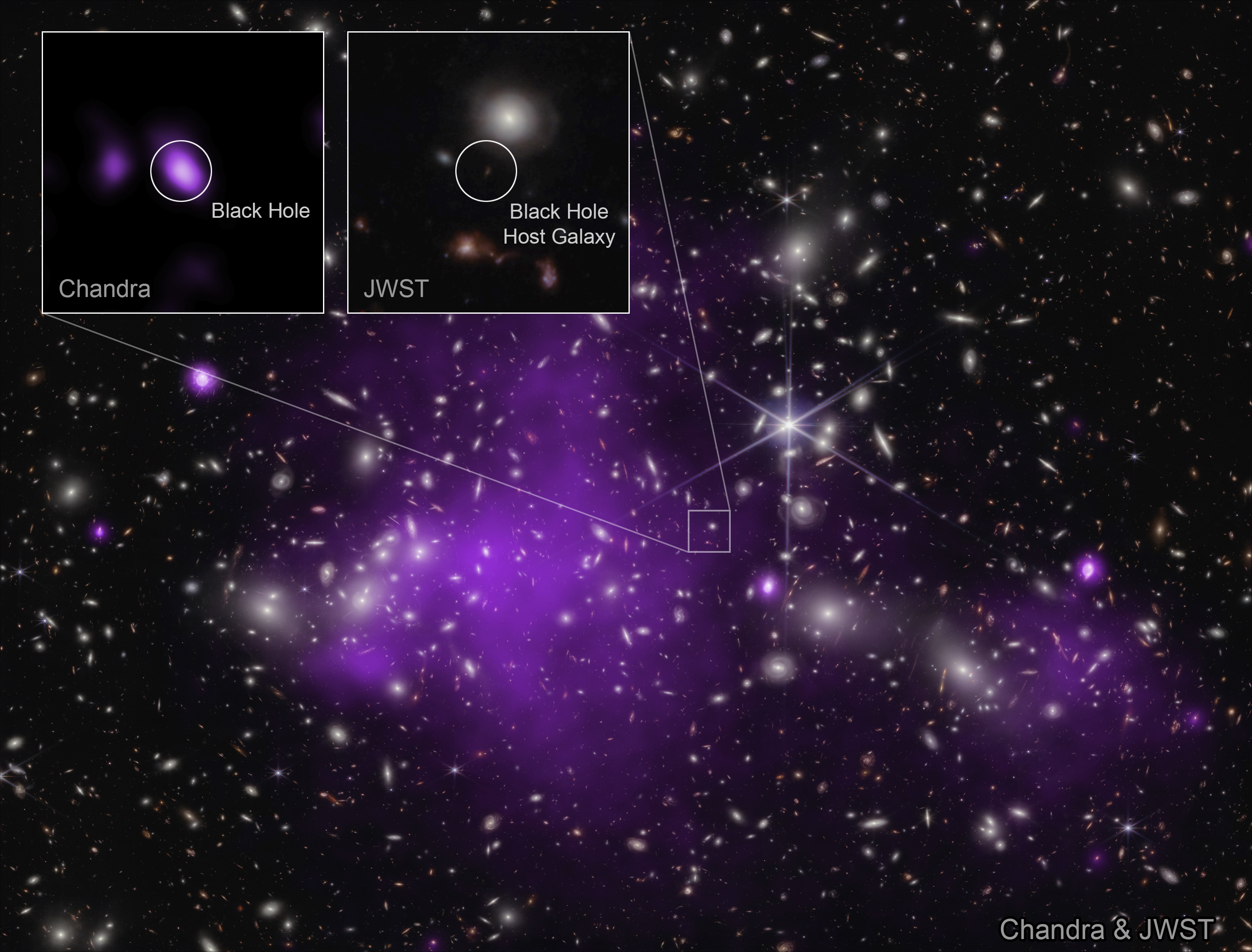

Observation data (J2000 epoch)
- Constellation: Sculptor
- Right ascension: 00^{h} 14^{m} 16.096^{s}
- Declination: −30° 22′ 40.285″
- Redshift: 10.1
- Distance: 13.2 Gly (4.047 Gpc) (light travel distance); 31.7 Gly (9.719 Gpc) (comoving distance)

Characteristics
- Size: 21,000 ly (in diameter)

UHZ1 is a background galaxy containing a quasar. At a redshift of approximately 10.1, UHZ1 is at a distance of 13.2 billion light-years, seen when our universe was about 3 percent of its current age. This redshift made it the most distant, and therefore earliest known quasar in the observable universe as of 2023. To detect this object, astronomers working at the Chandra X-ray Observatory used the Abell 2744's cluster mass as a gravitational lens in order to magnify distant objects directly behind it. At the time of discovery, it exceeded the distance record of QSO J0313−1806.

The discovery of this object has led astronomers to suggest the seeds of the first quasars may have been direct-collapse black holes, from the collapse of supermassive primordial masses of matter at the beginning of our universe.

== Impact on astronomical research ==
The Chandra-JWST discovery of a quasar with a redshift of ≈ 10.1 at the center of UHZ1 reveals that accreting supermassive black holes (SMBHs) already existed at about 470 million years after the Big Bang. The detection of early black holes as they transition from "seeds" to supermassive black holes (BHs) provides good sources at high redshift, facilitating the testing on seeding and growth models for BHs. One of the open questions about the formation of supermassive BHs is whether they originate from stellar-mass black holes, remnants from the death of massive stars or whether there are mechanisms that operate to form heavier initial seeds to begin its formation. UHZ1's data shows it requires either continuous growth exceeding the Eddington limit for >200 Myr, or a massive seed. Data collected provides a clue to the seeding mechanism and supports it.

== UHZ1 as candidate Overmassive Black Hole Galaxy ==
The Chandra X-ray source detected in UHZ1 is Compton-thick. (Note: The quasar's X-ray emission comes from a hot atmosphere of gas called the corona, which surrounds the accretion disk. As X-ray photons leave the corona in high velocity, they might be absorbed by the surrounding torus of neutral hydrogen and dust surrounding the corona. If most of the X-ray photons are absorbed, the phenomenon is called "Compton-thick".) It has a bolometric luminosity of L_{bol} ~ 5×10^{45} erg s^{−1}, corresponding to an estimated BH mass of ~ 4×10^{7} M_{☉}.

The data collected from UHZ1 and its quasar are in agreement with prior theoretical predictions by astronomers for a unique class of transient, high-redshift objects known as Overmassive (or Outsize) Black Hole Galaxies (OBGs). OBGs are heavy initial black hole seeds that likely formed from the direct collapse of gas clouds. Due to the agreement between the multi-wavelength properties of UHZ1 and the theoretical model template predictions, some astronomers suggest UHZ1 is the first detected OBG candidate.

== Footnotes ==
Records
Preceded by QSO J0313-1806	Most distant known quasar 2023 –	Succeeded by —
