= QSO J0313−1806 =

Old and distant quasar

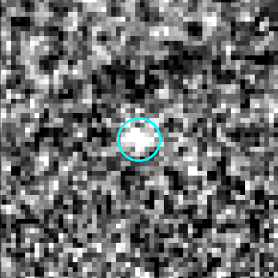
- QSO J0313-1806 imaged by the Visible and Infrared Survey Telescope for Astronomy.

Observation data (Epoch J2000.0)
- Constellation: Eridanus
- Right ascension: 03^{h} 13^{m} 43.84^{s}
- Declination: −18° 06′ 36.4″
- Redshift: 7.6423±0.0013
- Distance: 13 billion ly (4.0 billion pc) (light travel distance); 30 billion ly (9 billion pc) (proper distance)

Other designations
- QSO J031343.84−180636.4

QSO J0313−1806 was the most distant, and hence also the oldest known quasar at z = 7.64, at the time of its discovery. In January 2021, it was identified as the most redshifted (highest z) known quasar, with the oldest known supermassive black hole (SMBH) at (1.6±0.4)×10^{9} solar masses. The 2021 announcement paper described it as "the most massive SMBH at z > 7". This quasar beat the prior recordsetting quasar, ULAS J1342+0928. In 2023, UHZ1 was discovered, setting a new record for most distant quasar, eclipsing that of QSO J0313−1806.

One of the 2021 paper authors, Feige Wang, said that the existence of a supermassive black hole so early in the existence of the Universe posed problems for the current theories of formation since "black holes created by the very first massive stars could not have grown this large in only a few hundred million years". The redshift z = 7.642 corresponds to an age of about 600 million years.

== See also ==
- Direct collapse black hole, a process by which black holes may form less than a few hundred million years after the Big Bang
- List of the most distant astronomical objects
- List of quasars
- PSO J172.3556+18.7734
- ULAS J1342+0928

Records
Preceded by ULAS J1342+0928	Most distant known quasar 2021 – 2023	Succeeded by UHZ1
